= History of the Assyrians =

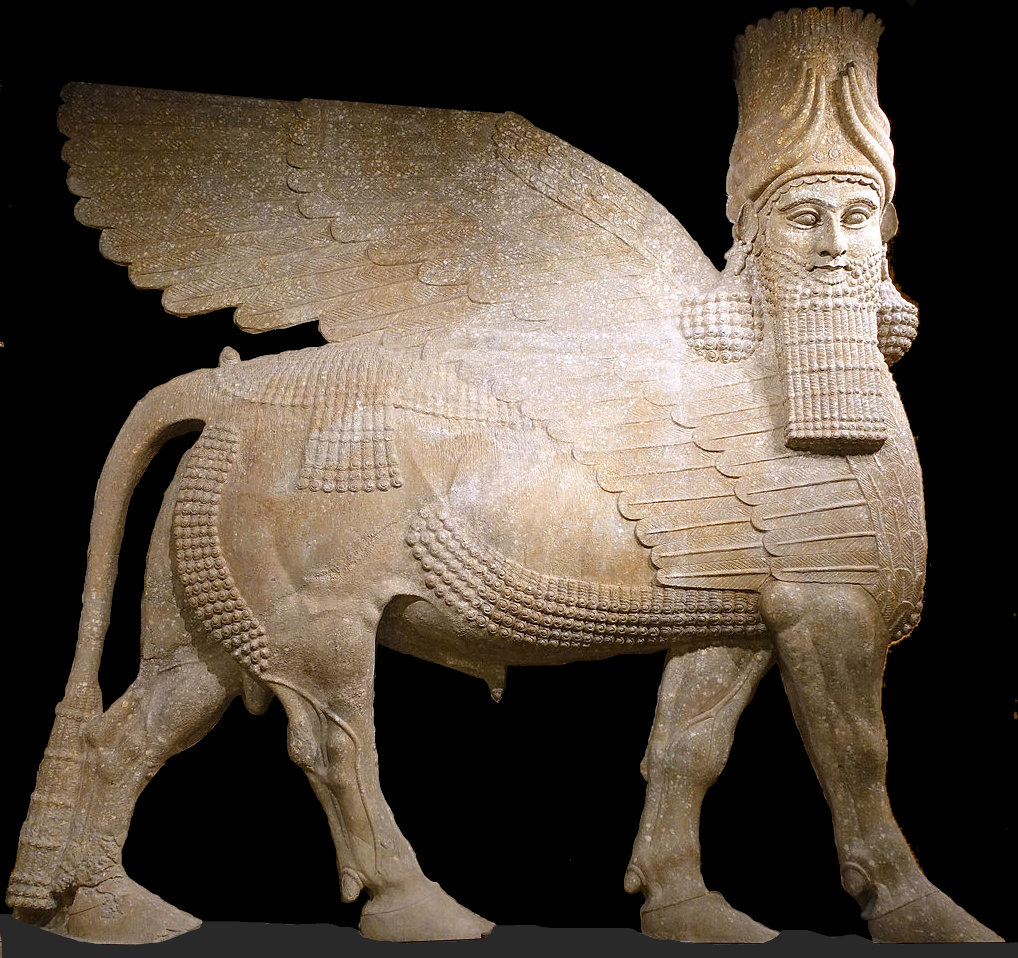
A giant lamassu from the royal palace of the Neo-Assyrian king Sargon II (r. 722–705 BC) at Dur-Sharrukin

The history of the Assyrians encompasses nearly five millennia, covering the history of the ancient Mesopotamian civilization of Assyria, including its territory, culture and people, as well as the later history of the Assyrian people after the fall of the Neo-Assyrian Empire in 609 BC. (Note: The modern Christian Assyrian people have historically appeared in western sources under many names, including the ethnic term Assyrians and its derivatives (Syriacs, East Syrians, the term Syria being etymologically derived from and originally meaning Assyrian) and the religiously denominational terms Nestorians, Chaldeans/Chaldean Catholics/Chaldo-Assyrians, Syriac Christians and Jacobites. In their own language, their historical self-designation has typically (but see also terms for Syriac Christians) been Assurayu, Asoraye, Sūrāyē or Sūrōyē. This self-designation is generally accepted by modern scholars to be derived from the ancient Akkadian Assūrāyu ("Assyrian"), which was sometimes later rendered in the shorter form Sūrāyu. This article follows the generally scholarly accepted idea of Assyrian continuity, that the modern Assyrians are descended from the ancient people of Assyria. Assyrian continuity is strongly supported by both historical archaeological, linguistic and genetic evidence.) For purposes of historiography, ancient Assyrian history is often divided by modern researchers, based on political events and gradual changes in language, into the Early Assyrian (c. 2600–2025 BC), Old Assyrian (c. 2025–1364 BC), Middle Assyrian (c. 1363–912 BC), Neo-Assyrian (911–609 BC) and post-imperial (609 BC–c. AD 240) periods, Sassanid era Asoristan from 240 AD until 637 AD and the post Islamic conquest period until the present day.

Assyria gets its name from the ancient city of Assur, founded c. 2600 BC. During much of its early history, Assur was dominated by foreign states and polities from southern Mesopotamia, for instance falling under the hegemony of the Sumerian city of Kish, being incorporated into the ethnically same Akkadian Empire and falling under the rule of the Third Dynasty of Ur. The city and its surrounds became an independent city-state under its own line of rulers during the collapse of the Third Dynasty of Ur, achieving independence under Puzur-Ashur I c. 2025 BC. Puzur-Ashur's dynasty continued to govern Assur which became a regional power with colonies in Anatolia and influence over South Mesopotamia until the throne was usurped by the Amorite conqueror Shamshi-Adad I c. 1808 BC. This period is sometimes known as the Old Assyrian Empire and latterly the 'Empire of Shamshi Adad'. After a few decades of Babylonian domination in the mid 18th century BC, Assyria was restored as an independent state, perhaps by the king Puzur-Sin or his successor Adasi, both of whom defeated the Babylonians and Amorites. In the 15th century BC, Assyria briefly fell under the suzerainty of the Mitanni kingdom. After wars between Mitanni and the Hittites, Assur broke free, and under Ashur-uballit I (r. c. 1363–1328 BC) destroyed the Hurri-Mitanni Empire and annexed much of the territory of the Hittite Empire and transitioned to a powerful territorial state governing an increasingly large stretch of territory in Mesopotamia, Anatolia and the Levant, forming the Middle Assyrian Empire.

Under the 14th and 13th-century BC warrior-kings Adad-nirari I, Shalmaneser I and Tukulti-Ninurta I, the Middle Assyrian Empire became one of the great powers of the ancient Near East, for a time even occupying Babylonia in the south. After the death of Ashur-bel-kala in 1056 BC, Assyria experienced a long period of decline, sometimes interrupted by energetic warrior-kings, which restricted Assyria to little more than the Assyrian heartland and surrounding territories, though Assyrian military prowess remained the best in the world. New efforts by the Assyrian kings of the 10th and 9th centuries BC reversed this decline and saw a renewed period of expansion. Under Ashurnasirpal II in the early 9th century BC, Assyria (now the Neo-Assyrian Empire) once more became the dominant political and military power of the Near East. Assyrian expansionism and power reached its peak under Tiglath-Pileser III in the 8th century BC and the subsequent Sargonid dynasty of kings, under whom the Neo-Assyrian Empire stretched from Egypt, Libya and Arabian Peninsula the south to the Caucasus in the north, and Persia in the east to Cyprus in the west. Babylonia was recaptured and Assyrian campaigns were conducted into both Anatolia and modern-day Armenia. The empire, and Assyria as a state, came to an end in the late 7th century BC as a result of the Medo-Babylonian conquest of the Assyrian Empire after a draining civil war among rival claimants to the Assyrian throne had gravely weakened it.

After the fall of the Neo-Assyrian Empire, the Assyrian people continued to survive northern Mesopotamia and southeastern Anatolia and Assyrian cultural traditions were kept alive. Though the Babylonians and Medes had extensively devastated Assyrian cities, the region was soon significantly rebuilt and revived under the rule of the Achaemenid, Seleucid and Parthian empires, from the 4th century BC to the 3rd century AD. Assur itself flourished in the late post-imperial period, perhaps once more under its own line of rulers as a semi-autonomous city-state. During the Parthian Empire a number of Neo Assyrian states emerged from the 2nd century BC to mid 3rd century AD, including Assur, Adiabene, Osroene, Beth Nuhadra, Beth Garmai and the partly Assyrian Hatra. However these states were conquered by the Sasanian Empire c. AD 240. Starting from the 1st century AD onwards, the Assyrians were Christianized, though holdouts of the old ancient Mesopotamian religion continued to survive for many centuries, into the Late Middle Ages in some regions. The Assyrians continued to constitute a significant if not majority portion of the population in northern Mesopotamia, Northeast Syria and Southeast Anatolia until suppression and massacres under the Ilkhanate and the Timurid Empire in the 14th century. These atrocities relegated the Assyrians to a local indigenous ethnic, linguistic and religious minority. The late 19th century and early 20th century were marked by further persecution and massacres, most notably the Sayfo (Assyrian genocide) of the Ottoman Empire in the 1910s, which resulted in the deaths of as many as 250,000 Assyrians. (Note: The precise number is far from certain since the massacres were poorly documented by the Ottoman government. The Assyrian population prior to the genocide amounted to about 500,000–600,000 people and the generally accepted estimate is that about 50 % of the Assyrian people were killed.) This time of atrocities was also marked by an increasing Assyrian cultural consciousness; the first Assyrian newspaper, Zahrirē d-Bahra ("Rays of Light"), began publishing in 1848 and the earliest Assyrian political party, the Assyrian Socialist Party, was founded in 1917. Throughout the 20th century and still today, many unsuccessful proposals have been made by the Assyrians for autonomy or independence. Further massacres and persecutions, enacted both by governments and by terrorist groups such as the Islamic State have resulted in most of the Assyrian people living in diaspora.

== Ancient Assyria (2600 BC–AD 240) ==
=== Early Assyrian period (2600–2025 BC) ===
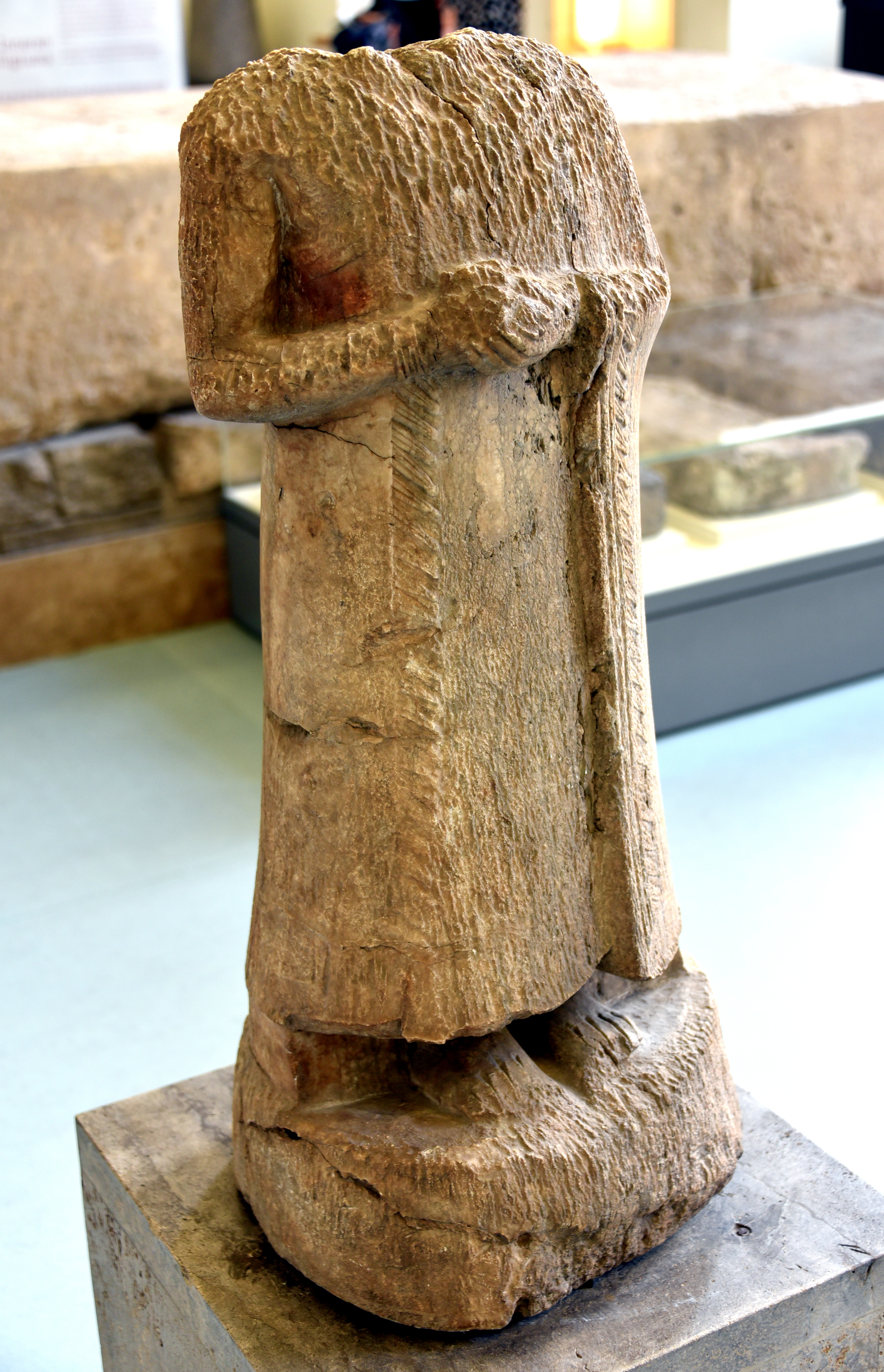
Statue of a ruler from Assur during the time of the Third Dynasty of Ur, possibly the local governor Zariqum

Agricultural villages in the region that would later become Assyria are known to have existed by the time of the Hassuna culture, c. 6300–5800 BC. Though the sites of some nearby cities that would later be incorporated into the Assyrian heartland, such as Nineveh, are known to have been inhabited since the Neolithic, the earliest archaeological evidence from Assur dates to the Early Dynastic Period, c. 2600 BC, a time in which the surrounding region was already relatively urbanized. It is possible that the city was founded earlier; much of the early historical remains of Assur may have been destroyed during the extensive construction projects of later Assyrian kings, who worked to create level foundations for the buildings they erected in the city. There is no evidence that early Assur was an independent settlement, and it might not have been called Assur at all initially, but rather Baltil or Baltila, used in later times to refer to the city's oldest portion. The name "Assur" is first attested for the site in documents of the Akkadian period in the 24th century BC.

Early Assur was probably a local religious and tribal center and must have been a town of some size since it had monumental temples. It was located in a highly strategic location, on a hill overlooking the Tigris river, protected by a river on one side and a canal on another. Surviving archaeological and literary evidence has been suggested by some historians that Assur in its earliest history may have been inhabited by Hurrians as well as Semitic ancestors of the Assyrians, although others reject this hypothesis. Assur was the site of a fertility cult devoted to the Assyrian-Akkadian goddess Ishtar. The earliest known archaeological finds at the site are Early Dynastic-age temples dedicated to Ishtar. These temples and the artifacts within them also show considerable similarities to temples and artifacts from Sumer in southern Mesopotamia, which might suggest that there was also a group of Sumerians living in the city, that it at some point was conquered by an unknown Sumerian ruler or simply be an example of the melding of Sumerian and Akkadian speaking culture in Mesopotamia. The East Semitic-speaking ancestors of the later Assyrians settled in Mesopotamia at some point during the 35th and 31st century BC, either assimilating or displacing the previous population. The earliest Assyrian king named Tudia appears to have lived in the mid 25th century BC.

During much of the early Assyrian period, Assur was dominated by states and polities from southern Mesopotamia. Early on, Assur for a time fell under the loose hegemony of the Sumerian city of Kish and it was later occupied by both the Akkadian Empire and then the Third Dynasty of Ur. The Akkadian Empire probably conquered Assur in the time of its first ruler, Sargon (c. 2334–2279 BC), and is known to have controlled the city at least from the reign of Manishtushu (c. 2270–2255 BC) onwards since contemporary inscriptions dedicated to Manishtushu have been recovered from the city. The earliest historically attested rulers (Note: The later Assyrian King List lists upwards of thirty names in this period but the majority are not attested elsewhere and thus not historically verified. The earliest kings in the list are described as "kings who lived in tents", i.e. probably semi nomadic Assyrian rulers, which fits poorly with the archaeological evidence of Assur and surrounding sites being urbanized from an early point in time.) of Assur were local governors under the Akkadian kings, including figures such as Ititi and Azazu, who bore the title Išši'ak Aššur (governor of Assur). Assur was strongly influenced both culturally and linguistically by the period under Akkadian rule (the Akkadians and Assyrians being ethno-linguistically the same people) and the period would be regarded as a golden age by later Assyrian kings, who often sought to emulate the Akkadian rulers who they viewed as their ancestors.

Assur was largely destroyed in the late Akkadian period, possibly by the Lullubi, but was rebuilt and later conquered by the Sumerian Third Dynasty of Ur in the late 22nd or early 21st century BC. Under the rulers of Ur, Assur became a peripheral city state under its own governors, such as Zariqum, who paid tribute to the southern kings. This period of Sumerian dominance over the city came to an end as the last king of the Third Dynasty of Ur, Ibbi-Sin (c. 2028–2004 BC) lost his administrative grip on the peripheral regions of his empire and Assur became an independent city-state controlling areas of northern Mesopotamia under its own rulers, beginning with Puzur-Ashur I c. 2025 BC, although it appears kings such as Ushpia c. 2080 BC were also independent.

=== Old Assyrian period (2025–1364 BC) ===
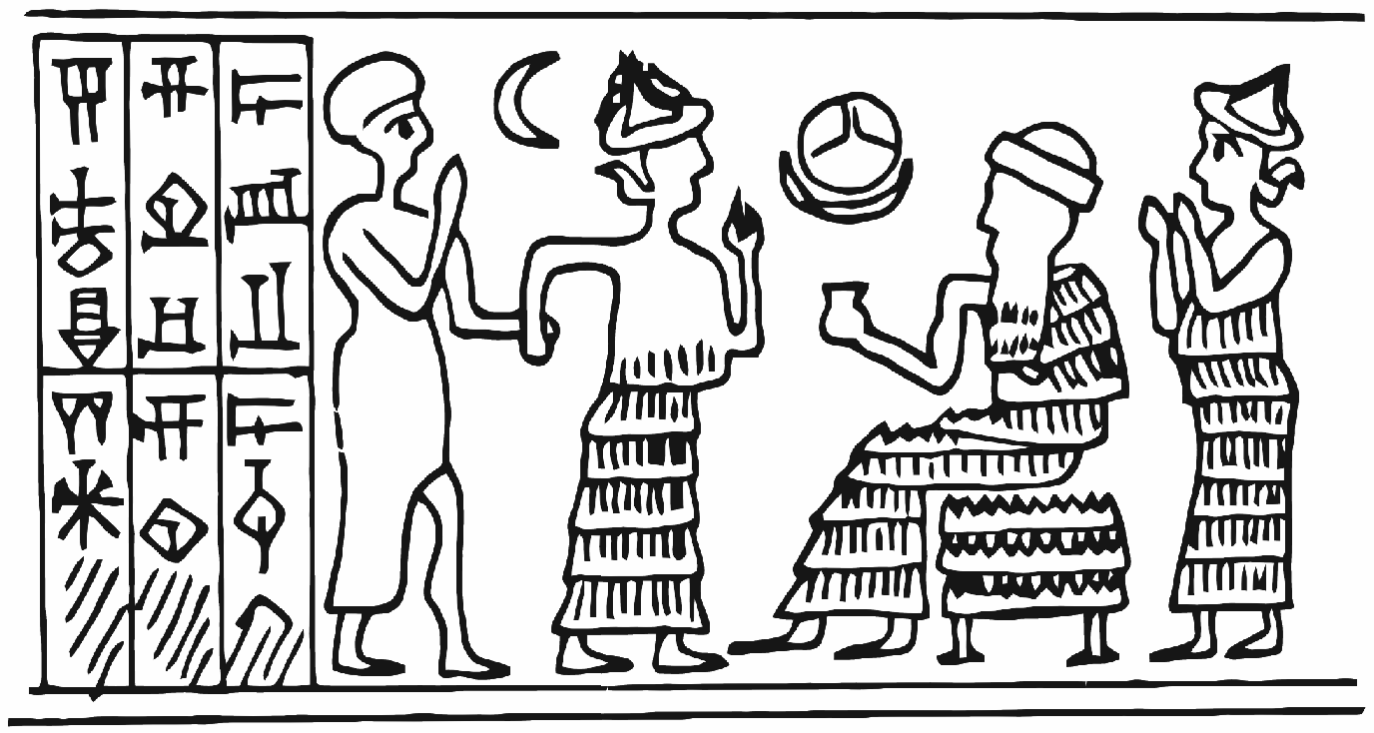
Royal seal of Erishum I (r. c. 1974–1934 BC)

Puzur-Ashur I and the succeeding kings of his dynasty, the Puzur-Ashur dynasty, did not technically claim the dignity of "king" (šar) for themselves, but continued to use the style rulers of Assur had used while the city was under foreign rule, Išši'ak ("governor"). The use of this style asserted that the actual king of the city was the Assyrian national deity Ashur and that the Assyrian ruler was merely his representative on Earth. It is probable that Ashur took form as a deity at some point during the Early Assyrian period as a personification of the city of Assur itself. During the rule of the Puzur-Ashur dynasty, Assur was home to less than 10,000 people and the military power of the city is likely to have been limited to local regions; no sources describe any military conquests whatsoever and no surrounding cities appear to have been subjected to the rule of the Assyrian kings. The earliest known surviving inscription by an Assyrian king was written by Puzur-Ashur I's son and successor Shalim-ahum, and records the king having built a temple dedicated to Ashur "for his own life and the life of his city". The fourth king of the dynasty, Erishum I (r. c. 1974–1934 BC), is the earliest king whose length of reign is recorded in the Assyrian King List, a later document recording the kings of Assyria and their reigns. Erishum is noteworthy for being the earliest known ruler in world history to experiment with free trade, leaving the initiative for trade and large-scale foreign transactions entirely to his populace. Though large institutions, such as the temples and the king himself, did take part in trade, the financing itself was provided by private bankers, who in turn bore nearly all the risk (but also earned nearly all the profits) of the trading ventures. The king earned a portion of the profit through imposing tolls and the money gained was used to expand Assur and its institutions. Through Erishum's efforts, Assur quickly established itself as a prominent trading state in northern Mesopotamia and Anatolia.

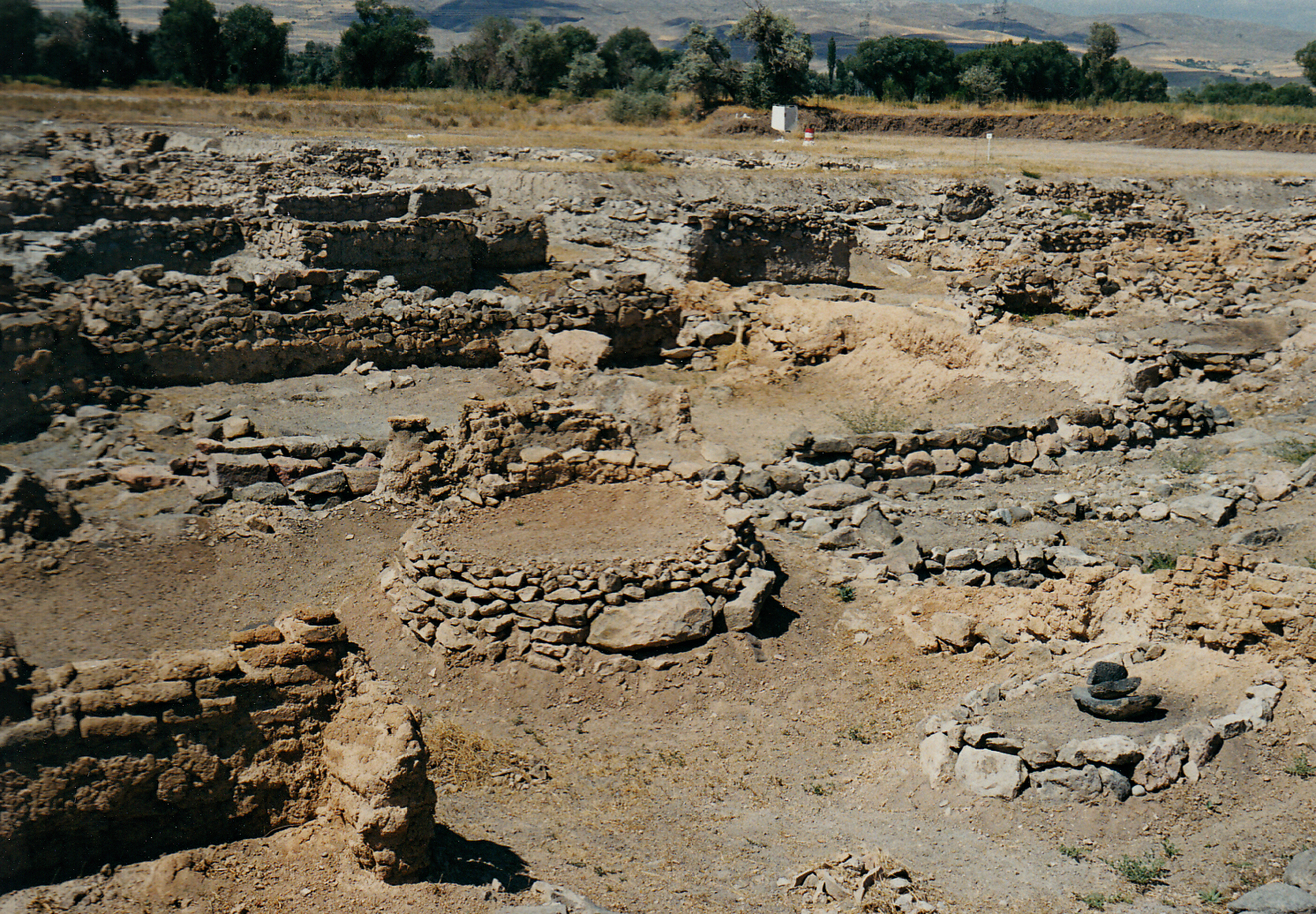
Ruins of the Old Assyrian trading colony at Kültepe

It is clear that an extensive long-distance Assyrian trade network was established relatively quickly, the first notable impression Assyria left in the historical record. Notable collections of Old Assyrian cuneiform tablets have been found in trading colonies established by the Assyrians in their trade network. The most notable locality excavated is Kültepe, near the modern city of Kayseri in Turkey. At this time, Kültepe was also a city-state ruled by its own line of kings. Over 22,000 Assyrian cuneiform clay tablets have been found at the site. In some way, Assur was able to maintain its central position in its trade network despite being small and having no known history of military activity, though it may be that military activity did in fact play a part. Assur's importance as a trading center declined in the 19th century BC, perhaps chiefly because of increasing conflict between states and rulers of the ancient Near East leading to a general decrease in trade. From this time to the end of the Old Assyrian period, Assur frequently fell into conflict with larger foreign states and empires. In particular, the nearby centers of Eshnunna and Ekallatum threatened the continued existence of the Assur city-state. However Assyrian records during the reigns of Ilu-shuma, Erishum I and Sargon I show signs of intervention in southern Mesopotamia, which was under pressure from Elamites to the east and Amorites to the west. It is unclear whether this was military intervention in support of their fellow Akkadian speakers, favourable trading terms or both. The original city-state came to an end c. 1808 BC when it was conquered by the Amorite ruler of Ekallatum, Shamshi-Adad I, who deposed Erishum II, the last king of the Puzur-Ashur dynasty after having been repelled by his predecessor, and took the city for himself.

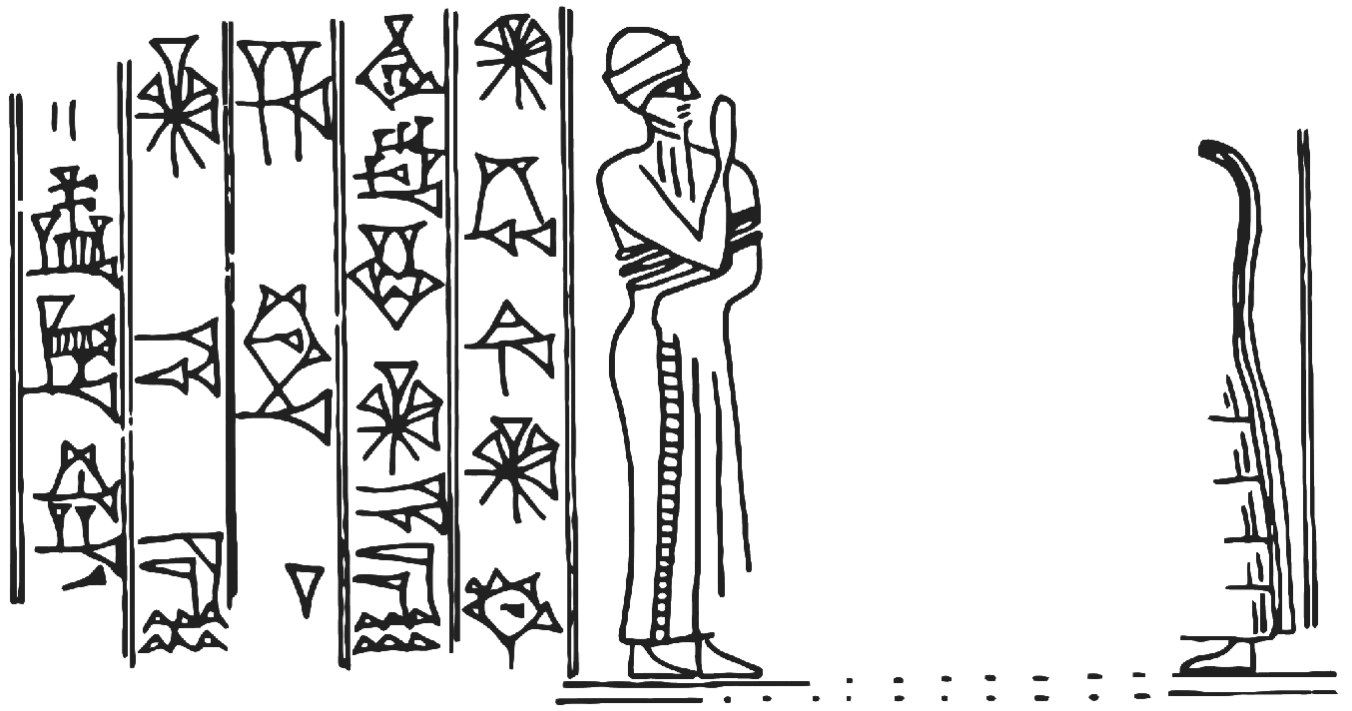
Incomplete royal seal of the Amorite conqueror Shamshi-Adad I (r. c. 1808–1776 BC)

Shamshi-Adad's extensive conquests in northern Mesopotamia eventually made him the ruler of the entire region, founding what some scholars have termed the "Kingdom of Upper Mesopotamia". To rule his realm, Shamshi-Adad established his capital at the city of Shubat-Enlil. Around 1785 BC, Shamshi-Adad placed his two sons in control of different parts of the kingdom, the elder son Yasmah-Adad being granted Mari and the younger son Ishme-Dagan I being granted Ekallatum and Assur. Though the locals in Assur considered Shamshi-Adad and his family to be foreign conquerors, Shamshi-Adad did have certain respect for Assur and sometimes stayed in the city and partook in its religious ceremonies. Shamshi-Adad also oversaw the renovation of the city, the rebuilding of the temple of Ashur and the addition of a sanctuary dedicated to the head of the Mesopotamian pantheon, Enlil. It is possible that Shamshi-Adad promoted a theology that equated Ashur and Enlil as one and the same. In that case, his theology was hugely influential as Assyrians in later times attributed the role of "king of the gods" to Ashur, a role otherwise typically attributed to Enlil. In the 18th century BC, Shamshi-Adad's kingdom became surrounded by competing large states, particularly the southern kingdoms of Larsa, Babylon and Eshnunna and the western kingdoms of Yamhad and Qatna. The success and survival of his own realm chiefly relied on his personal strength and charisma. Shamshi-Adad's death in c. 1776 BC led to the collapse of the kingdom. His principal successor, Ishme-Dagan I, ruled from Ekallatum and retained control only of that city and of Assur.

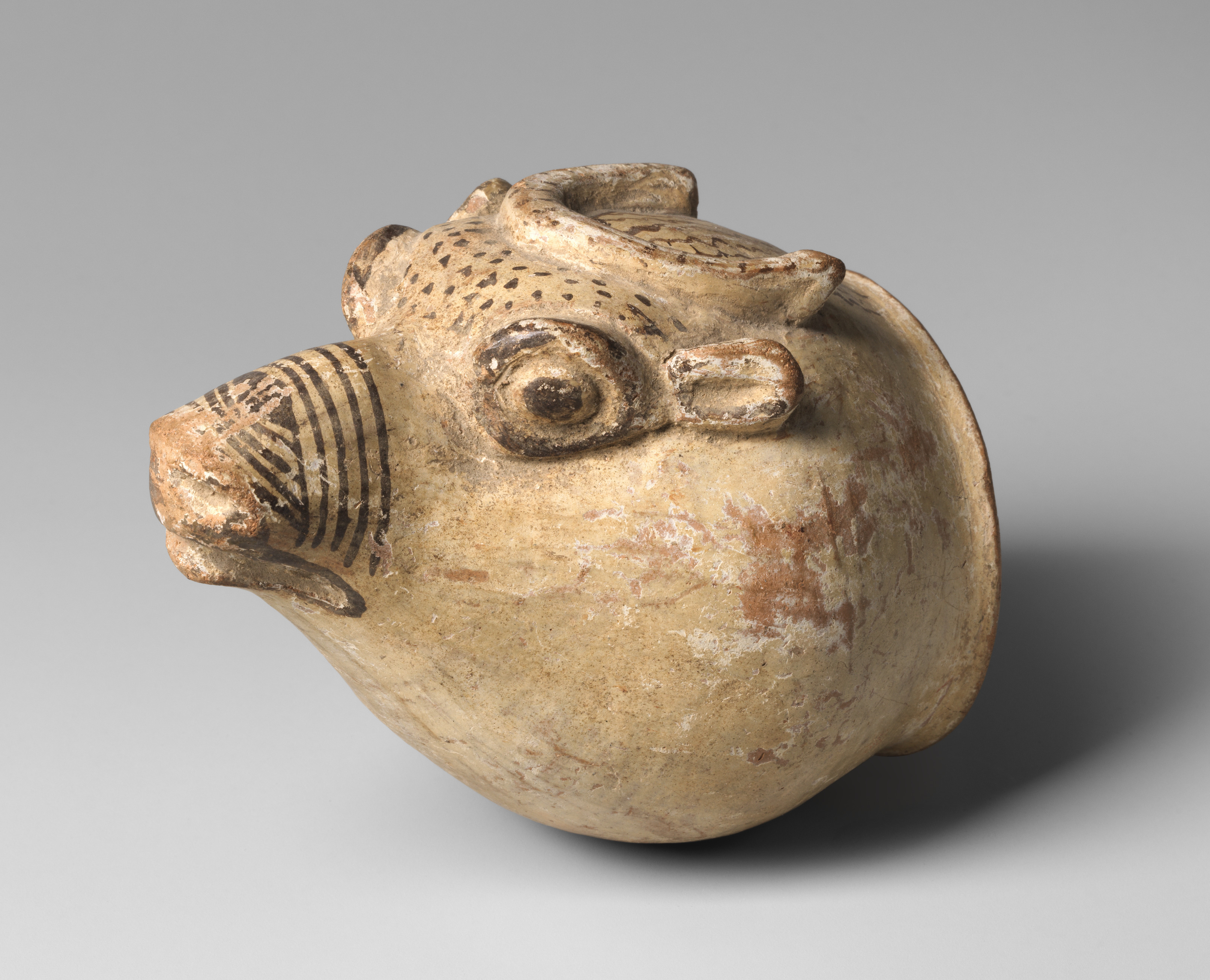
Old Assyrian drinking vessel from Kültepe, in the shape of a ram's head

The time between the collapse of Shamshi-Adad's kingdom in the 18th century BC and the rise of the Middle Assyrian Empire in the 14th century BC is often regarded by modern scholars as an Assyrian "Dark Age" due to the lack of sufficient historical evidence to clearly establish events during this time. It is clear from surviving records that the geopolitical situation in northern Mesopotamia was highly volatile, with frequent shifts in power. In c. 1772 BC Ibal-pi-el II of Eshnunna invaded and conquered Ishme-Dagan's kingdom, though he returned to power not long thereafter. A few years later, an army from Elam invaded northern Mesopotamia and seized a few cities. In c. 1761 BC, Assur, perhaps only briefly, fell under the control of the Old Babylonian Empire under Hammurabi. At some point, Assur returned to being an independent city-state. There was during this time also significant infighting within the government of Assur itself, as members of Shamshi-Adad's dynasty fought with native Assyrians and Hurrians for control of the city. Eventually, the Shamshi-Adad dynasty's rule over Assur came to an end through the Assyrian usurper Puzur-Sin re-establishing native rule. The defeat of the Babylonians and Amorites did not mean an end to the troubles, as there was a time of non-dynastic kings and further infighting before the rise of Bel-bani c. 1700 BC. Bel-bani founded the Adaside dynasty, which after his reign ruled Assyria for about a thousand years.

In large parts, the invasion or raid of southern Mesopotamia by the Hittite king Mursili I in c. 1595 BC was critical to Assyria's later development. This invasion destroyed the then dominant power in southern Mesopotamia, the Old Babylonian Empire, which created a vacuum of power that led to the formation of the Kassite kingdom of Babylonia in the south and the Hurrian Mitanni state to the north of Assyria. Assyrian rulers from c. 1520 to c. 1430 were more politically assertive than their predecessors, both regionally and internationally. Puzur-Ashur III (r. c. 1521–1498 BC) is the earliest Assyrian king to appear in the Synchronistic History, a later text concerning border disputes between Assyria and Babylonia, suggesting that Assyria first entered into diplomacy and conflict with Babylonia at this time and that Assur at this time ruled a small stretch of territory beyond the city itself. Around c. 1430 BC, Assur was subjugated by Mitanni and forced to become a vassal, an arrangement that lasted for about 70 years, until c. 1360 BC. Assur retained some autonomy under the Mitanni kings, as Assyrian kings during this time are attested as commissioning building projects, trading with Egypt and signing boundary agreements with the Kassites in Babylon. Another Hittite invasion, by Šuppiluliuma I in the early 14th century BC, effectively crippled the Mitanni kingdom. After his invasion, Assyria succeeded in freeing itself from its suzerain, achieving independence once more in the early 14th century BC, and under Ashur-uballit I (r. c. 1363–1328 BC), whose rise to power and conquests at the expense of the Mitanni and Babylonians traditionally marks the transition between the Old and Middle Assyrian periods.

=== Middle Assyrian period (1363–912 BC) ===
==== Rise of Assyria ====
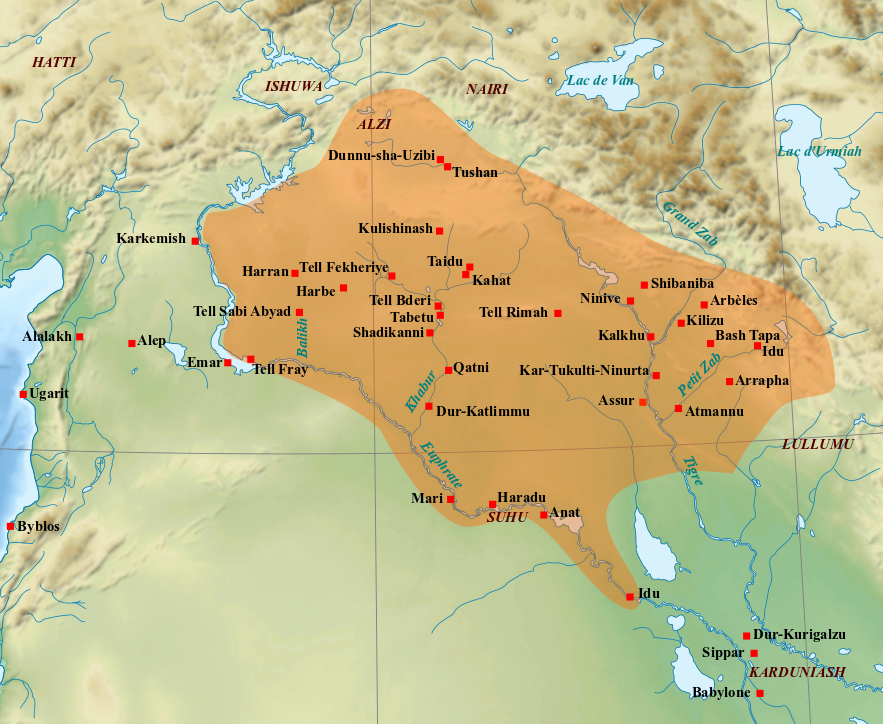
Approximate map of the Middle Assyrian Empire at its height in the 13th century BC

Ashur-uballit I was the first native Assyrian ruler to claim the royal title šar ("king"). Shortly after achieving independence, he further claimed the dignity of a great king on the level of the Egyptian pharaohs and the Hittite kings. Ashur-uballit's claim to be a great king meant that he also embedded himself in the ideological implications of that role; a great king was expected to expand the borders of his realm to incorporate "uncivilized" territories, ideally eventually ruling the entire world. Ashur-uballit's reign was often regarded by later generations of Assyrians as the true birth of Assyria. The term "land of Ashur" (māt Aššur), i.e. designating Assyria as comprising a larger kingdom, is first attested as being used in his time. Assyria's rise was intertwined with the decline and fall of the Mitanni kingdom, its former suzerain, which allowed the early Middle Assyrian kings to expand and consolidate territories in northern Mesopotamia. Ashur-uballit mainly warred against small states in the southern vicinity of the Assyrian heartland. He engaged in diplomacy with both Babylonia, ruled by Burnaburiash II, and Egypt, ruled by Akhenaten. Ashur-uballit's successors Enlil-nirari (r. c. 1327–1318 BC) and Arik-den-ili (r. c. 1317–1306 BC) were less successful than Ashur-uballit in expanding and consolidating Assyrian power, and as such the new empire developed somewhat haltingly and remained fragile. Enlil-nirari's reign was the beginning of the historical enmity between Assyria and Babylonia after Kurigalzu II, a king the Assyrians had helped gain the Babylonian throne, attacked Assyria. Kurigalzu's betrayal resulted in deep trauma and was still referenced in Assyrian writings concerning Babylonia more than a century later.

Under the warrior-kings Adad-nirari I (r. c. 1305–1274 BC), Shalmaneser I (r. c. 1273–1244 BC) and Tukulti-Ninurta I (r. c. 1243–1207 BC), Assyria began to realize its aspirations of becoming a significant regional power. Adad-nirari was the first Assyrian king to march against the remnants of the Mitanni kingdom and the first Assyrian king to include lengthy narratives of his campaigns in his royal inscriptions. Adad-nirari early in his reign defeated Shattuara I of Mitanni and forced him to pay tribute to Assyria as a vassal ruler. After a revolt by Shattuara's son Wasashatta Adad-niari annexed some Mitanni lands and constructed a royal palace for himself at Taite, a former Mitanni capital. Adad-nirari also fought with Babylonia, defeating the Babylonian king Nazi-Maruttash at the Battle of Kār Ištar c. 1280 BC and redrawing the border between the two kingdoms in Assyria's favor.

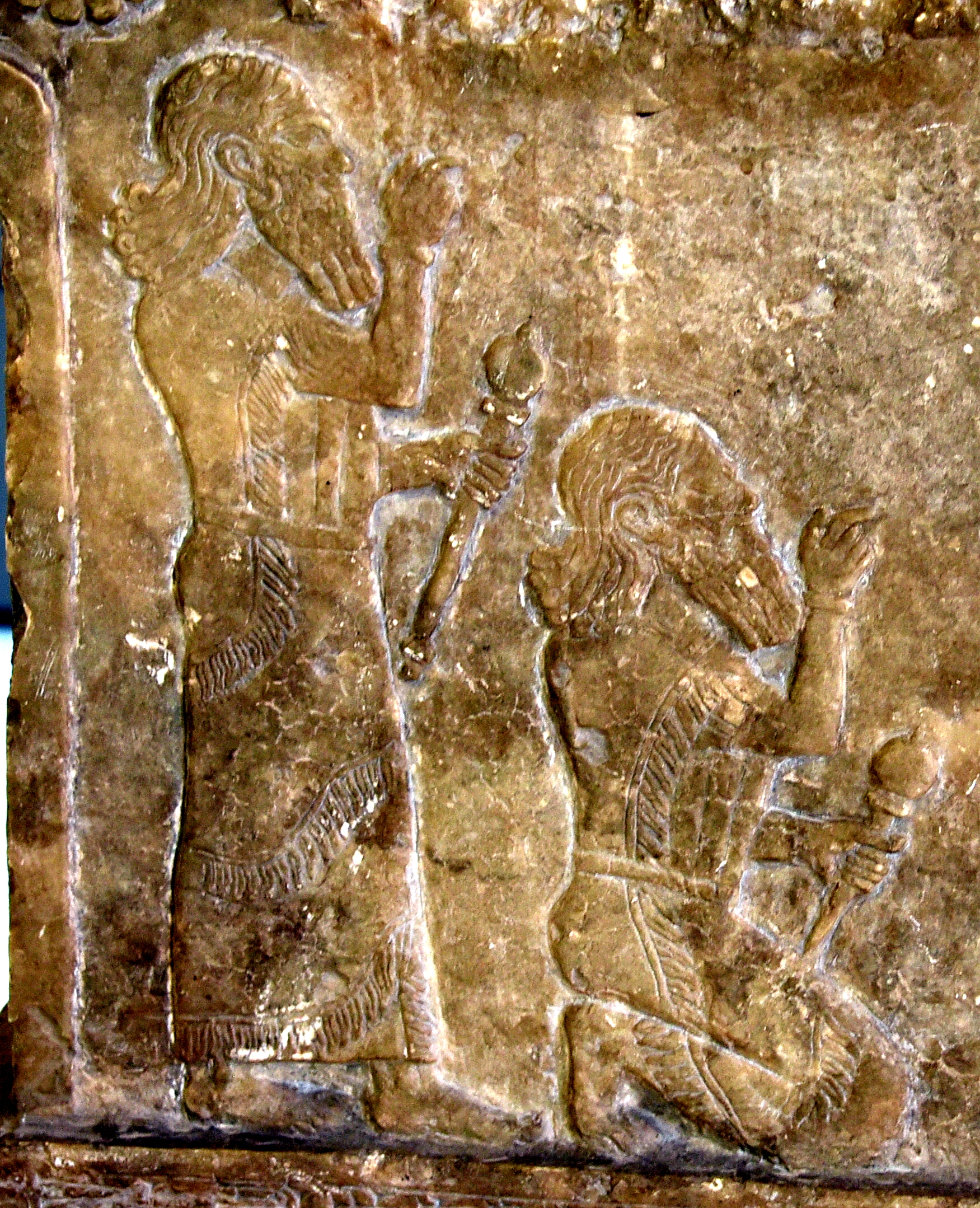
Tukulti-Ninurta I (r. c. 1243–1207 BC), depicted both standing and kneeling (Note: The absence of a royal crown in this image is due to the king being depicted in a religious/cultic context.)

Assyrian campaigns and conquests intensified under Shalmaneser I. Shalmaneser's most significant wars were those directed towards the west and north. After the Mitanni king Shattuara II rebelled against Assyrian authority, Shalmaneser campaigned against him to suppress the resistance. As a result of Shalmaneser's victory in the campaign, the Mitanni capital of Washukanni was sacked and the Mitanni lands were formally annexed into the Assyrian Empire. Shalmaneser's reign also saw worsening relations with the Hittites, who had supported Shattuara II's revolt. Shalmaneser warred several times against Hittite vassals in the Levant. Conflict with the Hittites continued in the reign of Shalmaneser's son Tukulti-Ninurta I until the Assyrian victory at the Battle of Nihriya c. 1237 BC, which marked the beginning of the end of Hittite influence in northern Mesopotamia and the annexation of formerly Hittite territories in the Levant and Anatolia. In addition to his various campaigns and conquests, which brought the Middle Assyrian Empire to its greatest extent, Tukulti-Ninurta is also famous for being the first Assyrian king to transfer the capital of Assyria away from Assur itself. In his eleventh year as king (c. 1233 BC), Tukulti-Ninurta inaugurated the new capital city Kar-Tukulti-Ninurta, named after himself (the name meaning "fortress of Tukulti-Ninurta"). The city only served as the capital during Tukulti-Ninurta's reign, with later kings returning to ruling from Assur.

Tukulti-Ninurta's main goal was Babylonia in the south; he intentionally escalated conflict with the Babylonian king Kashtiliash IV through claiming "traditionally Assyrian" lands along the eastern Tigris river. Shortly thereafter, he invaded Babylonia in an unprovoked attack. After capturing cities such as Sippar and Dur-Kurigalzu and defeating Kashtiliash in battle, Tukulti-Ninurta eventually succeeded in conquering Babylonia c. 1225 BC. He was the first Assyrian king to assume the traditionally southern Mesopotamian title "king of Sumer and Akkad" and the first native Mesopotamian to be crowned king of Babylon, its previous rulers having all been Amorites and Kassites. Assyrian control over Babylonia was quite indirect, ruling through appointing vassal kings such as Adad-shuma-iddina. After putting down a Babylonian uprising, Tukulti-Ninurta added to his title the style šamšu kiššat niše ("sun[god] of all people"), a highly unusual style since the Assyrian king was typically regarded to be the representative of a god and not divine himself. Eventually Babylonia fell out of Tukulti-Ninurta's grasp. An uprising led by Adad-shuma-usur, perhaps a son of Kashtiliash IV, (Note: Adad-shuma-usur is designated as Kashtiliash's son in later Babylonian texts. He himself claimed to be the son of Kashtiliash only in a handful of inscriptions; it is possible that he only claimed to be Kashtiliash's son to further his claim to the Babylonian throne. Records from Elam, though they were written centuries later, designate Adad-shuma-usur as an unrelated usurper, son of a man named Dunna-Sah from the "middle Euphrates river" region.) drove the Assyrians out of Babylonia c. 1216 BC. The loss of Babylonia increased growing dissatisfaction with Tukulti-Ninurta's rule. His long and prosperous reign ended with his assassination, which in turn was followed by inter-dynastic conflict and a significant drop in Assyrian power.

==== Troubles and decline ====
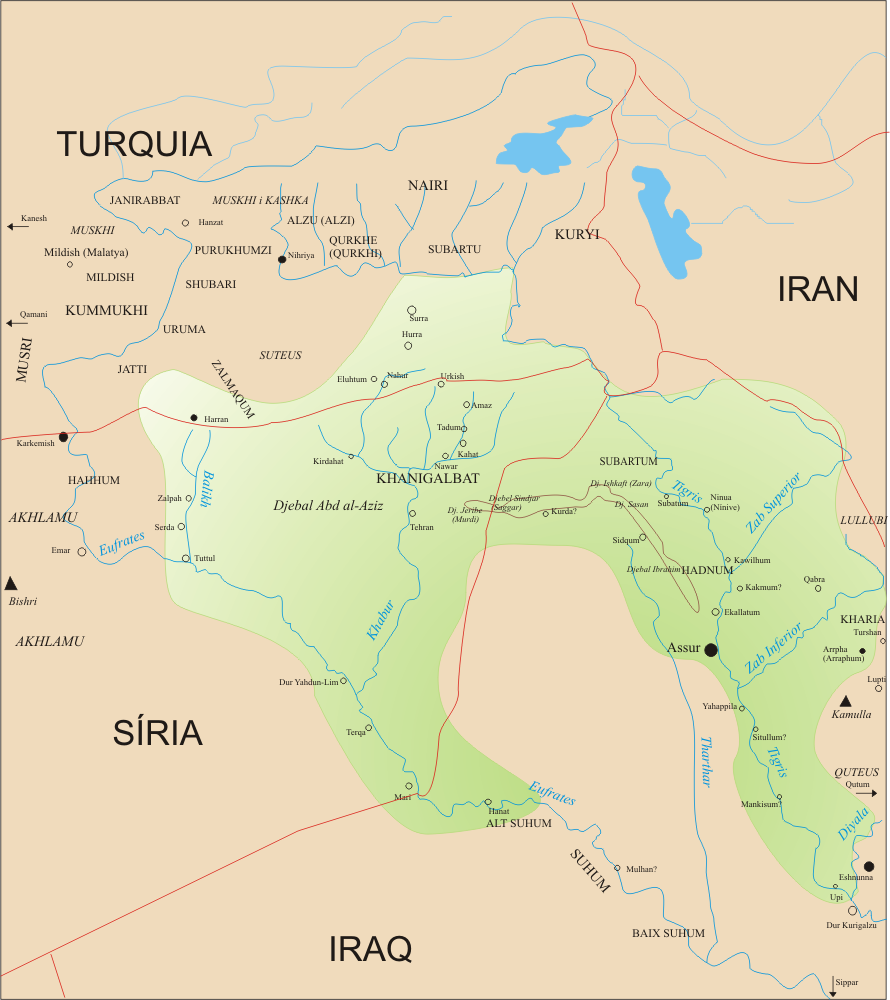
Map of the Middle Assyrian Empire under Ashur-resh-ishi I (r. 1132–1115 BC)

The successors of Tukulti-Ninurta were unable to maintain Assyrian power and the empire became increasingly restricted to just the Assyrian heartland. The decline of the Middle Assyrian Empire broadly coincided with the latter period of the Late Bronze Age collapse, a time when the ancient Near East, North Africa, Caucasus and Southeast Europe experienced monumental geopolitical changes; within a single generation, the Hittite Empire and the Kassite dynasty of Babylon had fallen, and Egypt had been severely weakened through losing its lands in the Levant. Modern researchers tend to varyingly ascribe the Bronze Age collapse to large-scale migrations, invasions by the mysterious Sea Peoples, new warfare technology and its effects, starvation, epidemics, climate change and an unsustainable exploitation of the working population. Tukulti-Ninurta's direct dynastic line came to an end c. 1192 BC, when the grand vizier Ninurta-apal-Ekur, a descendant of Adad-nirari I, took the throne for himself. Ninurta-apal-Ekur and his immediate successors were no more able than Tukulti-Ninurta's descendants to halt the decline of the empire.

Ninurta-apal-Ekur's son Ashur-dan I (r. c. 1178–1133 BC), improved the situation somewhat, campaigning against the Babylonian king Zababa-shuma-iddin, but his two sons Ninurta-tukulti-Ashur and Mutakkil-Nusku struggled for power with each other after his death. Though Mutakkil-Nusku emerged victorious, he ruled for less than a year. Mutakkil-Nusku warred against the Babylonian king Itti-Marduk-balatu, a conflict which continued in the reign of his son Ashur-resh-ishi I (r. 1132–1115 BC). In the Synchronistic History (a later Assyrian document), Ashur-resh-ishi is cast as a savior of the Assyrian Empire, defeating the Babylonian king Nebuchadnezzar I in several battles. In some of his inscriptions, Ashur-resh-ishi claimed the epithet "avenger of Assyria" (mutēr gimilli māt Aššur).

Due to Ashur-resh-ishi's victories over Babylonia, his son Tiglath-Pileser I (r. 1114–1076 BC) could focus his attention on other territories without worrying about southern attacks. Texts written already during his first few regnal years demonstrate that Tiglath-Pileser ruled with more confidence than his immediate predecessors, using titles such as "unrivalled king of the universe, king of the four quarters, king of all princes, lord of lords" and epithets such as "splendid flame which covers the hostile land like a rain storm". Tiglath-Pileser went on significant campaigns to the west and north, incorporating both territories lost after Tukulti-Ninurta's reign and territories that had never before been under Assyrian rule. Tiglath-Pileser's inscriptions are the first Assyrian inscriptions to describe punitive measures against rebelling cities and regions in any detail. He also increased the size of the Assyrian cavalry and introducing war chariots on a grander scale than previous kings. Though one of the most successful Middle Assyrian kings, Some of Tiglath-Pileser's conquests were not long-lasting and several territories, especially in the west, were likely lost again before or just after his death. Assyria became overstretched and Tiglath-Pileser's successors were forced to adapt to be on the defensive. An increasing problem from the late reign of Ashur-bel-kala onwards were the Aramean tribes in the west. Due to the Aramean tactics of avoiding open battle and instead attacking the Assyrians in numerous minor skirmishes, the Assyrian army could in conflict with them not take advantage of their combat, technical and numerical superiority.

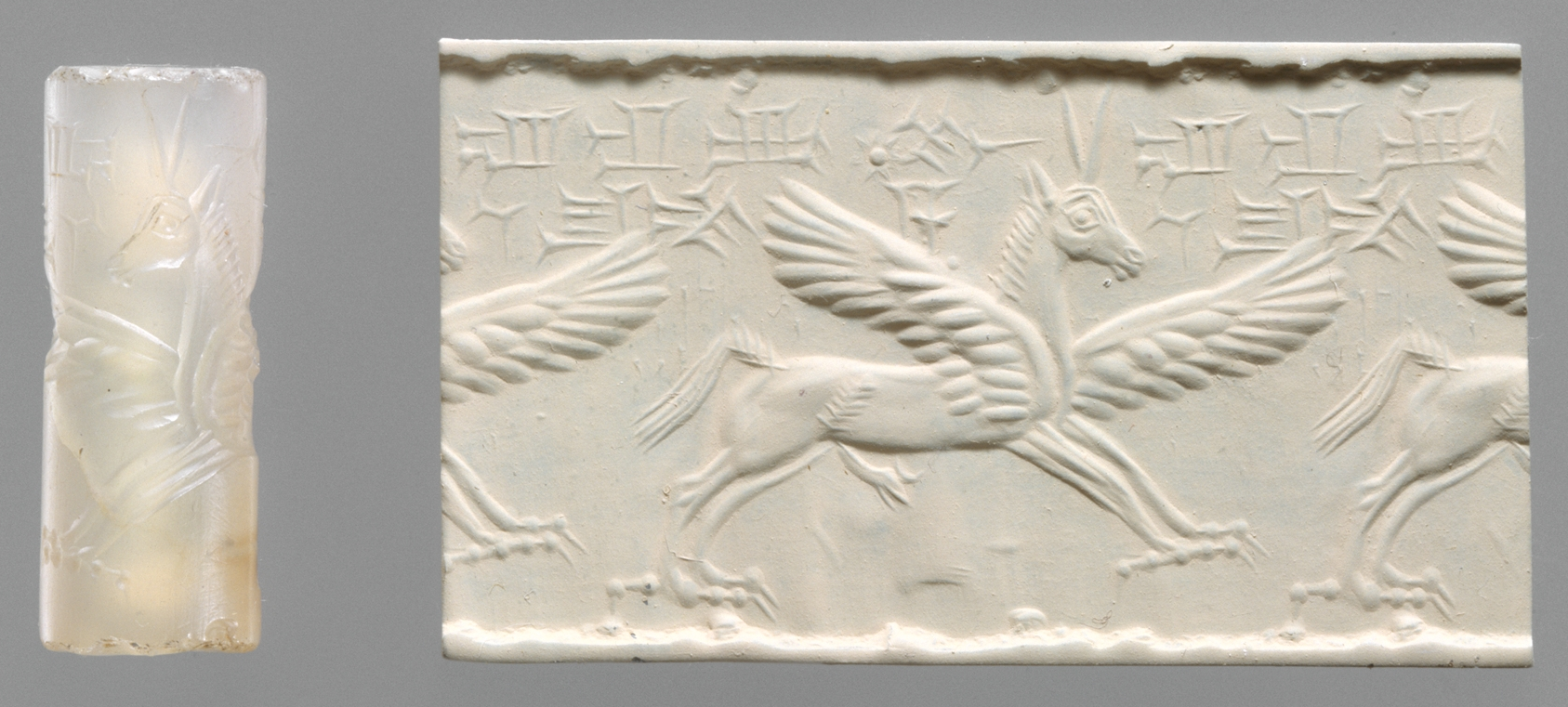
Middle Assyrian cylinder seal, and modern impression, depicting a winged horse

From the time of Eriba-Adad II (r. 1056–1054 BC) onwards, the kings were unable to maintain the achievements of their predecessors. This period of renewed decline was not reversed until the middle of the 10th century BC. Though this period is poorly documented, (Note: Though less in number than in preceding and succeeding times, a number of royal inscriptions are known from this period of Middle Assyrian decline, particularly from the reign of Ashurnasirpal I (r. 1049–1031 BC).) it is clear that Assyria underwent a major crisis. The Arameans continued to be Assyria's most prominent enemies, at times raiding deep into the Assyrian heartland. Their attacks were uncoordinated raids carried out by individual groups, which meant that even though the Assyrians defeated several Aramean groups in battle, their guerrilla tactics and ability to withdraw into difficult terrain quickly prevented the Assyrians from ever achieving a lasting victory. Though control was lost over most of the Middle Assyrian Empire, the Assyrian heartland remained safe and intact, protected by its geographical remoteness and the military capabilities of its army. Assyria was not the only realm fragmented during this period, which meant that the fragmented territories now surrounding the Assyrian heartland in time proved to be easy conquests for the Assyrian army. Ashur-dan II (r. 934–912 BC) reversed Assyrian decline, campaigning in the peripheries of the Assyrian heartland, primarily in the northeast and northwest. His campaigns paved the way for grander efforts to restore and expand Assyrian power under his successors, and the end of his reign marks the transition to the Neo-Assyrian period.

=== Neo-Assyrian period (911–609 BC) ===
==== Revitalization, expansion and dominance ====
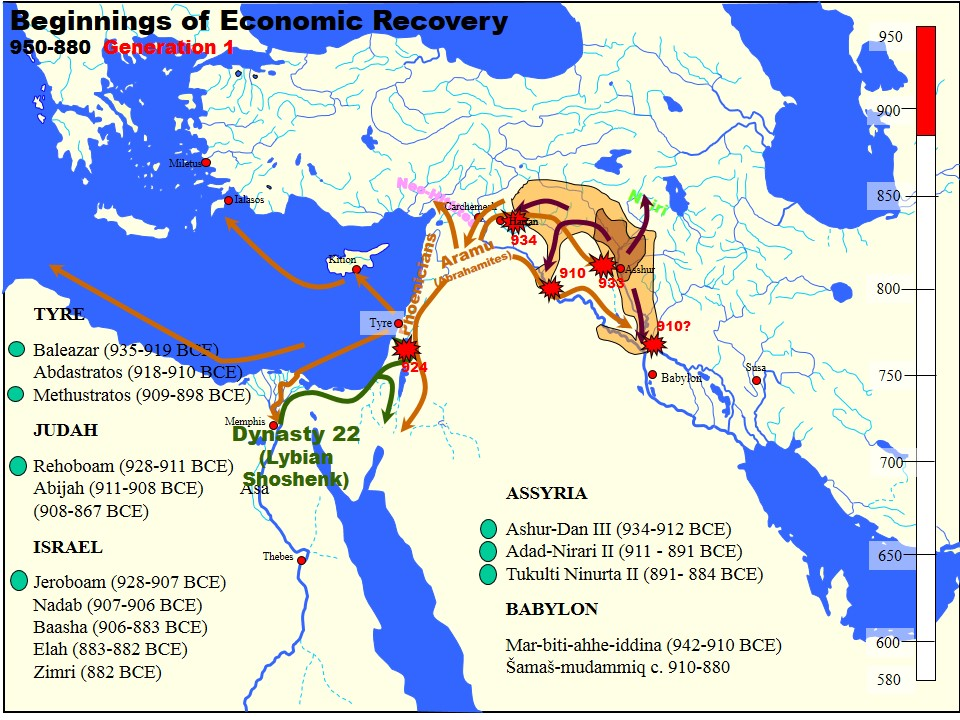
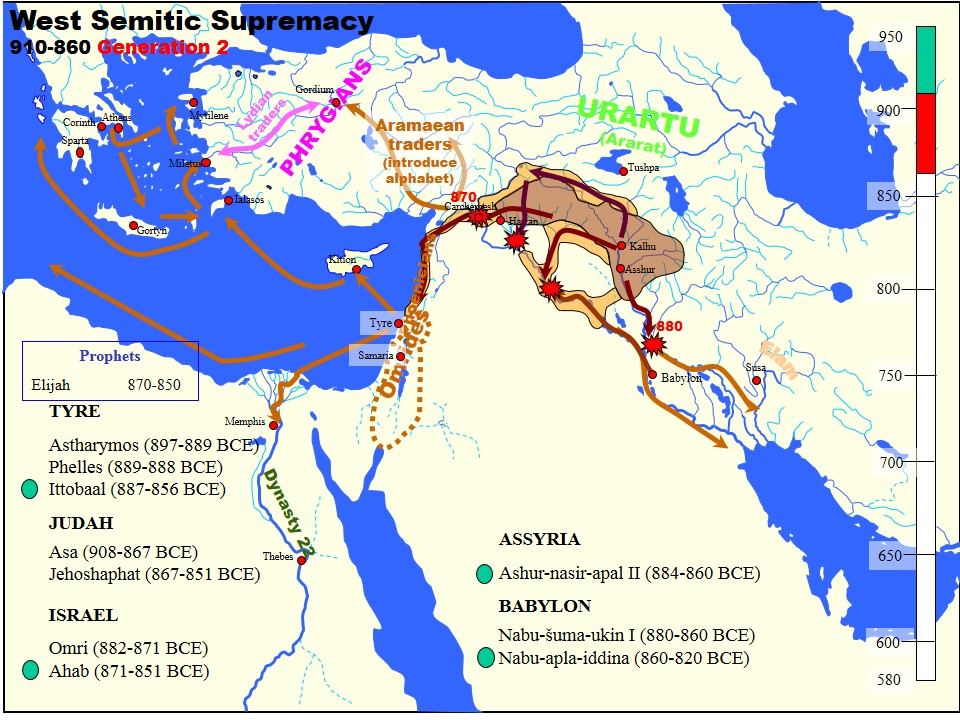
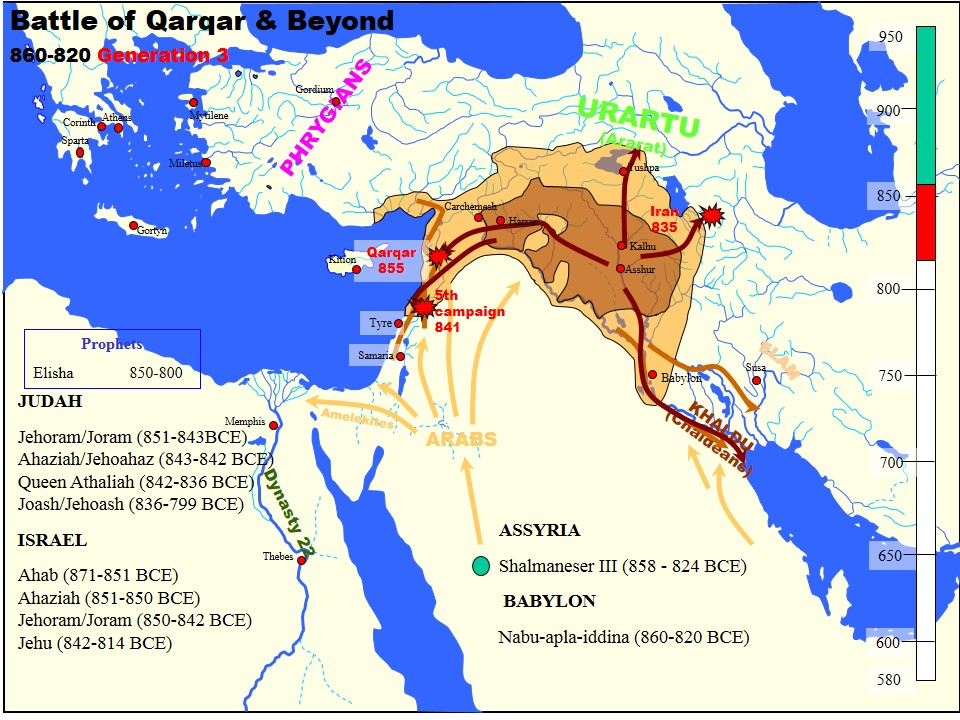
Assyrian borders and campaigns from Ashur-dan II (r. 934–912 BC) to Shalmaneser III (r. 859–824 BC)

Through decades of military conquests, the early Neo-Assyrian kings worked to retake the former lands of their empire and re-establish the position of Assyria as it was at the height of the Middle Assyrian Empire. The reigns of Adad-nirari II (r. 911–891 BC) and Tukulti-Ninurta II (r. 890–884 BC) saw the slow beginning of this project. Since the reconquista had to begun nearly from scratch, its eventual success was an extraordinary achievement. Adad-nirari's most important conquest was the reincorporation of the city of Arrapḫa (modern-day Kirkuk) into Assyria, which in later times served as the launching point of innumerable Assyrian campaigns to the east. Adad-nirari also managed to secure a border agreement with the Babylonian king Nabu-shuma-ukin I, a clear indicator that Assyrian power was on the rise. The second and more substantial phase of early Neo-Assyrian expansion began under Tukulti-Ninurta's son Ashurnasirpal II (r. 883–859 BC), whose conquests made the Neo-Assyrian Empire the dominant political power in the Near East.

One of Ashurnasirpal's most persistent enemies was the Aramean king Ahuni of Bit Adini. Ahuni's forces broke through across the Khabur and Euphrates several times and it was only after years of war that he at last accepted Ashurnasirpal as his suzerain. Ahuni's defeat was highly important since it marked the first time since Ashur-bel-kala (r. 1073–1056 BC), two centuries prior, that Assyrian forces had the opportunity to campaign further west than the Euphrates. Making use of this opportunity, Ashurnasirpal in his ninth campaign marched to the coast of the Mediterranean Sea, collecting tribute from various Phoenician, Aramean, Cilician, and Neo-Hittite kingdoms on the way. A significant development during Ashurnasirpal's reign was the second transfer of the Assyrian capital away from Assur. Ashurnasirpal restored the ancient and ruined town of Kalhu (the biblical Calah and Medieval Nimrud) also located in the Assyrian heartland, and in 879 BC designated that city as the new capital of the empire, employing thousands of workers to construct new fortifications, palaces and temples in the city. Though no longer the political capital, Assur remained the ceremonial and religious center of Assyria.

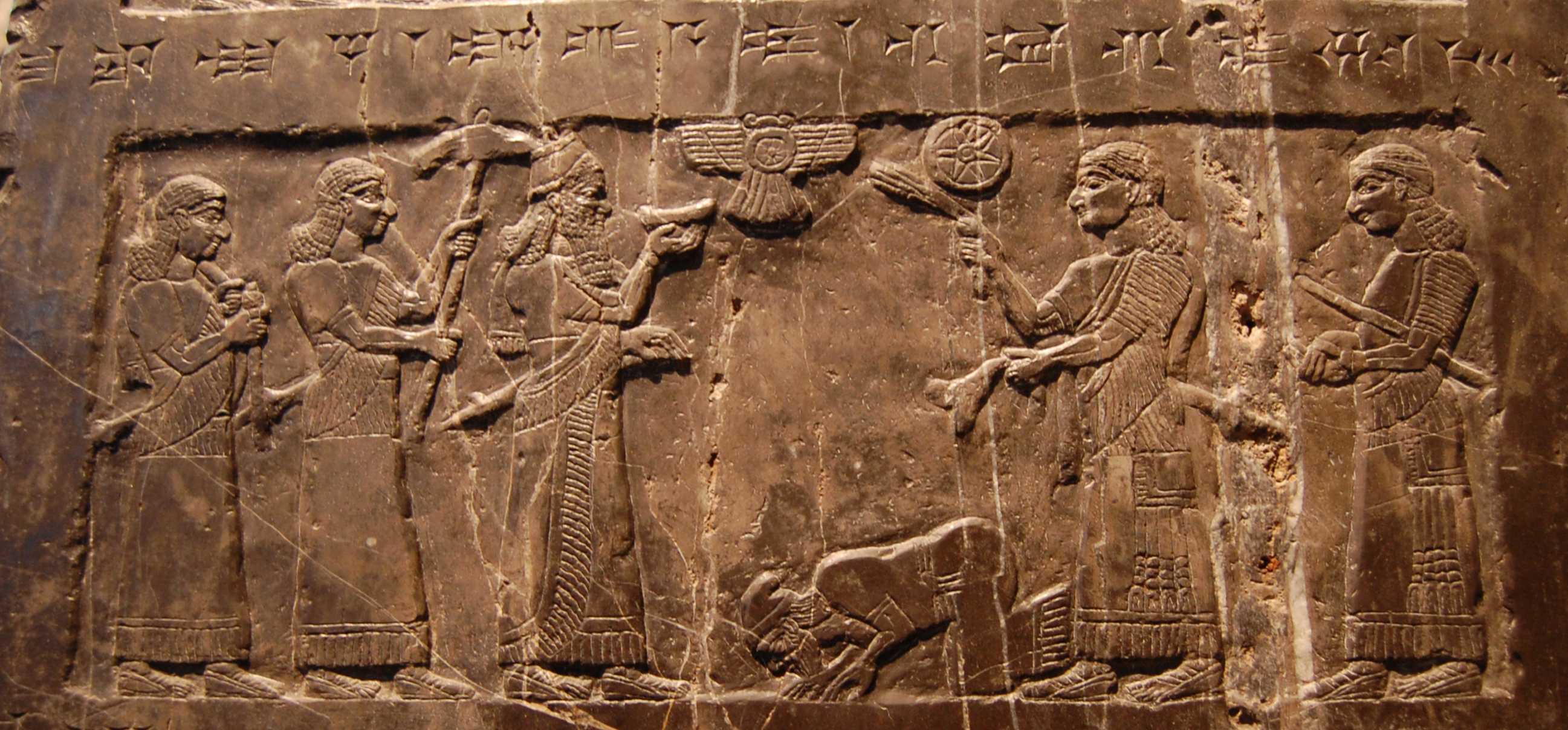
Shalmaneser III receiving the tribute of "Jehu of the people of the land of Omri", referring to Jehu, king of northern Israel, as depicted on the Black Obelisk c. 840 BC

The reign of Ashurnasirpal's son Shalmaneser III (r. 859–824 BC) also saw a considerable expansion of Assyrian territory. Lands conquered under Ashurnasirpal were consolidated and divided into further provinces and Shalmaneser's campaigns were also more wide-ranging than those of his predecessors. The most powerful and threatening enemy of Assyria at this point was the Hurro-Urartian speaking kingdom of Urartu in the north; following in the footsteps of the Assyrians, the Urartian administration, culture, writing system and religion closely followed those of Assyria. The Urartian kings were also autocrats very similar to the Assyrian kings. The imperialist expansionism of both states often led to military clashes, despite being separated by the Taurus Mountains. Shalmaneser for a time neutralized the Urartian threat after he in an ambitious campaign in 856 BC sacked the Urartian capital of Arzashkun and devastated the heartland of the kingdom. In 853 BC, Shalmaneser was forced to fight against a large coalition of western states assembled at Tell Qarqur in Syria, led by the Aramean Hadadezer, the king of Aram-Damascus. Though Shalmaneser fought them at the Battle of Qarqar in the same year, the battle appears to have been indecisive. After Qarqar, Shalmaneser focused on the south. He allied with the Babylonian king Marduk-zakir-shumi I, aiding his southern neighbor in both defeating the usurper Marduk-bel-ushati and in fighting against the migrating Chaldeans in the far south of Mesopotamia. After the death of Hadadezer in 841 BC, Shalmaneser managed to incorporate some further western territories. In the 830s, his armies reached into Cilicia and Cappadocia in Anatolia and in 836, Shalmaneser reached Ḫubušna (near modern-day Ereğli), one of the westernmost places ever reached by Assyrian forces. Though successful, Shalmaneser's conquests had been very quick and had not been fully consolidated by the time of his death.

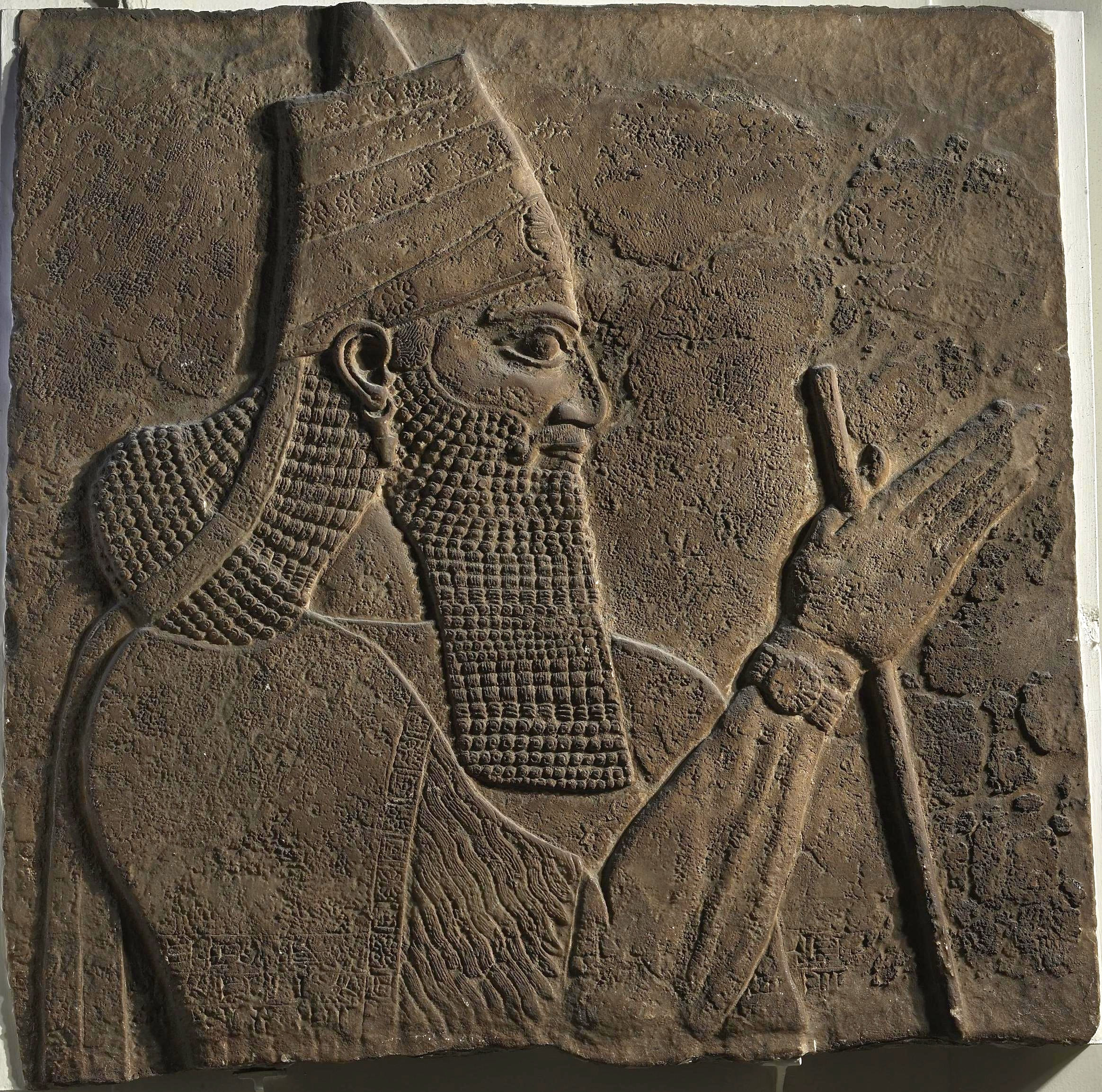
Partial relief depicting Tiglath-Pileser III (r. 745–727 BC)

From the late reign of Shalmaneser III onwards, the Neo-Assyrian Empire entered into what scholars call the "age of the magnates", when powerful officials and generals were the principal wielders of political power, rather than the king. The last few campaigns of Shalmaneser's reign were not led by the king, probably on account of old age, but rather by the capable turtanu (commander-in-chief) Dayyan-Assur. Shalmaneser's final years became preoccupied by an internal crisis when one of his sons, Ashur-danin-pal, rebelled in an attempt to seize the throne, possibly because the younger son Shamshi-Adad had been designated as heir instead of himself. When Shalmaneser died in 824 BC, Ashur-danin-pal was still in revolt, supported by a significant portion of the country, most notably the former capital of Assur. Shamshi-Adad acceded to the throne as Shamshi-Adad V, perhaps initially still a minor and a puppet of Dayyan-Assur. Though Dayyan-Assur died during the early stages of the civil war, Shamshi-Adad was eventually victorious, apparently due to help from the Babylonian king Marduk-zakir-shumi or his successor Marduk-balassu-iqbi. The age of the magnates is typically characterized as a period of decline, with little to no further territorial expansion and weak central power. This does not mean that there were no successes in this time. In 812 BC, Shamshi-Adad managed to termporarily conquer large portions of Babylonia and numerous campaigns were conducted under his son Adad-nirari III (r. 811–783 BC) which resulted in new territory both in the west and east. Early in Adad-nirari's reign, Adad-nirari and his mother Shammuramat (the inspiration for the mythical Assyrian queen Semiramis) expanded Assyrian control in Syria and Ancient Iran. The low point of the age of the magnates were the reigns of Adad-nirari's sons Shalmaneser IV (r. 783–773 BC), Ashur-dan III (r. 773–755 BC) and Ashur-nirari V (r. 755–745 BC), from which very few royal documents are known and officials grew even more bold, in some cases no longer even crediting the kings for their achievements.

Ashur-nirari V was succeeded by Tiglath-Pileser III (r. 745–727 BC), probably his brother and generally assumed to have usurped the throne. Tiglath-Pileser's accession ushered in a new age of the Neo-Assyrian Empire; while the conquests of earlier kings were impressive, they contributed little to Assyria's full rise as a consolidated empire. Through campaigns aimed at outright conquest and not just extraction of seasonal tribute, as well as reforms meant to efficiently organize the army and centralize the realm, Tiglath-Pileser is by some regarded as the first true initiator of Assyria's "imperial" phase. Tiglath-Pileser is the earliest Assyrian king mentioned in the Babylonian Chronicles and in the Hebrew Bible and thus the earliest king for which there exists important outside perspectives on his reign. Early on, Tiglath-Pileser reduced the influence of the powerful magnates. Tiglath-Pileser campaigned in all directions with resounding success. His most impressive achievements were the conquest and vassalization of the entirety of the Levant all the way to the Sinai and Egyptian border, his domination of the Persians and Medes to the east, the Arabs to the south of Babylonia, and the 729 conquest of Babylonia, after which he and later Assyrian kings often ruled as both "king of Assyria" and "king of Babylon". By the time of his death in 727 BC, Tiglath-Pileser had more than doubled the territory of the empire. His policy of direct rule rather than rule through vassal states brought important changes to the Assyrian state and its economy; rather than tribute, the empire grew more reliant on taxes collected by provincial governors, a development which increased administrative costs but also reduced the need for military intervention. Also noteworthy was the large scale in which Tiglath-Pileser undertook resettlement policies, settling tens, if not hundreds, of thousand foreigners in both the Assyrian heartland and in far-away underdeveloped provinces.

==== Sargonid dynasty ====
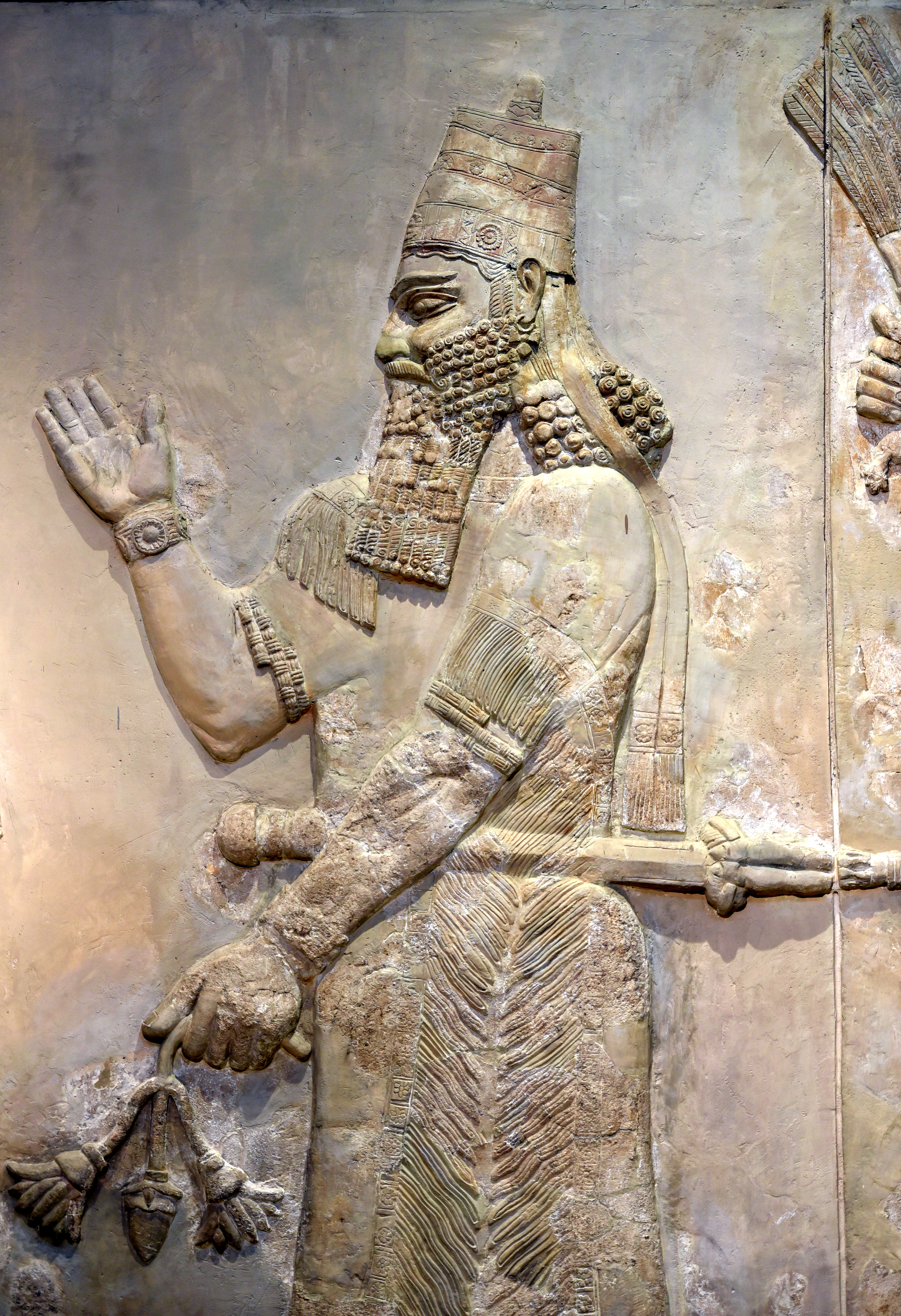
Sargon II
(r. 722–705 BC)

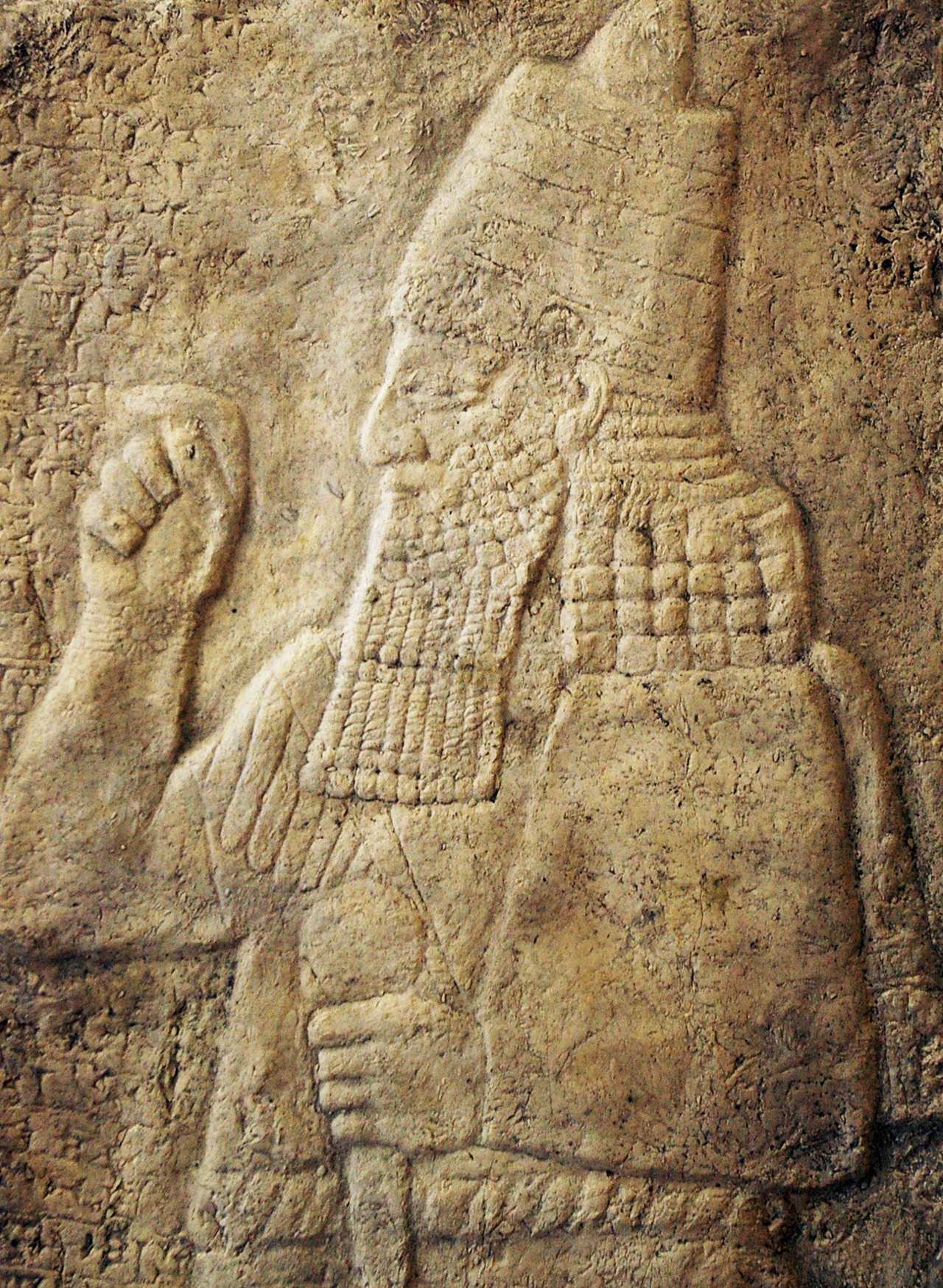
Sennacherib
(r. 705–681 BC)

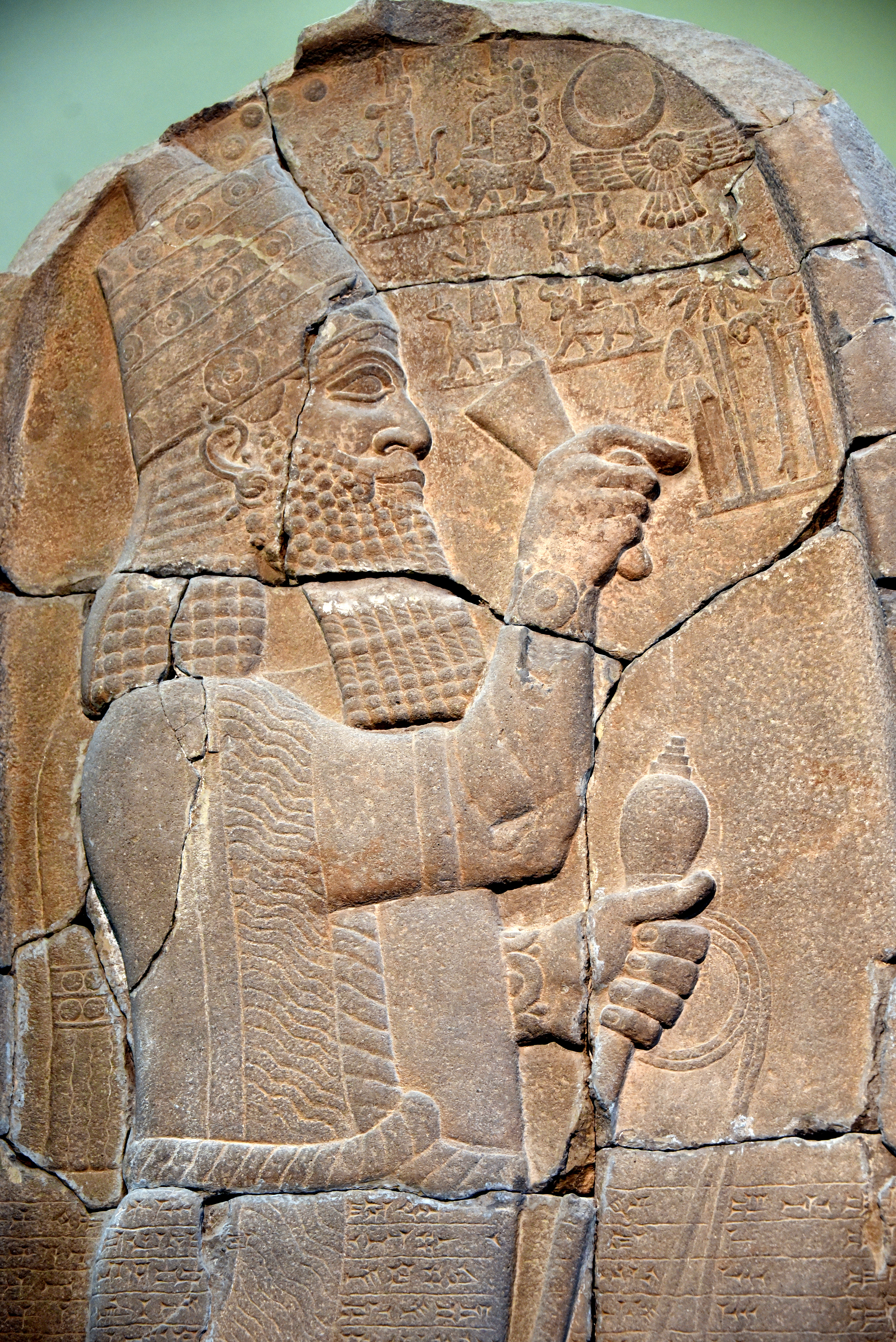
Esarhaddon
(r. 681–669 BC)

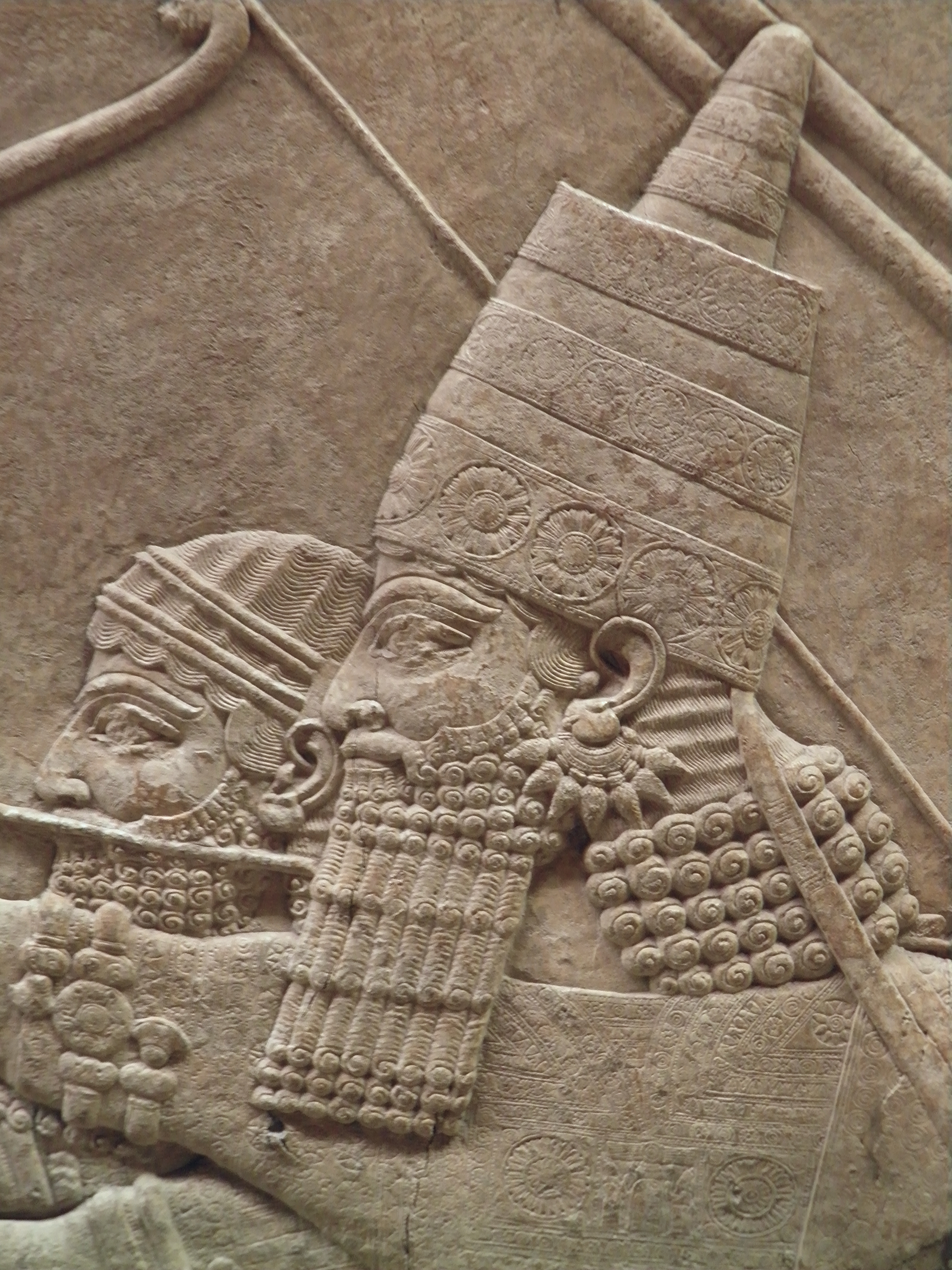
Ashurbanipal
(r. 669–631 BC)

Tiglath-Pileser's son Shalmaneser V (r. 727–722 BC) was after only a brief reign usurped by Sargon II (r. 722–705 BC), either his brother or a non-dynastic usurper. Sargon founded the Sargonid dynasty, which would rule until the fall of the Assyrian Empire. Sargon's accession, possible marking the end of the nearly thousand-year long Adaside dynasty, was met with considerable internal unrest. In his own inscriptions Sargon claims to have deported 6,300 "guilty Assyrians", probably Assyrians from the heartland who opposed his accession. Several peripheral regions of the empire also revolted and regained their independence. The most significant of the revolts was the successful uprising of the Chaldean warlord Marduk-apla-iddina II, who took control of Babylon, restoring Babylonian independence, and allied with the Elamite king Ḫuban‐nikaš I. While Sargon was campaigning in the east in 720 BC, his generals also put down a major revolt in the western provinces, led by Yau-bi'di of Hamath.

After securing the silver treasury of the city of Carchemish in 717 BC, Sargon began construction of another new imperial capital. The new city was named Dur-Sharrukin ("Fort Sargon") after himself. Unlike Ashurnasirpal's project at Nimrud, Sargon was not simply expanding an existing, albeit ruined, site but building a new settlement from scratch. Sargon was militarily successful and frequently went to war. Between just 716 and 713, Sargon fought against Urartu, the Medes, Arab tribes, and Ionian pirates in the eastern Mediterranean. In 710 BC, Sargon retook Babylon, driving Marduk-apla-iddina into exile in Elam. Between 710 and 707 BC, Sargon resided in Babylon, receiving foreign delegations there and participating in local traditions, such as the Akitu festival. In 707 BC, Sargon returned to Nimrud and in 706 BC, Dur-Sharrukin was inaugurated as the empire's new capital. Sargon did not get to enjoy his new city for long; in 705 BC he embarked on his final campaign, directed against Tabal, and died in battle in Anatolia.

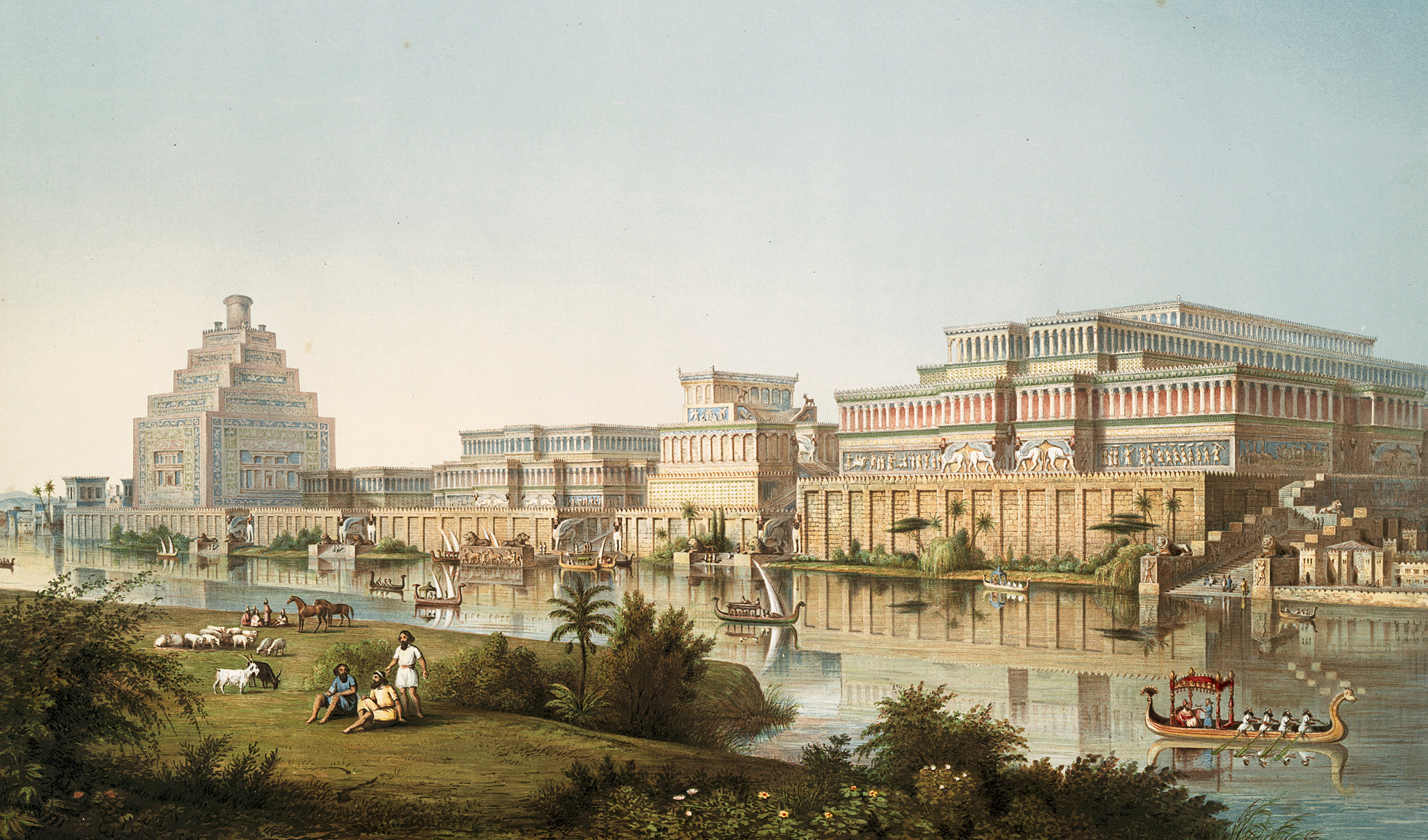
19th-century reconstruction of Nineveh, made capital under Sennacherib

Sargon's son Sennacherib (r. 705–681 BC) moved the capital to Nineveh, which was extensively renovated in his reign. Sargon's battlefield death had theological implications and some of the conquered regions of the empire once again began to assert their right to independence. Most prominently, the vassal states in the Levant stopped paying tribute to Sennacherib and Marduk-apla-iddina retook Babylon with the aid of the Elamites. It took several years for Sennacherib to defeat all of his enemies. Towards the end of 704 BC, Sennacherib retook Babylonia, though Marduk-apla-iddina escaped to Elam again. The Babylonian noble Bel-ibni, raised at the Assyrian court was appointed as vassal ruler of Babylon. In 701 BC, Sennacherib invaded the Levant, the most famous campaign of his reign. Bel-ibni's tenure as Babylonian vassal ruler did not last long and he was continually opposed by Marduk-apla-iddina and another Chaldean warlord, Mushezib-Marduk, who hoped to seize power for themselves. In 700 BC, Sennacherib invaded Babylonia again and drove Marduk-apla-iddina and Mushezib-Marduk away. Needing a vassal ruler with stronger authority, he placed his eldest son Ashur-nadin-shumi on the Babylonian throne.

In 694 BC, Sennacherib invaded Elam with the explicit goal to root out Marduk-apla-iddina and his supporters. Sennacherib sailed across the Persian Gulf with a fleet built by Phoenician and Greek shipwrights and captured and sacked countless Elamite cities. He never got his revenge on Marduk-apla-iddina, who died of natural causes before the Assyrian army landed, and the campaign instead significantly escalated the conflict with the anti-Assyrian faction in Babylonia and with the Elamites. The Elamite king Hallushu-Inshushinak took revenge on Sennacherib by marching on Babylonia while the Assyrians were busy in his lands and captured Ashur-nadin-shumi, who was taken to Elam and probably executed. In his place, the Elamites and Babylonians crowned the Babylonian noble Nergal-ushezib as king of Babylon. Sennacherib defeated Nergal-ushezib a few months later, but Mushezib-Marduk seized Babylon in late 693 BC and continued the struggle. In 689 BC, Sennacherib defeated Mushezib-Marduk and nearly completely destroyed Babylon. Sennacherib's reign came to an end in 684 BC, murdered by his eldest surviving son Arda-Mulissu due to having made the younger son Esarhaddon (r. 681–669 BC) heir. Esarhaddon defeated Arda-Mulissu in a civil war and successfully captured Nineveh, becoming king a mere two months after Sennacherib's murder.

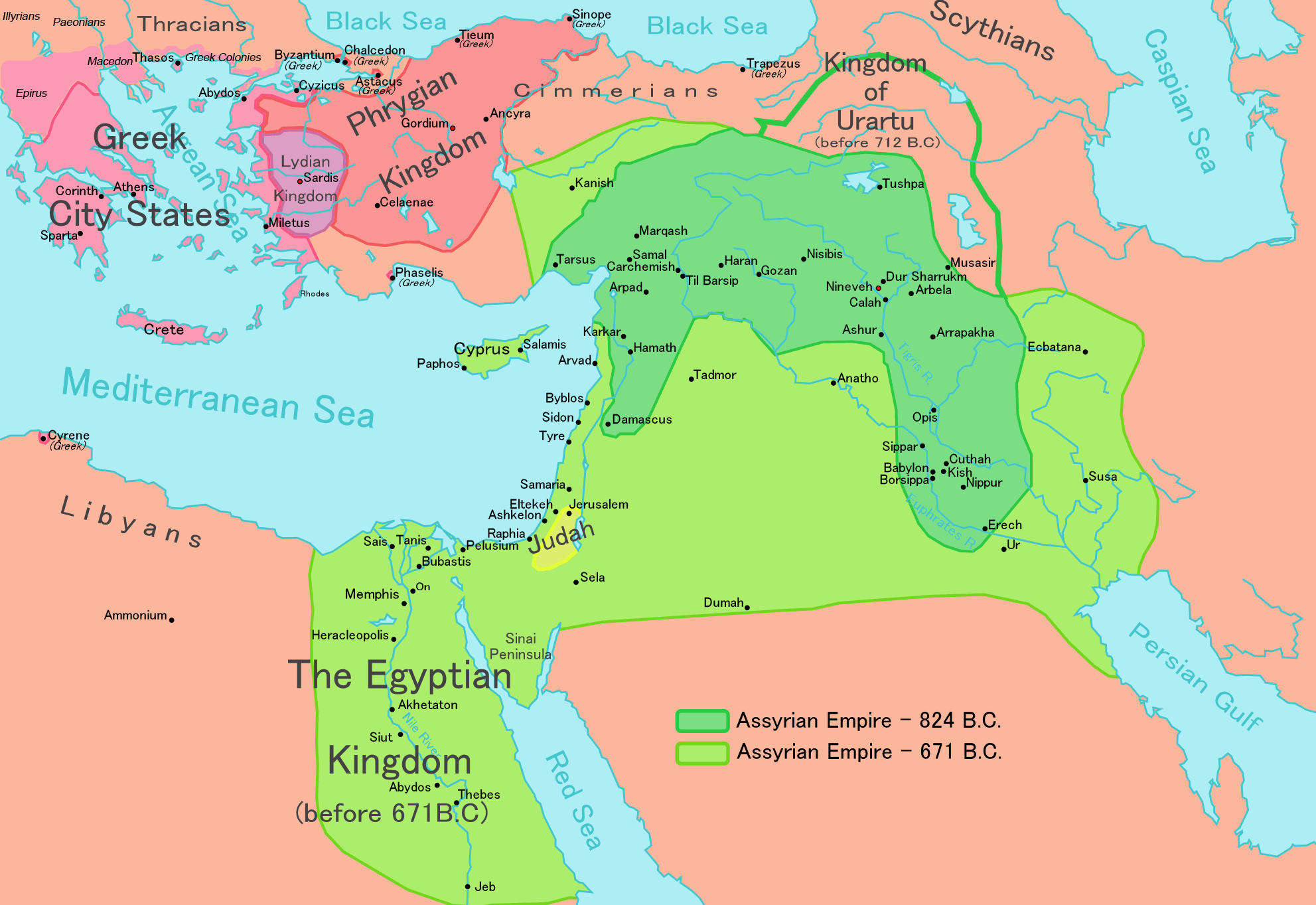
Map of the Neo-Assyrian Empire at its greatest extent, under Esarhaddon

Esarhaddon was deeply troubled, distrustful of his officials and family members owing to his tumultuous rise to the throne. His paranoia had the side-effect of leading to an increased standing of the royal women; his mother Naqi'a, queen Esharra-hammat and daughter Serua-eterat were all more powerful and prominent than most women in earlier Assyrian history. Despite his paranoia, and despite suffering from both disease and depression, Esarhaddon was one of Assyria's most successful kings. He rebuilt Babylon and led several successful military campaigns. Many of his campaigns were farther from the Assyrian heartland than those of any previous king. In the east, he in one campaign reached as far into modern-day Iran as Dasht-e Kavir. Esarhaddon's greatest military achievement was the 671 BC conquest of Egypt, which not only placed a land of great cultural prestige under Esarhaddon's rule but also brought the Assyrian Empire to its greatest ever extent. Despite his successes, Esarhaddon faced numerous conspiracies against his rule, perhaps because the king suffering from illness could be seen as the gods withdrawing their divine support for his rule. Through a well-developed network of spies and informants, Esarhaddon uncovered all of these coup attempts and in 670 BC had a large number of high-ranking officials put to death. In 672 BC, Esarhaddon decreed that his younger son Ashurbanipal (r. 669–631 BC) would succeed him in Assyria and that the older son Shamash-shum-ukin would rule Babylon. To ensure that the succession to the throne after his own death would go more smoothly than his own accession, Esarhaddon forced everyone in the empire, not only the prominent officials but also far-away vassal rulers and members of the royal family, to swear oaths of allegiance to the successors and respect the arrangement.

Ashurbanipal is often regarded to have been the last great king of Assyria. His reign saw the last time Assyrian troops marched in all directions of the Near East. One of the issues of Ashurbanipal's early reign were disagreements between Ashurbanipal and Shamash-shum-ukin. While Esarhaddon's documents suggest that Shamash-shum-ukin was intended to inherit all of Babylonia, it appears that he only controlled the immediate vicinity of Babylon itself since numerous other Babylonian cities apparently ignored him and considered Ashurbanipal to be their king. Over time, it seems that Shamash-shum-ukin grew to resent his brother's overbearing control and he revolted in 652 BC, aided by several Elamite kings. Ashurbanipal defeated his brother in 648 BC and Shamash-shum-ukin might have died by setting himself on fire in his palace. As vassal king of Babylon he was replaced by the puppet ruler Kandalanu. After his victory in Babylonia, Ashurbanipal marched on Elam. The Elamite capital of Susa was captured and devastated and large numbers of Elamite prisoners were brought to Nineveh, tortured and humiliated.

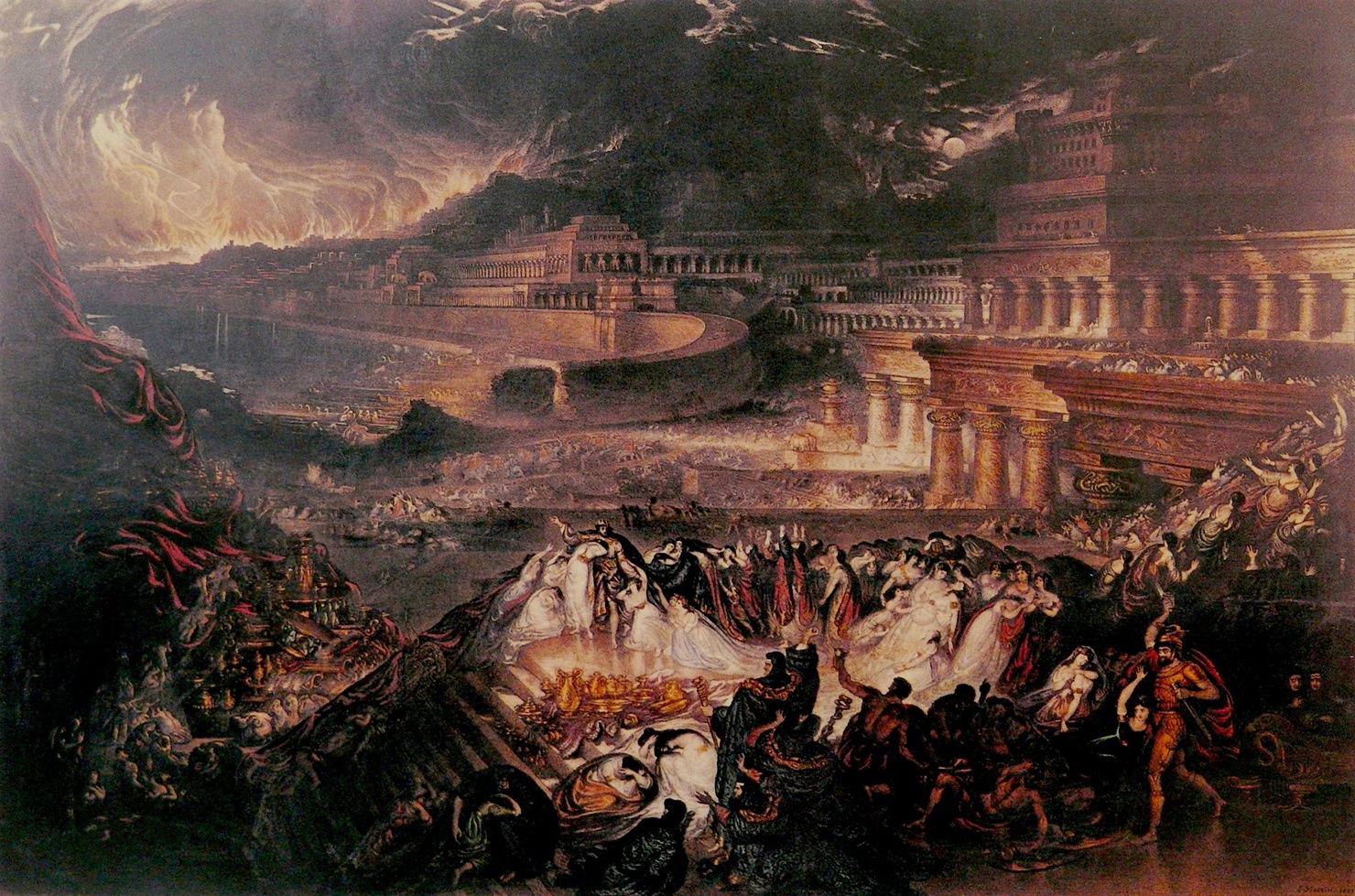
Fall of Nineveh (1829) by John Martin

Though Ashurbanipal's inscriptions present Assyria as an uncontested and divinely supported hegemon of the entire world, cracks were starting to form in the empire during his reign. At some point after 656 BC, the empire lost control of Egypt, which instead fell into the hands of the pharaoh Psamtik I, founder of Egypt's twenty-sixth dynasty, originally appointed as a vassal by Ashurbanipal. Assyrian control faded from Egypt only gradually, without the need for revolt. Ashurbanipal went on numerous campaigns against various Arab tribes which failed to consolidate rule over their lands and instead wasted Assyrian resources. Perhaps most importantly, his devastation of Babylon after defeating Shamash-shum-ukin fanned anti-Assyrian sentiments in southern Mesopotamia, which soon after his death would have disastrous consequences. Ashurbanipal's reign also appears to have seen a growing disconnect between the king and the traditional elite of the empire; eunuchs grew unprecedently powerful in his time, being granted large tracts of lands and numerous tax exemptions. After Ashurbanipal's death in 631 BC, the Neo-Assyrian Empire quickly collapsed. His son and successor Ashur-etil-ilani ruled only briefly before another son of Ashurbanipal, Sinsharishkun, became king in 627 BC. In 626 BC Babylonia revolted again, this time led by Nabopolassar, probably a member of a prominent political family in Uruk. Though Nabopolassar was more successful than previous Babylonian rebels, it is unlikely that he would have been victorious in the end had the Medes under Cyaxares not entered the conflict in 615/614 BC. In 614 BC, the Medes and Babylonians sacked and destroyed Assur and in 612 BC, they captured and plundered Nineveh, Sinsharishkun dying in the capital's defense. Though the prince Ashur-uballit II, possibly Sinsharishkun's son, attempted to lead the resistance against the Medes and Babylonians from Harran in the west, he was defeated in 609 BC, marking the end of the ancient line of Assyrian kings and of Assyria as a state.

=== Post-imperial period (609 BC–AD 240) ===
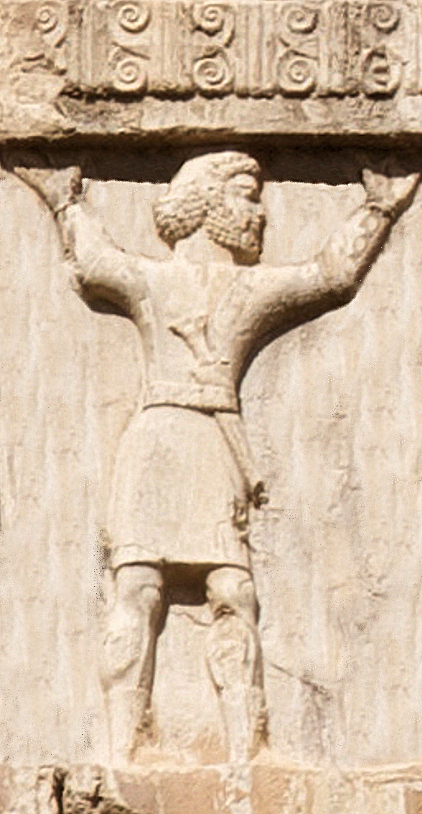
Depiction of an Assyrian soldier on the tomb of the Achaemenid king Xerxes I at Naqsh-e Rostam

The fall of the Neo-Assyrian Empire after its final war with the Babylonians and Medes had dramatic consequences for the geopolitics of the ancient Near East: Babylonia, now the heart of the Neo-Babylonian Empire, experienced an unprecedented time of prosperity and growth, trade routes were redrawn and the economical organization and political power of the entire region was restructured. Archaeological surveys of the Assyrian heartland have consistently shown that there was a dramatic decrease in the size and number of inhabited sites in Assyria during the Neo-Babylonian period, suggesting a significant societal breakdown in the region. Archaeological evidence suggests that the former Assyrian capital cities, such as Assur, Nimrud and Nineveh, were initially nearly completely abandoned. The breakdown in society does not necessarily reflect an enormous drop in population; it is clear that the region became less rich and less densely populated, but it is also clear that Assyria was not entirely uninhabited, nor poor in any real sense. It is possible that large portions of the remaining Assyrian populace might have turned to nomadism due to the collapse of the local settlements and economy. Throughout the time of the Neo-Babylonian and later Achaemenid Empire, Assyria was a marginal and sparsely populated region, perhaps chiefly due to the limited interest of the Neo-Babylonian kings to invest resources into its economic and societal development. Individuals with Assyrian names are attested at multiple sites in Babylonia during the Neo-Babylonian Empire, including Babylon itself, Nippur, Uruk, Sippar, Dilbat and Borsippa. The Assyrians in Uruk apparently continued to exist as a community until the reign of the Achaemenid king Cambyses II (r. 530–522 BC) and were closely linked to a local cult dedicated to Ashur. Towards the end of the 6th century BC, the Assyrian dialect of the Akkadian language went extinct, having towards the end of the Neo-Assyrian Empire already largely been replaced by Aramaic as a vernacular language.

After the Achaemenid conquest of Babylon in 539 BC, Assyria was incorporated into the Achaemenid Empire, organized into the province (Note: Though often referred to as a satrapy by modern historians, Assyria appears in Achaemenid royal inscriptions as a dahyu; a term of uncertain implications used to refer to both peoples and geographical locations (not necessarily synonymous with the formal satrapies of the empire).) Athura (Aθūrā). Some former Assyrian territory was also incorporated into the satrapy of Media (Mada). Though Assyrians from both Athura and Media joined forces in an unsuccessful revolt against the Achaemenid king Darius the Great in 520 BC, relations with the Achaemenid rulers were otherwise relatively peaceful. The Achaemenid kings interfered little with the internal affairs of their individual provinces as long as tribute and taxes were continuously provided, which allowed Assyrian culture and customs to survive under Persian rule. After the Achaemenid conquest of Babylon, the remaining inhabitants of Assur received the permission of Cyrus the Great to rebuild the city's ancient temple dedicated to Ashur and Cyrus even returned Ashur's cult statue from Babylon. The organization of Assyria into the single administrative unit Athura effectively kept the region on the map as a distinct political entity throughout the time of Achaemenid rule. In the aftermath of the Achaemenid Empire's conquest by Alexander the Great in 330 BC, Assyria and much of the rest of the former Achaemenid lands came under the control of the Seleucid Empire, founded by Seleucus I Nicator, one of Alexander's generals. Though Assyria was centrally located within this empire, and must thus have been a significant base of power, the region is rarely mentioned in textual sources from the period, perhaps because the significant centers of the Seleucid Empire was in the south in Babylon and Seleucia and in the west in Antioch. There were however significant developments in Assyria during this time. Archaeological finds such as coins and pottery from prominent Assyrian sites indicate that cities such as Assur, Nimrud and perhaps Nineveh were resettled under the Seleucids, as were a large number of villages.

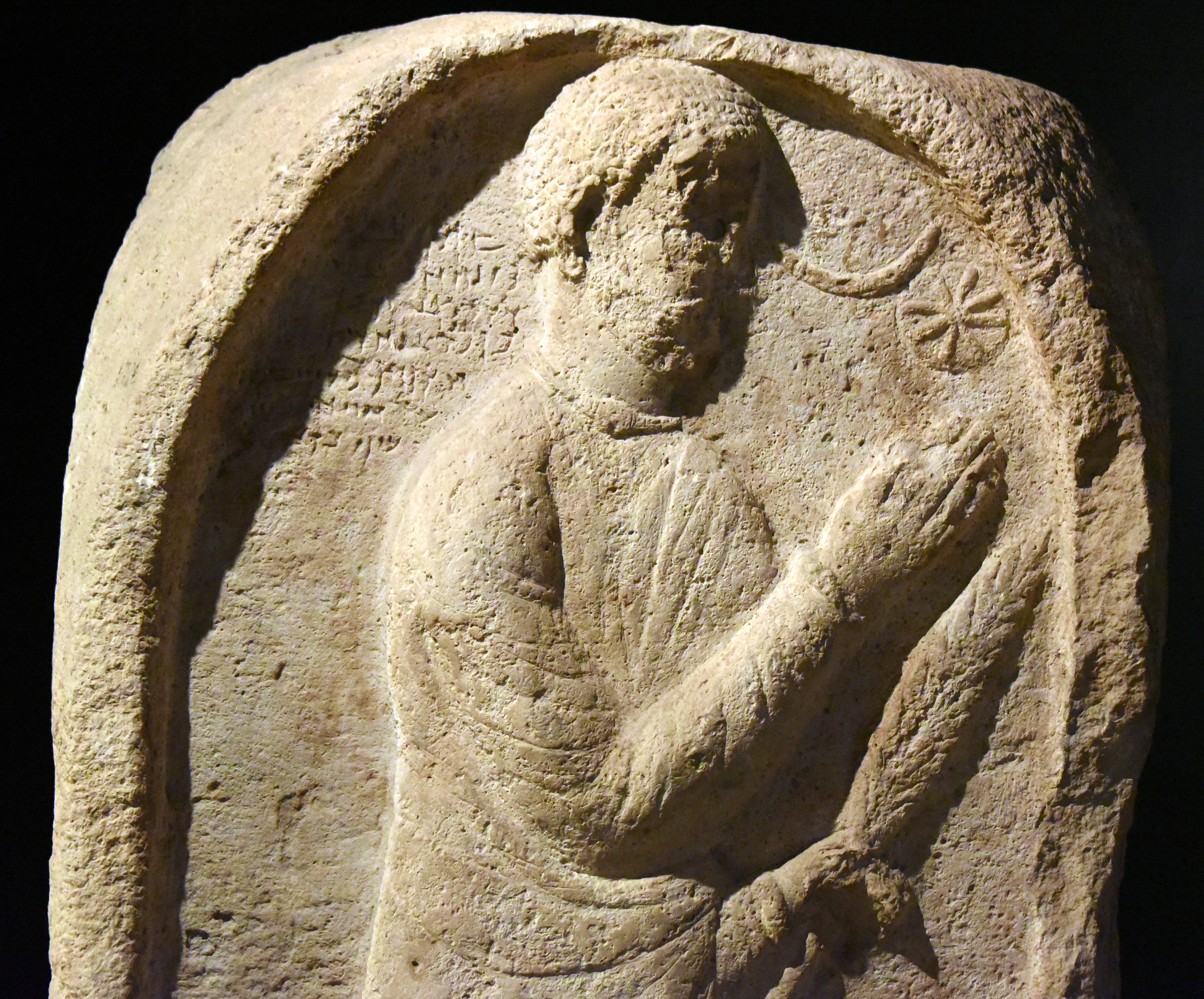
Detail of a stele in the style of the Neo-Assyrian royal steles erected in Assur in the 2nd century AD (under Parthian rule) by the local ruler Rʻuth-Assor

The most significant phase of ancient Assyrian history following the fall of the Neo-Assyrian Empire transpired after the region was conquered by the Parthian Empire in the 2nd century BC. Under Parthian rule, the slow recovery of Assyria initiated under the Seleucids continued. This process eventually resulted in an unprecedented return to prosperity and revival in the 1st to 3rd centuries AD. The Parthians oversaw an intense resettlement and rebuilding of the region. In this time, the archaeological evidence shows that the population and settlement density of the region reached heights not seen since the Neo-Assyrian Empire. Under Parthian suzerainty, several small and semi-independent kingdoms of Assyrian character and large Assyrian populations cropped up in the former Assyrian heartland, including Osroene, Adiabene and Hatra. These kingdoms lasted until the 3rd or 4th centuries AD, though they were mostly ruled by dynasties of Iranian or Arab, not Assyrian, descent and culture. Aspects of old Assyrian culture endured in these new kingdoms, despite their foreign rulers. For instance, the main god worshipped at Hatra was the old Mesopotamian sun-god Shamash. Assur itself flourished under Parthian rule, with a large amount of buildings being either repaired or constructed from scratch. From around or shortly after the end of the 2nd century BC, the city may have become the capital of its own small semi-autonomous realm, either under the suzerainty of Hatra, or under direct Parthian suzerainty. Stelae erected by the local rulers of Assur in this time resemble the stelae erected by the Neo-Assyrian kings, the rulers appearing to have viewed themselves as continuing the old Assyrian royal tradition. The ancient temple dedicated to Ashur was restored for a second time in the 2nd century AD. Ancient Assyria's last golden age came to an end with the sack of Assur by the Sasanian Empire c. 240. During the sack, the Ashur temple was destroyed again and the city's population was dispersed.

== Late antiquity and Middle Ages (240–1552) ==
=== Assyria under the Sasanian Empire (240–637) ===
==== Christianization ====
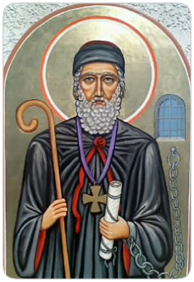
Modern icon of Aba I, Patriarch of the Assyrian Church of the East 540–552

Though tradition holds that Christianity was first spread to Mesopotamia by Thomas the Apostle, the exact timespan when the Assyrians were first Christianized is unknown. The city of Arbela was an important early Christian center. According to the later Chronicle of Arbela, Arbela became the seat of a bishop already in AD 100, but the reliability of this document is questioned among scholars. It is known that both Arbela and Kirkuk later served as important Assyrian Christian centers in the Sasanian and later Islamic periods. According to some traditions, Christianity took hold in Assyria when Saint Thaddeus of Edessa converted King Abgar V of Osroene in the mid-1st century AD. From the 3rd century AD onwards, it is clear that Christianity was becoming the major religion of the region, with the Christian god replacing the old Mesopotamian deities. Assyrians had by this time already intellectually contributed to Christian thought; in the 1st century AD, the Christian Assyrian writer Tatian composed the influential Diatessaron, a synoptic rendition of the gospels.

Assyrian Christians were periodically persecuted in the Sasanian Empire until 422, when the Roman Empire instituted tolerance for Zoroastrianism (the official Persian religion in ancient times) and the Sasanians in turn officially allowed Christianity. The Assyrian churches became separate from those of the wider Christian world in the aftermath of the 451 Council of Chalcedon, which was rejected by the groups that would later be known as the Assyrian Church of the East and the Syriac Orthodox Church. The followers of the Church of the East where often pejoratively referred to as "Nestorians" by foreigners in later times, after Nestorius (c. 386–450), an Archbishop of Constantinople whose teachings, including denying the hypostatic union (that Jesus was both fully God and fully man), were condemned at Chalcedon. The followers of the Syriac Orthodox Church were often called "Jacobites", after Jacob Baradaeus, an anti-Chalcedon bishop of Edessa. The Sasanians, who geopolitically opposed the Romans and often found themselves at war with them, deliberately cultivated and supported the now schismatic Church of the East. In 421, the Synod of Markabta decided that the head of the church, now styled as the Patriarch of the Church of the East, was declared answerable only to Christ himself, in effect declaring the Church of the East independent. The church's independence was upheld under the authority of the Sasanian King of Kings Jamasp, who in 497 authorized a synod which also declared it independent and abolished the rule of celibacy for the clergy.

==== Histories and folklore ====
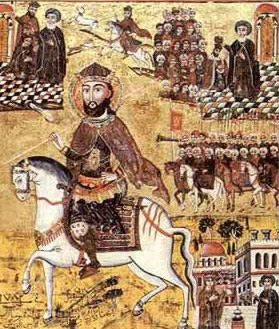
A later medieval icon depicting Saints Behnam, Sarah, and the Forty Martyrs

Though once more without any real political power, the population of northern Mesopotamia (called Asoristan by the Sassanids) continued to keep the memory of their ancient civilization alive and positively connected with the Assyrian Empire in local histories written during the Sasanian period. There continued to be important continuities between ancient and contemporary Mesopotamia in terms of religion, literary culture and settlement and Christians in northern Mesopotamia during the Sasanian period and later times connected themselves to the ancient Assyrian civilization. (Note: How terms such as "Assyrian" were used varied considerably between authors, however. Some Christians used "Assyrian" (aturaya) and "Assyria" (atur) only in a geographical, and not necessarily ethnic, sense. Though evidence of Christians in the Sasanian period self-identifying as "Assyrians" is generally scarcer than in earlier times, it is not wholly absent and it is clear that the Assyrians continued to survive as a group. The 2nd-century Christian writer Tatian is expressly identified as self-identifying as "Assyrian" in the surviving sources. There also exists several known references to the "land of the Assyrians", in Aramaic referring to the region of ancient Assyria. The later 12th-century Michael the Syrian, also expressly used Suryayē (i.e. Assyrians) as a name for the people.) Figures like Sargon II, Sennacherib, Esarhaddon, Ashurbanipal and Shamash-shum-ukin long figured in local folklore and literary tradition. In large part, tales from the Sasanian period and later times were invented narratives, based on ancient Assyrian history but applied to local and current landscapes. Medieval tales written in Aramaic (or Syriac) for instance by and large characterize Sennacherib as an archetypical pagan king assassinated as part of a family feud, whose children convert to Christianity. The legend of the Saints Behnam and Sarah, set in the 4th century but written long thereafter, casts Sennacherib, under the name Sinharib, as their royal father. After Behnam converts to Christianity, Sinharib orders his execution, but is later struck by a dangerous disease that is cured through being baptized by Saint Matthew in Assur. Thankful, Sinharib then converts to Christianity and founds an important monastery near Mosul, called Deir Mar Mattai.

The 7th-century Assyrian History of Mar Qardagh made the titular saint, Mar Qardagh, out to be a descendant of the legendary Biblical Mesopotamian king Nimrod and the historical Sennacherib, with his illustrious descent manifesting in Mar Qardagh's mastery of archery, hunting and polo. A sanctuary constructed for Mar Qardagh during this time was built directly on top of the ruins of a Neo-Assyrian temple. Though some historians have argued that these tales were based only on the Bible, and not actual remembrance of ancient Assyria, some figures who appear in them, such as Esarhaddon and Sargon II, are only briefly mentioned in the Bible. The texts are also very much a local Assyrian phenomenon, as their historical accounts are at odds with those of other historical writings of the Sasanian Empire. The legendary figure Nimrod, otherwise viewed as simply Mesopotamian, is explicitly referred to as Assyrian in many of the Sasanian-period texts and is inserted into the line of Assyrian kings. Nimrod, as well as other legendary Mesopotamian (though explicitly Assyrian in the texts) rulers, such as Belus and Ninus, sometimes play significant roles in the writings. Certain Christian texts considered the Biblical figure Balaam to have prophesied the Star of Bethlehem; a local Assyrian version of this narrative appears in some Syriac-language writings from the Sasanian period, which allege that Balaam's prophecy was remembered only through being transmitted through the ancient Assyrian kings. In some stories, explicit claims of descent are made. According to the 6th-century History of Karka, twelve of the noble families of Karka (ancient Arrapḫa) were descendants of ancient Assyrian nobility who lived in the city during the time of Sargon II.

==== Āsōristān, Atūria and Nōdšīragān ====
Map of northern Mesopotamia in late antiquity, with names of cities and regions. The region was throughout the period divided between the Roman and Sasanian empires

The Sasanian Empire confusingly (Note: The name Āsōristān for the land covering southern Mesopotamia has not only confused several modern scholars, but was already confusing to scholars in ancient times; in the writings of the 4th-century Roman historian Ammianus Marcellinus, Āsōristān is confused with ancient Assyria.) applied the name Āsōristān ("land of the Assyrians") to a province corresponding roughly to the borders of ancient Babylonia, thus excluding the historical Assyria in northern Mesopotamia. The population of Southern Mesopotamia was however during this time also largely made up of Aramaic-speaking Christians. The reason for naming Babylonia Āsōristān is not clear; perhaps the name originated during a time when northern Mesopotamia was occupied by the Roman Empire (and thus designated the remaining part of Mesopotamia under Sasanian control) or perhaps the name derived from the Sasanians also making the connection between the present Aramaic-speaking Christians of the regions and the ancient Assyrians.

Syriac-language sources continued to connect the term "land of the Assyrians" not to the Sasanian province in the south, but to the ancient Assyrian heartland in the north. Armenian historians, such as Anania Shirakatsi, also continued to identify Assyria as northern Mesopotamia; Shirakatsi referred to Aruastan as a region bordering Armenia and including Nineveh. The Sasanians divided northern Mesopotamia into Arbāyistān in the west and Nōdšīragān in the east. Nōdšīragān was the Sasanian name for Adiabene, which included much of the old Assyrian lands and continued to function as a vassal kingdom under Sasanian rule as well, perhaps (at least at times) ruled by Sasanian princes. A handful of Sasanian sources made the connection between northern Mesopotamia and Assyria as well, despite Āsōristān being used for the south. The province of Nōdšīragān is in some records alternatively referred to as Atūria or Āthōr (i.e. Assyria). Records from a 585 synod also testify to the existence of a metropolitan bishop of the Āṯōrayē (Assyrians), who was from northern Mesopotamia.

The Adiabene vassal kingdom was abolished c. 379, with Adiabene thereafter being governed by royally appointed governors. Because of the size and wealth of the region, these governors, though not kings, could still be influential. In the 6th-century, one such governor, Denḥa bar Šemraita, is referred to as "grand prince of all the region of Adiabene".

=== Muslim conquest (637–1096) ===
Approximate map of the al-Jazira region, which covered much of the Assyrian heartland under the Rashidun, Umayyad and Abbasid caliphates

With the fall of Ctesiphon in 637, the Sasanian Empire lost control of its political heartland in Mesopotamia, which instead fell under the rule of the Rashidun Caliphate. Due to missionary work by the Church of the East, a significant share of the population in Mesopotamia and Persia were Christian by the time of the Muslim conquests. Episcopal sees had been established as far from Mesopotamia as Uzbekistan, India and China. Though the new caliphate did not officially persecute its Christian subjects, and even offered freedom of worship and a certain extent of self-administration, there were many local Muslim administrators who acted against the Christians, and as non-Muslims conquered through jihad, Christians such as the Assyrians had a choice between conversion to Islam, death, slavery or relegation to dhimmi, paying a special tax (jizya) to live under protected status. Some local Christians fled from the conquered territories into the lands under Roman rule and some, probably few in number, chose to convert to Islam for economic or political reasons. Certain Syriac Christian authors viewed the Muslim Conquest as a positive development and as a part of the struggle between the eastern churches and the Chalcedonians. The Muslim Conquest also strengthened local identities, such as that of the Assyrians, through to a large extent shattering the communications between local Christians and those in the Roman Empire. Under Muslim rule, the province or region containing the ancient Assyrian heartland was called al-Jazira, meaning "the island", in reference to the land between the Euphrates and Tigris.

Christian communities were thus not thrown into total upheaval and most Christians remained where they were and did not convert. The conquering Muslims were relatively few in number and mostly kept to themselves in their own settlements. At first, the Muslim conquerors discouraged conversions to Islam as they depended on the taxes collected from Christians and Jews. Discrimination against Christians was considerably milder than discrimination against Zoroastrians given that the Muslims saw Christianity as a forerunner of their own religion; in most respects the situation of the Christians under the early Muslim rulers differed little from their status under the Sasanians. Over time however, the growth of the Church of the East declined and eventually gradually reversed due to emigrations and conversions. Because Christians were barred from converting Muslims, the decline could not be stopped. In addition to repression, additional measures were also implemented from the time of the earliest Muslim rulers to harass and humiliate Christians. For instance, Christians were not allowed to build new churches (but were allowed to conduct repairs on current ones), they had to wear a distinct turban and belt, they were forbidden to disturb Muslims by ringing church bells and praying, and they were forbidden from riding horses and carrying weapons. These measures were however only rarely enforced and could in most cases be avoided through bribery. Additionally, contacts between Christians and Muslims were probably very infrequent under the Rashidun (637–661) and succeeding Umayyad Caliphate (661–750); many Christians lived in rural communities run administratively by village headmen (dihqans) and country squires (shaharija), positions occupied by other Christians. A large number of Christians under Rashidun and Umayyad rule likely lived their entire lives without once seeing a Muslim.

There were a number of positions available largely only to Christians under the Umayyad caliphs. The Academy of Gondishapur in southern Mesopotamia, founded by Assyrians from Nisibis in the north, continued to operate and produce skilled Christian physicians under Muslim rule, many of whom were employed by the caliphs. There were also many Christians who rose to other high offices as scribes, accountants and teachers. The cultural and scientific flourishing in the Islamic Golden Age (8th to 14th century) was in large part possible through ancient Greek works previously having been copied and translated by Syriac Christian authors, which profoundly influenced science and philosophy in the Islamic world. Ancient works were copied and translated into Syriac from the 6th to 10th century, with Arabic translations (due to increasing Muslim interest) also becoming more common in the later stages of this timespan. Through the translation and copying of ancient works, the early medieval Syriac-language authors not only contributed to mainstream intellectual history, but also left a significant mark on the local Christian denominations. Among the most famous Syriac-language translators and scholars of this period were Hunayn ibn Ishaq (809–873) and Theophilus of Edessa (695–785), both of whom translated the works of ancient authors such as Aristotle and also wrote their own scholarly works.

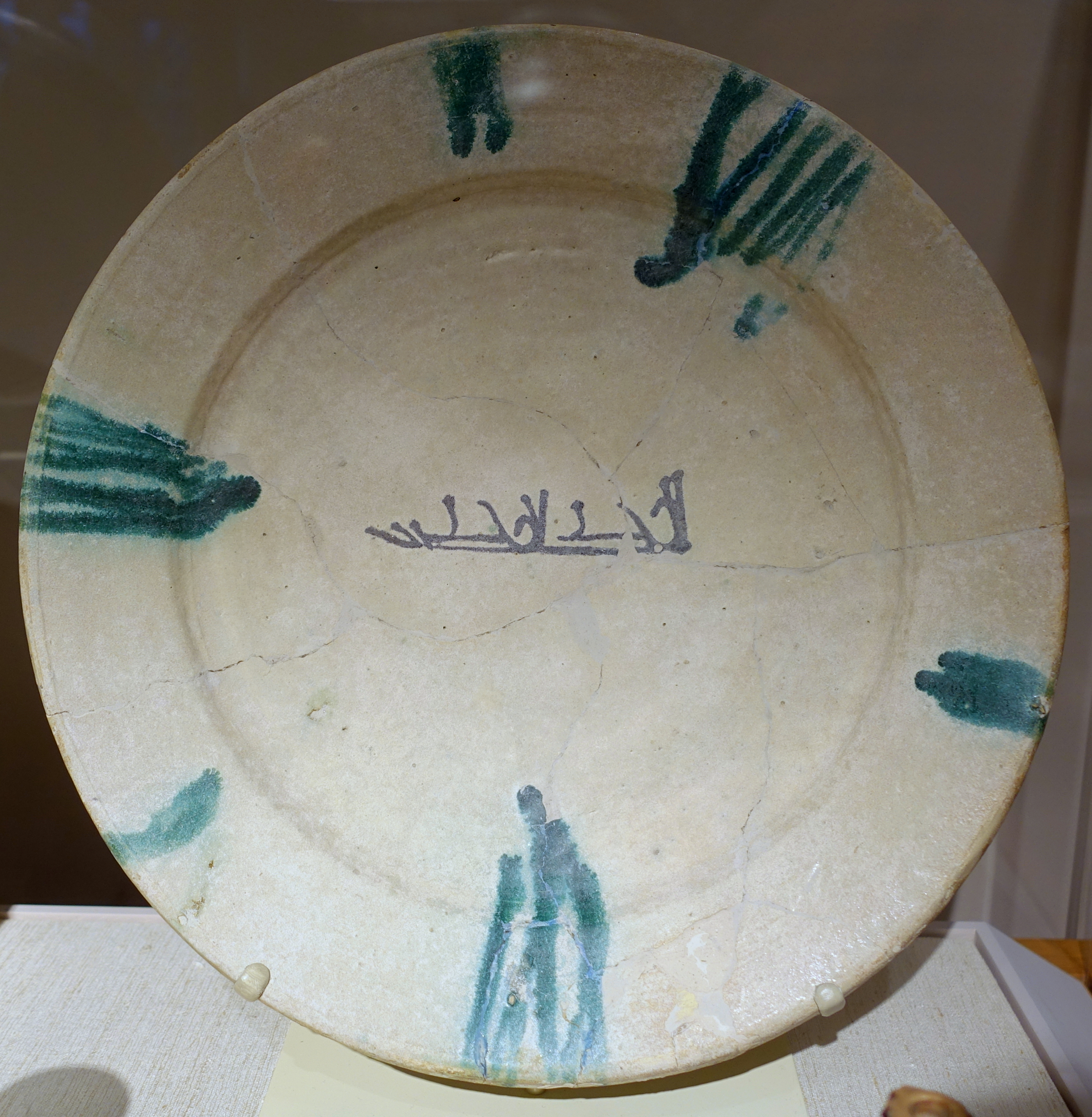
9th or 10th-century dish from Iraq or western Iran, inscribed with a Syriac language inscription

The fall of the Umayyad Caliphate and the rise of the Abbasid Caliphate in its place in 750 was viewed positively by many Christians under Muslim rule, as the Abbasids were considered to be even more positively inclined towards Christians. In terms of church affairs, the Assyrians benefitted especially much from the regime change since the Abbasids ruled from Baghdad in Mesopotamia, and the Patriarchs of the Church of the East were thus closer to the seat of power than they had been under the Umayyads (who ruled from Damascus). Their influence increased under Abbasid rule, since the patriarchs were placed on the council of state of the caliphs. Under the Abbasids, Baghdad was transformed into a great center of learning, and debates were often held among intellectuals, regardless of their religion. At the same time as this more lenient approach, pressures on Christians gradually increased due to the Abbasids wishing to spread Islam. While converting influential Christians was often approached through polite conversation, Christians of lower classes were pressured through measures such as increasing the jizya tax. Through these policies, it was chiefly under the Abbasids that the Christian churches of Mesopotamia began their long period of decline. Though there were some influential patriarchs of the Church of the East under the Abbasids, such as Timothy I (780–823), they were considerably weaker than patriarchs such as Ishoyahb III (649–659) had been under the Umayyads. In the tenth century, there was a decisive religious shift in the religion among the populations under Muslim rule; before 850, Muslims had often been an elite minority, making up on average less than 20% of the population, but after 950 they were the majority and accounted for more than 60%. Emigrations and conversions continued to happen and many of the remaining Christians banded together for safety; adherents of the Church of the East migrated from southern Mesopotamia and Persia to northern Mesopotamia, where they still remained in substantial numbers.

Under the Seljuk Empire, which conquered much of the Middle East in the 11th century, the number of Christians in Mesopotamia and elsewhere continued to fall. Under the Seljuks, conversions were motivated not only by political and economic reasons but also by fear. In the face of the Crusades, Muslim attitudes towards Christians grew more hostile. The church officials of the Church of the East meanwhile grew rich and corrupt, something admitted even by several contemporary Christian writers, and spent most of their time in squabbles against officials from rival churches, such as the Syriac Orthodox Church and the Melkite Greek Catholic Church. They continued to enjoy institutional relationships with the Abbasid caliphs, who held a mainly ceremonial role under the Seljuks.

=== Crusaders, Mongols and Timurids (1096–1552) ===
==== Literary renaissance and changes in fortune ====
The spread of the Church of the East and the Syriac language in the Middle Ages, prior to the persecutions of the late Ilkhans and Timur

In the 10th–13th centuries, Syriac-language literature experienced something of a renaissance, indicated by the production of several significant pieces of literature, including the Chronicle of Michael the Great, written by Michael the Syrian, patriarch of the Syriac Orthodox Church, as well as the theological works of Dionysius bar Salibi and Abdisho bar Berika, and the scientific writings of Bar Hebraeus. This short heyday came to an end with persecutions in the 13th and 14th centuries. Records of personal names from this time demonstrate that the names of some Assyrians continued to be connected to ancient Mesopotamia even at this late time; an Arabic-language manuscript created 1272–1275 at Rumkale, a fortress on the Euphrates, records that a son of a physician and priest named Simeon was named Nebuchadnezzar (rendered Bukthanaṣar in the Arabic text). Simeon and Nebuchadnezzar were members of a prominent ecclesiastical family which also included Philoxenus Nemrud (a name deriving from Nimrud or Nimrod), a Patriarch of the Syriac Orthodox Church.

In the 11th century, substantial populations of Armenians and Syriac Christians lived in Cilicia in southern Anatolia and in northern Syria, referenced in, among other sources, accounts written by the Crusaders of the First Crusade. For propaganda purposes, the Crusaders typically described the Christians under Turkish rule as oppressed and in need of liberation, though it is clear from surviving accounts that the views of the Armenians and Assyrians themselves were more complex. Though it was the local Greeks, Armenians and Assyrians who opened the gates to the Crusaders at the Siege of Antioch in 1098, allowing them to capture the city, many indigenous Christians also collaborated with the Turks against the Crusaders. Sources written by the Crusaders describe difficulties in distinguishing Turks from local Christians, suggesting that the two groups had somewhat assimilated with each other despite the then short period of Turkish rule. This issue several times led to persecutions and massacres directed at the Turkish inhabitants of the captured cities also strongly affecting the local Christians. It is probable that large segments of the Christian population, Assyrians and the other groups, preferred the Turks rule over the Crusaders due to the Crusaders tending to be significantly more violent than the Seljuk Turks. Also affecting perceptions of Crusaders negatively was the large crusading armies exhausting the finances and food of any region they passed through, leading to famine. Some local Christians, more knowledgeable of the area than the Crusaders, are attested as selling food to crusading forces for enormously inflated prices in times of famine, profiting at the expense of the invading armies.

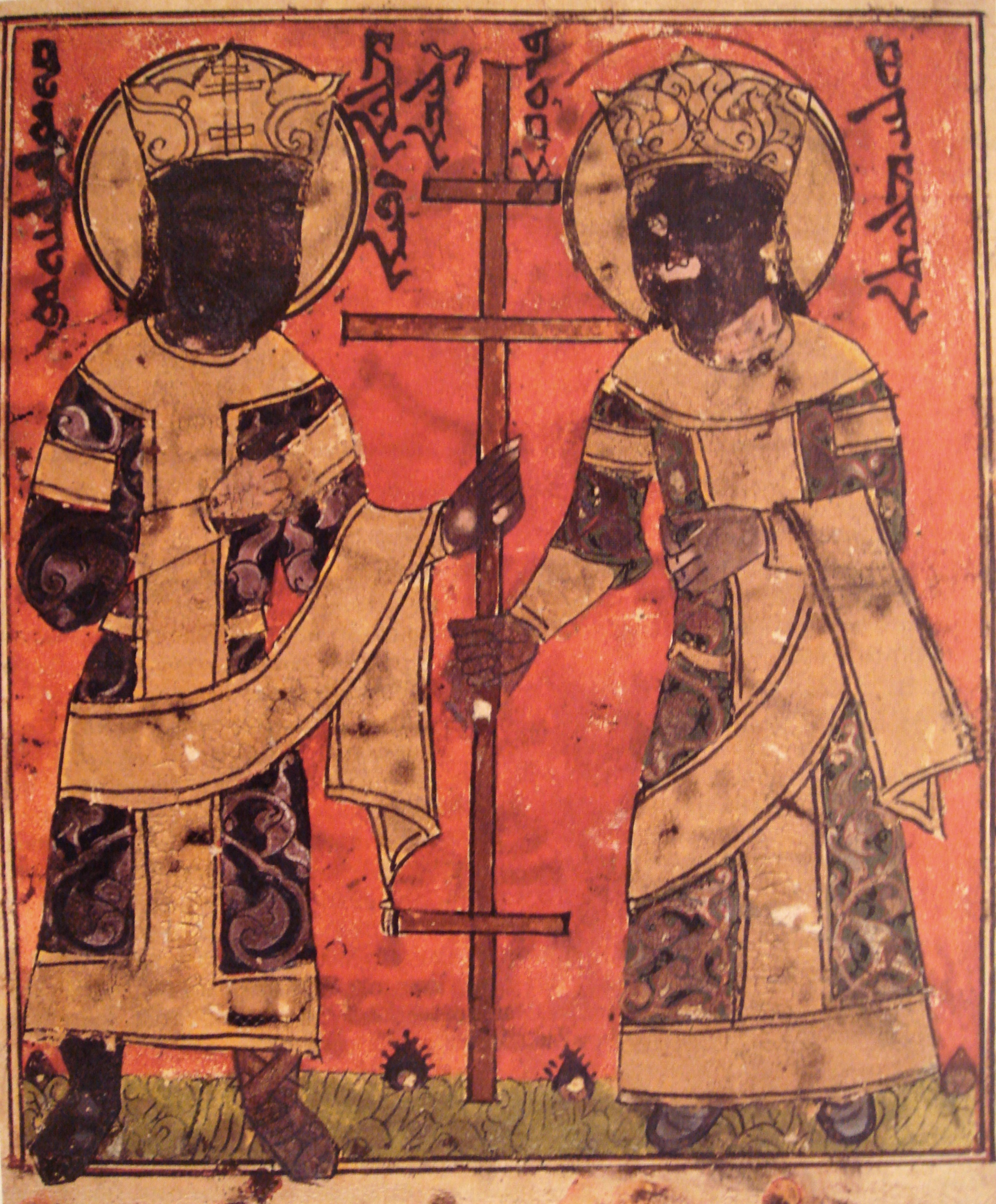
The Ilkhan Hulagu Khan and his wife Doquz Khatun depicted as the "new Constantine and Helena" in a Syriac language Bible

The Assyrians experienced their first major post-Muslim conquest change in fortune when the Mongol Empire conquered central Asia and the Middle East in the early 13th century. Though the Mongols followed tengrism and shamanism, their public policy in the vast regions they conquered was consistently to support religious freedom. Because several of the Mongol tribes that had followed Genghis Khan, the founder of the empire, were predominantly Christian and many tribal leaders had Christian wives or mothers, Christianity received special respect by the Mongol Khagans. Many among the Church of the East hoped that one of the Khagans might in time themselves convert to Christianity and declare the Mongol Empire a Christian Empire, like how Constantine the Great made the Roman Empire Christian. Hopes for a Mongol conversion to Christianity reached their zenith in the 1250s, when Hulagu Khan, ruler of the Ilkhanate (at this time the semi-autonomous Middle Eastern part of the Mongol Empire, later an independent state), drove the Seljuk Turks from Persia and Assyria, conquering cities like Baghdad and Mosul and reaching as far west as Damascus. Because many of the Mongol generals were Christians, Christians in conquered cities were often spared violence whereas Muslims were slaughtered. After his conquests, Hulagu further lifted restrictions imposed on the Christians, a move which was celebrated by the Christian population. When the Muslims retook Damascus shortly thereafter, the Christians were heavily persecuted as vengeance for their arrogance against the Muslims while the city was under Mongol rule.

==== Persecution under the Ilkhanate and Timurids ====
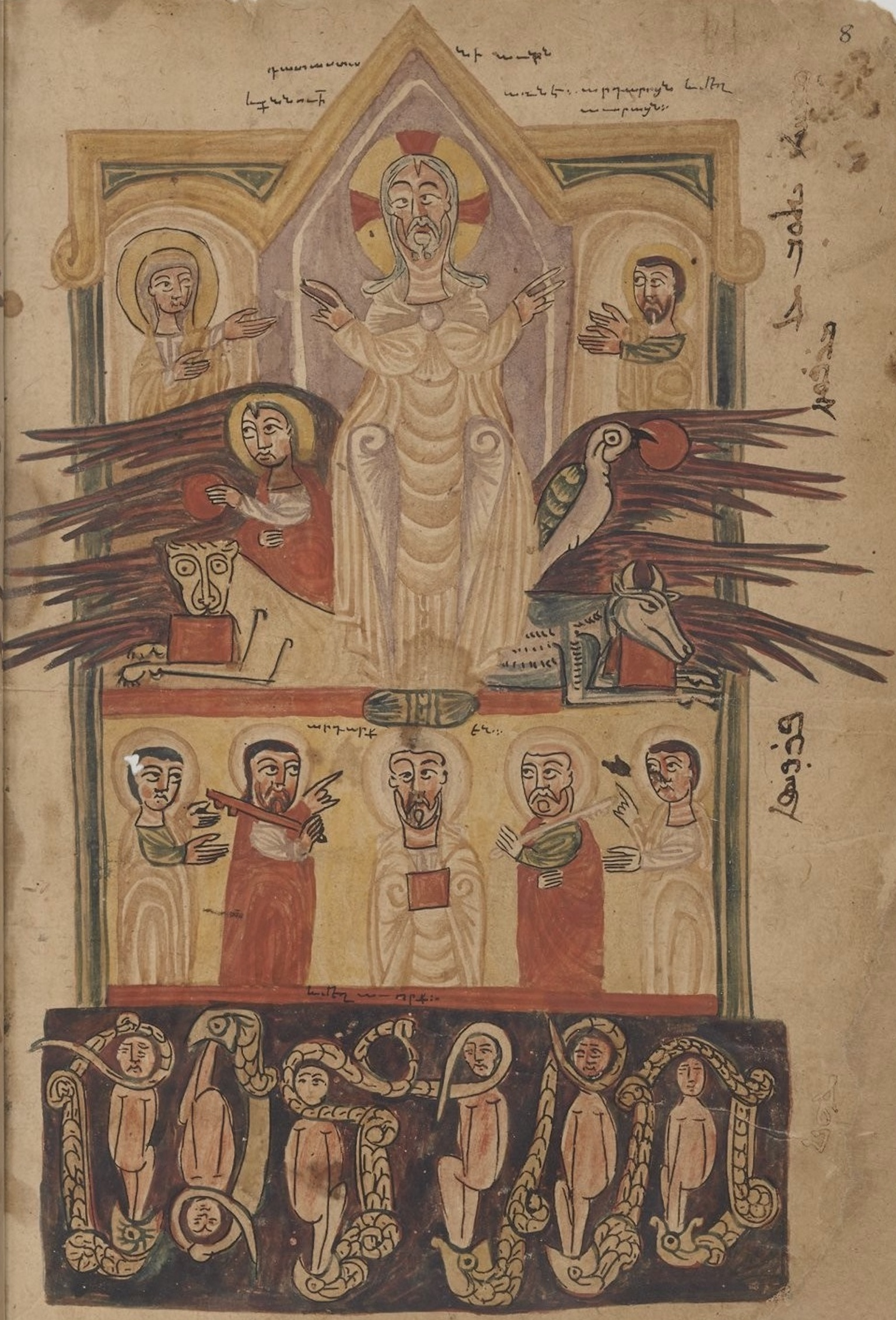
The Last Judgement, as depicted in the 16th-century Nestorian Evangelion

The period of freedom experienced by the Assyrians and other Christians came to an end when the Ilkhan Ghazan (r. 1295–1304) converted to Islam in 1295 and as one of his first acts as ruler ordered that all Buddhist temples, Jewish synagogues and Christian churches in his domain were to be destroyed. After the Muslims under his rule were inspired by the decree to direct violence towards the Christians, Ghazan intervened and somewhat reduced the severity of his decree, but some violence continued throughout his reign. The situation for the Assyrians and other Christians deteriorated even further under Ghazan's brother and successor, Öljaitü (r. 1304–1316). In 1310, the Assyrians and other Christians of Erbil (ancient Arbela) tried to escape persecution and captured the city's citadel. Despite the efforts of the Patriarch of the East, Yahballaha III, to calm the situation down, the insurrection was violently suppressed by the Kurds and the local Mongol governor, who captured the citadel on 1 July 1310 and massacred all the defenders, as well as all of the Christian inhabitants of the lower town in the city. Though the governor had been ordered not to attack the Christians, he suffered no repercussions for doing so and was hailed as a hero by the Muslims of the empire. After twenty years of persecution under Ghazan and Öljaitü, the internal structure and hierarchy of the Church of the East had been more or less destroyed and most of its church buildings were gone. The final general gathering of leaders of the church in Iran took place at a synod in 1318.

Some small communities of Assyrians thrived outside of Mongol control. In the early 14th century there was a thriving small Assyrian community in the Kingdom of Cyprus. The Assyrians of Cyprus, concentrated in Famagusta, had been relocated there from Tyre at some point after the Crusaders captured the city in 1187. Though they were few in number they were able to maintain trade connections with cities in Egypt, such as Damietta and Alexandria. Among the prominent members of this community were the metropolitan Eliya and the two traders Francis and Nicholas Lakhas. The Lakhas brothers were noted as extremely wealthy, often providing gifts to King Peter I of Cyprus and his court, though they fell into poverty after the Republic of Genoa invaded the island in 1373.

Though already violently suppressed under the late Ilkhans, the Assyrians faced their worst persecution yet after the remnants of the Ilkhanate were conquered in 1370 by the Muslim Turco-Mongol conqueror Timur, founder of the Timurid Empire. With the express goal of cleansing his domain of Christians and other "infidels," Timur oversaw the persecution and execution of an enormous number of Christians. Timur's efforts were so relentless that some among the Muslims doubted that he was Muslim at all since mercy is one of the major Muslim virtues. By the time of Timur's death in 1405, the Assyrians and other Christians of his empire had been almost exterminated, mostly due to Timur's actions but also because of factors such as famine and the Black Death. Timur's persecution campaigns are the chief reason why Christians, such as the Assyrians, still in modern times have only a minuscule presence in the Middle East. By 1410, there were only seven bishops in the Church of the East, a number down from the 24 bishops in 1238 and the 68 bishops in 1000. In effect, the persecutions reduced the once widespread church to little more than an ethno-religious group, closely tied only to the Assyrian people. In the mid-15th century, Patriarch Shemon IV made the office of patriarch hereditary, passing from uncle to nephew, a move motivated either by fearing interference in the election by Muslim authorities or by there being so few bishops left that a vote was meaningless.

== Modern history (1552–present) ==
=== Schism and Ottoman rule (1552–1843) ===
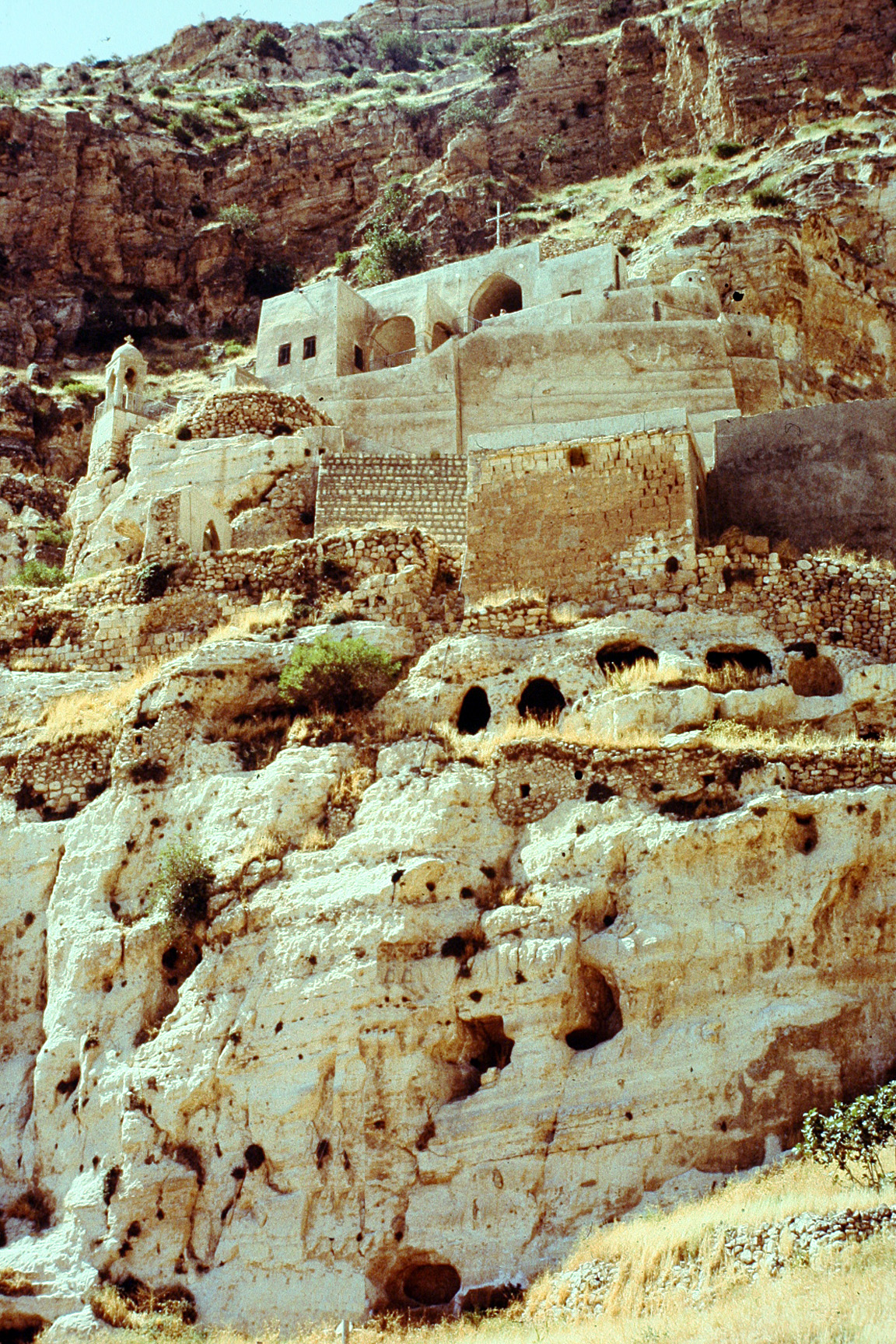
The 7th-century Rabban Hormizd Monastery in the mountains near Alqosh, historically a seat of the Patriarchs of the East and today one of the most important monasteries within the Chaldean Catholic Church

Over the centuries since the collapse of the Assyrian Empire, the populace of different parts of former Assyria diverged somewhat in culture and beliefs as they were exposed to different neighbors and cultural influences. Generally, the Assyrians in the former Assyrian heartland were often exposed to cultural influences from Iran, whereas the Assyrians in the west, often today self-identifying as Syriacs, have been exposed to cultural influences from Greece. The ancient church of the Assyrians, the Church of the East, was divided in the 16th century, when some members formed a Catholic offshoot, the Chaldean Catholic Church. The followers of this church are generally called Chaldeans, which is still the common identity among Assyrians originating from central Assyria. (Note: Though some in the Chaldean community, such as the Chaldean Patriarch Emmanuel III Delly in 2009, have in present times advocated for recognition of the Chaldeans as a separate nation and Chaldeans often associate with the ancient Babylonians in the same way modern Assyrians associate with their ancient predecessors, most Assyrians and Chaldeans today agree that they are the same ethnic group (though disagree on the terminology), a stance also taken by most non-Assyrian international organizations and foreign nations. In modern times, several Chaldean church leaders and patriarchs have maintained that "Chaldean" is a religious identity and that they are ethnically Assyrian.) The division of the Assyrian churches, often referred to as the schism of 1552, was chiefly the result of objections towards the perceived nepotism within the Church of the East. Already in 1450, Patriarch Shemon IV, already controversial for making his office hereditary, began appointing his family members to church offices. In the mid-16th century, the widely unpopular Patriarch Shemon VII Ishoyahb, who had succeeded his brother Shemon VI, appointed two of his nephews, both of whom were minors, as metropolitan bishops. Such actions were so unpopular that a gathering of bishops in 1552 refused Shemon VII's authority and elected a patriarch of their own, Shimun VIII Yohannan Sulaqa. Sulaqa quickly made his way to Rome, where he submitted to Pope Julius III and was duly recognized as the new patriarch, styled by the Pope as the "Patriarch of Mosul and Assyria". This title was centuries later (1828) changed to "Patriarch of the Chaldeans".

The Ottoman Empire captured northern Mesopotamia from Safavid Iran during the early 16th century, Mosul being conquered by Sultan Suleiman the Magnificent in 1538. One of the first notable acts by the Ottomans in regards to the Assyrians was the arrest, torture and killing of the schismatic Sulaqu in 1555, an act instigated by Shermon VII. Still opposed to Shemon, the bishops ordained under Sulaqu then elected a successor, Abdisho IV Maron, who was recognized by Pope Pius IV in 1562. When Shemon VII died, his remaining followers refused to recognize the authority of Abdisho IV and instead recognized Eliya VI, Shemon VII's nephew, as the new patriarch. The division of the Church of the East led to each branch seeking closer relation with other Christian denominations, to the detriment of the other branch. The Chaldean Catholic Church began discussions with the Roman Catholic Church in 1552/1553, but only achieved full communion in 1830. Its relationship with the other Catholic Churches has deteriorated several times, particularly when hereditary succession was introduced in that church as well in 1600, something which led to a temporary break in communion with Rome. Eliya VIII of the Assyrian Church of the East during this time attempted to exploit the fall from grace of his rival to himself establish closer relations with Rome.

The religious divide within the Assyrian community has been among their greatest hindrances in modern history. In the Ottoman Empire, the populace was organized into various ethno-religious groupings, called millets, with their own autonomy and sets of laws. Whereas some other groups, such as the Armenians, were organized into a single millet despite internal religious differences, the Ottomans separated the Süryani (Syriac Orthodox) and Keldani (Chaldean) groups into two different millets through official recognition of the Chaldeans in 1831. The followers of the Assyrian Church of the East were never officially recognized as a distinct grouping, instead placed in the Armenian millet, formally under the authority of the Catholicos of All Armenians. The Armenian church however rarely interfered in their affairs. The centuries of Ottoman rule over the Assyrians were largely peaceful before the 19th century; as long as religious and ethnic minority communities paid their taxes and acknowledged the political dominion of the Ottoman sultans they were largely free to manage their own affairs, not only religiously and culturally but also legally and economically. Despite the atrocities that would be committed by the increasingly nationalist Turkish collapsing Ottoman Empire in the 19th and 20th centuries, the early centuries of Ottoman rule thus provided opportunities for cultural flourishing and political influence. From the late 15th century onwards, Assyrian literary production increased once more, much of which was concerned with copying earlier texts for preservation purposes.

=== Struggles, persecution and genocide (1843–1919) ===
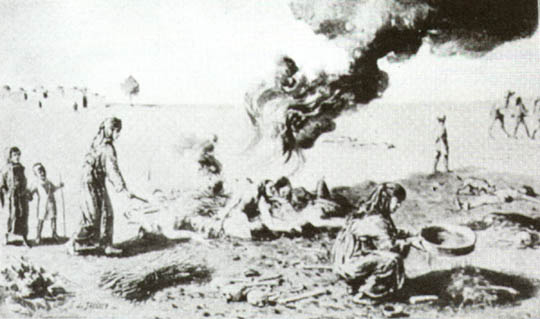
Burning of bodies of Assyrian women in 1915

Colonialism by western powers in the latter half of the 19th century led to the Assyrian people being caught between powerful colonizers on one hand and local nationalists and religious zealots on the other. Colonizations of the Assyrian homeland by the Ottoman, British and various local powers led to several massacres and deportations, particularly around the time of World War I. Most frequent and wide-ranging were persecutions by the Ottoman Empire and by various Kurdish groups. (Note: Though they inhabit much of the same lands, Assyrians and Kurds have, with some exceptions, coexisted peacefully for most of their history. Since 1843, relations have often been hostile however, owing to repeated atrocities. Kurdish hatred and distrust for the Assyrians stemmed from the many visits and promises by western missionaries to the Assyrians in the 19th century making the Kurds nervous. Some missionaries encouraged anti-Assyrian attitudes among the Kurds as it was believed that the Christian Assyrians would be more susceptible if they believed themselves to be threatened. Relations between the Assyrians and Kurds worsened further in the later 19th century, as the borders of proposed Assyrian and Kurdish states often overlapped and each group thus saw the independence movement of the other as a threat to their own efforts.) In 1843 and 1846, the Assyrians of Hakkari were massacred by the Kurdish emir of Bohtan and Hakkari, Bedir Khan Beg, and regional Ottoman forces. More than 10,000 were killed and thousands were captured. Thousands of Assyrians were also murdered in the Hamidian massacres (1894–1897) and in the Adana massacre (1909), which were otherwise mainly directed towards Armenians. In the Massacres of Diyarberkir in 1895, around 25,000 Assyrians were killed. Millennia of being an ethnic minority, combined with the many persecutions in the Middle Ages and early Modern period, reduced the number of Assyrians from as many as 20 million in ancient times to only about 500,000–600,000 people at the beginning of the 20th century.

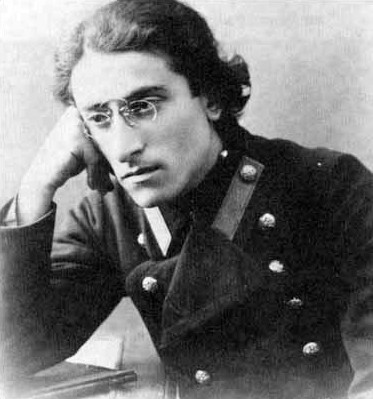
Freydun Atturaya (1891–1926), one of the founders of the Assyrian Socialist Party and a prominent advocate for Assyrian independence

Despite the suffering of the Assyrian people, the late 19th and early 20th centuries were also a time that saw major Assyrian cultural developments: the first Assyrian newspaper, Zahrirē d-Bahra ("Rays of Light") began publishing in Urmia in 1848, aided by American missionaries, and the first Assyrian political party, the Assyrian Socialist Party, was founded in 1917. The Assyrian Socialist Party prominently advocated for Assyrian independence; one of its co-founders, Freydun Atturaya, published the Urmia Manifesto of the United Free Assyria in 1917, which called for a free and united Assyria, with economic ties to Russia and stretching from Tur Abdin and Nusaybin (ancient Nisibis) to Urmia and Hakkari. Because of his Assyrian nationalist organizing, the authorities of the Soviet Union arrested Atturaya in 1924 and he was killed in 1926. He remains seen as a national hero and martyr by many Assyrians today.

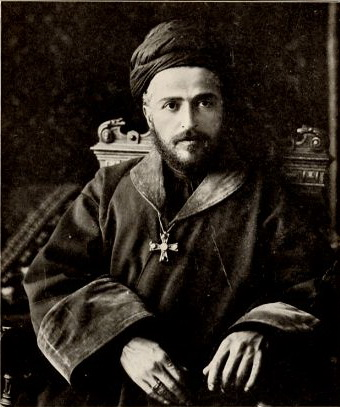
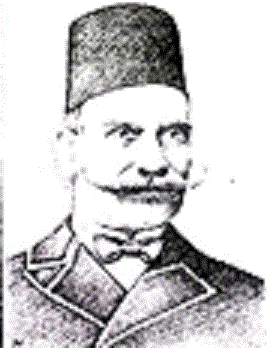
Among the most famous victims of the Sayfo, or Assyrian genocide, were the patriarch Shimun XIX Benyamin (left, killed in 1918) and the philosopher and author Ashur Yousif (right, killed in 1915)

In the Sayfo of the 1910s (mainly 1915), also known as the Assyrian genocide, part of a series of genocides imposed by the collapsing Ottoman Empire on its Christian minorities (alongside the Armenian and Greek genocides), perhaps as many as 250,000 Assyrians were killed and thousands more were forcibly converted to Islam. Among the most infamous massacres were massacres of, and atrocities towards, Armenians and Assyrians in the Diyarbekir Vilayet, overseen by the local governor Mehmed Reshid. On 10 June 1915, 400 prisoners, including several church leaders, were paraded in chains through Diyarbekir, organized by Reshid, and there was rampant beatings, torture and humiliation. Many Assyrian women testified that they had been raped or otherwise sexually abused. On 2 July 600 Assyrians were slaughtered outside the city walls. The Assyrians of Urmia in Iran refer to this time as Raqa raqa ("the Escape") due to 30,000 men, women and children fleeing from their homes in Urmia and Hakkari, travelling upwards of 600 kilometers to a refugee camp at Baqubah, near Baghdad. Almost a third of the refugees died along the way, murdered by bandits or due to exposure to the elements. Large segments of the Assyrian population in the Tur Abdin region fled across the Izla ridge into the plains surrounding Nusaybin, where many settled in what would later become the city of Qamishli in northern Syria, founded in 1926. The genocide led to an irrevocable loss in trust not only for the Turkish government, but also for the Kurdish people, who participated in the atrocities. Several Kurdish tribes assaulted and massacred Assyrian refugee caravans. On 1 July 1915, the village of Tell-Ermen, with a substantial Assyrian population, was invaded by Kurdish tribesmen. The local Assyrians sought refuge in the church, to no avail. Victims, regardless of age or gender, were decapitated, hacked to death and drawn and quartered. Afterwards, Kurdish women entered the church and stabbed any survivors to death. The bodies were disposed of by being burnt or thrown into wells.

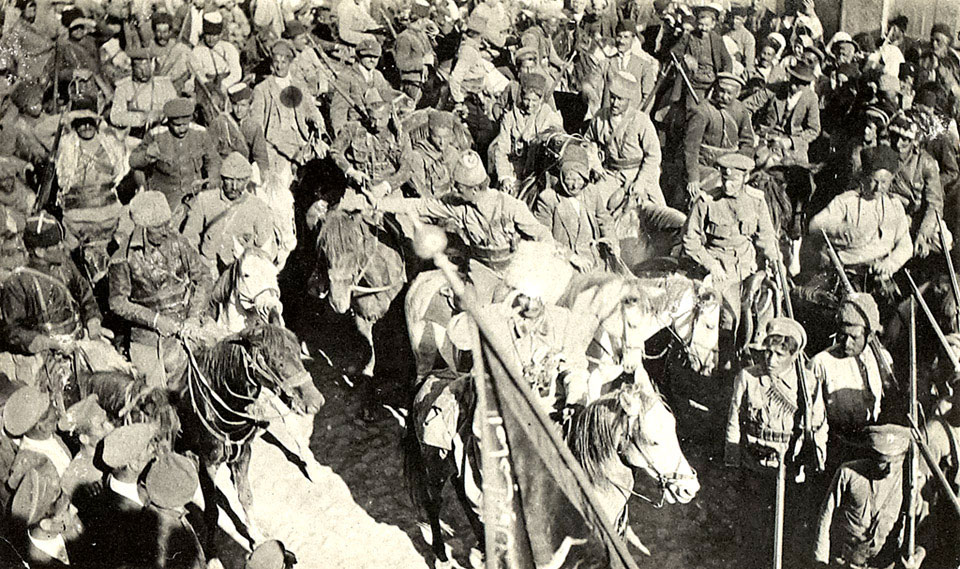
Assyrian volunteer troops in 1918, led by Agha Petros, with a captured Turkish banner

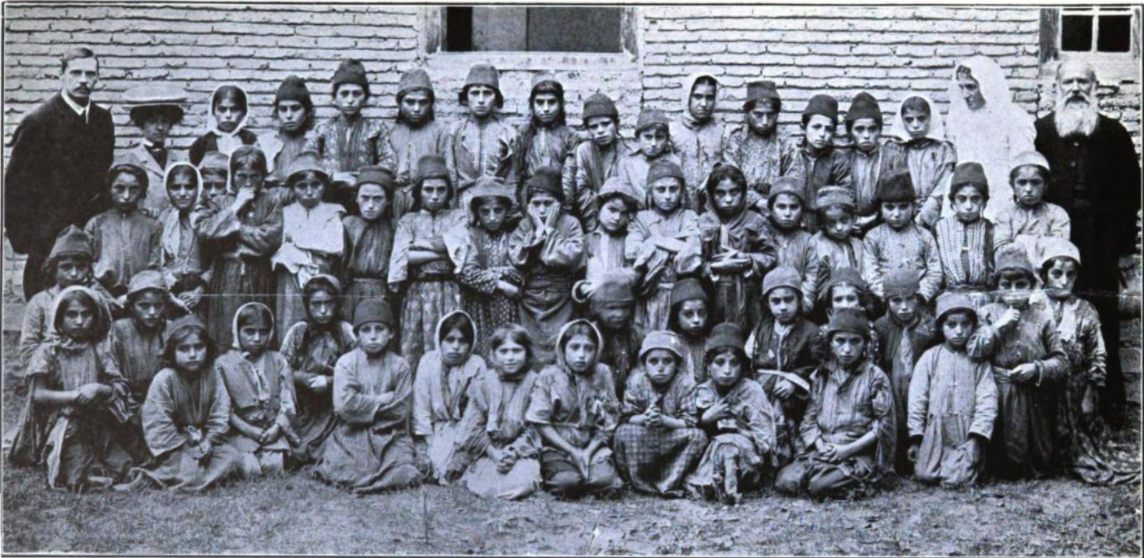
Group of Assyrian refugee girls, presumably originally from Hakkari, 1915–1918

An Assyrian independence movement took root as a result of these atrocities. In an effort to safeguard his people, Shimun XIX Benyamin, the Patriarch of the Church of the East, plead with the Allies of World War I for assistance and sought the aid of the Russian Empire. Under Shimun's spiritual leadership, the Assyrians took up arms against the Ottoman government and joined the side of the British in the war as the Assyrian volunteers. Shimun was assassinated on 3 March 1918 by the Kurdish chieftain Simko Shikak under a truce flag. The murder of Shimun did not put an end to the Assyrian defense force, which then came under the command of Agha Petros, who had been made a general by the French. Petros led the Assyrian forces for two years and dreamt of retaking abandoned Christian villages and founding an Assyrian state. Despite his charisma and dedication, Petros's conflict with the patriarchal family and the intrigues of the French and British in the region hindered him from becoming a recognized national leader and he was eventually exiled by the British to France, where he died in 1932. Other important figures of the independence movement included further military leaders who fought against the Ottomans and Kurds, such as Raphael Khan and Malik Khoshaba, as well as philosophers and authors, such as Ashur Yousif, author of the periodical Murshid Athiriyon ("Assyrian guide"), and Qasha Baba Nwiya-d-Wazirabad, founder of the independent Assyrian publication Kokhva ("The Star"). Yousif was hanged by the Ottomans alongside other intellectuals in 1915. In Iran, the press of the Zahrirē d-Bahra, which had published continuously since 1848, was destroyed in 1918. Many Assyrians fled from the Middle East entirely, with large numbers emigrating to the United States and South America. In the Assyrian diaspora, the first earnest Assyrian associations and organizations were created, including the Taw Mim Semkath (or Assyrian National School Association), founded in Stirling, New Jersey in 1899. This organization succeeded in opening an Assyrian school in Adana in 1919 to care for the orphans of the genocide, though it was forced to close in 1921 and relocated to Beirut in Lebanon.

=== Further calls for autonomy (1919–1957) ===
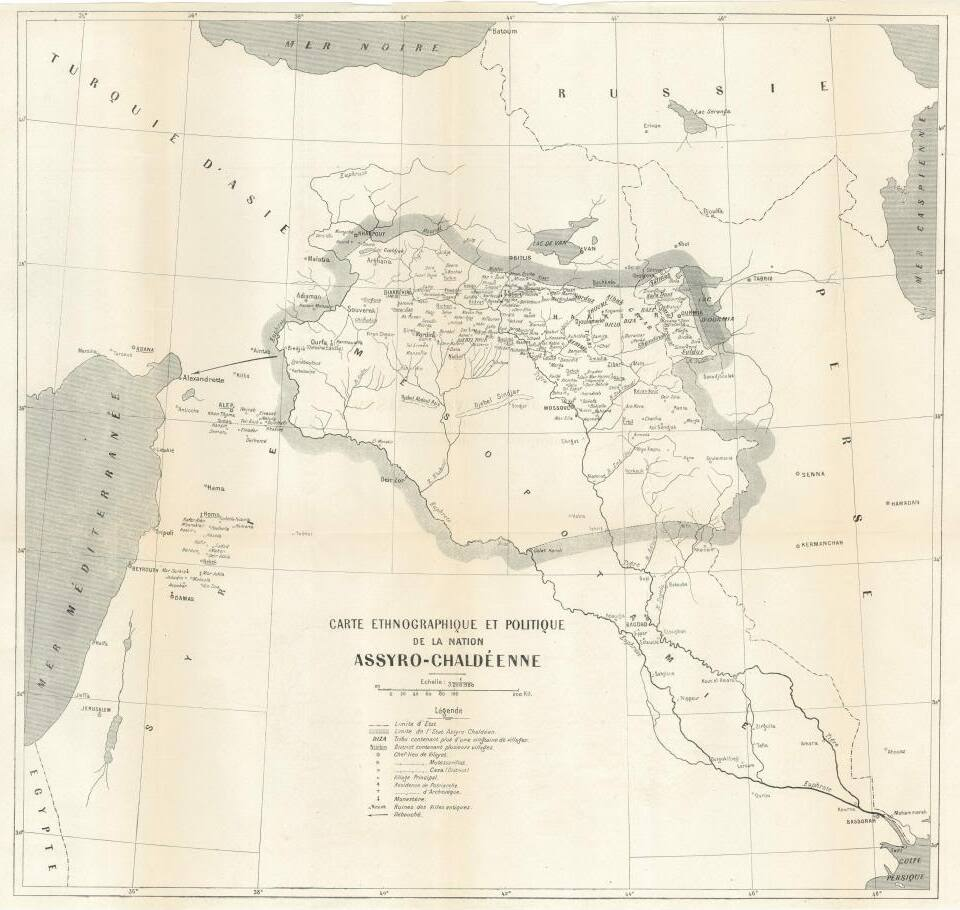
Proposed map of an independent "Assyro-Chaldea", presented by the Assyrian groups at the Paris Peace Conference in 1919.

With the collapse and breakup of the Ottoman Empire and the Qajar dynasty in Iran and the rise of new nation states in their place, many of the minorities of the Middle East began asserting their rights to self-determination and sovereignty, including the Assyrians. At the Paris Peace Conference in 1919, after World War I, an unprecedented gathering of four Assyrian groups; from Iran and the Caucasus, Iraq, the United States, and Syria, presented a manifesto and championed the creation of an independent Assyrian state. The gathering is especially noteworthy for all groups, even those who otherwise identified as Chaldeans and Syriacs, coming together to present a united front as the descendants of "the ancient Assyrian nation", a term used by Ignatius Aphrem I of the Syriac Orthodox Church. The manifesto, later published under the title The Claims of the Assyrians as Presented to the Paris Peace Conference of 1919, defined the Assyrian people as being constituted by the "Nestorians", Chaldeans, Syriacs, Maronites, Persian Assyrians, Russian Assyrians and "Muslim Assyrians" (a group in which the delegation included the Yazidis and Shekaks). Due to the opposition of Great Britain, despite many British officials previously having promised support to the Assyrian volunteers in creating an Assyrian state, the Assyrians were left out of the treaties that divided the Ottoman Empire, with only a small mention being made of the need to "protect the Assyro-Chaldeans and other ethnic and religious minorities in the region". Though little came of their efforts on a geopolitical level, the delegation ensured that new lines of communication developed between the otherwise rival groups, long divided by religion and political borders.

After the establishment of British and French colonial rule in the Ottoman Empire's old lands in the Syria and Iraq, many Assyrians were enlisted by the British as soldiers in local colonial militias, perhaps a reason for later anti-Assyrian sentiment in the region. This anti-Assyrian sentiment was somewhat misguided as the British also enlisted large units of Arabs and Kurds. In 1921, Faisal I was granted a ruling hand of Mandatory Iraq as its king. Under the British mandate, the Assyrians significantly grew in number in northern Mesopotamia again. Though often barred from formal military and political service by the Iraqi authorities, there were many prominent politically active Assyrians. Piotr Vasili, an Assyrian born in Georgia, became the father of communism in Iraq as the mentor of Yusuf Salman Yusuf, also an Assyrian, who served as the first secretary of the Iraqi Communist Party. The Iraqi Communist Party has historically been popular among Assyrians owing to its opposition to the Iraqi government. Assyrian calls for independence and autonomy continued through the later 20th century. In 1932, Patriarch Shimun XXIII Eshai and other prominent Assyrians sent a petition to Great Britain and the League of Nations to recognize the Assyrians as a nation that has constantly lived in Iraq, not only a religious minority, and to work for further Assyrian autonomy. Just one year after Iraq became fully independent from the British, the military and local tribesmen in August 1933 carried out the Simele massacre which targeted Assyrian villages. Assyrian estimates place the death toll as high as 3,000 victims. August 7, which saw the most bloodshed, is still commemorated as the "Day of the Assyrian Martyrs".

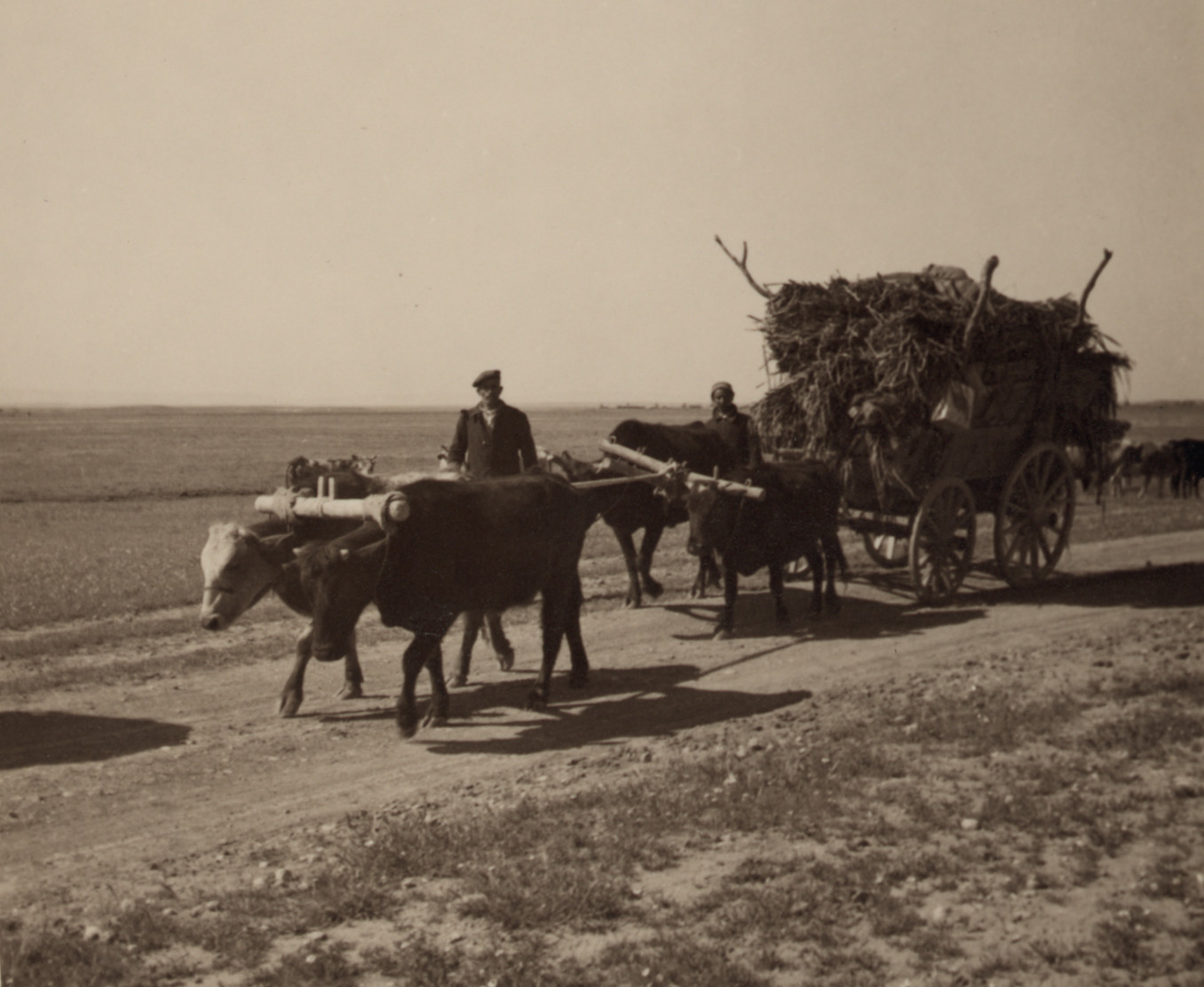
Assyrian refugees in the steppe between the Tigris and Euphrates in 1939

In the wake of the Simele massacre, the League of Nations proposed an Assyrian settlement in 1935, though little came of it. In 1945, Shimun XXIII submitted the Assyrian National Petition to the newly established United Nations, urging the creation of an Assyrian state. Three years later in 1948, Shimun XXIII however urged the Assyrian people to reconcile with the Iraqi authorities and live as "loyal citizens", hoping that the Assyrians might eventually achieve autonomy instead of outright independence. It was in the aftermath of the Simele massacre and the previous atrocities committed against the Assyrian people that the distinct Assyrian church communities (i.e. the Syriacs and Chaldeans) began to truly advocate for separate identities; though not distinct ethnic groups in the normal sense, differences in customs and religious beliefs had by this point become palpable. This development probably coincided with the foundation of the secular Assyrian Democratic Organization in Syria in 1957.

=== Contemporary Assyria (1957–present) ===
==== Political and cultural movements ====
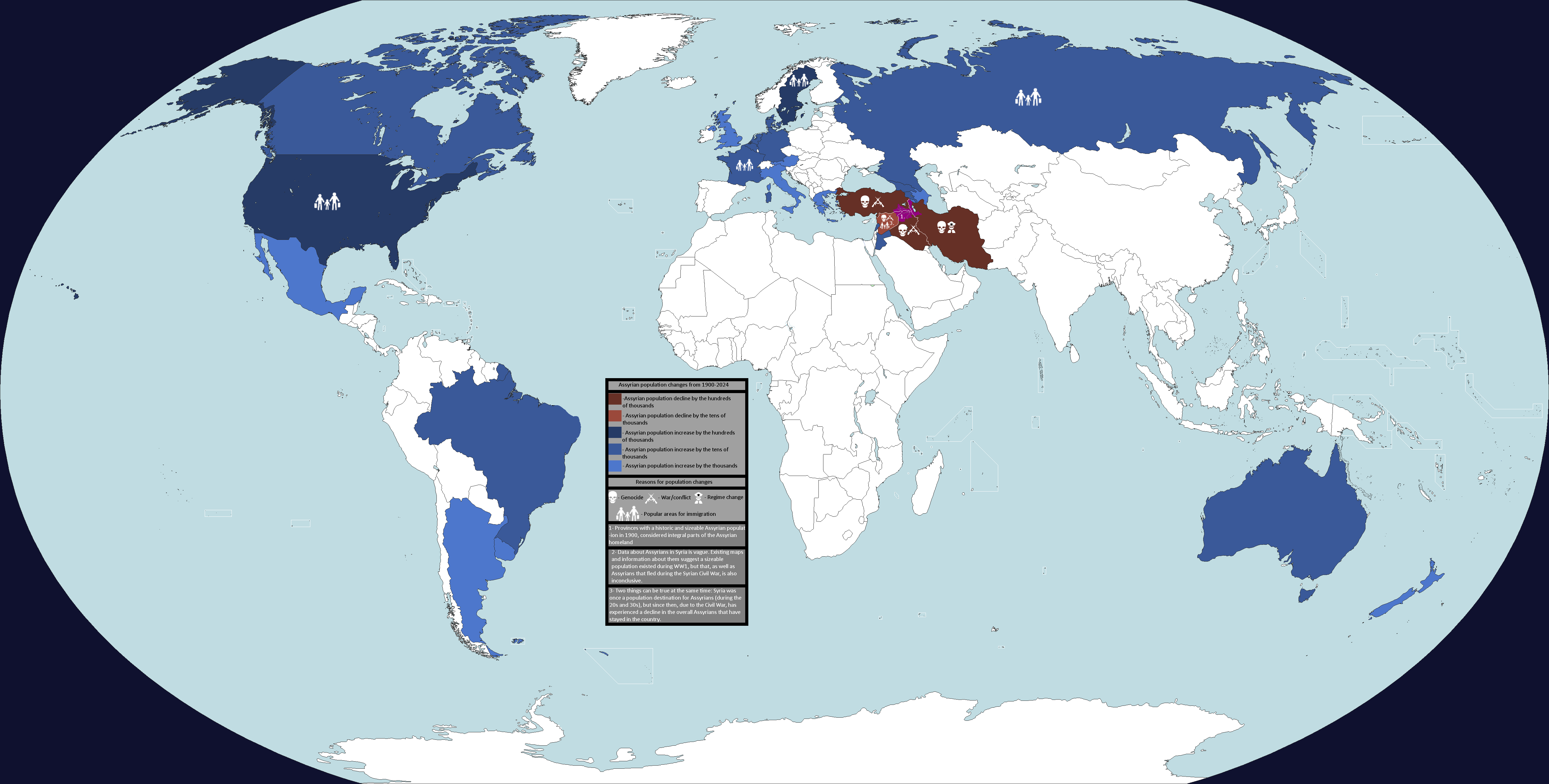
The Assyrian people, due to genocide experienced in Turkey, Syria and Iran, were drastically reduced in numbers. Later on, many events (civil wars in Iraq/Syria, the Turkish/Kurdish Conflict, the Iranian Revolution and the emergence of ISIS) all played a role in reducing Assyrian presence in the Middle East. Today, more Assyrians live in the diaspora rather than in the historic Assyrian homeland.

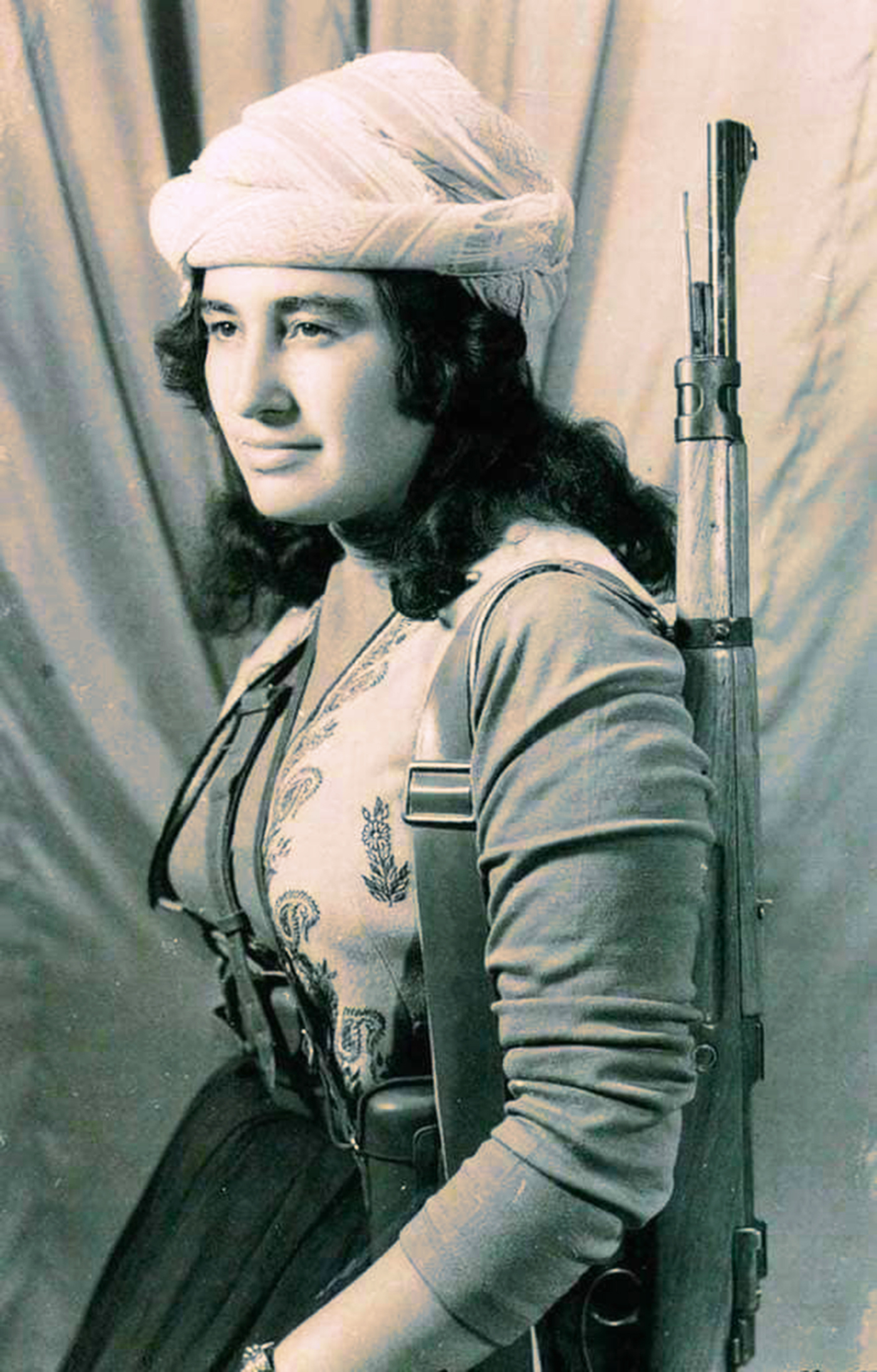
Margaret George Shello (1942–1969), an iconic Assyrian guerilla fighter and military leader of the Kurdish Peshmerga forces in Iraq

In the aftermath of the continued division of the Assyrian community, contributed to by both internal and external factors, many of the remaining Assyrians in Turkey and elsewhere became politically involved in left-wing movements, though they were mostly consumed by the more numerous and powerful Kurdish political movements, such as the Kurdistan Workers' Party. Due to continued Turkish annexation of Assyrian villages and imposing of Turkish names for them, many Assyrians fled Turkey, emigrating to countries such as Sweden, Germany, Austria and Switzerland. In Iran, Assyrians continued to remain as a small, albeit influential, minority until the Iranian Revolution of 1979, when many fled the country. Among the Assyrian developments in Iran prior to 1979 were the foundation in Tehran of the Assyrian Youth Cultural Society on 21 February 1950, an organization that formed the basis of the later Assyrian Universal Alliance, founded in France in 1968. After the Iranian Revolution, new religious pressures were imposed by the government, which among other things led to Assyrian schools being forced to change to using Iranian names.

Even after the Simele massacre the Iraqi government continued to impose policies in an effort to curb Assyrian culture. In the 1960s, 70 towns and villages in northern Iraq were destroyed, many were forcibly abandoned and more than 76 sites of religious or cultural significance were destroyed. In the "border clearings" of 1974–1978, many northern villages were destroyed, with thousands of families relocated in a forced urbanization campaign. In the Anfal campaign, primarily a massacre of the Kurds, the Iraqi government killed around 2,000 Assyrians and destroyed over fifty historical and cultural sites. Though the population of Assyrians in Iraq had risen to as many as over 1 million since the Sayfo, estimates suggest that it again fell to 300,000–400,000 between 1961 and 1991 as the result of mass emigrations. The Assyrians were not idle in the face of continued measures against them. Some, such as Margaret George Shello, joined the Kurdish cause against the Iraqi government, despite the historically poor relations between the two groups. Shello joined the Peshmerga in 1963, at the age of 20, as the organization's first female fighter and commanded the Kurdish forces at the Battle of Zawita Valley before her death in 1969, most likely assassinated by the Iraqi government or by a rival Kurdish faction. Since her death, Shello has become an icon among the female warriors of the Peshmerga.

Assyrian flags adopted in the 20th century: flag used by the Assyrian delegation at the Paris Peace Conference in 1919 (left) and the most common modern flag, designed in 1968 and nearly universally adopted in 1971 (right).

The Iraqi government considered the sudden political unity between many of the Assyrians and Kurds to be a threat and made many unsuccessful attempts to divide the groups. In 1973, President Ahmed Hassan al-Bakr invited the Assyrian political leader Yaku Malek Ismael and Patriarch Shimun XXIII and offered to grant the Assyrians additional rights in return for funding Assyrian military units to attack the Kurds; Ismael and Shimun refused the offer. Assyrians in Iraq during this time also funded books and magazines (including the magazine Mordinna Atouraya, published in both Assyrian and Aramaic) and founded numerous organizations, such as Assyrian Unity and Freedom, the Assyrian Cultural Club and the Assyrian Sports Club. Other Assyrians became politically active and championed the cause for Assyrian autonomy. In the 1960s and 1970s, Hurmiz Malik Chikko led an unsuccessful struggle for autonomy. The most prominent Assyrian political party in Iraq, the Assyrian Democratic Movement (ADM), was founded in 1979. The ADM was established chiefly in response to the Iraqi government in its 1977 census refusing to acknowledge the existence of the Assyrian people, forcing Assyrians to register as either Arabs or Kurds.

Though some continued hostility between Assyrians and Kurds have been recorded since the late 20th century, the Assyrians have prominently participated in the political scene of the autonomous Kurdistan Region in Iraq since its autonomy in 1992. Assyrian political parties partook in the first 1992 Kurdistan Region parliamentary election, wherein some seats had been reserved for the Assyrian community. In the face of such collaboration, the Iraqi government changed tactics from persuasion to intimidation, pressuring Assyrian political leaders. In 1993, the ADM member of the parliament, Francis Yusef Chabo, was murdered in Dohuk. Though the position of the Assyrians in the rest of Iraq has mostly deteriorated, and despite their historical enmity, the Assyrians in the Kurdistan Region have mostly flourished, with their political, cultural and educational rights guaranteed. Since 1991, they have been able to publish newspapers and broadcast television in their own language; more than 30 Assyrian language schools have been created with government funding and more than 20 churches have been renovated and restored.

==== 21st century ====
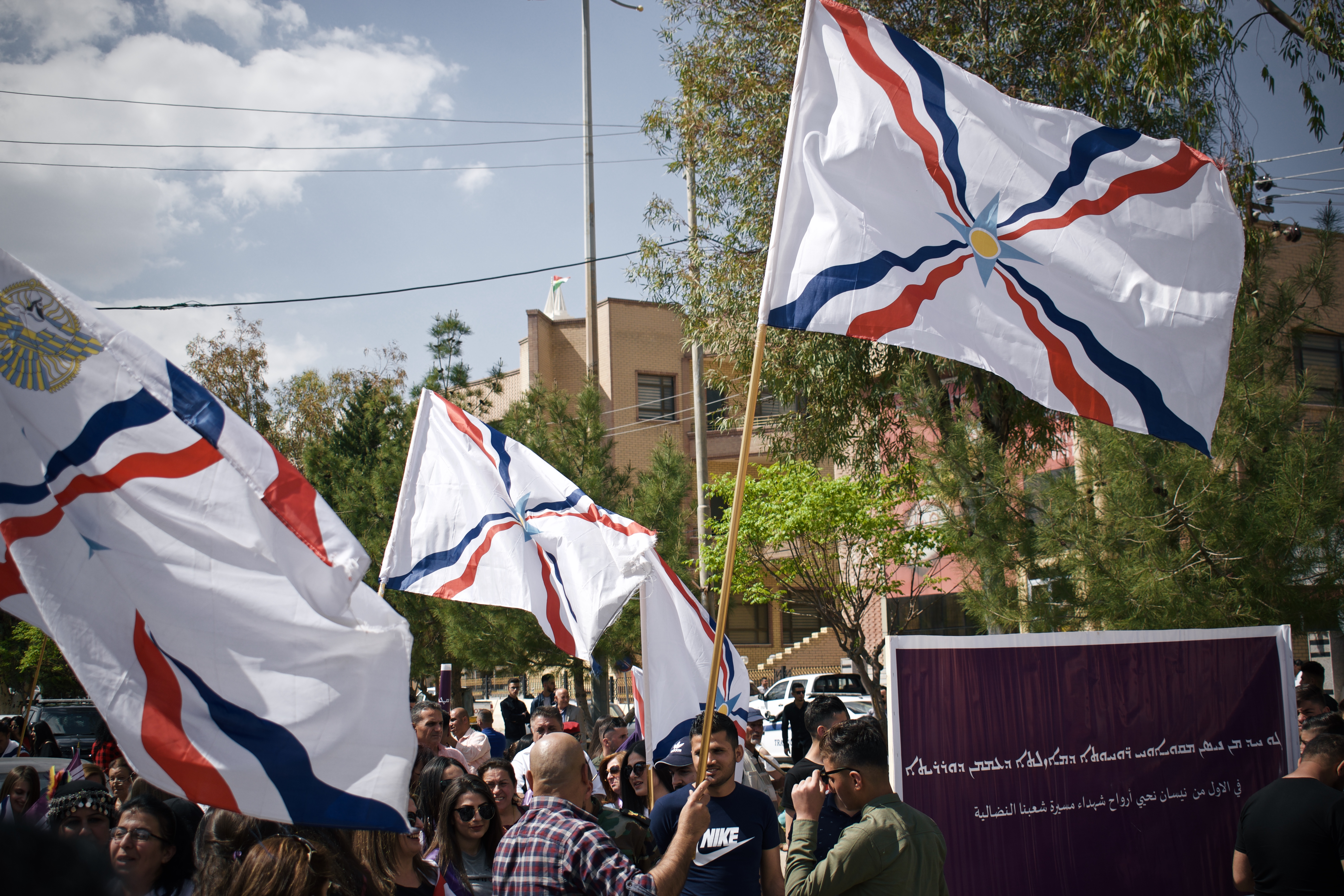
Assyrians celebrating Akitu in Duhok, 2018

Today, the Assyrians mostly live in diaspora and continue to be divided into rival political factions and Christian denominations. In modern times there have been several unsuccessful efforts to reunify the Assyrian people under one common identity. In 22–24 October 2003, religious leaders of the various communities, politicians and civic club members met at the Ishtar Hotel in Baghdad in an effort to settle on a unified nomenclature. Among others presided over by Yonadam Kanna, secretary general of the ADM, the meeting settled on referring to the people as "Chaldo-Assyrian" and the language as "Syriac". Though the term "Chaldo-Assyrian" met with some initial acknowledgement, it also received much backlash, especially in the diaspora. Though some disagreement exists within the Chaldean community, both Assyrians and Chaldeans have for the most part agreed that it is an indisputable fact that they are the same people. Each side however retains its own opinion on what "same people" actually means. An uncontroversial unifying term sometimes used in certain contexts is the Arabic designation Masīḥī (meaning Christian). Some organizations use "Assyrian-Chaldean-Syriac". At the same time as efforts to unify the Assyrians failed, the Assyrians in Turkey experienced a resurgence as families formerly emigrated to France began to return to the region around Tur Abdin and Bohtan and rebuild. Though opposed by the Turkish government and local Kurdish groups, the local Assyrians continue to operate the major monasteries in the region, including the Mor Hananyo Monastery and the Mor Gabriel Monastery.

To counterweight the Kurdish political power in northern Iraq, some Assyrians advocating for autonomy have favored closer relations and unity with the other minorities of the region: the Yazidis and Iraqi Turkmen. Some Assyrians and Yazidis have advocated the idea that they are the same people, separated only by religion and culture, and have championed the inclusion of the Yazidis in the "Assyrian nation". In 2004, the Assyrian activist Hanna Hajjar championed the idea that an independent Assyria could be built together with the Turkmen as equal partners.

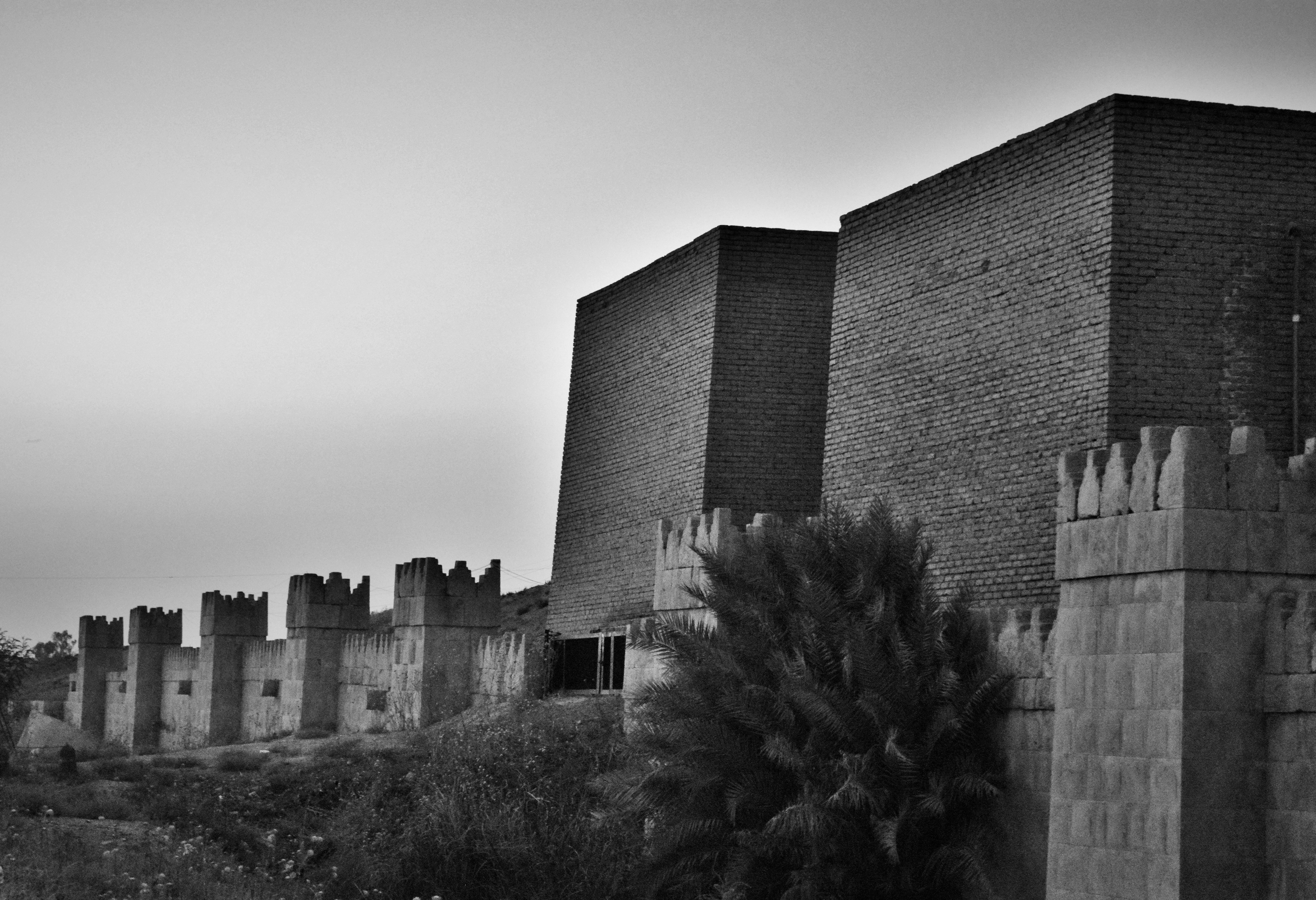
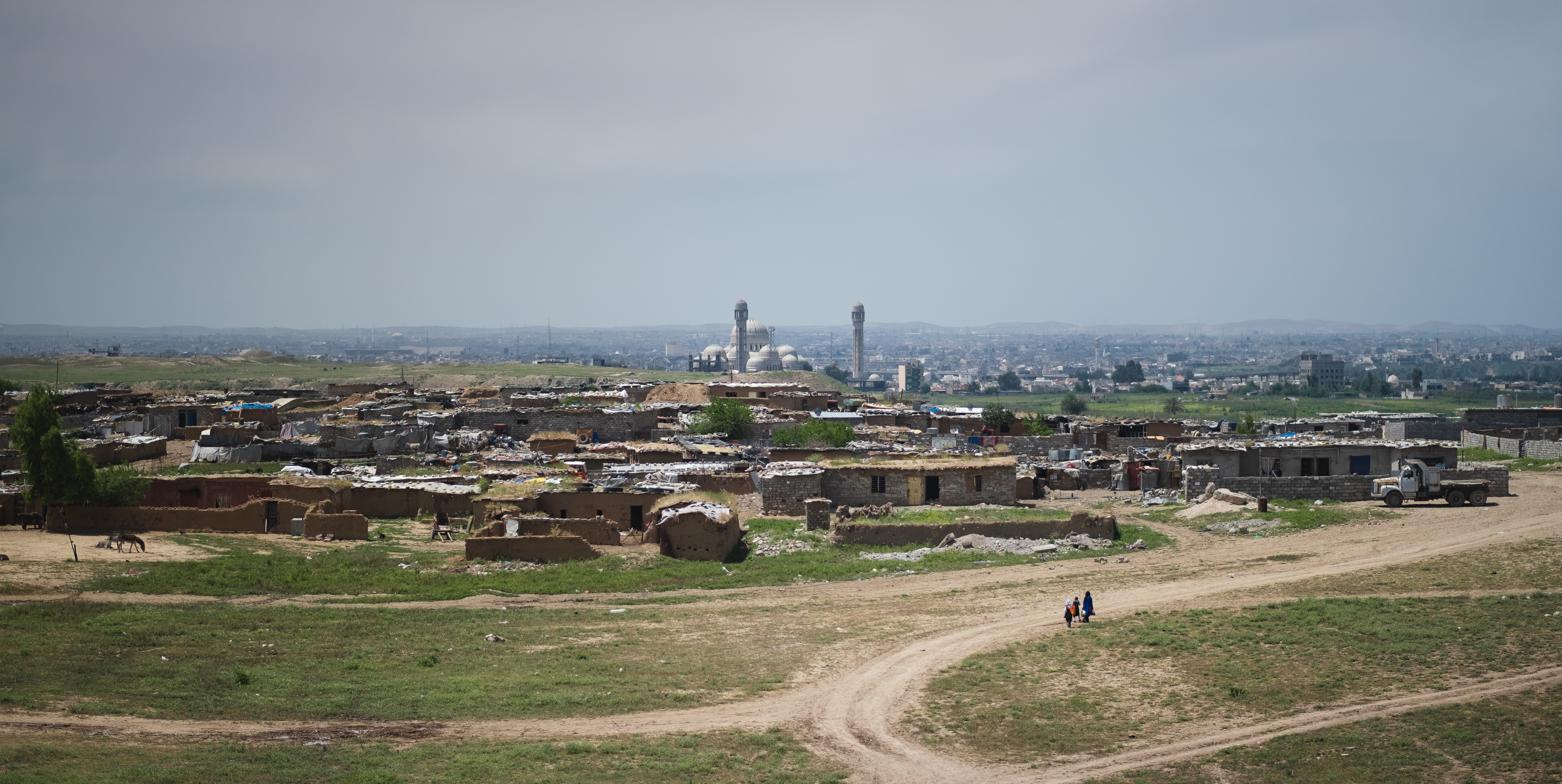
Among numerous other sites of historical and cultural value, ancient Assyrian ruins, such as those of Nineveh, suffered extensive destruction of cultural heritage by the Islamic State. Among the other prominent structures of the site, the Mashki Gate (left) was destroyed in 2016. The current destroyed archaeological site (right) is mostly occupied by squatters.

The Assyrians suffered persecution and genocide again in the power vacuum left in the aftermath of the Iraq War, as the Islamic State (ISIL) terrorist group swept over northern Iraq in 2014. ISIL commenced a campaign of ethnic cleansing and genocide of Christian minorities. After the Fall of Mosul in June 2014, the Christian inhabitants of the city were given the choice of leaving, converting or being killed. On 23 February 2015, ISIL fighters combed the region along the Khabur river in north-eastern Syria, imprisoning locals, destroying shrines, churches and monasteries and plundering and razing villages. In total, about 300 people were kidnapped and 3,000 were displaced. Many Assyrians were also executed during the time of ISIL control. ISIL threatened not only the lives of the Assyrian people but also their cultural heritage. Also in February 2015, claiming the ancient Mesopotamian artefacts and ruins represented "elements of idolatry from the age of ignorance", ISIL destroyed hundreds of ancient artefacts from Mosul and bulldozed large portions of the ruins of the ancient cities of Nimrud, Dur-Sharrukin, Hatra and Assur.

Though northern Mesopotamia was liberated from ISIL control in 2017–2019, the future of the Assyrian people and their ancient homeland remains uncertain. Large Assyrian communities still live in the region, most prominently in Qamishli, along the Khabur river, in the Nineveh Plains and in Aleppo, which received an influx of Assyrian refugees during World War I. Though several Assyrian military units were formed in response to the ISIL incursion, including the Khabour Guards, Sootoro and the Nineveh Plain Protection Units, they remain smaller than many other units in the region, such as the mainly-Kurdish People's Defense Units (YPG) and Peshmerga. The conflicts also led to tensions within the Assyrian community, as armed groups like the Khabour Guards and Nattoreh occasionally clashed with pro-YPG Assyrians like the Syriac Military Council. Despite these issues, local Assyrian self-defense groups were able to assert some limited self-governance; for instance, the Assyrian Democratic Party made a deal in 2017 which led to the withdrawal of the YPG from the Khabur valley, with it passing under control of the Khabour Guards and Nattoreh. Due to its central position in the Middle East, the Assyrian homeland and its remaining Assyrian population are threatened in the event of renewed intense conflict in the region. Among the diaspora, the continued persecutions and atrocities committed against the Assyrians that still live in the Assyrian homeland have led to fears that they will never be able to return, which has made "permanent emigration" a key part of their identity.

Despite the turmoil of the last 20 years, however, there are growing hopes in the Assyrian diaspora of a return to the Assyrian homeland, with slow moves back choosing to settle in Ankawa to preserve Assyrian identity and heritage.

== See also ==
- Assyrian cuisine
- Assyrian culture
- Assyrian homeland
- Assyrian music
- Assyrian struggle for independence
- History of Syriac Christianity
- List of Assyrians
- Name of Syria
- Names of Syriac Christians
