= Farid Nuzha =

Assyrian nationalist and journalist

Farid Elias Nuzha
- ܦܪܝܕ ܐܠܝܐܣ ܢܙܗܝ
- Photograph of Nuzha, taken at an undisclosed date
- Born: 1895; Hama, Ottoman Syria
- Died: 1971 (unconfirmed); Argentina
- Occupation: Journalist
- Movement: Assyrian nationalism

Farid Elias Nuzha (Syriac: ܦܪܝܕ ܐܠܝܐܣ ܢܙܗܝ, pronounced [fɑriːd nɑzhe]; 1895 - 1971), also spelled Farid Nazha or Farid Nozha, was an Assyrian nationalist and journalist. Born in Hama to a Syriac Orthodox family in 1895, he immigrated to Argentina due to religious conflicts in his hometown. While in Argentina, he helped establish a cultural club and a newspaper, Syriac University/Assyrian Association, which he subsequently wrote for throughout most of his life and career.

In his writings, Nuzha advocated for the preservation and promotion of Assyrian culture, identity and language. He also maintained a stance on unity within the Assyrian community and emphasized bringing together members of the various Syriac churches. Nuzha opposed the mixing of ethnic identity with religious affiliation and pushed forward an inclusive Assyrian belonging through his community advocacy. He also frequently criticized the clergymen of the Syriac Orthodox Church. Most notably, his criticism of and conflict with Ignatius Aphrem I Barsoum led to his excommunication from the church, though it was later reversed.

Nuzha's writings through the Assyrian Association magazine would serve as an inspiration for Assyrian nationalists in the 1950s, including the formation of the Assyrian Democratic Organization in Syria. Today, he is remembered for his contributions to both Assyrian nationalism as well as Assyrian journalism, and is celebrated alongside other figures such as Naum Faiq and Freydun Atturaya.

== Early life ==
Farid Elias Nuzha was born in 1895 in Hama, Ottoman Syria to a Syriac Orthodox family. His grandparents were immigrants originally from Elazığ (Harpoot) in Turkey who migrated to Hama in 1760. The name "Nuzha" descends from a great-grandmother who had the same name, while his middle name "Elias" came from his father's name. Nuzha would be educated in the Syriac Orthodox education system that was established by the church in the 1840s.

In 1911, a number of Syriac Orthodox Assyrians converted to the Syriac Catholic Church, which initiated a bitter conflict in Hama's Assyrian community. Nuzha's father decided to send him to Argentina, in order to prevent him from becoming involved in the conflict. In August of that year, he arrived in Buenos Aires, where he studied Mathematics and Economy. In March 1920, he married an Argentine woman of Italian descent and moved to Santiago del Estero for work; he returned to Buenos Aires eleven years later. During the last 9 years of this period, Nuzha received no new information on the developments of the Assyrian community abroad.

== Journalistic work and activism ==
Influenced by Naum Faiq's writings, Nuzha co-founded a cultural club, the "Assyrian Ephremic Center" (Spanish: Centro Afrémico Asirio) in 1934. Nazha would co-found another organization, "Assyrian Unity" with Abrohom Gabriel Zsaumo, which lasted from 1943 to 1959.

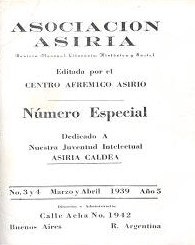
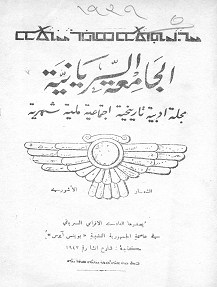
1939 facsimiles of Asociación Asiria in Spanish, Syriac and Arabic.

The Assyrian Emphremic Center published a newspaper, Syriac University/Assyrian Association, (Note: In Syriac, ܚܕܢܝܘܬܐ ܣܘܪܝܝܬܐ, (Ḥdonoyutho Suryoyṯo). In Arabic, الجامعة السريانية (al-Jam‘īah as-Siryanīyah). In Spanish, Asociación Asiria. Nuzha used "Assyrian" and the endonym "Suryoye" synonymously.) which ran from September 1934 until 1959. (Note: Sargon Donabed and Shamiran Mako state that the magazine ran until 1959,, whereas Aprem Shapera and the Assyrische Mesopotamische Vereniging Enschede state that it ran until Nuzha's passing. Gabriele Younan adds that the magazine was republished briefly in 1969.) The newspaper was initially aimed towards Assyrian/Syriac immigrants in Argentina, but its popularity grew as Assyrian journalists from other parts of the world started to contribute to it. The magazine would later incorporate a correspondent, Yusuf Namek (originally from Urfa), who wrote under the pen-name "Bar-Ashur" (Syriac: ܒܪ ܐܫܘܪ, lit. 'Son of Assyria'), although many of his writings would later be altered to replace "Assyrian" with "Aramean" in the Middle East. The magazine would arrive in Syria from overseas, and partly serve as inspiration for the establishment of the Assyrian Democratic Organization in the 1950s.

Nuzha himself had a column in Assyrian Association, where he commented on various matters concerning the Assyrian populace during this time. In his writings, he maintained an inclusive approach to denominational names used among the different Syriac churches and sought unity between them, while opposing the mixing of religious affiliation with ethnic identity. Additionally, Nuzha advocated for the preservation of colloquial Assyrian-Aramaic (Sureth/Surayt), and believed that poor communication among the laymen was due to the existence of multiple dialects. He also criticized those who neglected to learn Assyrian-Aramaic in favor of other languages, including those who believed that it should remain a liturgical language. Nozha wrote in both Arabic and Syriac; he wrote in Arabic in order for his messaging to get across to those who couldn't speak Syriac, which he mastered.

=== Conflict with the Syriac Orthodox Church ===
In 1939, Nuzha wrote an article in response to a Syriac Orthodox writer from Mosul in Iraq. (Note: According to a correspondent interview with Naures Atto, the person who wrote the letter to Nuzha was Ne'mat-Allah Danno. Journalist Augin Kurt Haninke was confirmed the same information.) The writer urged Nuzha to remove "Assyrian" from the Spanish name of his magazine because of Iraqi government distaste for the name, and because of Nuzha's affiliation with the Syriac church. Nuzha was displeased and strongly rejected the request. In his response to the writer, Nuzha accused them of ignorance for equating Assyrian identity with the Nestorian misnomer, and stated that the word "Suryani" was equivalent and originated from the word "Assyrian".

Nuzha frequently clashed with Syriac Orthodox Patriarch Ignatius Aphrem I (Aphrem Barsoum), as a divide was growing between secularists and clergy after the Simele massacre. In this period, Barsoum began a campaign of removing the Assyrian label from institutions affiliated with the SOC, combined with a push for a "Syrian" designation. Both Barsoum and Nuzha had previously had a cordial friendship, and communicated with each other until 1921; additionally, when Barsoum ascended to the position of Patriarch, Nuzha sent him a letter of congratulations. The relationship between the two would later become strained as Barsoum began to vehemently oppose Assyrian intellectuals. Nuzha described Barsoum as "the false Sheppard" and "conductor of plots," among other things. The clash with the clergy reached its peak when Barsoum formally excommunicated Nuzha; he would be one of the Syriac Orthodox intellectuals excommunicated as the church began to crack down on Assyrian identity with increasing regularity. According to a 20th anniversary issue written by Nuzha, his excommunication took place on Christmas Eve 1939 on the recommendation of SOC priests in Argentina, who believed Nuzha had gone too far with his criticisms. Barsoum would prevent the "Assyrian Association" magazine from entering Syria with the help of security forces, and attempted to undermine Nuzha by alleging he had converted to Catholicism.

The conflict continued until Barsoum's passing in 1957. Despite the conflict and excommunication, other figures in the church, namely Philoxenos Yuhanon Dolabani, continued to receive the magazine. Additionally, Ignatius Ya'qub III, who was reported to have been good friends with Nuzha, retracted his excommunication in the late 1950s. In conversations with Patriarch Ya'qub III, Nuzha described Athanasius Yeshue Samuel as "the bishop who lost his mind." SOC priest Aziz Günel attempted to establish contact with Nuzha in 1969, stating that he was a secret admirer of his works.

== Death and legacy ==
The year which Nuzha passed away has never been confirmed, though most sources state that he died in 1971. (Note: Some sources that cite 1971 as the year for Nuzha's death include Yonan, Atto, Donabed & Mako, Haninke, and Shapera.) Alongside Faiq and Freydun Atturaya, he is remembered for his contributions to both Assyrian nationalism and the field of Assyrian journalism. Assyrian activists have since elevated Nuzha, alongside these and other figures such as Ashur Yousif and Toma Audo, to the status of symbolizing the Assyrian nation by activists. Nuzha is also remembered for his distinct position on secularism within the Assyrian community.

Nuzha is more well known among Assyrians who still live in West Asia, likely because of his position within the small Syriac Orthodox Assyrian community in Argentina. Annually on 1 November, Assyrians commemorate Nuzha's work, including "The Assyrian Association," during Assyrian Journalism Day. Nuzha's work would go on to inspire other Assyrian nationalist activists such as Ninos Aho. In Buenos Aires, original copies of the Assyrian Association magazine were on display in an exhibit at the Museum of Immigrants until December 2025. Philoxenos Yuhanon Dolabani had saved most issues of Nuzha's magazine, but by 2003, most of them had either disappeared or were destroyed. Assyrian journalist Augin Kurt Haninke states that the loss of the issues may have been because they were "dragged away and shoved in some corner."

== Bibliography ==
- Al-Jeloo, Nicholas (2019). "Advances in Assyrian Language Development and Education in Iran and Ottoman Turkey (1835-1918)". Kukhwa d Beth Nahrain (Star of Mesopotamia). Duhok: Assyrian Cultural Center Nohadra: 7.
- Atto, Naures (2011). Hostages in the Homeland, Orphans in the Diaspora: Identity Discourses Among the Assyrian/Syriac Elites in the European Diaspora (PDF). Leiden University Press.
- Donabed, Sargon; Mako, Shamiran (1 September 2009). "Ethno-Cultural and Religious Identity of Syrian Orthodox Christians". Revue d'Histoire de l'Université de Balamand. ISSN 1608-7526 – via SSRN.
- Donabed, Sargon (17 September 2015). Reforging a Forgotten History: Iraq and the Assyrians in the Twentieth Century. Edinburgh University Press. p. 232. ISBN 978-0-7486-8605-6. JSTOR 10.3366/j.ctt14brxg2.
- Haninke, Augin Kurt (10 September 2017). The Heirs of Patriarch Shaker. Nineveh Press. ISBN 9789198410075.
- Makko, Aryo (19 July 2017). "The Assyrian "concept of unity" after Seyfo" (PDF). The Assyrian Genocide: Cultural and Political Legacies (1st ed.). London. pp. 239–253. doi:10.4324/9781315269832. ISBN 9781315269832.
- Yonan, Gabriele (1978). Assyrer heute: Kultur, Sprache, Nationalbewegung der aramäisch sprechenden Christen im Nahen Osten : Verfolgung und Exil [Assyrians today: Culture, language, national movement of Aramaic-speaking Christians in the Middle East: Persecution and exile] (in German). Society for Threatened Peoples. ISBN 9783922197003.
