= Syriac nationalism =

There are two main competing flavours of Syriac (Assyrian) nationalism:

- Assyrianism
- Aramaeanism

== See also ==
- Assyrian naming dispute
- Phoenicianism
