= Assyrian naming dispute =

Name disputes among the Assyrian people

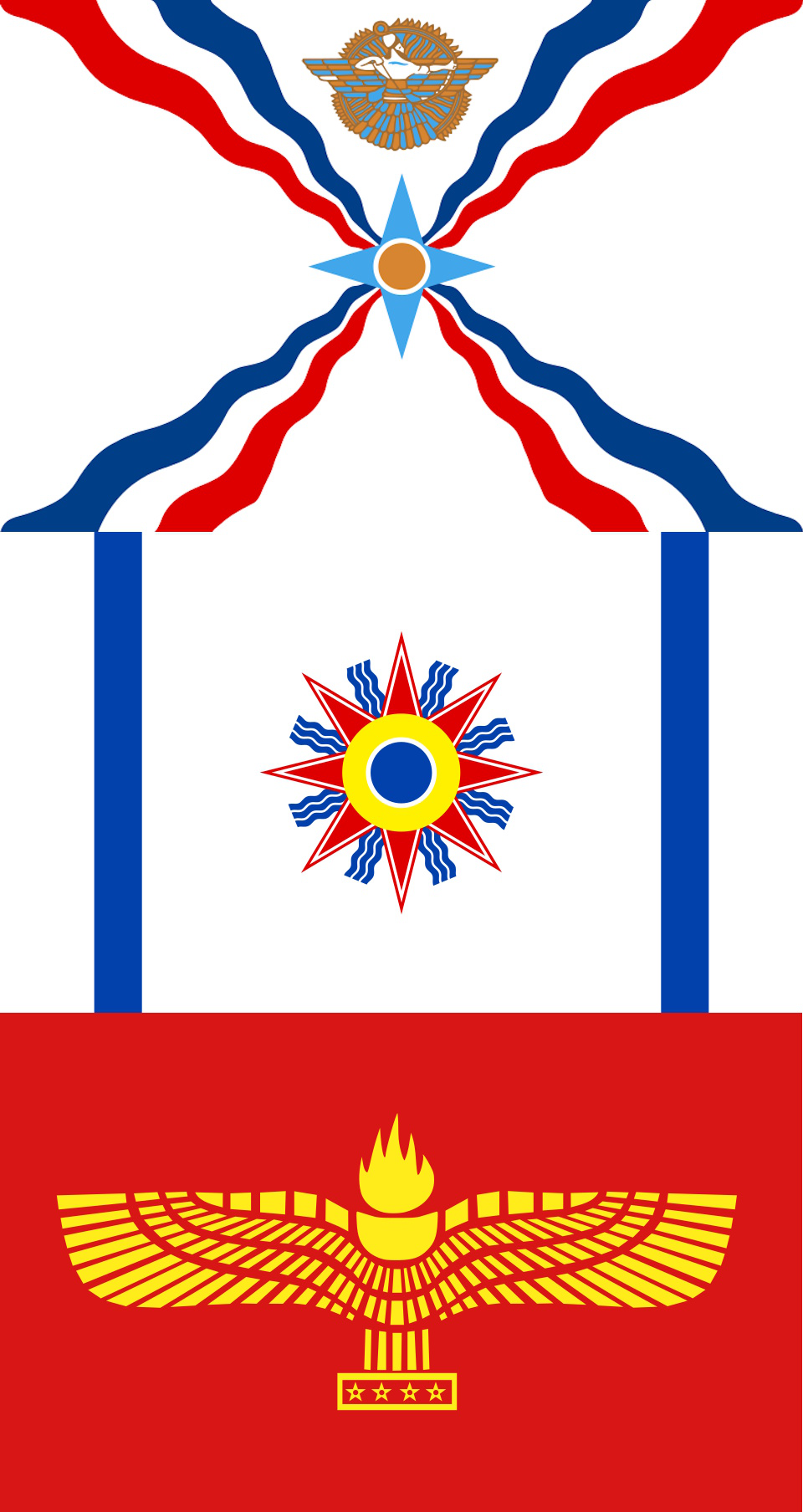
The Assyrian, Chaldean and Aramean flags

Since the mid-to-late 20th century, there has been a debate over the most appropriate ethnic name for Assyrians. Such debates are divided into distinct arguments that fall on the declaration of three unique identities, especially in diaspora, and are usually defined by the Syriac Christian denomination one belongs to:

- Assyrian: Assyrian is the most common label used, being employed by the Assyrian Church of the East as well as adherents of the Chaldean Catholic Church, the Syriac Orthodox Church, and the Syriac Catholic Church. The Ancient Church of the East, Assyrian Pentecostal Church, and Assyrian Evangelical Church also use the label. Assyrian identity is understood as reflecting a common ancestry and factors of peoplehood, predating religious or geographical division.
- Chaldean: Within the Chaldean Catholic Church, some members will declare a Chaldean identity that is distinct or even ethnically separate from an Assyrian one. Additional claims, albeit in the minority, include that Chaldean Catholics descend from southern Iraq and the former ancient civilization state of Chaldea. The label is most prominent among Iraqi Assyrian communities.
- Syriac/Aramean: Within the Syriac Orthodox Church (and a minority of Syriac Catholics), an Aramean identity is espoused, claiming ancestry to the Semitic-speaking Arameans and emphasizing the Aramaic language as part of cultural background. The identity is often linked with a "Syriac" element, especially after 2000.

The emergence of the Assyrian naming dispute is tied to the Ottoman millet system and the antagonistic divisions created based on church denominations. From the early 20th century onward, shifts in identity were greatly influenced by the Assyrian genocide, though the catalyst for the dispute itself is often cited as being the later Simele massacre. Starting from the 1960s and 70s, issues of identity became more apparent and resulted in high-scale conflicts between different factions, which constituted tribalist infighting, positions on secular or religious identity, and individual political interests. Since then, the dispute has been amplified by successive human rights violations against Assyrians in Iraq, including the Kurdistan Region.

Disputes around ethnic identity are more over the question of the name itself, rather than a question of separate ethnicities (though advocacy for such exists in the minority). Nowadays, the dispute tends to be more political than historical or religious. Generally, Assyrian identity is more likely to be used by those who prioritize politics and secular initiatives, while Aramean and Chaldean identities are used by those who prioritize religious values and heritage. Names belonging to the community are recognized to represent one people who have different views on the subject of identity.

The Assyrian naming dispute has contributed to greater intra-communal division, often on a visibly social level. The rise of the Internet and other online communication technologies has made the dispute more visible and volatile than ever before, and the subject has since dominated Assyrian internal discourse. Additionally, the dispute is also noted as having been taken advantage of politically by external actors, more recently the Kurdistan Democratic Party, to undermine Assyrian political interests, and religious advocacy for separate Chaldean/Aramean identities have since been characterized by expressions of anti-Assyrian internalized racism. Though compromises have been previously suggested, few have been implemented with varying degrees of success, but a comprehensive solution to the dispute has not yet been achieved.

== Etymology ==
Today, Assyrians are known by various names, such as Chaldeans, Syriacs, Syrians (not to be confused with Syrians from the country of Syria), Jacobites, Nestorians, Arameans, or a combination thereof. Endonyms such as "Suraye/Suroye", "Suryaye/Suryoye", and "Süryani" are also used. The various names attributed to Assyrians have different religious, historical, and/or doctrinal backgrounds, have been used interchangeably, and imply different understandings of ethnic/cultural heritage, with some only representing a fraction of the larger people.

Assyrians across all denominations and identities primarily use "Suraye/Suroye" (Syriac: ܣܘܼܪ̈ܝܐ) or "Suryaye/Suryoye" (Syriac: ܣܘܪ̈ܝܝܐ) to identify themselves natively. This term was coined as a self-designation by Mesopotamian Christians in Edessa in at least the fifth century AD, quickly gaining widespread usage in both what would come to be called the West and East Syriac traditions, themselves deriving from Syria, which itself ultimately derives from the Akkadian word for Assyria, "Aššūr". Suraye and Suryoye are also the origins of names used in reference to spoken Aramaic dialects ("Sureth", "Suryoyo", etc.). These two words, alongside "Athuraye", "Othuroye", "Aturaye", "Ashuri", "Athuri", "Asuri", and other variants trace back to the same roots etymologically and were used interchangeably. Members of the community in Tur Abdin had previously used the terms "Suroye/Suroyo" and "Surayt" for people and language until around the 1990s.

Although there is no specific term to describe the naming dispute itself, many academics have noted that the arguments exist and define them in various ways. Anthropologist Naures Atto has previously written about the discourse of identity in Sweden, and the antagonism of the label "Syrianer" to the by-then used "Assyriska". Similarly, professor at Roger Williams University Sargon Donabed and Erica McClure have previously written about the dispute as a linguistic one, relating to the meaning and significance of several identifiers or Neo-Aramaic dialects in formulating modern identity. In the past, the dispute has been labeled as an "identity conflict", an "appelative conundrum", a "name debate", the "Assyrian identity crisis", and "the ethnic Assyrian debate".

In the context of Assyrians, a person who advocates for separation into a distinct Chaldean or Aramean identity, while disavowing connection to other Assyrians or Assyrian ancestry, is considered to be a "separatist." The term has primarily been used surrounding the emergence of Chaldean identity and the political actions of clergymen, namely Sarhad Yawsip Jammo and Ibrahim Namo Ibrahim.

== Origins ==
The Assyrians are a stateless ethnic group indigenous to Mesopotamia, originating from a homeland that is now spread across the present-day boundaries of northern Iraq, southeastern Turkey, northeastern Syria, and northwestern Iran. They are considered to be some of the first converts to Christianity, alongside the ancient Arameans and the Armenians, Greeks, and Nabataeans. References to both the ancient Assyrians and the ancient Arameans are present within Syriac tradition. Assyrians belong to different native church denominations, including; the Assyrian Church of the East, the Ancient Church of the East, the Chaldean Catholic Church, the Syriac Orthodox Church, and the Syriac Catholic Church. Smaller numbers of Assyrians belong to other Christian denominations or are non-Christian.

=== Church formations ===
==== Church of the East ====
The Church of the East (COE) was originally formed in Mesopotamia during the time of the Parthian Empire. In the year 431, a controversy surrounding the nature of the Virgin Mary was raised by the Archbishop of Constantinople Nestorius, which was convened at the Council of Ephesus. Disputes between the two schools of the Council, the Antiochenes and the Alexandrians, involved the whole Mediterranean, but ended with the latter obtaining the majority agreement. The Nestorian label was first applied to the Church of the East due to its refusal to condemn Nestorius at the Council of Ephesus in 431. However, the label is nowadays considered theologically incorrect, and has been considered a misnomer by scholars such as Syriacist Sebastian Brock, as he argues the ideology of Nestorius can not be equated with the Christology of the COE. By the seventh and eighth centuries, the COE had a widespread period of growth into different parts of the Near East and across Asia.

In 1968, with support from the federal government of Iraq, the Church of the East split into new and old calendar variants, with the old calendar variant being the newly formed Ancient Church of the East (ACE). The Iraqi government recognized the breakaway group of the ACE and the election of their Catholicos-Patriarch Thoma Darmo, and even confiscated properties to be delivered to the new church. Under the leadership of Shimun XXIII Eshai and his successor, Dinkha IV, the Church of the East changed its name to the Assyrian Church of the East (ACOE) in 1976.

==== Syriac Orthodox Church ====
The Syriac Orthodox Church (SOC) is part of the Eastern Christian Oriental Orthodox churches that were formally in communion with the State church of the Roman Empire before the Council of Chalcedon in 451 AD. Following the council, various Christological controversies occurred that resulted in a battle for the position of Patriarchate between supporters and opponents. On the western end of the border between the Roman Empire and Sasanian Empire, the Western Syrians found themselves in support of Miaphysitism, which periodically resulted in persecution under Byzantian rule. Geographical divisions that existed during this time began to take on an increasingly theological direction, resulting in a split with the COE. The church and its adherents received the name 'Jacobite' after Bishop of Edessa Jacob Baradaeus, who ordained most of the miaphysite hierarchy of the church in the sixth century.

The split into Monophysitism and Dyophysitism created identity shifts among Assyrians at the behest of clergymen, in response to the Roman-Persian geographic boundaries created. In turn, these divisions developed into identity markers that persisted over centuries, defined by denominational differences.

==== Chaldean Catholic Church ====
The Chaldean Catholic Church (CCC) was formed out of the Schism of 1552, when the Church of the East split into two factions. During Shemon IV's reign as patriarch, the practice of patriarchal succession had been made hereditary, which often resulted in controversies and schisms within the church. Upon his death, his brother Shemon VII Ishoyahb succeeded him; upon his passing, his nephew Eliya VI ascended to the patriarchate. In opposition to this policy, a group of bishops from Amid (modern day Diyarbakir) and Salmas elected Yohannan Sulaqa, who was the abbot of the Rabban Hormizd Monastery in Alqosh at the time. To affirm his succession to the patriarchate, Sulaqa travelled to Rome where he entered communion with the Catholic Church. The name "Chaldean" was given to the church in order to distinguish itself from members of the COE.

The new church was accepted by the faithful of Mardin and Diyarbekir, but did not catch on elsewhere. Most Chaldeans who are originally from Iraq converted from the COE to the Chaldean church in the 1800s. Around this time, Assyrians fleeing the Massacres of Bedir Khan were encouraged to convert in exchange for assistance, something which SOC and COE members did not receive. The church was strongest in urban contexts, namely in Mosul, Diyarbekir, and Mardin.

==== Syriac Catholic Church ====
The Syriac Catholic Church (SCC) follows the West Syriac Rite of liturgy but is a jurisdiction of the Eastern Catholic Churches. The earlier causes of the church's formation began in the 1660s, when Jesuit and Capuchin missionaries began a pro-Catholic movement within the Syriac Orthodox Church. In 1662, Ignatius Andrew Akijan, who was pro-Catholic, was elected to the seat of patriarch. Throughout the 18th century, Syriac Catholics faced harsh living conditions under the Empire due to their lack of recognition. Hostile relations with the SOC prevented independence for the church and a consistent succession of Catholic bishops until 1782, when Ignatius Michael III Jarweh of Aleppo was elected Patriarch. Like with the Chaldean Catholic Church, the Syriac Catholic Church was also strongest in urban contexts.

=== Ottoman Millet system ===
In the Ottoman Empire, the millet system divided non-Muslim groups based on religious affiliation, and provided these various groups with autonomous self-government for the purpose of maintaining responsibilities of tax payments and security. The system was closely linked to the tenets of Islamic law for non-Muslims living under Muslim authority. It served to make several religious minorities within the Empire represented within its space, albeit as second-class citizens; in the case of Assyrians, the millet system contributed to their status as a minority.

The Syriac Catholic Church received millet status in 1829. The Chaldean Catholic Church, which was formerly defined by its affiliation with the Church of the East, was granted millet status in 1844. The Church of the East applied for millet status in 1864, although this was rejected by Ottoman authorities; the church did not receive status as a unique millet until 1914. Different from other Christian communities was that the COE enjoyed relative autonomous status in areas where Ottoman authorities had little influence. The Syriac Orthodox Church had previously been under the jurisdiction of the Armenian millet, linked by virtue of being non-Chalcedonian theologically. However, following various inner church conflicts, a series of petitions (often numbering into the thousands) were made by the SOC under Ignatius Peter IV and its dioceses for a separate millet. After the Tanzimat reforms, the SOC was declared its own millet independent of the Armenians in 1882.

Assyrians predominated within the four millets corresponding to these churches, and were recognized differently on a legal scale. Although they were still considered to be the same ethnicity, the growing religious and geographic divides across churches greatly reduced kinship and encouraged animosity amongst them. As church membership preceded other forms of identification, members of the Church of the East in Hakkari did not feel social bonds with the Syriac Orthodox of Tur Abdin, and even within these churches, disputes between Syriac Catholic and Chaldean Catholic designations had arisen. (Note: Protestant/missionary influences made it much more likely for members to convert to Catholicism, especially if they were in urban areas.) For many of these millets' leaders, who were patriarchs of their respective churches, unity as a nation-millet would mean relinquishing the individual power they had as temporal and spiritual heads. Amplified by political pressures, the impacts of the Ottoman millet system have persisted in the political involvement of clergymen.

=== Assyrian genocide and nationalism ===
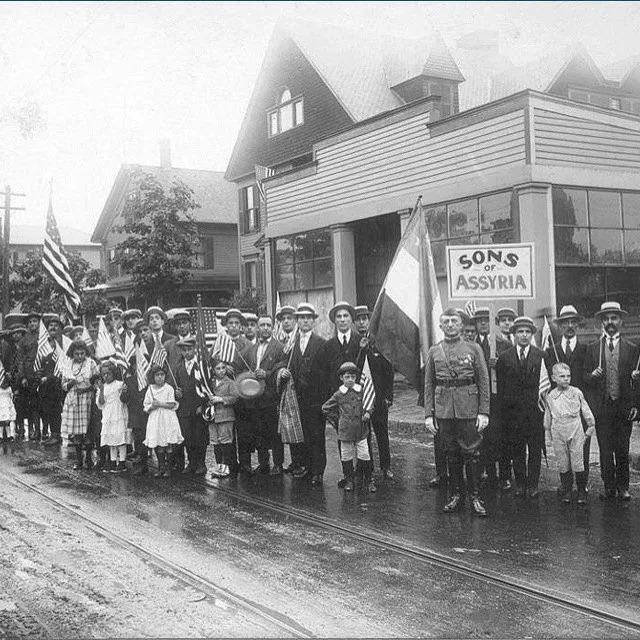
A group of Syriac Orthodox Assyrians and leader Abraham K. Yoosef holding the older variant of the Assyrian flag, and a sign reading "Sons of Assyria"

The Assyrian genocide (also known as Sayfo) was less systematic than the Armenian genocide, indicating that local circumstances mitigated general anti-Christian views. However, Assyrians were still victim to the Turkish nationalist sentiments of the Committee of Union and Progress, which sought to homogenize the nation. Sayfo resulted in the deaths of at least a third of the Assyrian population at the time, which contributed to the division and weakening of traditional structures which by then were used to identify the community. Many found themselves in new or enlarged refugee communities in countries such as Syria, Lebanon and Armenia, and in the Americas and Europe.

From just before Sayfo, Assyrian nationalism began to develop, encompassing a uniting ideology under various Syriac-rite churches in the space of the Ottoman Empire. With the emergence of Protestant-sponsored education near Urmia and increased literacy, publications and political thought began to emerge, stressing the need to surpass denominational schisms under a uniting name. Alongside figures such as Freydun Atturaya, various Assyrians of the Syriac Orthodox Church had advocated for a nation state and unity under the Assyrian name. Ashur Yousif, who was Syriac Orthodox, was one of the first Assyrian nationalists to receive Western education and encompass a uniting ideology amongst Assyrians. Naum Faiq was also one of the earliest advocates for unity irrespective of millet, and advocated for the use of "Asuroye" over "Suryoye" or "Suroye".

Assyrians in Massachusetts, who were Syriac Orthodox, also expressed similar ideals for unity and hopes for an Assyrian nation state. The original Assyrian flag was designed by Syriac Orthodox adherents, with three white stars representing the three main churches of the Assyrian people. These Assyrians also had joint events with members of the Church of the East and even intermarried, with their associations using the label to represent a secular identity. Members of the Syriac Orthodox diaspora formed various organizations and institutions encompassing Assyrian (Süryânî) identity, and translated "Süryânî kîlîsesî" as the "Assyrian (Apostolic) Church".

Former Patriarch of the Syriac Orthodox Church Afram Barsoum, who at the time was Archbishop of Syria & Lebanon, was one of the leaders of the Assyro-Chaldean delegation at the Paris Peace Conference, alongside Abraham K. Yoosef. Barsoum presented six requests on behalf of his people and Ignatius Elias III, whom he addressed as descendants of the Assyrian nation, and put a case for Assyrian autonomy. These cases defined the Assyrian people as including Nestorians, Chaldeans, Jacobites, Maronites, Assyrians in Russia, Persian Assyrians, Yazidis, and the Muslim Shekak tribe. Similarly, Yousef VI Emmanuel II Thomas, then patriarch of the CCC, advocated for the creation of an Assyrian homeland when he met with the American King-Crane Commission.

Among Chaldean Catholics and Syriac Orthodox, nationalism was not significant early on, and clergymen feared that embracing it would mean certain ruin. Most Syriac Orthodox villagers, especially in Tur Abdin, were rarely exposed to Assyrian nationalist sentiments, and due in part to Sayfo, greater Assyrian nationalism was unable to reach areas outside of Urmia and Hakkari, as many leaders had emigrated or were killed. At the same time, issues arose with the Paris Peace Conference and attempts for autonomy; Agha Petros, an Assyrian military leader who was Chaldean Catholic, had posed an umbrella approach that was rejected by religious leaders, who favored British protection fearing rule under a Kurdish or Armenian state, and likewise feared losing church power. He had previously made repeated demands for an autonomous Assyrian state to be created. The concept of Assyrian nationalism became more politicized and existed in stark contrast to the religious authority of the churches, particularly the Church of the East.

Barsoum later reflected on his involvement in the Conference, dismayed at the lack of compassion he felt from the Allied powers. By its end, Assyrians were guaranteed minority rights and local autonomy in an independent Kurdistan under the Treaty of Sevres, but these were subdued by the Treaty of Lausanne and never put into effect.

=== Simele massacre ===
By the time the Ottoman Empire dissolved, and with the coming formation of several nation states tied to Arab identity, Assyrians were gradually collectivized in the minds of the majority-Muslim population as "Christians", owing to the legacy of the millet system. For Assyrians of the Church of the East, in contrast with the loyalty of the CCC, SCC and SOC, pushes for an independent nation-state or autonomy were still strong. Hopes for resettlement back to Hakkari were diminished following its inclusion to the Turkish state, and COE Patriarch Shimun XXIII Eshai expressed concerns about how the Assyrians would be treated following the end of the British Mandate. Faisal I attempted to dissuade Eshai Shimun from pursuing the Assyrian question further, but this was to no avail. Arab nationalists and supporters of the Iraqi government quickly cast the Assyrians as British agents who were acting against the interests of the new state. Later conflicts in Dayrabun caused Kurdish-Iraqi army general Bakr Sidqi to send forces upwards to the north, beginning the Simele massacre.

The Simele massacre is often cited as being the catalyst for the modern naming dispute, amplifying the denominational schisms that Assyrians faced. (Note: Sources that refer to the Simele massacre as the catalyst for the Assyrian naming dispute include Benjamen, Cetrez, Dekelaita, Donabed & Mako, Donabed independently, Hughes, Lundgren, Suermann, and Tomass) Following failed negotiations, the Iraqi government exiled Eshai Shimun to Cyprus and the COE relocated its Patriarchate to Chicago. At the same time, Chaldean patriarch Mar Yousef VI Emmanuel II Thomas as well as Priest Wadisho of Alqosh and Mor Athanasius Thoma Kassir of Mosul of the SOC, had sent letters under duress congratulating Iraqi authorities for suppressing the Assyrian "rebellion".American resident minister and eyewitness Paul Knabenshue related to the U.S. Secretary of State that these letters were most likely written under threat and duress: "The exaction of false testimonials from the various Christian dignitaries, virtually at the point of the pistol, is a sad testimonial to the integrity of the Iraq government". For Chaldean Catholics and the SOC, it was reason enough to be killed just by being Assyrian, so the perceived solution was to deny any affiliation with Assyrian identity and ethnicity.

== Assyrian identity ==
=== Challenges to nationalism ===
Difficulties with Assyrian nationalism emerged shortly after their ideas spread, as its secular and political tenets were controversial to the authority of the clergy. For instance, in 1917, Shimun XIX Benyamin condemned Freydun Aturaya and the Assyrian Socialist Party as "anarchist" in a complaint to Basil Nikitin, a Russian diplomat. COE figures considered a greater nation under the leadership of intellectuals or military figures a threat to their authority, leading to the failure of its secularization.

=== Consolidation of patriarchal authority ===
After the Simele massacre, Eshai Shimun left Iraq through Cyprus and London, settling the Patriarchate in Chicago in 1940. In Chicago, Eshai Shimun assessed the new situation of Assyrians across the world, leading to him assuming a position of integration as a solely religious minority. This was first expressed in the Light from the East magazine. Scholar of Eastern Christianity Heleen Murre-van den Berg writes that the magazine was a way of keeping the COE community updated through news and publicizing its ecclesiology after their wide geographic spread. She further contends that this program fit with the intentions of the Patriarchate, as Eshai Shimun had likely realized his claims to secular leadership were counterproductive to the aim of integration.

However, PhD candidate at the University of Chicago Joseph Hermiz builds off of Murre-van den Berg's points, stating that Light from the East "treated the Church of the East and the Assyrian nation as functionally synonymous". He argues that the abandonment of territory and the consolidation of Assyrian political identity under his authority were the same development, whereby Eshai Shimun stepped into the center of Assyrian political life. In the magazines February-March 1949 issue, Hermiz highlights how the issues carried a denunciation of Yusuf Malek as a "Chaldean from Baghdad" for allegedly using the Assyrian name without his permission. The issue noted that Malek had been in negotiations with Kurdish leaders, and was part of the political undercurrents that Light from the East had. Between the two World Wars, Eshai Shimun had reasserted the dual authority of the Patriarchate on the temporal and the spiritual level.

By the 1950s, the COE continued to identify with its own traditional millet, causing COE-based Assyrianism to emerge instead of the concept of secular unity. Ideas of cross-denominational secular unity did not reemerge politically until the late 1960s, with the formation of organizations such as the Assyrian Universal Alliance. In the face of what was perceived as threats of Arabization, the Assyrian Democratic Movement was formed in 1979 and established itself as a secular organization aiming to secure Assyrian rights in Iraq. Despite the formation of these organizations, political authority continued to be held by Eshai Shimun at least until the formation of ADM, whereby he managed negotiations with the Iraqi government.

=== Recent years ===
In the early 2000s, sectarian church affiliations outweighed ideas of secular Assyrian-identity among Iraq's Christian community. Political scientist Gregory Kruczek highlights the formation of the Nineveh Plain Protection Units as a means to supersede intragroup cleavages and the naming dispute without completely disregarding them. The ADM thus shifted its recruitment strategy to deemphasizing the issue, while binding indigenous attachment to the Nineveh Plain and adherence to Christianity as its principles.

== Chaldean identity ==
Even before the Simele massacre, the position of the Chaldean Catholic Church was to maintain neutrality in conflict, professing loyalty to the state/rule they were under. Patriarch Thomas' position, as opposed to Mar Eshai Shimun, was to commit to the Arabic national identity of Iraq and to accept rule under the new kingdom. Partly due to his relationship with King Faisal I and his position on the Senate of Iraq, integration for Chaldean Catholics was much higher, and Chaldean life gradually transitioned from the villages to urban centers. These policies under the patriarchate meant that Chaldean Catholics were much more open and prone to Arabization policies in the new Iraqi state, and that resistance was little. They were also aided by fears after Simele, as Chaldeans and the church stayed mostly silent on Assyrian activism, aiming to distance itself from Assyrian nationalism.

At the expense of this upsurge in prosperity, Chaldo-Assyrians began to lose components of Assyrian identity, with increased knowledge of Arabic language over Sureth and the only distinguishing marker being their Chaldean faith. At the same time that Chaldeans received this preferential treatment, Assyrians were banned from declaring their ethnicity on Iraqi censuses in a growing policy of Arabization, and both never lost their minority status as emphasis on religion grew. Denial of Assyrian continuity was systematically publicized in Iraqi books and literature, positing them as refugees who settled in Iraq from Turkey and Iran, fueling the growing divisions. The church began to see itself more as just a religious community, referring to its members as Iraqi or Arab Christians while integration and assimilation continued.

The Ba'athist government of Iraq and Saddam Hussein began to adopt preferential attitudes towards Chaldeans, assisting them in building new churches and schools in bigger cities. Many Chaldeans were also recruited positions within the Iraqi government (such as Tariq Aziz). Hashim Shabeb, formerly Director General of the Iraqi Mass Media under Saddam Hussein, issued an assessment stating:

The Chaldeans will remain always faithful to the government, loyal to Ba'ath party, trustful and dependable in implementing our strategy toward our Christian minorities in Diaspora, while (the Eastern) Assyrians will remain always traitorous and unfaithful to the Iraqi government and the Ba'ath party.

=== Emergence in diaspora ===
Modern Chaldean identity first began to emerge in the Assyrian diaspora; as opposed to their identity as Christians within the Catholic Church, and the developments of Assyrian identity encompassing the various Syriac-rite churches, Chaldean Catholics drew upon their unique membership of the CCC, dialect of Neo-Aramaic, ties to Mesopotamia, and entrepreneurship to define themselves. Chaldean immigration to the United States heightened after the Immigration and Nationality Act of 1965 and was rather homogenous, being mostly from a certain set of villages in northern Iraq (most prominently Tel Keppe) towards the cities of Detroit and San Diego.

Religion was a major basis for out-group formation for Chaldeans. Emphasis on the Chaldean Catholic Church was especially important for immigrants to differentiate themselves from Arabs, ease acculturation and formulate their identity. It served as a central component that the community could universally identify with religiously, and fulfilled family-oriented and socio-religious obligations. By extension, emphasis was placed on the priests for solving the general problems of the population, to the point that no external organizations worked with Chaldean Catholics until the early 1970s (though secular organizations existed during this time, such as the "Chaldean Federation of America").

In 1963, most members of the community predominantly identified themselves by their village ("Telkeffees") and objected to being labeled as Iraqis or Arabs, but eventually they began to shift away from a solely village identity. Around the 1970s and 1980s, many Chaldeans in Detroit regarded themselves as descendants of the Assyrians, and had not identified with Iraq as most had immigrated prior to the founding of the country. However, they were wrought with disagreements over how to identify themselves, complicated by inner subdivisions and Arabization. The discussion over the potential Arab identity of Chaldeans was a controversial one, and although it was growing amongst newer immigrants, Arab nationalist viewpoints were in the minority. Assyrian identity and nationalism was present amongst Chaldeans in Detroit, though it was comparatively small and did not have as significant of an influence as Chaldean/Telkeffee identity or Arab nationalism.

In contrast with the Detroit community, who centered on their religious heritage, Assyrian-American leaders in Turlock, California had a stronger linguistic-nationalistic orientation and attempted to deemphasize denominational differences. A similar position was eventually taken by the Chaldean patriarch Raphael I Bidawid, who clarified in an interview:

I personally think that these different names serve to add confusion. The original name of our Church was the 'Church of the East' ... When a portion of the Church of the East became Catholic, the name given was 'Chaldean' based on the Magi kings who came from the land of the Chaldean, to Bethlehem. The name 'Chaldean' does not represent an ethnicity... We have to separate what is ethnicity and what is religion... I myself, my sect is Chaldean, but ethnically, I am Assyrian.

Sarhad Yawsip Jammo, who was bishop for the Eastern US Diocese of the CCC, is credited as being the first person to create a larger push towards a separate Chaldean identity. Jammo had initially been supportive of Assyrian identity and advocated for unity across ecclesiastical lines, emphasizing that Chaldean and Assyrian were nomenclature from different perspectives that referenced the same people. According to Assyrian-American lawyer Robert Dekelaita, Jammo's primary goal was to reunite the CCC with the ACOE, and from Dekelaita's understanding, he wanted to eventually become the patriarch of the unified church. But when these plans failed, he became obsessively hostile to those that he felt thwarted his plans, namely Dinkha IV and a collectivization of Assyrian nationalists. Having felt that nationalists were hostile to his goals, Jammo became obsessively anti-Assyrian.

=== 2000s and the Iraq War ===
It was with the turn of the Iraq War that movements for separate Chaldean political institutions and activism began to take shape. After the September 11 attacks, Chaldeans living in Michigan were subject to an identity crisis as they fell under increased scrutiny for their Middle Eastern background and could not really define being Chaldean as a unique identity. At the same time, with heightened violence after the 2003 invasion of Iraq, they felt a greater need for lobbying efforts to be made.

Internal divisions increased after the Fall of the Saddam regime; by the time he was appointed bishop, Jammo, alongside Bishop Ibrahim Namo Ibrahim of Michigan, both began to assert a separate Chaldean identity in their respective diaspora centers. In early 2003, Jammo announced the formation of the Chaldean National Congress, and recognized the Chaldean Democratic Union Party as the sole representative of Chaldeans in Iraq. Separatist sentiments among Chaldean Catholics began to gradually widen; later that year in May, both bishops prepared a memorandum that officially asserted a separate Chaldean identity and rejected any common political or nationalist purpose with Assyrians, while a letter sent to Paul Bremer highlighted that "Chaldeans comprise 75% of the Christian Community in Iraq and constitute a distinct ethnicity from Assyrians". By that point, Jammo had begun to use the phrase "Chaldean Renaissance" in public speeches, tying his role as a church leader to diasporic activism. The memorandum called for the declaration of Chaldeans and Assyrians as being separate groups in the Constitution of Iraq based on religious demographics, but it was not endorsed by other bishops nor the then Patriarch Bidawid.

Separation between Chaldean and Assyrian identities continued with the leadership of Emmanuel III Delly, who stated in a 2006 interview "Any Chaldean who calls himself an Assyrian is a traitor and any Assyrian who calls himself Chaldean is a traitor." Delly is purported to have made this statement in Arabic to an Arab crowd.

=== Recent years ===
During his years of leadership, the former patriarch of the CCC, Louis Raphaël I Sako, took differing and often contradictory positions regarding Chaldean identity. In 2015, Sako suggested that Assyrians and Chaldeans be represented as Arameans in the Kurdish constitution, as a means to distance the church's community and himself from politics over ethnic identity. In 2017, Sako released an official statement rejecting the use of the tri-name label "Chaldean Syriac Assyrian", stating that it distorted the Chaldean identity contrary to what was established in the Iraqi constitution. In a 2018 interview with Rudaw Media Network, Sako stated that the three different names of the tri-name label represented one group.

In 2024, Sako called for unity between the CCC, the ACOE, the Ancient COE, and the Evangelical Protestant Church. He had previously outlined a plan for unity with the ACOE in a 2015 statement. In 2026, Sako released a letter that was strongly criticized by Assyrians cross-denominationally, who described it as "divisive rhetoric". Rather than dividing the community further, the letter generated near universal pushback against Sako.

== Aramean identity ==
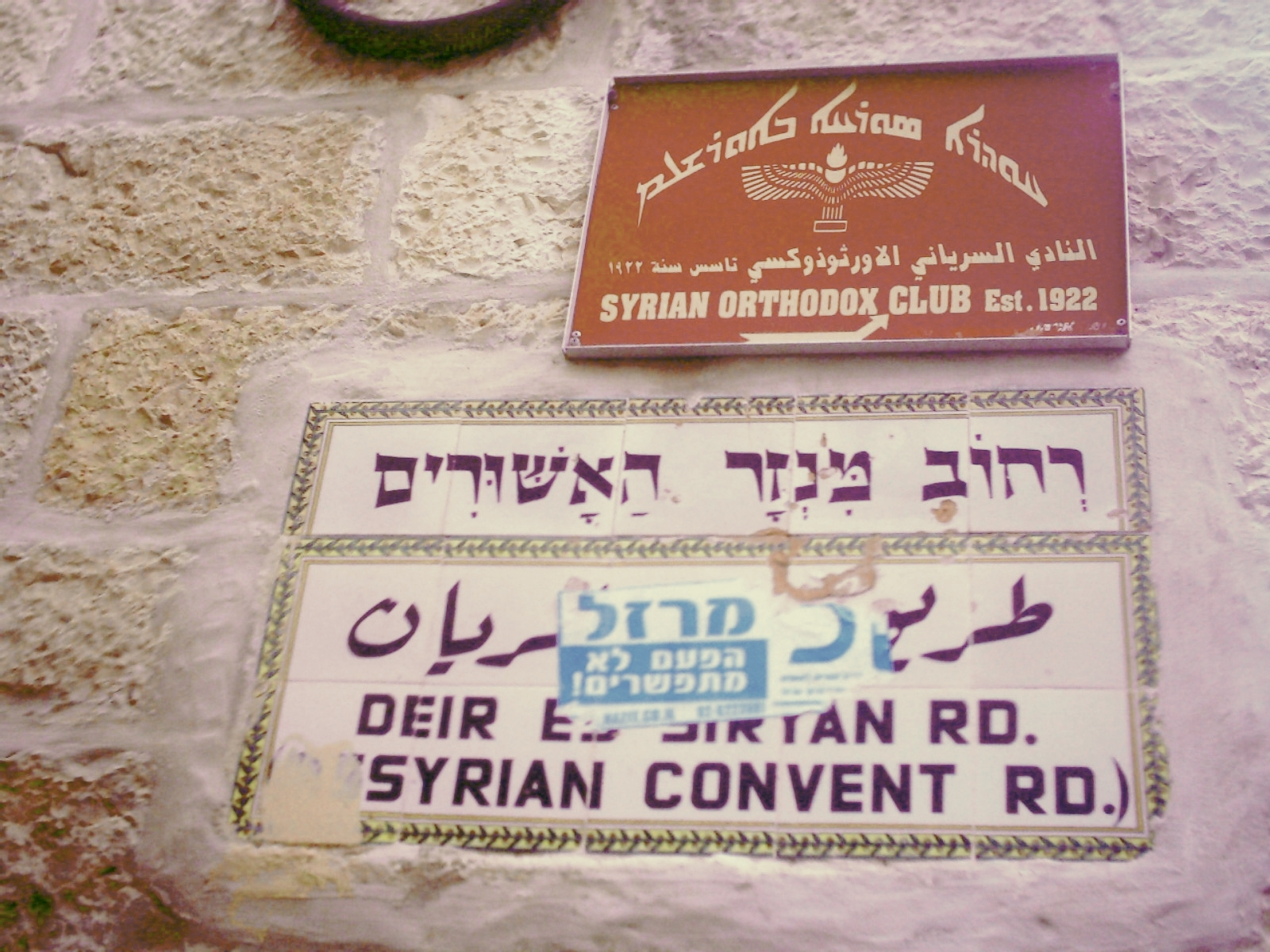
The banner of the Monastery of St. Mark in Jerusalem after its name change; the "As" in "Assyrian" was covered by tape to read only "Syrian"

Issues of minority rights were at the helm of the Syriac Orthodox Church in response to Sayfo and the formation of the Republic of Turkey. As opposed to the Armenians and Greeks, the leadership of the SOC under Ignatius Elias III did not press for minority rights, emphasizing loyalty to the Turkish state. Several sources indicate that Patriarch Shaker encouraged adherents to obey Turkish policy, likely as a political strategy for survival. Exclusion from the Treaty of Lausanne meant that they were not allowed minority rights shared by Armenians, Greeks, and Jews, and ultimately, Patriarch Shaker was expelled from Turkey. The patriarchate of the Syriac Orthodox Church would settle in Homs, Syria following Shaker's expulsion. Syriac Orthodox communities from Tur Abdin, Azakh, and Urfa settled in the Jazira Region and Aleppo after Sayfo.

Similarly to the Chaldean Catholic Church, the SOC were also more open to Arabization in the new Middle Eastern states. Simultaneously, fears of persecution and endangerment resulted in gradual distancing from Assyrian nationalist advocacy. Consequently, Barsoum would eventually be known as "'Qass al 'Uruban" (Priest of the Arabs) among Arab nationalists, and defend Arab rights for the sake of the church's safety. While some Arabic-speaking Syriac Christians saw themselves as Arab Christians, others across both West and East Syriac rites used Assyrian nomenclature in both diaspora and the Middle East.

Although soon-to-be Patriarch Ignatius Aphrem I, then Archbishop Severus Aphram Barsoum, supported the Assyrian political movement during the Paris Peace Conference, he preferred to translate the Church's name in English as "Syrian", insisting it should be used in his 1927 visit to the United States, where parishes offered resistance to this proposal. A few decades later, the issue was brought up again under the now-Patriarch Ignatius Aphrem I and Mor Athanasius Yeshue, then Archbishop of Jerusalem and Patriarchal Vicar to North America and soon to be Archbishop of the United States and Canada, specifically amidst the arrival of fellow Arabic-speaking Syriac Orthodox faithful from Palestine who were more familiar with the name "Syrian". Athanasius used the name "Assyrian" to denote his standing in the United States, while using "Syrian" to refer to the church. Parishes established after this period would use the name "Syrian Orthodox" and conflicted with the earlier established parishes that went by "Assyrian Orthodox". Thus, Ignatius Aphrem I wrote the 1952 publication "The Syrian Church of Antioch: Its Name and History", insisting that the use of the English term 'Assyrian' for the Church contradicts "1. the historical truth, 2. ancient tradition, 3. the identity of our nation in all countries, and 4. the consensus of Western scholars: French, English, German, Italian, and American", favoring the name "Syrian" or even "Syrian-Aramean", although only Syrian would see any official usage. Despite this, for the remainder of Ignatius Aphrem I's Patriarchate, parishes continued to use the Assyrian name, although often a compromise was reached using "Suryani Orthodox Church". George Kiraz mentions that some of the elderly remember a more fierce denial of the Assyrian name by Mor Aphrem Barsoum during his visit to North America and by Mor Athanasius, mentioning there is likely a large oral component to the early dispute, although noting from letters such as that of Charles Manoog to Mor Athanasius, "no member of the diocesan committee or our archbishop has ever asked these two churches to change their name from Assyrian to Syrian. It is some members of these churches who insist that the diocese name and the name of our Patriarchate and our religion be changed to Assyrian instead of Syrian.". These parishes ultimately accepted the standardization of Syrian after the formation of the Archdiocese of the United States with Mor Athanasius as Archbishop under Patriarch Ignatius Ya'qub III, which officially began using "Syrian" to translate the Church's name in official documents. The switch from Assyrian to Syrian would also occur in Athanasius's other archdiocese, Jerusalem, where "Assyrian" and "Syrian" were previously used interchangeably. In response to Athanasius' name modifications to the church, a group of Assyrian families established an effort between 1960 and 1962 to convert to the COE.

Gradual adoption of Syrian nationalism, namely by those from Urfa, started in the 1930s in order to integrate into the new Syrian society and state, crafting their collective memories into the development of a religious identity. This gradual adoption of Syrian nationalism began to replace Assyrian identity through developing into religious identity (Syriac) and then Aramean identity. By the 1950s, the Syrian Orthodox (Syrianism) identity was built as a concept in contrast to the Church of the East-based Assyrian identity concept. For secular SOC members, this provided a plausible way for them to express ideas while still remaining a non-threat to the Ba'athist Syrian government. For others, they felt that it was more beneficial to do so in order to silence any discussion on Christian persecution and to differentiate themselves from Kurds. Due to its lack of association to a concrete state, Aramean identity was seen as less threatening to Arab nationalists, making it a convenient alternative to "Assyrian" and "Syrian" labels.

=== Growing identity in diaspora ===
Syriac Orthodox immigration to European countries began in the 1960s, mostly from Tur Abdin. However, following the outbreak of the Kurdish–Turkish conflict, immigration was heightened as Assyrians had no protection from the violence, alongside growing Muslim-Christian tensions and persecution as a result of the Cyprus problem. Additional opportunities for immigration and conflicts in other countries prompted increased flights to Europe. Most left for Germany and Sweden, though smaller numbers arrived in the Netherlands and Austria, primarily as guest workers. After Germany adopted a more restrictive asylum and visa policy around 1980, many settled in Sweden as a "last stop".

For many immigrants, political recognition was important to help other Suryoye living in Tur Abdin to maintain their rights. However, what challenged this was the emphasis on Christianity, previously enough to distinguish themselves in the Middle East but not in Europe. Similarly to Chaldeans, Syriac Orthodox were forced to change their relationship with identity from solely religion after arriving in majority Christian countries, although the church had played an important role in fulfilling religious and social obligations. Assyrianism was initially, for many immigrants, a way to build a growing and distinct identity that differentiated them from other Middle Eastern and European Christians. For them, it was also considered a breath of fresh air for ethnic expression that was stifled by discrimination in Turkey, in which they commonly hid their identity.

After attaining asylum in Sweden, Assyrians began using newly accessible resources to establish organizations, the first of which being the Assyrian Association in Sodertalje (Swedish: Assyriska föreningen i Södertälje) in 1971.

=== Increasing naming conflict ===
According to historian David Gaunt, oral history suggests that naming conflicts began in 1960s Germany, when religious leaders in the SOC protested the use of "Assyrian" in their churches, and insisted on the use of "Aramaic" on the basis of linguistic continuity. After initial success in unifying initiatives among Syriac Orthodox youth, particularly with the establishment of the Assyrian Democratic Organization, clergymen once again adopted a confrontational attitude to the idea of Assyrianism and secular thought. This time period was the first time a clear Aramean identity was unquestionably promoted by social and cultural groups.

Although there was a period of hegemonic use of "Assyrian" (Swedish: Assyrier) in the 60s and 70s, by the mid-1970s the naming conflict became increasingly apparent in Sweden. During this time, the neologism "Syrianer" developed in opposition to Assyrian identity. On the one hand, several claimed an ancient Assyrian past and were more secular; by default, Swedish authorities used Assyrier due to their previous contacts with the Church of the East. On the other hand, a separate faction ('Syrianer') felt that the Assyrian name held connections to paganism which they wanted no part of, and reduced the importance of the Syriac Orthodox Church in their thousands-year long history. Simultaneously, the Syriac group upheld an ancestry that was inherently religious, finding it hard to accept an Assyrian designation after suddenly arriving in the country.

In the course of the naming conflict, there were various instances of switching sides between one identity to another. The Syriac network of organizations was younger compared to the Assyrian one, was closer with the Syriac Orthodox Church, and partook in activities considered reactionary to Assyrian initiatives. The Assyrian Association was split in 1976 by former members to create the Syriac Association (Swedish: Syrianska föreningen i Södertälje). Various Aramean/Syriac groups were founded by former members of Assyrian groups; for example, Syrianska FC was founded by former members of Assyriska FF in 1977 due to the heightened disagreements caused by the conflict. Similarly, in Vienna, Austria, many former Assyrian activists eventually embraced Aramean identity and switched sides, and an association was formed after attempts to create a youth organization under the church umbrella failed because of refusal to use "Assyrian" in its legal registration document.

The "Aramean" name would seldom play a role in the early diaspora naming dispute, although Ignatius Aphrem I initially cited "Aramean" or "Syrian-Aramean" as more accurate names for the Church. Early Syriac Orthodox writers in North America, such as Naum Faiq, writing in Syriac and Arabic, used the words Assyrian, Syrian, and Aramean interchangeably, a trend that was also seen in the works of the Archbishop of Mardin, Philoxenos Yuhanon Dolabani and even the Patriarch Ignatius Ya'qub III himself, then Archbishop of Lebanon and Damascus, stating "we are the Assyrians and Arameans who during the early ages were the forerunners of the civilized nations who gave humanity education and knowledge". It was in Europe, following the rise of secular Assyrian and Aramean associations, where parishes were divided on using whether to identify as either Assyrian or Aramean, with many clergymen such as Julius Yeshu Çiçek supporting a strictly Aramean identity.

Contention over common ancestry and name was the cause of riots among Syriac Orthodox refugees from southeast Turkey in Sweden, leading to the murder of a prominent Assyrian activist, Aslan Noyan. Over the course of the conflict, certain clergymen in the church emphasized the denominational differences by associating Assyrian identity with the Nestorian doctrine, in order to fuel antagonism to the identity. The same issues of identity were hotly debated in the Netherlands, namely in the towns of Enschede and Hengelo. Swedish authorities were ultimately surprised by the rising naming conflict in the country, prompting scientific investigations to explain the differing claims. These investigations were mostly linguistic in nature and researched dialects of Neo-Aramaic and the relationship between "Syrian" and "Assyrian". Investigations also studied the theological differences between the SOC and COE, and their historical reasoning for isolation and antagonism between each other. Ultimately, they settled on "Syrian" or the hyphenated "Assyr/Syrian". The policies that the Swedish government applied to the naming conflict is said to have contributed to the division, rather than overcome it, as they adopted harsh policies towards immigrants and understood little about the Assyrian community's internal dynamics.

The Church's official response to the clashes in Sweden was to oppose secular associations on both sides, viewing them as sources of division. To clarify the Church's identity amidst this dispute, the Holy Synod under Ignatius Zakka I stated that since St. Peter "Head of the Apostles, established its See in Antioch-Syria until this day", the church is known as the "Syrian Orthodox Church" (ʿIto Suryoyto Orthodoxoytho), its language the "Syriac language" (Leshono Suryoyo), and its people the "Syrian people" (ʿAmo Suryoyo). While the Synod did not explicitly condemn the usage of such names alongside acceptance of "Suryoyo", Ignatius Zakka I and the Syrian Orthodox Church's board in Sweden would continue to take a strict stance against both secular "Assyrian" and "Aramean" associations. The name "Assyrian Orthodox Church" would continue to see usage in the United States parish of Paramus, New Jersey, and following a dispute among the Syriac Orthodox community of Los Angeles, made up of Arabic-speaking immigrants from Palestine (who preferred "Aramaic") and from Syria (who preferred "Syrian"), a compromise was made where the signage on the church building would read "Syrian Orthodox Church according to the Aramaic rite.".

By the 1980s, Aramean identity developed into a fully-fledged rival to Assyrian identity by certain clergymen, who began a campaign to discredit anyone who associated themselves with Assyrian nationalism. In one instance, Julius Yeshu Çiçek began removing any mentions of Assyrians in his writings despite formerly being a member of an Assyrian association in Berlin. It was at this point that the lay elite identifying as Aramean gained hegemony in competition with the Assyrian lay elite, and had actively boycotted reintegration of community members identifying as Assyrians. In Sweden, the two SOC parishes were split along secular Assyrian and Aramean ideologies, and remain in place to this day.

In April 2000, the Holy Synod changed the church's official name from "Syrian" to "Syriac" in order to avoid confusion with the Syrian nationality. Since then, scholars and church officials began increasingly using "Syriac" in place of "Syrian", although this has been accused of having a subtle Aramean element. The film The Hidden Pearl which was commissioned by multiple committees of prominent individuals within the Syriac Orthodox community, including then Patriarch of Antioch, Ignatius Zakka I, was also cited as a point of contention for the naming dispute, with statements that the authors spoke from an unequivocally Aramean perspective that was challenged by others in the Assyrian community.

=== Recent years ===
Under the leadership of Ignatius Aphrem II, the naming dispute within the SOC has largely toned down, with the Patriarch insisting on using the label "Suryoye" to unite the community outside of the Assyrian and Aramean designations currently used. However, Mor Aphrem II's stance on the dispute provoked discord from organizations who espoused Aramean identity, namely the World Council of Arameans, who questioned his calls for unity. In 2017, he addressed a letter to the WCA, in which he criticized the organization for attempting to examine the convictions of the church in regards to the naming dispute, and statements indicating that the church did not take a clear stance on Aramean identity.

In 2025, a small controversy began during a visit to Sweden by Ignatius Aphrem II, when he was accompanied by a parade of church adherents waving the Aramean flag. The move was criticized by Assyrian activist Nemrod Barkarmo in the Swedish-Assyrian magazine Huyada, who remarked Aphrem's 2015 interview with Assyria TV stating the church's neutrality to the conflict. Barkarmo's criticism was itself subsequently criticized by Bahro Suryoyo of Syrianska Riksförbundet.

== Common arguments ==
Among those identifying as Chaldean, a vocal minority of activists stress that modern Chaldeans are descendants of ancient Chaldea and have ancestry from southern Babylon. Activists who support this theory respond to claims that the ancient Chaldeans died out by stating that they were forced to change ethnicity or religion in light of mounting persecution, while other claims argue that the Chaldeans were the ones who assisted in the overthrow of the Assyrian empire, therefore the Aramaic speakers of the region were ethnic Chaldeans. Mary Sengstock, an anthropologist from Wayne State University, cited that Babylon and Chaldeans were in the South while modern Chaldeans were in the North (Assyria).

Arguments against Assyrian identity by some Chaldeans often portray it as heretical by the basis of religion, accusing those who identify as Assyrians of paganism and worshipping ancient Mesopotamian religion due to embracing it. Those in favor of Aramean identity emphasize that a number of church fathers explicitly claimed an Aramean identity, believing they did not claim the ancient Assyrians as part of their heritage.

A common claim made by those in support of Chaldean or Aramean identity argues that modern Assyrian identity was invented by the British during the Mandate era and imposed onto the community, which they argue had not previously identified with Assyrians beforehand. Contenders for Syriac-Aramean identity argue on the basis of denying Assyrian continuity, claiming that the identity was a British invention and that Britain had begun identifying them with the ancient Assyrians for political purposes. Contenders for the identity also believe that after the fall of Nineveh, the ancient Assyrians became weak, and were assimilated into other ethnic groups; thus, the Assyrian ancestry of the group is minimal.

Disputes and arguments have also arisen surrounding the use of the endonym "Suraye/Suroye" and/or "Suryaye/Suryoye". Syriacist Assad Sauma Assad argues that although the endonym means Assyrian, it does not necessarily mean that the Suryoye are descended from them. Those who advocate for an Aramean identity, such as Johny Messo of the World Council of Arameans, contest that the endonym is synonymous with "Aramean" due its usage by the ancient Greeks to refer to those who spoke Syriac.

== Proposed compromises ==
=== Chaldo-Assyrian ===
"Chaldo-Assyrian" was a suggested compromise for Chaldean and Assyrian designations around the drafting of the Constitution of Iraq. The term began a modern resurgence in the 1970s and in 1996, the Communist Party of Kurdistan - Iraq became the first political party to use the term. In 2003, several political parties opted to adopt the name "Chaldo-Assyrian" for the people and "Syriac" for the language; most notably, the Assyrian Democratic Movement adopted the name in October after a meeting with Bishop Ibrahim. The name was adopted by a majority of votes in October 2003, with the chief objective being to legally adopt it as the best way to avoid external influence into the naming dispute.

The name was recognized for a short period of time by the Chaldean Catholic Patriarchate of Baghdad. Initially, the designation saw some favorable acknowledgement among Iraqi Assyrians cross-denominationally, but in the diaspora, the term was not unanimously accepted. According to an opinion article by Wilfred Bet-Alkhas, former editor of Zinda Magazine, religious feuds between the two churches and the lack of movement of the term amongst Chaldean groups in Detroit resulted in it never moving forward substantially. Professor at National University Shak Hanish, on the other hand, states that when the Chaldean church saw lack of movement of the term among Assyrian groups and political use of the term by the ADM, they rejected the term and insisted on Chaldean identity. Church leaders feared that the ADM would use the name to push for an autonomous region, favoring intergroup coexistence in the post-Saddam Iraq. A similar rejection was met by Chaldean political parties, and ultimately, the name was never adopted. The Transitional Administrative Law eventually settled on "Chaldeans and Assyrians", dividing the community into two sect-based communities and playing into divide and conquer strategies between Baghdad and Erbil.

=== Tri-name designation ===
A tri-name designation, which combines the contested labels into one common identifier (ie. Assyrian-Chaldean-Syriac), has been suggested and implemented as a compromise to the naming dispute in the past. From the late 2000s, the use of the designation became more popular, and was used in the 2000 U.S. Census as well. In 2008, Hanish stated that the use of the designation was the better option for the time, stating that it included all three identities without leaving out a particular group. Organizations affiliated with the Dawronoye, such as Suroyo TV and the European Syriac Union, have also utilized the tri-name designation to position itself in the middle of the dispute.

The tri-name designation has previously been rejected by Cardinal Sako of the Chaldean Catholic Church. He has also on more than one occasion called for political candidates to unite under a "Christian" list, which was unpopular among secular groups.

=== Endonyms ===
Previous attempts have been made to come to a compromise on the dispute by emphasizing the use of the endonym "Suraye/Suroye" and/or "Suryaye/Suryoye". During the naming conflict in Sweden, Ignatius Yaq'ub III encouraged church adherents to use the term "Suryoyo" as the name was used in traditional SOC environments, but it had not developed long-term currency in Sweden. Ignatius Aphrem II also insisted on the use of the term "Suryoye" as a unifying term. Certain studies, particularly in the Swedish context, have also relied on endonyms as neutral terms to describe the community. In addition, the term has also been used as a neutral terminology by Dutch journalists in Enschede and Hengelo.

Over time, controversies have arisen with the endonym as disputes over its meaning and what the word represents continue to arise from time to time. Certain issues with the endonym's legibility on a larger scale have also added to the term's controversy. Sociocultural anthropologist Sarah Bakker Kellogg, in a 2019 article on the Dutch Assyrian/Syriac community, noted that while research participants had no issues with the endonyms, controversies still persisted (namely for a meeting in the Netherlands) as there was no clear line between religion and ethnicity with how people used the label. She further stated under local conditions in the Netherlands, the term "Suryoyo" became increasingly legible as an ethnic term, but loses its legibility as the political ladder scales higher. Atto observed during research for her dissertation that some individuals objected to the use of the term, believing it would make the naming dispute more confusing for outsiders to understand. Meanwhile, some Assyrians (namely Chaldeans) use the word to designate a Christian background rather than ethnicity. (Note: In Sureth and Surayt, "Mshikhaya/Mshihoyo" exists as an established word meaning "Christian")

== Observations ==
=== Patterns of identity ===
Assyrian and Aramean identities differ by the amount of emphasis that is placed on politics or religion. Generally, those who identify as Assyrian are much more likely to be secular and political, whereas Aramean identity is emphasized by those who follow Christian traditions. However, religion is still observed to be playing a role in both secular Assyrian and Aramean identities, with differing views over its larger importance of maintenance. Generally, while Assyrian identity is present across all respective denominations, Aramean and Chaldean identities are limited to membership within the Syriac Orthodox and Chaldean Catholic churches, respectively. As of 2017, the majority of Syriac Orthodox Assyrians identified with Syriac/Aramean identity and traditions.

Donabed states that Chaldean identity is today mostly an Iraqi phenomenon and lacks saturation among the larger Chaldean Catholic community, including church members from Bohtan and Urmia. Expressions of the development of Chaldean identity have previously shown skepticism over its origins as a religious identity, which were shared by Ghassan Hanna Shathaya of the Chaldean National Congress. Shathaya stated in a personal interview that the party's failure to achieve notability reflected the sectarian nature and religious foundation of the identity, despite being formed to promote it, and for that reason, it would never properly emerge as an ethnic one.

Disputes about identity only predominately formed in the Western diaspora. Assyrians may identify under a certain label that is more common to a specific place in the diaspora. For instance, while members of the Chaldean church are more likely to identify as Assyrian in Chicago, they substantially identify under the Chaldean designation in Detroit and San Diego. In Sweden, Assyrians are observed using different identity labels depending on the context and purpose. Among proponents of Aramean identity, while some may argue for a complete separation of identities from the Assyrian one, it is not the case for the majority. Though some advocates may argue for inclusion of the Maronites as part of Aramean identity, others found efforts in a joint Aramean-Assyrian collaboration and identity. (Note: Wozniak-Bobinska observes this hybrid identity in the celebration of Kha b-Nisan by 41% of survey respondents, and the use of the Lamassu and Star of Ishtar) In some cases, Assyrians just emphasize their religion as opposed to ethnicity, linked to the impacts of the naming dispute.

A digital survey was prepared by Associate Professor Marta Wozniak-Bobinska at the University of Łódź in 2008, and was completed by 300 participants. 10% stressed the need for unity and cooperation, while 5% wished for the restriction of churches in their involvement with politics. All interviewees noticed the conflict surrounding the naming dispute. Wozniak-Bobinska later followed up on a survey studying those of the Aramean faction, which was completed by 306 participants. 2% of respondents mentioned disunity and the naming dispute as the biggest threat to Aramean identity, while 2.5% considered "the Assyrians" to be the greatest threat. In 2026, results of a community ethnic identity survey from three years prior were published by the Seyfo Center. The survey gathered 213 responses, and results were cross-tabulated based on variables such as location, identity, and church affiliation. Among participants, 47.8% believed that "Assyrian" was the most unifying identity name among six total choices, with "Suraye/Suroye" being listed by 29.6%. 85% of respondents agreed or strongly agreed that Assyrian, Chaldean, Syriac, and Aramean represented the same ethnic group.

=== External causes and church involvement ===
David Gaunt states that in one aspect, the naming dispute represents individual power struggles continued from the homeland, and a similar conflict likely would have existed in its place if not about identity. Part of the conflict is represented by preserving existing social structures from countries such as Turkey and Syria, and in itself represents a tension between tradition and modernity, primarily represented by church hierarchy. Murre-van den Berg identifies that other parts of the dispute have focused on tribalist clan conflicts, which play a role in choices between identities. Professor at Swedish Defence University Aryo Makko follows up on Gaunt's points, stating that for Arameanism, what originally resulted in opposition to Assyrian identity due to clerical power interests has since evolved into ongoing divisions, as well as the emergence of secular Aramean nationalism among younger advocates.

Discussions and criticisms of the dispute often focus on clergymen and the role that religious figures play in it. In the context of the dispute between Assyrian and Aramean identities, Atto and historian Andreas Schmoller observe that the Syriac Orthodox Church and its patriarch become the closest to an interconnecting figure between the rival factions. She states that Suryoye lay elite identifying as Assyrian elaborate better arguments for secular leadership than the Aramean faction, but in general, the lay elite are highly critical of the unquestioned authority given to clergymen. Kellogg noted how organizations such as the World Council of Arameans reaffirmed the stance of the Syriac Orthodox Patriarchate of Antioch in controlling the ethnic boundary placed on labels.

Additional criticisms are levied towards the churches and clergymen for fanning the flames of the naming dispute for personal interests. Dekelaita noted that the advocacy started by Jammo was inherited by Chaldean clergymen, including Sako, who despite saying that Chaldeans and Assyrians had no differences, began creating separate Chaldean political parties in an interest of power. Dekelaita stated that for Jammo and Ibrahim, the statement of representation was a budget issue; by stating that they had represented 80% of Iraq's Christians, dealings proceeded through the Chaldean clergy as opposed to the Assyrian Democratic Movement, the latter representing Assyrians cross-denominationally. He also implied that Ibrahim and Delly were aware of the unity between the two nomenclatures before they began making separatist remarks. Professor at Uppsala University Önver Cetrez states that in Europe and Sweden, the role of the churches has become increasingly problematic due to organizational structures inherited from the Middle East, which is based on, among other things, "contribution to ethnic-political division within the community."

Mark Tomass, a professor originally from the Assyrian/Syriac quarter of Aleppo, argues the identity conflict is not due to arguments of ethnic origin, but is instead the product of social and economic dynamics faced as a result of mounting persecution. He cites emphasis on religious identity over ethnicity (a common occurrence in the Middle East), as well as the Simele massacre, as examples of circumstantial events that demarcated self-identification among Assyrians from the 20th century. He states that from the 1980s, the Syriac Orthodox Church began to emphasize "Syriac" identity as a response to pressure from interrogations and harassment that community members faced by secret police in Iraq and Syria; simultaneously, clergymen offered Aramean identity as a means to protect the community from harassment and massacre in the Middle East.

== Legacy ==
=== Political marginalization ===
The naming dispute has been cited as a cause for hindered aspirations for forms of Assyrian autonomy or statehood, and is part of the failure of Assyrian nationalism to mobilize the community on a larger scale. The impacts of the naming dispute have reframed the aims of modern Assyrian activists to preserve identity and maintain a sense of being one people, especially as threats of assimilation continue to increase. Meanwhile, certain plans for Assyrian autonomy were hindered by the impacts of the naming dispute, with differences in denomination and linguistics having so far hindered Assyrians at a political level while paralyzing the community with frequent arguments.

The naming dispute has also been noted as being exploited in order to further divide the community and attain certain political benefits. In Iraq, Assyrian identity began to become more associated with the Church of the East (and later the Assyrian Church of the East) in religious and ethnic terms, while "Chaldean" and "Syriac" for their respective churches, thus continuing to urge their respective spiritual leaders to be the sole representatives of their adherents while fitting within the framework of Arabization. The vagueness of terms created by the separation of churches has been noted by German Orientalist Harald Suermann as opening the door to political instrumentalization, and Ba'athist policies of Arabization are cited as "casual and contributory factors in the hardening of otherwise ecclesiastical designations."

In a 2018 report by the Assyrian Policy Institute, the group noted several Assyrian parties that expressed sentiments of separatism and sectarianism, while receiving little to no support from Assyrians themselves, that had formed in the previous decade. Before the 2018 Iraqi parliamentary election, candidates that were part of the Chaldean Syriac Assyrian Popular Council were imposed on locals in towns that had a majority Chaldean Catholic, Syriac Catholic, and Syriac Orthodox population, encouraging them to vote for "one of their own". The report also noted that after 2003, several political parties (Chaldean Democratic Union Party, Syriac Assembly Movement, Chaldean League, etc.) only won elections via support through the Kurdistan Democratic Party, while church leaders such as Sako and those in the SCC supported or funneled the creation of separatist political parties to run in the 2018 elections. Chaldean separatism was also promoted by Rayan al-Kildani of the Babylon Movement, despite having no tangible relationship with Iraq's Assyrian community. The group wrote that the continued religious-based classification of Assyrians to define them in a political context was reminiscent of the legacy of Arabization under Ba'athist Iraq, and was deliberately imposed to dilute their ethnic identity.

=== Community fragmentation ===
An instance of naming-dispute motivated vandalism on the English Wikipedia page for Assyrians, dated October 7, 2014.

The issue of the naming dispute continues to remain deeply morally charged, centering around loyalty or disloyalty to a family, village, community, or Christianity. It has contributed to a deeper level of fragmentation often on a visibly social level, expanding into choices of church attendance, media to consume, names to use in reference to language, and overall identity crises. Organizations formed in diaspora that aimed to advocate for separate identities were founded with a lack of central authority that could compel belonging across denominations, and have since continuously contested the various ideologies of the naming dispute. In some cases, the dispute has even divided families, with members of the same family in Sweden differing between identifying as Assyrian or Aramean.

Often in attempts to distinguish themselves from each other, Assyrian vs Chaldean vs Aramean arguments introduce distinct and unique national heroes, days, symbols, and rituals to express collective identity, as well as differing views on culture, language, and music. Conflicts between names have carried over to online spaces since the rise of the Internet, often being a solidarity of denominational members with each other (ACOE with ACOE, Chaldeans with Chaldeans). Such conflicts have since become more widespread, as differing perceptions on the concept of identity have dominated the Assyrian community's internal discourse over several decades, with online communications making the dispute more visible and volatile than before. The conflict has routinely distracted from participation in cultural activities and has diverted the energy of community members into bitter internal strife.

In Sweden, the debate between Assyriska FF and Syrianska FC is often reflective of the naming dispute and the collectivization of modern Assyrian/Syriac identity as played out through football. The most notorious instance of dispute was in 1989, when during a local derby, fans of Syrianska ran onto the field and began attacking Assyriska players. Divisions have also been observed as forums for the two teams had also devolved into arguments over the naming dispute rather than about the actual teams themselves, alongside other mundane divisions and arguments over a potential merger. An incident of heightened criticism took place in 2009 when it was alleged that clergymen in the Syriac Orthodox Church rung a church bell in celebration of Syrianska's victory in a match.

==== Internalized Assyrophobia ====
The naming dispute has been a significant cause to the development of anti-Assyrian internalized racism. In recent times, certain clergymen in the Syriac Orthodox Church have supported an Aramean identity out of an anti-Assyrian stance. Said support has developed into a vocal and sectarian form of Assyrophobia. The same phenomenon has been observed with the Chaldean Catholic Church through support for a separate Chaldean identity. Anti-Assyrian tendencies among the non-COE communities to deny Assyrian identity have been documented since after the Simele massacre in 1933.

Several years after the establishment of Assyrian websites, declarations of Aramean identity appeared on the internet. The website Arameans of Aram-Nahrin described Assyrians as 'bandits', 'apostates', and 'criminals' committing spiritual genocide on the Aramean nation. Schmoller has also previously described the website as anti-Assyrian. Various strategies were used by the Syrianer to weaken the Assyrian movement by 'othering' them using negative attributions and labels, such as taudikat, yatume (Syriac: ܝܰܬ݂ܡܶܐ, lit. 'orphans'), shide (Syriac: ܫ̈ܶܐܕܶܐ, lit. 'devils'), or mqabel di 'ito (Syriac: ܡܩܰܒܶܠ ܕܺܝ ܥܺܝܕܬܐ, lit. 'anti-church').

In 2009, heightened disputes between Assyriska FF and Syrianska FC caused several violent incidents by Syrianska supporters, including the burning of the Assyrian flag, an arsonist attack, and the beating of an Assyriska player. A press release by Assyriska regarding the incident was condemned by the WCA (then the Syriac Universal Alliance) shortly after, describing the release as a "deplorable act" and politically motivated.

Before the 2018 Iraqi parliamentary elections, various secular Chaldean and Syriac politicians who ran on Assyrian lists reported receiving harassment from members of their churches because they identified as Assyrians. A Chaldean candidate's children were harassed and told their father was a race traitor. Members and supporters of both the Chaldean Coalition and the Syriac Assembly Movement were alleged to have used anti-Assyrian sectarian hate speech during campaigning, whereas hate speech in general had circulated online.

In 2024, Assyrian-American comedian Paul Elia spoke out about how he had received a death threat from the Chaldean owner of a home renovations company in Toronto before a scheduled performance for stating that Chaldeans are ethnically Assyrian. Elia, who is Chaldean himself, has previously been open about his Assyrian heritage and has lamented that Assyrians have splintered their ethnic identity and lack understanding of their ethnicity. He has also discussed how he began to feel more ostracized among Chaldo-Assyrians in Detroit after speaking out against the naming dispute.

=== Representation ===
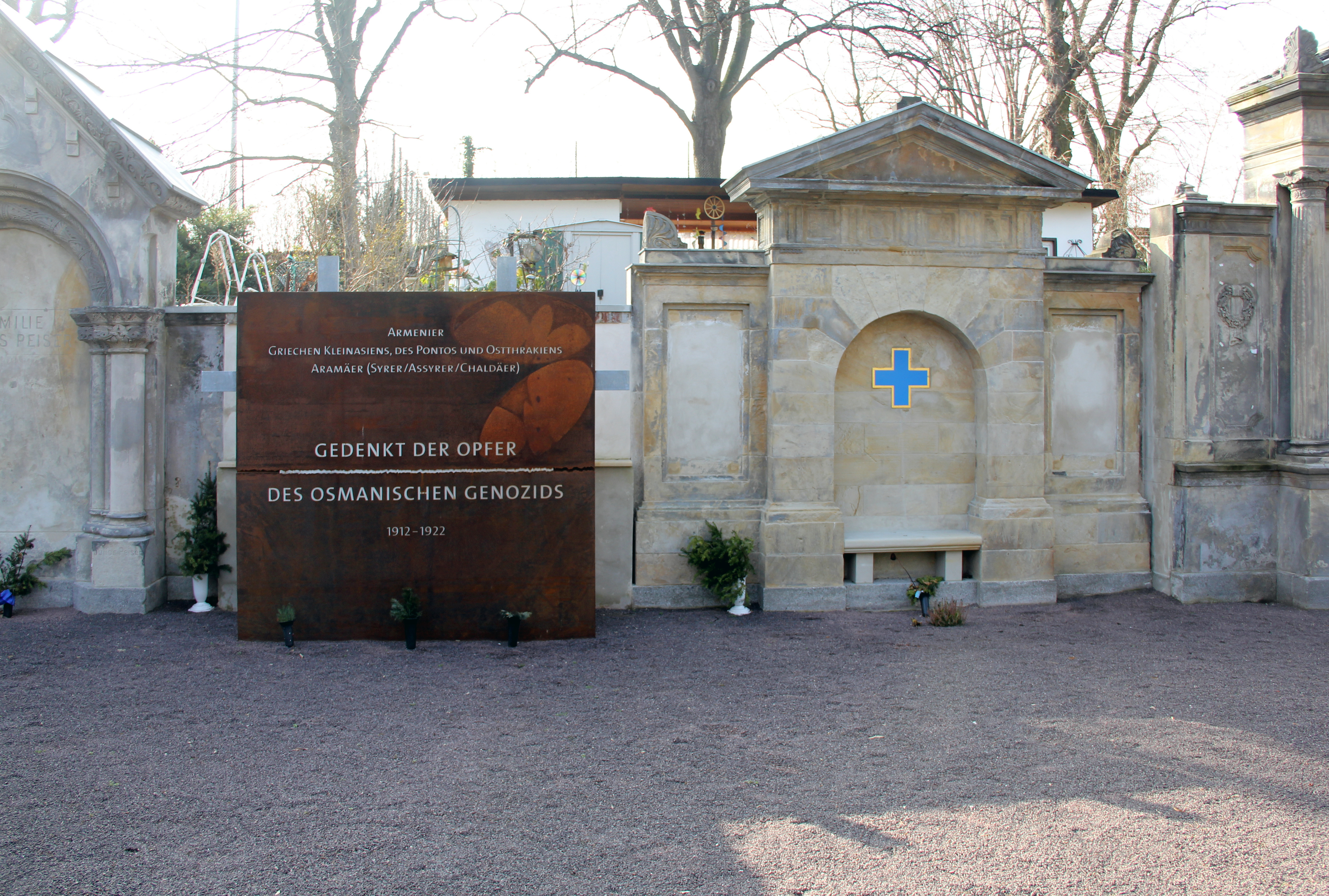
The "Oecumenical Memorial" of the three genocides in Berlin

The lack of representation in academic fields has often resulted in inaccurate or deliberately divisive information online (parallel to issues of repression), as long lasting effects of repression have fueled the naming dispute and its presence in diaspora and academia. In the case of the Syriac Orthodox, academic discourse has influenced the development of a cohesive identity among the community, though trends in scholarship as of 2009 were to dismiss Assyrian claims entirely, especially in Syriac studies. In a 2012 article, Donabed wrote how in various instances, writers discussing Iraqi Assyrian history compounded the issue of the naming dispute by misrepresenting and inaccurately tackling the identities and origins of Assyrians living in the country. He discussed these moves, alongside others, as part of the means of excluding Assyrians from academia and denying their continuity/identity.

In a research review of sources regarding Assyrian identity construction, Cetrez highlights that studies in Sweden have used different identity designations in different ways. He highlights that the choice of identity label in research contexts reflects a power-discourse of right or wrong, and that such choices may add to the division within the community. Cetrez, alongside Donabed and Mako, have criticized the definitions of Assyrians by their religious labels as a "reductionist fallacy", limiting Assyrian history to a religious dimension. Gaunt has stated that articles and publications that aim to support Assyrian or Aramean identities often become list of citations without cohesion, attracting little attention beyond those who already support either side of the naming dispute. Tomass highlights that community members across the different arguments for identity feel threatened by the various references to these identities, with this becoming a source of mental strain for clergymen, intellectuals, and ordinary laymen alike.

Continuous recognition of previous Assyrian history with different nomenclature has contributed to the hindrance of larger global awareness of it and the people, namely in the case of the Assyrian genocide. The impact of the ongoing naming dispute has hampered public recognition of the genocide, with confusion over who was actually killed and maintaining the historical divisions of the Ottoman millet system by compounding the various names used. Labeling Assyrians by their religious affiliation continued in order to diminish ethnic identity, and by extension, has resulted in a lack of scholarship/recognition of the Assyrian experience compared to the Armenian genocide until very recently.

Conflicts over how to recognize Seyfo have also permeated discussions of the genocide and the building of monuments. A monument in Sweden was unveiled in 2015 that memorialized the 100th anniversary of the Armenian, Assyrian, and Greek genocides as the "Centenary of the Genocides of the Armenians, Assyrians, Syriacs, Chaldeans and Hellenes.", while the "Oecumenical Memorial" in Berlin identified the victims as "Armenians, Hellenes of Asia Minor, Pontus and eastern Thrace, and Arameans (Syriacs, Assyrians, Chaldeans)." In 2023, the Enschede municipality stopped construction of a Seyfo monument after protests from the Dutch Turkish community, with the situation exacerbated by conflict over what names should appear on the monument.

== Bibliography ==
=== Books ===
- Aboona, Hirmis (December 2008). Assyrians, Kurds, and Ottomans: Intercommunal Relations on the Periphery of the Ottoman Empire (PDF). Cambria Press. ISBN 9781604975833.
- Atto, Naures (5 October 2011). Hostages in the Homeland, Orphans in the Diaspora: Identity Discourses Among the Assyrian/Syriac Elites in the European Diaspora (First published as dissertation, republished in a book format). Leiden University Press. ISBN 9789087281489.
- Baum, Wilhelm; Winkler, Dietmar (8 December 2003). The Church of the East: A Concise History. Routledge-Curzon. ISBN 9781134430192.
- Benjamen, Alda (19 January 2022). Assyrians in Modern Iraq: Negotiating Political and Cultural Space. University of California, Berkeley: Cambridge University Press. doi:10.1017/9781108976633. ISBN 9781108976633.
- Badger, George Percy (1852). "The Name "Chaldean"". The Nestorians and their rituals : with the narrative of a mission to Mesopotamia and Coordistan in 1842-1844, and of a late visit to those countries in 1850; also, researches into the present condition of the Syrian Jacobites, papal Syrians, and Chaldeans, and an inquiry into the religious tenets of the Yezeedees. Princeton Theological Seminary Library. pp. 177–181. ISBN 9780790544823.
- Donabed, Sargon (17 September 2015). Reforging a Forgotten History: Iraq and the Assyrians in the Twentieth Century. Edinburgh University Press. ISBN 978-0-7486-8605-6. JSTOR 10.3366/j.ctt14brxg2.
- Hanoosh, Yasmeen (2019). The Chaldeans : Politics and Identity in Iraq and the American Diaspora. Portland State University: Bloomsbury Publishing. doi:10.5040/9781788316675.ch-001. ISBN 9781788313698.
- Kiraz, George A. (2019). The Syriac Orthodox in North America (1895–1995): A Short History. Piscataway, NJ: Gorgias Press. ISBN 978-1-4632-4037-0.
- Knutsson, Bengt (1982). Assur eller Aram: språklig, religiös och nationell identifikation hos Sveriges assyrier och syrianer [Assur or Aram: linguistic, religious and national identification among Sweden's Assyrians and Syrians] (PDF) (in Swedish). Norrköping: Statens invandrarverk. ISBN 9170163863.
- Murre-van den Berg, Heleen (2000). Religieuze en etnische identiteit van Syrisch-Orthodoxen uit Turkije en Syrië in Nederland [Religious and ethnic identity of the Syrian Orthodox from Turkey and Syria in the Netherlands] (in Dutch). Leiden: Leiden University. pp. 144–162.
- Sengstock, Mary (1982). Chaldean Americans: Changing Conceptions of Ethnic Identity (PDF) (1st ed.). Wayne State University: Center for Migration Studies.

=== Book chapters ===
- Al-Jeloo, Nicholas (April 2019). "Continuing the Ottoman Millet System: The Othering of Assyrians as 'Christians' in Iraq". Discourses and Practices of Othering: Politics, Policy Making, and Media. Cambridge Scholars Publishing. pp. 112–121. ISBN 978-1-5275-9252-0.
- Atto, Naures (2014). "The Myth of an Ideal Leader: The Case of the Syriac Orthodox Community in Europe". In Hämmerli, Maria; Mayer, Jean-François (eds.). Orthodox Identities in Western Europe: Migration, Settlement and Innovation (1st ed.). Routledge. pp. 65–82. ISBN 9781138546172.
- Cetrez, Önver. A (2012). "Assyrian Identification as a Body of Power Politics: A Practice-Oriented Analysis". In Cetrez, Önver A.; Donabed, Sargon; Makko, Aryo (eds.). The Assyrian Heritage: Threads of Continuity And Influence. Acta Universitatis Upsaliensis. ISBN 9789155483036.
- Makko, Aryo (19 July 2017). "The Assyrian "concept of unity" after Seyfo" (PDF). In Travis, Hannibal (ed.). The Assyrian Genocide: Cultural and Political Legacies (1st ed.). London: Routledge. pp. 239–253. doi:10.4324/9781315269832. ISBN 9781315269832.
- Murre-van den Berg, Heleen (13 September 2013). "Light from the East (1948–1954) and the De-Territorialization of the Assyrian Church in the East". In Hofstee, Wim; van der Kooij, Arie (eds.). Religion Beyond Its Private Role in Modern Society. BRILL. pp. 115–134. ISBN 9789004257856.
- Murre-van den Berg, Heleen (2018). "Syriac Identity in the Modern Era". In King, Daniel (ed.). The Syriac World (PDF). pp. 770–782. doi:10.4324/9781315708195. ISBN 9781315708195.
- Murre-van den Berg, Heleen (2019). "Syriac Identity in the Modern Era". The Syriac World. London: Routledge. pp. 770–782. ISBN 978-1-138-89901-8. Archived from the original on 3 August 2023.
- Odisho, Edward Y. (2001). "The Ethnic, Linguistic and Cultural Identity of Modern Assyrians". Linguistic and Cultural Studies in Aramaic and Arabic. Gorgias Press. pp. 1–12. doi:10.31826/9781463218195. ISBN 9781463218195.
- Sato, Noriko (2018). "The memory of Sayfo and its relation to the identity of contemporary Assyrian/Aramean Christians in Syria". Sayfo 1915: An Anthology of Essays on the Genocide of Assyrians/Arameans during the First World War. Gorgias Press. pp. 305–327. ISBN 9781463207304. ISSN 1539-1507.
- Schmoller, Andreas (11 June 2018). "Of Safe Heavens and Sinking Ships: The Church in Oral Histories of Middle Eastern Christians in Austria". In Schmoller, Andreas (ed.). Middle Eastern Christians and Europe: Historical Legacies and Present Challenges. Salzburg: LIT Verlag Münster. ISBN 9783643910233.
- Schmoller, Andreas (20 September 2018). "Middle Eastern Minorities in Diaspora". In Rowe, Paul S (ed.). Routledge Handbook of Minorities in the Middle East (1st ed.). London: Routledge. doi:10.4324/9781315626031. ISBN 9780367580490.
- Tomass, Mark (2012). "Multiple Resource-Sharing Groups as Basis for Identity Conflict". In Cetrez, Önver A.; Donabed, Sargon; Makko, Aryo (eds.). The Assyrian Heritage: Threads of Continuity and Influence. Acta Universitatis Upsaliensis. ISBN 9789155483036.
- Wozniak-Bobinska, Marta (6 May 2020). "Far from Aram-Nahrin: The Suryoye Diaspora Experience". In Eamer, Allyson (ed.). Border Terrains: World Diasporas in the 21st Century. Brill. pp. 73–83. ISBN 978-1-84888-117-4.

=== Journal articles ===
- Andersson, Torbjörn (May–July 2009). "Immigrant teams in Sweden and the case of Assyriska FF". Department of Sport Sciences. Soccer & Society. 10 (3–4). Malmö University: 398–417. doi:10.1080/14660970902771456 – via Taylor & Francis.
- Armbruster, Heidi (2021). "Trajectories of Mobility: Intergenerational Narratives of Relocation and Achievement among Viennese Syriac Christian Men". Journal of Middle East and North African Migration. 8: 31. doi:10.24847/v8i12020.293. ISSN 2169-4435 – via Project MUSE.
- Armillei, Riccardo; Marczak, Nikki; Diamadis, Panayiotis (2016-10-01). "Forgotten and Concealed: The Emblematic Cases of the Assyrian and Romani Genocides". Genocide Studies and Prevention. 10 (2). ISSN 1911-0359.
- Clements, Henry (2019). "Documenting Community in the Late Ottoman Empire". International Journal of Middle East Studies. 51 (3): 423–443. doi:10.1017/S0020743819000369 – via Cambridge University Press.
- Dekelaita, Robert (1994). "On the Road to Nineveh: A Brief History of Assyrian Nationalism, 1892-1990". Journal of the Assyrian Academic Society. 8 (1): 6–30.
- Donabed, Sargon; Mako, Shamiran (1 September 2009). "Ethno-Cultural and Religious Identity of Syrian Orthodox Christians". Revue d'Histoire de l'Université de Balamand. ISSN 1608-7526 – via SSRN.
- Donabed, Sargon (December 2012). "Rethinking Nationalism and an Appellative Conundrum: Historiography and Politics in Iraq". National Identities. 14 (4): 407–431. Bibcode:2012NatId..14..407D. doi:10.1080/14608944.2012.733208. ISSN 1460-8944 – via Taylor & Francis.
- Frye, Richard (1992). "Assyria and Syria: Synonyms". Journal of Near Eastern Studies. 51 (4). University of Chicago Press: 281–285. doi:10.1086/373570. S2CID 161323237.
- Gaunt, David (9 December 2010). "Identity Conflicts among Oriental Christians in Sweden" (PDF). Sens Public. doi:10.7202/1064038ar. ISSN 2104-3272.
- Haar Romeny, Bas ter (1 January 2009). "The Formation of a Communal Identity among West Syrian Christians: Results and Conclusions of the Leiden Project" (PDF). Church History and Religious Culture. 89 (1): 1–52. doi:10.1163/187124109X407989. eISSN 1871-2428. ISSN 1871-241X. JSTOR 23932280 – via Brill.
- Hanish, Shak (16 March 2010) [Spring 2008]. "The Chaldean Assyrian Syriac People of Iraq: An Ethnic Identity Problem". Digest of Middle East Studies. 17 (1). University of Wisconsin-Milwaukee: 32–47. doi:10.1111/j.1949-3606.2008.tb00145.x. ISSN 1060-4367.
- Kellogg, Sarah Bakker (August 2019). "Perforating Kinship: Syriac Christianity, Ethnicity, and Secular Legibility". Current Anthropology. 60 (4): 475–498. doi:10.1086/705233. hdl:1874/386369 – via The University of Chicago Press.
- Kruczek, Gregory (10 March 2021). "Christian (Second-Order) Minorities and the Struggle for the Homeland: The Assyrian Democratic Movement in Iraq and the Nineveh Plains Protection Units". The Journal of the Middle East and Africa. 12 (1): 93–121. doi:10.1080/21520844.2021.1886521.
- Lundgren, Svante (2011). "Assyrier och/eller syrianer" [Assyrians and/or Syrians] (PDF). Finsk Tidskrift (in Swedish). 267–268: 21–31. ISSN 0015-248X.
- Lundgren, Svante (5 June 2024). "The Rise and Fall of Assyrian Nationalism" (PDF). Revue d'Histoire de l'Université de Balamand (45). University of Balamand: 53–65. Archived from the original on 5 June 2024.
- Makko, Aryo (2010). "The Historical Roots of Contemporary Controversies: National Revival and the Assyrian Concept of Unity". Journal of Assyrian Academic Studies. 24 (1): 58–86. Archived from the original on 8 July 2023.
- McClure, Erica; Kachru, Braj (2001). "Language and identity in the Assyrian diaspora". Diaspora, Identity, and Language Communities. University of Illinois. pp. 107–119.
- Gewargis, Odisho Malko (2002). "We Are Assyrians" (PDF). Journal of Assyrian Academic Studies. 16 (1): 77–95. Archived from the original (PDF) on 21 April 2003.
- Parpola, Simo (4 September 1999). "Assyrians after Assyria". Journal of Assyrian Academic Studies. 13 (2). University of Helsinki: 1–16. Archived from the original on 26 April 2008.
- Parpola, Simo (2004). "National and Ethnic Identity in the Neo-Assyrian Empire and Assyrian Identity in Post-Empire Times" (PDF). Journal of Assyrian Academic Studies. 18 (2). JAAS. Archived from the original (PDF) on 2007-11-28.
- Petrosian, Vahram (2006). "Assyrians in Iraq". Iran and the Caucasus. 10 (1): 113–147. doi:10.1163/157338406777979322. ISSN 1609-8498 – via JSTOR.
- Rommel, Carl (17 October 2011). "Playing with difference: football as a performative space for division among Suryoye migrants in Sweden". Soccer and Society. 12 (6): 850–864. doi:10.1080/14660970.2011.609684. eISSN 1743-9590. ISSN 1466-0970 – via Taylor & Francis.
- Schmoller, Andreas (2020). "The Syriac Orthodox and Coptic Orthodox Churches in Austria: Inter-Church Relations and State Recognition". Mashriq & Mahjar: Journal of Middle East and North African Migration. 8 (1). Moise A. Khayrallah Center for Lebanese Diaspora Studies: 76–102. ISSN 2169-4435.
- Suermann, Harald (8 September 2018). Thekeparampil, Jacob; Varghese, Baby; Hobbel, Arne (eds.). "Assyrians and Chaldeans in Iraq" (PDF). The Harp: A Review of Syriac, Oriental and Ecumenical Studies. 35. St. Ephrem Ecumenical Research Institute: 17–38. Archived from the original (PDF) on 12 September 2025.
- Wozniak-Bobinska, Marta (2011). "National and Social Identity Construction among the Modern Assyrians/Syrians". Parole de l'Orient. 36: 547–561.
- Wozniak-Bobinska, Marta (2015a). "The modern Arameans: in search for national identity". Parole de l'Orient. 40: 483–496. ISSN 0258-8331.
- Yildiz, Efrem (1999). "The Assyrians: A Historical and Current Reality". Journal of Assyrian Academic Studies. 13 (1): 15–30. Archived from the original on 27 February 2022.

=== Conference papers/lectures ===
- Boháč, Artur (1 April 2010). "Assyrian Ethnic Identity in a Globalizing World" (PDF). Beyond Globalisation: Exploring the Limits of Globalisation in the Regional Context. University of Ostrava: 67–72.
- Deniz, Fuat (25 August 2000). Maintenance and Transformation of Ethnic Identity: The Assyrian Case. Assyrians After Assyria Conference. Archived from the original on 19 April 2003.
- Donabed, Sargon (2017). "Neither "Syriac-speaking" nor "Syrian Orthodox Christians": Harput Assyrians in the United States as a Model for Ethnic Self-Categorization and Expression". In Teule, Herman (ed.). Syriac in its multi-cultural context : First International Syriac Studies Symposium, Mardin Artuklu University, Institute of Living Languages, 20-22 April 2012, Mardin. Peeters. pp. 361–372. ISBN 9789042931640.
- Wozniak-Bobinska, Marta (2015b). From Religious to Ethno-Religious: Identity Change Among Assyrians/Syriacs in Sweden (PDF). Comparative Approaches to Identity Change: Macro, Meso and Micro Perspectives. European Consortium For Political Research. Archived (PDF) from the original on 26 October 2019.

=== Theses ===
- Deniz, Fuat (1999). En minoritets odyssé: Upprätthållande och transformation av etnisk identitet i förhållande till moderniseringsprocesser : det assyriska exemplet (Doctoral thesis) (in Swedish). Uppsala University.
- Hanoosh, Yasmeen (2008). The Politics of Minority: Chaldeans between Iraq and America (PDF) (Doctor of Philosophy thesis). Ann Arbor: University of Michigan.
- Hughes, Erin (29 June 2016). An American atra? Boundaries of diasporic nation-building amongst Assyrians and Chaldeans in the United States (PhD thesis). The University of Edinburgh.
- Nordgren, Kenneth (September 2006). Vems är historien? Historia som medvetande, kultur och handling i det mångkulturella Sverige (PDF) (Thesis) (in Swedish). Umeå, Sweden: Umeå University. ISBN 9172641282.

=== Reports ===
- Golpashin, Elvin Envieh (Fall 2021). ISIS and the Assyrians: A Narrative Study of the Psychological Impacts of Intergenerational Trauma, Continuous Atrocity, and Collective Victimhood on the Assyrians (PDF) (Report).
- Hanna, Reine; Joseph, Max (27 November 2018). Iraq's Stolen Election: How Assyrian Representation Became Assyrian Repression (PDF) (Report). Assyrian Policy Institute.
- Lazar, Angela (6 February 2026). Ethnic Identity Survey Report: 2023 - Assyrian, Chaldean, Aramean, and Syriac (Report). Seyfo Center.

== See also ==
- Assyria
