= Ninos Aho =

Assyrian poet and activist (1945–2013)

- Born: April 24, 1945; Gerkeh-Shamo, Syria
- Died: July 15, 2013 (aged 68); San Pedro, Los Angeles
- Occupations: Assyrian Activist and Poet

Ninos Aho (Classical Syriac: ܢܝܢܘܣ ܐܚܐ; April 24, 1945 – July 15, 2013), was an Assyrian poet and activist. He is recognized one of the pioneers of the modern Assyrian nationalistic movement.

== Biography ==
Malfono Ninos Aho was born to an Assyrian family in the small village of Gerkeh-Shamo in Syria. He moved to Qamishli and later to Damascus in order to continue his studies. In 1971, Aho emigrated to the United States. After residing in the United States for twenty years, Malfono Ninos returned to Syria with his wife, Ogareet, and their four children in order to authentically promote his belief in the Assyrian cause. In 2001, Aho and his family returned to the United States when Aho was diagnosed with non-Hodgkin lymphoma, he died due to complications on July 15, 2013, in San Pedro, CA.

== Works and activism ==
Malfono Ninos Aho was involved in Assyrian nationalist activism at an early age. He joined the Assyrian Democratic Organization in 1961 during an underground assembly. In order to circumvent official crackdown on non-Arab nationalist sentiments he utilized his poems to be recited by local Syriac Orthodox church choirs in order to reach the public. He gained wider popularity after emigrating to the United States and his poems were performed by prominent Middle Eastern musicians such as Ninib A. Lahdo and Wadi al-Safi.

Most of his poems like ''Grain of wheat (ܚܒܬܐ ܕܚܢܛܐ, Ḥabṯo D'Ḥeṭo) were written in Western Syriac vernacular, while others like New Assyrian (ܐܬܘܪܝܐ ܚܕܬܐ, Āturāyā Khātā) in the eastern vernacular.
