= Gabriel Moushe Gawrieh =

Syrian engineer and politician (born 1962)

- ܓܒܪܐܝܠ ܡܘܫܐ ܓܘܪܝܐ

Member of the People's Assembly
- Incumbent
- Assumed office 1 July 2026
- Appointed by: Ahmed al-Sharaa

President of the Assyrian Democratic Organization
- Incumbent
- Assumed office 29 April 2023
- Preceded by: Daoud Daoud

Personal details
- Born: Gabriel Moushe Gawrieh; 1962 (age 63–64) Qamishli, Syria
- Party: Assyrian Democratic Organization
- Other political affiliations: Syrian National Coalition (2012–2025)
- Occupation: Agricultural engineer; activist; politician

Gabriel Moushe Gawrieh (Syriac: ܓܒܪܐܝܠ ܡܘܫܐ ܓܘܪܝܐ) is a Syrian agricultural engineer, activist, and politician who has served as a member of the People's Assembly since 2026. He has served as president of the Assyrian Democratic Organization since 2023.

== Early life ==
Gawrieh was born in Qamishli in 1962 to an Assyrian Syriac Orthodox family. He studied agricultural engineering at the University of Aleppo and graduated in 1982.

He joined the Assyrian Democratic Organization where he eventually became one of its leaders in the 2000s.

=== Role in the Syrian Civil War ===
During the initial phase of the Syrian Civil War Gawrieh called for a peaceful democratic transition of power voicing support for non-violent demonstrations. He was one of the leading secular figures of the Damascus Declaration, he however refused to join the leftist National Coordination Committee for Democratic Change.

Gawrieh was arrested by Syrian authorities in Qamishli on 19 December 2013. His arrest was condemned by Assyrian organizations, human rights organizations, as well as other countries such as the United States.

Gawrieh was released by Syrian authorities on 22 June 2016. His release was applauded by the Syrian National Coalition and numerous Assyrian organisations.

On 12 April 2017, an official in the Movement for a Democratic Society (TEV-DEM) met with Gabriel Moushe Gawrieh and discussed the closure of two Assyrian Democratic Organization offices since March. It was the first time TEV-DEM officials met with the ADO.

=== Post-Ba'athist Syria ===
Gawrieh was appointed as a member of the People's Assembly on 1 July 2026 by Syrian president Ahmed al-Sharaa.
