= Assyrian Democratic Organization =

Assyrian Democratic Organization ܡܛܟܣܬܐ ܐܬܘܪܝܬܐ ܕܝܡܩܪܛܝܬܐ المنظمة الآثورية الديمقراطية
- Logo of Mtakasto
- Leader: Gabriel Moushe Gawrieh
- Vice president: Bashir Isshaq Sa'di
- Founded: 1957
- Headquarters: Qamishli, Syria
- Ideology: Assyrian minority politics Minority rights
- National affiliation: Syrian National Coalition
- Colours: Light blue
- People's Assembly: 1 / 210

Website
- https://ado-world.com/en/

The Assyrian Democratic Organization (ADO; Syriac: ܡܛܟܣܬܐ ܐܬܘܪܝܬܐ ܕܝܡܩܪܛܝܬܐ; Arabic: المنظمة الآثورية الديمقراطية), also known as "Mtakasta/Mtakasto", is an Assyrian political party based in Syria. Founded in 1957, it is the oldest Assyrian political party in Syria, and was established as a national, political and democratic movement with the objectives of safeguarding the existence of the Assyrian people, as well as the realization of their legitimate national aspirations (political, cultural, administrative) in their historic homeland.

The Assyrian Democratic Organization faced many upheavals under the Assad family of Ba'athist Syria, including bans on its activity. The party is currently based in Qamishli as part of the Autonomous Administration of North and East Syria, and has been part of the Syrian National Coalition since October 2011. Currently, the ADO has around 5000 members, advocates for the formation of civil, secular Syrian state, and enjoys good relations with Western countries such as the United States.

== History ==
Founded in 1957 in the town of Qabre Ḥewore by university students and other intellectuals, the Assyrian Democratic Organization was founded with the hopes of having Assyrians federally recognized as a group under the Syrian government, as well as stressing unity of Assyrians across all denominations. The party was formed as a response to the developments of pan-Arabism in Syria, and increased pressure for Assyrians under Arabization campaigns and the formation of the United Arab Republic. The party espoused an ideology of secularism, and the origins of the party's thought can be linked to other prominent Assyrian nationalists such as Naum Faiq, Freydun Atturaya, Farid Nuzha, and Ashur Yousif. The party initially began as an underground movement amongst Assyrian communities, but over time, activities and celebrations became much more public. ADO utilized symbolism of the ancient Assyrians to stress continuity in Beth Nahrain, and aims to see an Assyrian homeland in the Middle East; the party's founding in Syria meant that greater room was given to promote Assyrian nationalism than under the Turkish government in Mardin and Tur Abdin.

The party's activities would eventually cause strain in politics and the Assyrian diaspora, which lead into a split between the names Assyrier and Syrianer in Sweden. In 1978, the party split into the Assyrian Democratic Party, led by Adam Homeh and stressed sectarianism through the belief of superiority of Eastern Assyrians over Western, who lead much of the ADO. The Aramean movement can be partially considered a reaction to ADO's secular ideology by the Syriac Orthodox Church, who stressed ties to religion as part of Syriac identity. Although the name debate began in 1975, the conflict was amplified by the 1980's with the death of Aslan Noyan; Noyan had allegedly planned to leak negative information on ADO to Swedish authorities, and many held the party accountable for his death. Eventually, the Swedish government would declare ADO a terrorist organization, and the party's leadership faced challenges with the ADP's pro-Ba'ath stance and candidates.

In 1998, ADO met with Vartan Oskanian, former Foreign Minister of Armenia, and the two parties met to discuss Armenian-Assyrian relations across history and the awareness of ADO among officials in the Armenian government. In the same month, the party condemned the French government and prime minister Lionel Jospin for avoiding the use of the word genocide in context of the Armenian genocide.

In 2005, ADO opposed the creation of the Constitution of Iraq following the 2003 invasion of Iraq. The opposition came as a result of the division of Assyrians into two distinct groups, namely "Assyrians" and "Chaldeans". In a statement released on August 31, ADO called for Assyrian organizations in the Assyrian homeland and diaspora to appeal to authorities in Iraq to undo the division and declare Assyrians as one sole ethnic group.

In 2010, ADO was stopped by Syrian security and prevented from holding a ceremony commemorating its anniversary.

== Syrian civil war and ISIS ==
After the outbreak of the Syrian Civil War, the ADO under the leadership of Gawrieh took a neutral stance on the conflict, calling for a peaceful resolution. Gawrieh had previously been one of the leading secular figures of the Damascus Declaration, he however refused to join the leftist National Coordination Committee for Democratic Change. ADO's involvement in the Syrian Civil War mediation talks set it apart from other parties due to its position as a minority political party, and its representation of Christian Assyrians in the Syrian landscape. However, in its course, the ADO began to take a stand against the Syrian regime and a routine of neighborhood watches, arming young Assyrians with weapons for protection. In The National News, Akkad Abdul Ahad, who ran the party's newsletter, stated "We are against the regime, but many Christians are afraid of change, of what comes after the regime, of who will rule Syria." ADO joined the Syrian National Council upon its founding in October 2011, being part of other opposition groups based in Istanbul.

The Assyrian Democratic Organization has been in opposition to the Sutoro police force during the fight against ISIS, as it is affiliated with the Asayish and the Syriac Union Party. The party was also subject to arbitrary arrest and detention by Syrian forces on more than one occasion; on May 20, 2011, the party's headquarters in Qamishly were raided, and 13 members were arrested after participating in a peaceful demonstration the previous day. A similar raid occurred two years later in 2013 by several militias aligned with the Syrian government.

On December 19, 2013, Gawrieh was arrested by Syrian authorities in Qamishli. His arrest was condemned by Assyrian organizations, human rights organizations, as well as other countries such as the United States. Hadi al-Bahra, then president of the coalition, condemned his arrest, stating that it would prevent any long-lasting political solutions to the Syrian Civil War. He was eventually released three years later, in June 2016.

In March 2017, two ADO offices in Qamishli and al-Malikiyah were shut down by Rojavan authorities due to a lack of a permit. On 12 April, an official in the governing Movement for a Democratic Society (TEV-DEM) met with Gabriel Moushe Gawrieh, head of the ADO, and discussed the incident and the "need to respect the laws of the administration". It was the first time TEV-DEM officials met with the ADO. Basheer al Saady, a member of the party, had previously discussed how continuous persecution had pressured Assyrians to leave Syria, stating how they had lost hope for a brighter future, especially after ISIS.

== Modern activity ==
In July 2020, the ADO joined an alliance of political parties called the Syrian Front for Peace and Freedom, which also included the Kurdish National Council, Syria's Tomorrow Movement, and the Arab Council in al-Jazeera and the Euphrates. In December of that year, ADO condemned a speech made by Bashar al-Assad at Al-Othman Mosque that espoused Arab nationalist sentiments. The ADO accused Assad of aiming to cause discord amongst Syria's ethnic and religious components, and put Assyrians at risk of further violence.

In 2021, Gawrieh, than the leader of ADO, was prevented from entering Iraqi Kurdistan by the AANES. Gawrieh had previously been banned from entering the region in July of that year, and he was scheduled to meet with the German consulate in Erbil. Despite the AANES aiming to push blame on the Kurdish Regional Government, the ADO condemned AANES for the dispute and called on authorities to reverse the ban and uphold the ideals of the administration.

In 2022, on the eve of Akitu, the ADO and the Syriac Union Party signed a Document of Political Understanding, which aimed to bolster mutual cooperation through recognizing the situation of Assyrians in Syria and the various names in use (Assyrian, Chaldean, Syriac). The agreement followed discussions between the two parties under US mediation, and was hailed as significant for preserving Assyrian communities in Syria despite threats of Kurdish reproachment. Gawrieh stated that the Document was a message to the Assyrian homeland and diaspora, and was commended by himself as well as Bashir Isshaq Sa'di and Sara Barsom of the Assyrian Women's Office.

In 2024, ADO participated in a webinar hosted by the Syrians for Truth and Justice Organization (STJ), in which Gawrieh condemned Turkish airstrikes on AANES and discussed the state of Assyrians in Syria due to the airstrikes, and how it impacted their presence in the country. Gawrieh had previously indicated fears that Turkish airstrikes could permanently alter demographics in the northeastern part of the country, and could create greater issues regarding property rights post-conflict.

In regards to the 2024 Syrian Parliamentary elections, the Assyrian Democratic Organization (ADO) have strongly rejected the elections given tensions surrounding President Bashar al-Assad. Gawrieh issued a statement arguing that "the holding of the general elections is not only against the constitution issued by the Syrian regime in 2011, but also to send a message to the international community and spread its legitimacy among the Syrian people. The demonstrations in Sweden and other areas are real proof of their rejection of the current regime in Damascus."

=== Post-Ba'athist rule ===
Following the Fall of the Assad regime in 2024, ADO made public postings on their social media accounts to mark the occasion. A video posted to their accounts showed Assyrians waving the Assyrian flag and the flag of the Syrian opposition, and emphasized their hope for a better future for Assyrians and all people in Syria. Gawrieh voiced confidence in what he saw as a turning point for the Syrian people and country.

Early into 2025, ADO issued a joint statement alongside the Syriac Union Party outlining their shared vision for the future of Syria, calling for a peaceful transition with a non-sectarian government as well as constitutional recognition of the Assyrian community, cultural and linguistic rights, and proper representation and restoration of Assyrian villages. However, on the occasion of Kha b'Nissan celebrations in Qamishli, the ADO lamented that results have so far been disappointing across the transitional period.

On 1 July 2026, Gabriel Moushe Gawrieh was appointed as a member of the People's Assembly by Syrian president Ahmed al-Sharaa.
