= Naum Faiq =

Assyrian poet and nationalist

Naum Elias Yaqub Palakh ܢܥܘܡ ܐܠܝܐܣ ܝܥܩܘܒ ܦܐܠܐܟ
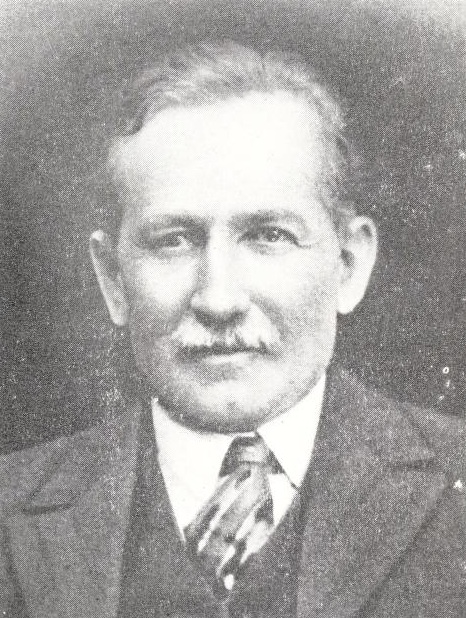
- Faiq, c. 1920s
- Born: February 1868; Diyâr-ı Bekr, Ottoman Empire (now Diyarbakır, Turkey)
- Died: February 5, 1930 (aged 62–63); New Jersey, United States
- Occupations: poet, journalist, teacher
- Movement: Assyrian nationalism

Naum Elias Yaqub Palakh (February 1868 – February 5, 1930), better known as Naum Faiq (Syriac: ܢܥܘܡ ܦܐܝܩ, Naˁum Fayëq), was an Assyrian poet, journalist, and teacher, remembered as one of the founding fathers of modern Assyrian nationalism during the early 20th century. He was a teacher and writer throughout his life. As a Syriac Orthodox Christian, he emphasized the importance of unity among Syriac Christians and encouraged his community to depart from "tribal mentality".

== Early life ==
He was born in Diyâr-ı Bekr (present-day Diyarbakır) in the Ottoman Empire and began his education there at the age of seven. After primary school, he attended the local high school that had been established by local "Brotherhood of Ancient Syrians". He spent 8 years at the school, where education was jointly in classical Syriac, Ottoman Turkish and Arabic. Naum also went on to learn several other languages, including Persian and basic French. After his parents died, he first lived with his older brother Thomas and then started teaching in a village near Diyarbakır in 1888. He also taught in Urfa, Adıyaman and Homs before returning to Diyarbakır.

== Literary works ==
Naum wrote numerous books concerning the Syriac language and people. After the 1908 Young Turk Revolution and the proclamation of the second Ottoman constitution, restrictions on freedom of speech were lifted. In 1910, Naum began publishing a newspaper for the Orthodox, Catholic and Protestant Syriac communities, entitled Kawkab Madnho ("Star of the East"). While written entirely in the Syriac alphabet, Star of the East was actually tri-lingual with articles in Ottoman Turkish, classical Syriac and Arabic. This newspaper, along with that of Ashur Yousif, signaled the emergence of Assyrian nationalism in the Syriac Christian communities of the Ottoman Empire.

After the Ottoman Empire and Italy began to fight over the province of Libya in 1911, Naum like other Christians in the region felt a backlash from the Muslim community and in 1912, he fled to United States, where he began to write for the newspaper Intibah ܐܢܬܒܗ (Cirutho ܥܝܪܘܬܐ, in English: Awakening), published by Gabriel Boyaji from 1909-1915. He went on to establish various Assyrian newspapers including Beth-Nahrin in 1916 and became the head of the editorialship of Huyodo, a magazine that is still published today under the same name in by the Assyrian Federation in Sweden.

== Death ==
The death of his wife in 1927 affected Naum very much. He died in New Jersey in 1930 due to lung disease. "Naum Faiq" day is celebrated yearly on February 5. Ceremonies are usually held in Syria, United States, and in various European nations.

== Poems ==
=== Awake, son of Assyria ===
His most famous poem is titled "Awake, son of Assyria, awake!" (ܐܬܬܥܝܪ ܒܪ ܐܬܘܪ ܐܬܬܥܝܪ).

:Awake, son of Assyria,

Awake and see the world how enlightened.
The chance is fleeing from us
And time is running out
Awake son of Assyria, Awake!
In vengeance you will take refuge.
Rise up and band together to strengthen.
And if one does not awake we have lost our chance
Without a purpose, misfortune will befall our land.

— Naum Faiq

=== Homeland ===
:Did our hearts become of stone

Did our hearts become of iron
Or did our eyes become blind
Let our red blood flow
Let our silent hearts whine
Let the Assyrian youth always say
Oh, are there still any catastrophes which we haven't gone through yet
From the moment that we came to this world
From the womb till our grave we cannot keep our homeland out of our minds
The only thing I desire from the Lord
Is that He will not take away my soul until I have seen you...homeland.

— Naum Faiq

== See also ==
- Farid Nuzha
- Assyrian nationalism
- List of ethnic Assyrians
