= Assyrian nationalism =

Social movement

Assyrian flag, adopted in 1968.

Assyrian nationalism, sometimes known as Assyrianism, is a movement among the Assyrian people that advocates for their independence or autonomy in the historic Assyrian heartland in northern Mesopotamia, in what is today northern Iraq, northeastern Syria, southeastern Turkey, and northwestern Iran.

The Assyrian people culturally and demographically descend from the ancient Mesopotamian Bronze Age civilisation of Assyria, which was centred on the cities of Ashur and Nineveh and at its height conquered most of West Asia, with multiple empires controlling from Egypt, the Levant, Anatolia, the Arabian Peninsula, Armenia, Azerbaijan, and Iran from its heartland in northern Mesopotamia. The Assyrian empire lasted from perhaps as early as the 25th-century BC until its collapse around 7th-century BC.

The movement emerged in the late 19th century in a climate of increasing ethnic and religious persecution of the Assyrians in the Ottoman Empire, and is today commonly espoused by Assyrians both in the Assyrian diaspora and Assyrian homeland.

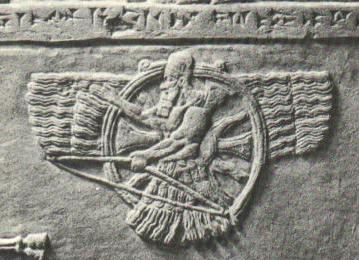
The Assyrian relief of Ashur as a feather. This is one of the best-known symbols used by the people of ancient Mesopotamia in general, and Assyrians in particular.

The Unrepresented Nations and Peoples Organization (UNPO) recognises Assyrians as an indigenous people of northern Iraq, southeastern Turkey, northeastern Syria and the fringes of northwestern Iran, as does the Political Dictionary of the Modern Middle East.

The movement is widely considered a failure or not yet successful due to the Assyrian genocide, widespread opposition by ethnic Assyrians across denominational lines for a variety of religious, tribal, political, and survival reasons, and a failure to bring about Assyrian autonomy or independence.

== Ideology ==
The ideology of Assyrian nationalism is based on the political and national unification of ethnic Assyrian followers of a number of Syriac Christian churches (mainly those originating in, or based in and around Upper Mesopotamia) with classical, Akkadian-influenced Syriac (Suret) as its cultural language and Eastern Aramaic dialects as spoken tongues. Its main proponents in the late 19th-century and early 20th-century were Naum Faiq, Freydun Atturaya, Ashur Yousif, Malik Khoshaba and Farid Nuzha.

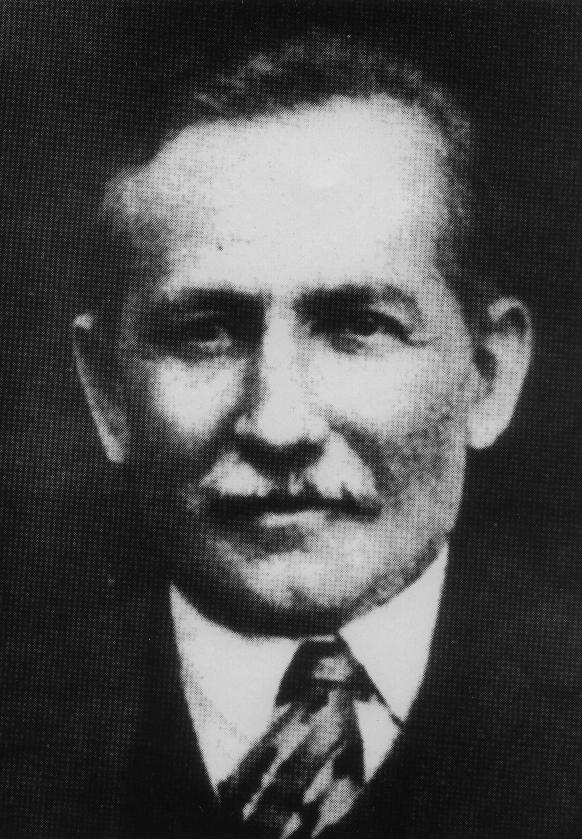
Naum Faiq

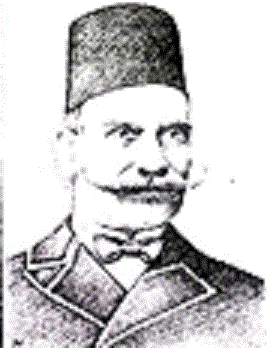
Ashur Yousif

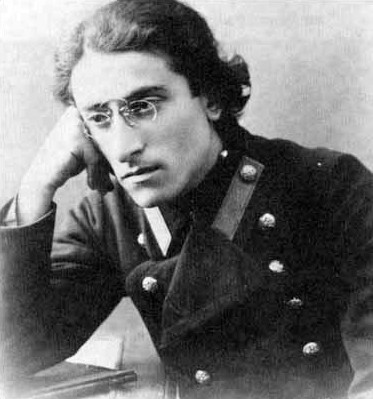
Freydun Atturaya

Assyrians did not always act collectively, but were involved in secular and left-leaning political movements that emphasised socioeconomic justice, minority rights, and Assyrian interests.

Within the Syriac Christian population in the near east as a whole, 'Assyrianism' is confined specifically by certain geographic, ethnic, linguistic and confessional boundaries. Geographically and linguistically, an 'Assyrianist' position is held by those who speak Eastern Aramaic dialects or live in the historic Assyrian heartland and demographically and culturally descend from the ancient Assyrians.

Theologically, the position is a little more complex. Followers of the Assyrian Church of the East, Ancient Church of the East, Chaldean Catholic Church, Assyrian Pentecostal Church and Assyrian Evangelical Church usually adhere to an Assyrianist position, although sometimes the term Chaldo-Assyrian is used.

Members of the Chaldean Catholic Church should not be confused with the ancient Chaldeans, an extinct Semitic ethnic group which migrated to southern Mesopotamia from the Levant during the 9th-century BC, were assimilated and adopted native Mesopotamian culture (including language, practices, and religion) and played key roles in Babylonian and Assyrian history and dynastic conflicts before going extinct during the 6th-century BC following the conquest of Babylon by the Achaemenid Empire. The name 'Chaldean' would later come to refer to a Babylonian, a Mesopotamian, or the land of southern Mesopotamia, as well as be used interchangeably throughout history with 'Assyrian' as an ethnic name for the Assyrian people. It was for this reason that it ended up as the name of the Chaldean Catholic Church in 1552.

Eastern Aramaic-speaking populations who follow the Syriac Orthodox Church and Syriac Catholic Church who live or descend from those who lived in northern Iraq, northeastern Syria, southeastern Turkey, northwestern Iran and the southern Caucasus tend to regard themselves as Assyrian, whereas formerly Western Aramaic-speaking and now almost exclusively Arabic-speaking Levantine members of these churches from the rest of Syria, Lebanon and south-central Turkey often espouse an Aramean, Phoenician (more common among Maronite Christians) or even Greek heritage (see Arameanism and Phoenicianism).

This is in part due to the term Syriac being generally accepted by the majority of scholars to be a 9th-century BC derivation of Assyrian, which for many centuries was used in specific and sole relation to the Assyrians and Assyria, and in part because the majority of the Christian population of these areas are not geographically or demographically from what was Assyria or Mesopotamia, and thus do not identify with an Assyrian heritage or descent as the pre-Arab, pre-Islamic Mesopotamian Assyrians from Iraq, Syria, Turkey, Iran and the Caucus do.

According to Raif Toma, Assyrianism goes beyond mere Syriac patriotism, and ultimately aims at the unification of all "Mesopotamians", properly qualifying as "Pan-Mesopotamianism". This variant of Assyrianism is independent of Christian, ethno-religious identity and qualifies as a purely ethnic nationalism, in that it identifies the Assyrian people as the heirs of the Assyrian Empire, and as the indigenous population of Mesopotamia, as opposed to Arabism, which is identified as a chronologically later, non-indigenous, and foreign intrusive element. This is expressed for example in the Assyrian calendar introduced in the 1950s, which has as its era 4750 BC; then thought to be the approximate date of construction of the first temple to Ashur.

Organizations advocating Assyrianism are the Assyrian Democratic Organization, Bet-Nahrain Democratic Party, Assyrian Universal Alliance (since 1968) and Shuraya (since 1978). The Assyrian flag was designed by the Assyrian Universal Alliance in 1968.

Mordechai Nisan, the Israeli Orientalist, also supports the view that Assyrians should be named specifically as such in an ethnic and national sense, are the descendants of their ancient namesakes, and denied self-expression for political, ethnic and religious reasons.

Dr. Arian Ishaya, a historian and anthropologist of UCLA, states that the confusion of names applied to the Assyrians, and a denial of Assyrian identity and continuity, is on one hand borne out of 19th- and early 20th-century imperialism and condescension on the part of the west, rather than by historical fact, and on the other hand by long-held Islamic, Arab, Kurdish, Turkish and Iranian policies, whose purpose is to divide the Assyrian people along false lines and deny their singular identity, with the aim of preventing the Assyrians having any chance of unity, self-expression and potential statehood.

Naum Elias Yaqub Palakh (better known as Naum Faiq), a 19th-century advocate of Assyrian nationalism from the Syriac Orthodox Church community in Diyarbakır, encouraged Assyrians to unite regardless of tribal and theological differences.

Ashur Yousif, an Assyrian Protestant from the same region of southeastern Turkey as Faiq, also espoused Assyrian unity during the early 20th century, stating that the Church of the East, Chaldean Catholic and Syriac Orthodox Assyrians were one people, divided purely upon religious lines.

Freydun Atturaya (Freydon Bet-Abram Atoraya) also advocated Assyrian unity and was a staunch supporter of Assyrian identity and nationalism and the formation of an ancestral Assyrian homeland in the wake of the Assyrian genocide.

Farid Nuzha, an influential Syrian-born Assyrian nationalist, was deeply critical of the leaders of the various churches adhered to by Assyrians, accusing the Syriac Orthodox Church, Assyrian Church of the East, Chaldean Catholic Church and Syriac Catholic Church of creating divisions among them and advocating that their joint ethnic and national identity should be paramount.

== Independence movement ==
The ideology of Assyrian independence is a political movement that supports the creation of Assyria as a nation-state corresponding to part of the original Assyrian homeland, in the Nineveh Plains of northern Iraq and other areas in the Assyrian homeland. The issue of Assyrian independence has been brought up many times throughout the course of history from before World War I to the present-day Iraq War. The Assyrian-inhabited area of Iraq is located primarily but not exclusively in the Nineveh Governorate region in northern Iraq where the ancient Assyrian capital of Nineveh was located. This area is known as the "Assyrian Triangle." Assyrians are generally found all over northern Iraq, including in and around the cities of Mosul, Erbil, Kirkuk, Dohuk, Amedi and Rawandiz, and there are a large number of exclusively Assyrian towns, villages, hamlets and agricultural communities in the north, together with others that have significant Assyrian populations. Other communities exist over the borders in southeastern Turkey (Mardin, Diyarbakır, Harran, Bohtan, Kültepe, Hakkari), northeastern Syria (Al-Hasakah, Qamlishi Khabur delta) region and northwestern Iran (Urmia).

In post-Ba'thist Iraq, the Assyrian Democratic Movement (or ADM) was one of the smaller political parties that emerged in the social chaos of the occupation.

== Symbols ==
Shamash sun symbol, which was used in ancient Mesopotamia. This iconography later gave rise to the Assyrian flag which was adopted in 1968.

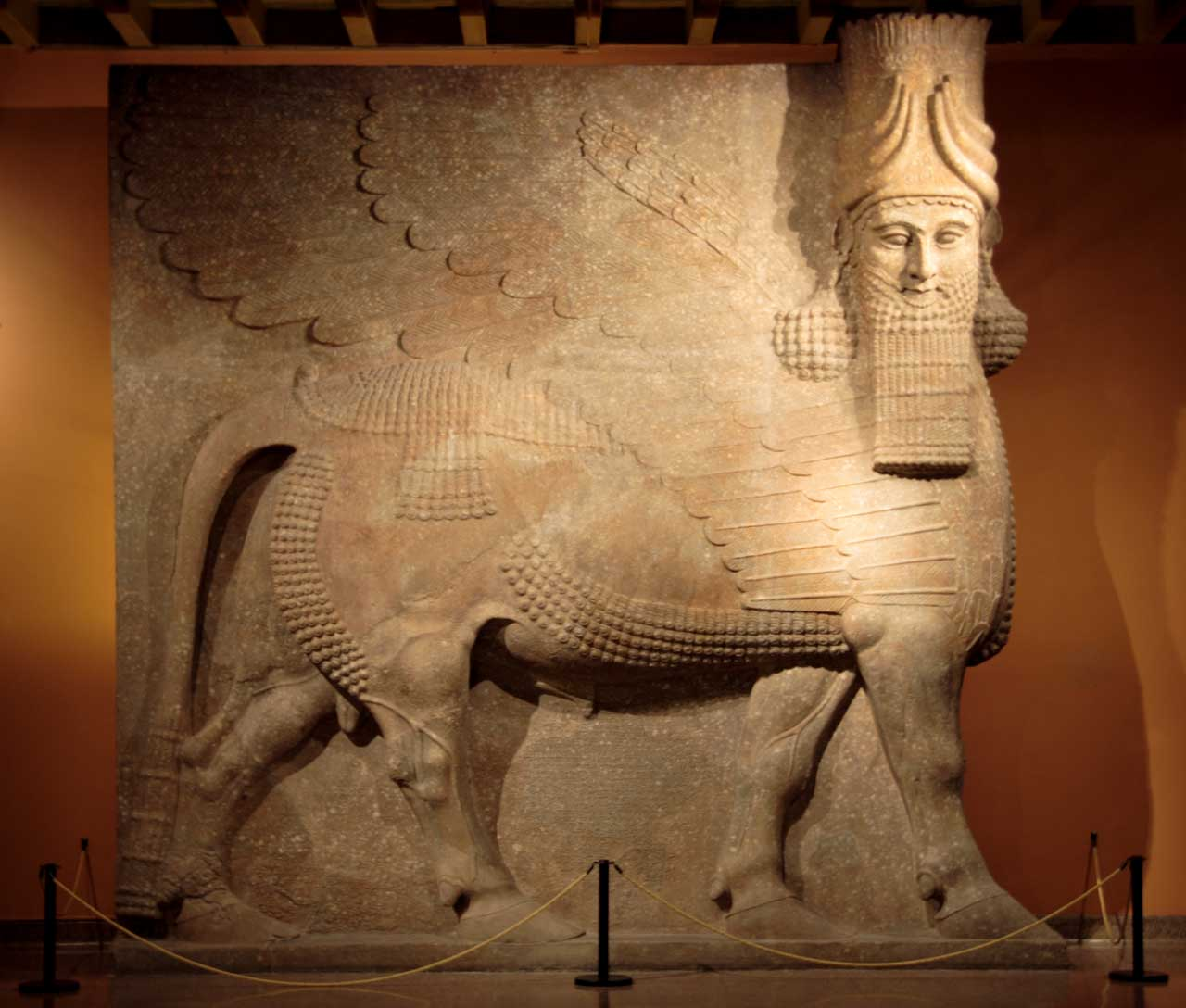
Initially depicted as a goddess in Sumerian times, when it was called Lamma, it was later depicted from Assyrian times as hybrid of a human, bird, and either a bull or lion under the name Lamassu. It appears frequently in Mesopotamian art.

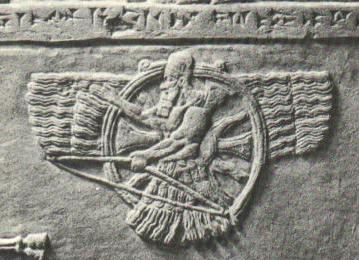
A Neo-Assyrian relief of Ashur as a feather robed archer. It appears on the Assyrian flag.

Emblem of Nineveh Plain Protection Units

== See also ==
- Armenophile
- Assyrian flag
- Assyrian Socialist Party
- Assyrian Universal Alliance
- Dawronoye
- Diaspora nationalism
- Freydun Atturaya
- Nationalism and ancient history
- Naum Faiq
- Assyria
- Iraqi nationalism
- Pan-nationalism
- Philhellenism
- Zionism

== Sources ==
- Düring, Bleda S. (2020). The Imperialisation of Assyria: An Archaeological Approach. Cambridge: Cambridge University Press. ISBN 978-1108478748.
- Liverani, Mario (2017). "Thoughts on the Assyrian Empire and Assyrian Kingship". In E. Frahm (ed.). A Companion to Assyria. Hoboken: John Wiley & Sons. pp. 534–546. ISBN 978-1118325247.
