= Ashur Yousif =

Assyrian nationalist figure (1858 – 1915)

Ashur Yousif Afendi
- ܐܫܘܪ ܝܘܣܦ ܐܦܢܕܝ
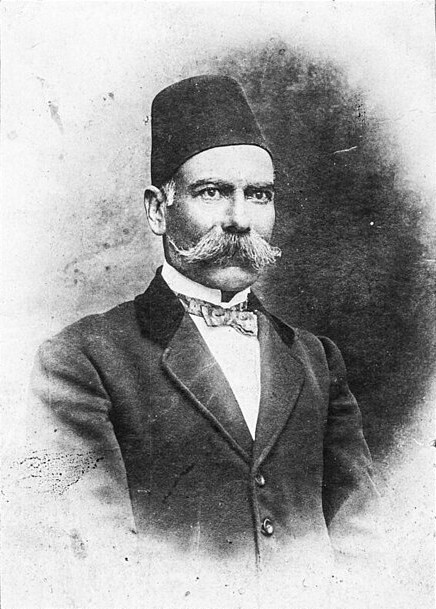
- Portrait of Yousif in the 1910s
- Born: 1858; Elazığ, Ottoman Empire
- Died: June 23, 1915 (aged 56–57); Diyarbakır
- Occupation: Writer
- Known for: Assyrian nationalism

Abraham Yousif, better known as Ashur Yousif (Yousef) or Ashur Yousif Afendi (Syriac: ܐܫܘܪ ܝܘܣܦ ܐܦܢܕܝ, romanized: Ašur Yousep Afendi) (1858 – June 23, 1915), was an Assyrian professor and intellectual prior to World War I and the Assyrian genocide. He was Protestant, as was his wife Arshaluys Oghkasian, the daughter of an Armenian Protestant minister.

Yousif was one of the earliest casualties of the Assyrian genocide, when he and his brother Donabed were arrested alongside other Assyrian leaders and killed. He has since become known as one of the strongest and earliest advocates of Assyrian nationalism.

== Early life and career ==
Yousif was born to a prosperous Syriac Orthodox family in 1858 in Elazığ (Harput). He pursued education from an early age, and later moved to Constantinople (modern day Istanbul) where he earned an advanced degree in education.

He studied at (but did not graduate from) the Central Turkey College in Antep, and later became a professor of Classical Armenian language at the Euphrates College in Harput. It was at the college where he would later meet his future wife, Arshaluys Oghkasian.

Yousif was one of the earliest advocates of Assyrian nationalism, calling for national unity and expressing disdain towards sectarianism and exclusive identities. In 1910, he published a bilingual Arabic-Syriac newspaper titled Murshid al-Athuriyyin ("Advisor of the Assyrians"), discussing literature, religion, history, etc. In the magazine, Yousif expressed his concerns over the lack of educated Assyrian leaders and political organization, as well as many debilitating fights between various church organizations and religious divides, as partly the reason for the lack of nationalistic sentiment among Assyrians.

His writings on Assyrian identity and independence intensified leading into the mid-1910s, and he often decried the lack of political organization compared to the Armenian national movement. In many of his writings, Yusuf criticized clergy of the church as a cause of the community's need for reflection on its failures. He also criticized the dangers of a lack of awareness of Assyrian history, stating that knowing such history would foster questions of communal identity; such writings often placed him at ends with the Syriac Orthodox Church, which took internal steps to control nationalist discourse.

Aside from his work on Murshid al-Athuriyyin, Yousif also authored a two-volume manual on Classical Armenian and composed poems in Armenian and Turkish.

== Death ==
Yousif, along with other Assyrian leaders from the town of Harput, were arrested in 1915. In a final letter that he wrote to his brother Hanna, Yousif described how much of his work was now left unfinished with the coming of his execution, but ended the letter on a hopeful note for defending Assyrians in front of God.

Differing accounts exist for how Yousif was killed during the Assyrian genocide. In one account, he was tortured and then hanged in a prison in Diyarbakır, while a memorial from the Assyrian Five association published in 1919 stated he was driven out to a death march and massacred by a number of hired Kurds. Additionally, accounts of his arrest date differ between April 19th and May 1st in the same year, and there are suggestions that the letter written to his brother was fake. He would later be executed in late June.

== Legacy ==
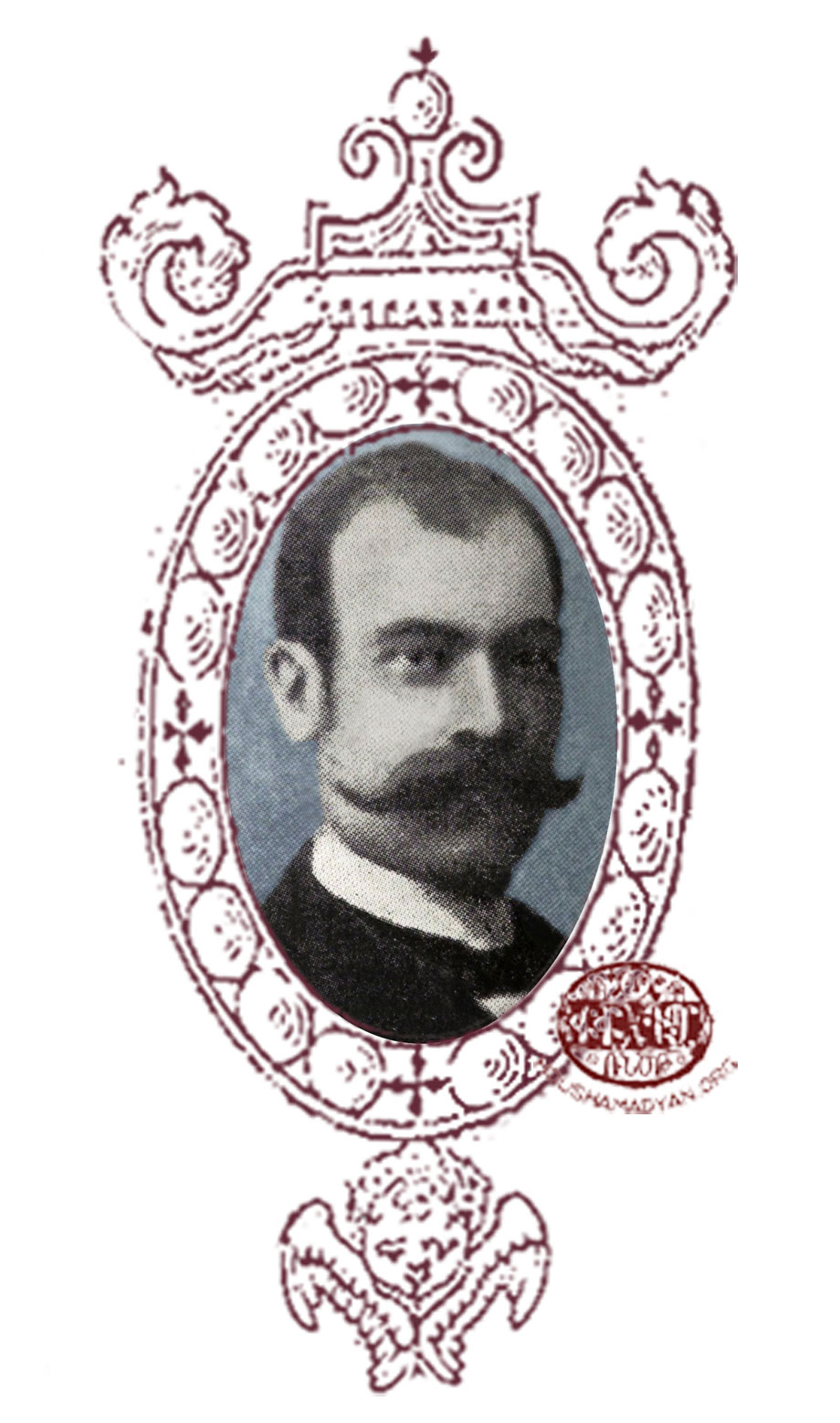
Framed picture of Ashur Yousif

Today, Yousif is remembered as one of the strongest and earliest advocates of Assyrian nationalism and a unified Assyrian people that transcended denominational boundaries. Much of Yousif's writings were destroyed during the Assyrian genocide, but they would serve as inspiration for other Assyrians such as David Barsum Perley. He would later be revered among Assyrians cross-denominationally and viewed as an icon by writers in Iraq and Iran, as he was the first Assyrian journalist to have been martyred.

Yousif was memorialized in a poem by Sanharib Baley, another Assyrian activist, after his death. His wife Arshaluys would later found an orphanage and his family would settle between Armenia and the United States. Many books have since been written about Yousif, especially by his descendants. In 1965, Yousif's daughter, Alice Nazarian, published a book in Armenian that describes the story of Yousif's life and that of his wife after his death. The book was later translated into English by the Swedish-Assyrian publisher "Nineveh Press", with added materials and an updated genealogy of Yousif's descendants.

On June 24, 2006, Ashur Yusef's great-grandson Tigran Hovsepyan gave an emotional speech at the "Assyrian Society of UK" regarding the Assyrian genocide and praised UK politicians Councillor Mike Elliot and Stephen Pound MP for their efforts on the issue.

== Quotes ==
"The second reason for this backwardness is the internal sectarian disputes in the church. The hindrance to the development of the Assyrians was not so much the attacks from without as it was from within – the doctrinal and sectarian disputes and struggles, like monophysitism and dyophysitism. These caused divisions, spiritually and nationally, among the people who quarrelled among themselves even to the point of shedding blood, thus creating a permanent schism. These dissensions sapped the physical and moral energy of the people and destroyed the sources of light, namely, the promising educational institutions. The church and the people were split up for centuries and still remain Nestorians, Melekites, Maronites, Atigs (‘atiq ‘old’) and Jedids (‘new’). Today it is the same stupid phenomenon that is revealed in India as a result of the improvident attitude of the present Patriarch. "

"To attain cultural development and progress among the Assyrians, both as individuals and as a people, it is necessary to have the highest ideal in life and to seek to realize it. And to reach this goal, families also must bring forth children with a Christian and national character who will serve the nation; and schools must produce leaders. The church and the clergy should revive the pulpit, and with fiery language and divinely inspired message extol the life of the soul. And the wheels of the press should grind out newspapers and books to promote the intellectual, spiritual, and national life of the Assyrians. Let family, church, school, and press unite in this spirit, cooperate and render mutual assistance, for it is only then that this nation, which has embarked on the journey to self enlightenment, will attain the supreme ideal in life, which it must of necessity pursue."

== Bibliography ==
- Akopian, Arman (4 March 2020) [1 January 2010]. "Babylon, an Armenian-language Syriac Periodical: Some remarks on Milieu, Structure and Language". Journal of the Canadian Society for Syriac Studies. 10 (1). Yerevan State University: 83–98. doi:10.31826/jcsss-2010-100107. ISBN 9781463201388.
- DeKelaita, Robert. The Origins and Development of Assyrian Nationalism (PDF) (MA thesis). University of Chicago.
- Donabed, Sargon; Mako, Shamiran (27 July 2011). "Harput, Turkey to Massachusetts: Immigration of Jacobite Christians". Revue d'Histoire de l'Université de Balamand. 23: 19–42. doi:10.2139/ssrn.1895722. ISSN 1608-7526. SSRN 1895722.
- Gaunt, David (1 November 2020). "The Long Assyrian Genocide". Collective and state violence in Turkey : the construction of a national identity from empire to nation-state. Berghahn Books. pp. 56–96. doi:10.2307/j.ctv29sfvw6.6. ISBN 9781789204513.
- Sims, Michael (2023). ‘Without a Purpose, Misfortune Will Befall Our Land:’ Discourses of Nation in Late Ottoman Kurdistan (Thesis). University of Washington.
