= List of ethnic Assyrians =

The following is a list of notable Assyrians.

== Activists ==
- Ninos Aho – poet and founding father of modern Assyrian nationalism
- Freydun Atturaya – physician, poet and founder of the first Assyrian political party, the Assyrian Socialist Party
- Naum Faiq – writer, poet and founding father of modern Assyrian nationalism
- Jumana Hanna – involved in anti Baath war propaganda, torture victim
- Nuri Kino – award-winning journalist, documentary filmmaker, author, human rights expert, and founder of A Demand for Action
- Rosie Malek-Yonan – actress, author, director, public figure and human rights activist
- Hurmiz Malik Chikko – martyr and leader of the Assyrian armed struggle against the Ba'ath regime in Iraq in the late 1950s – early 1960s
- Farid Nuzha – journalist and founding father of modern Assyrian nationalism
- David Barsum Perley – philosopher and nationalist
- Juliana Taimoorazy – founder and president of the Iraqi Christian Relief Council, senior fellow at the Philos Project

== Actors, directors and entertainers ==
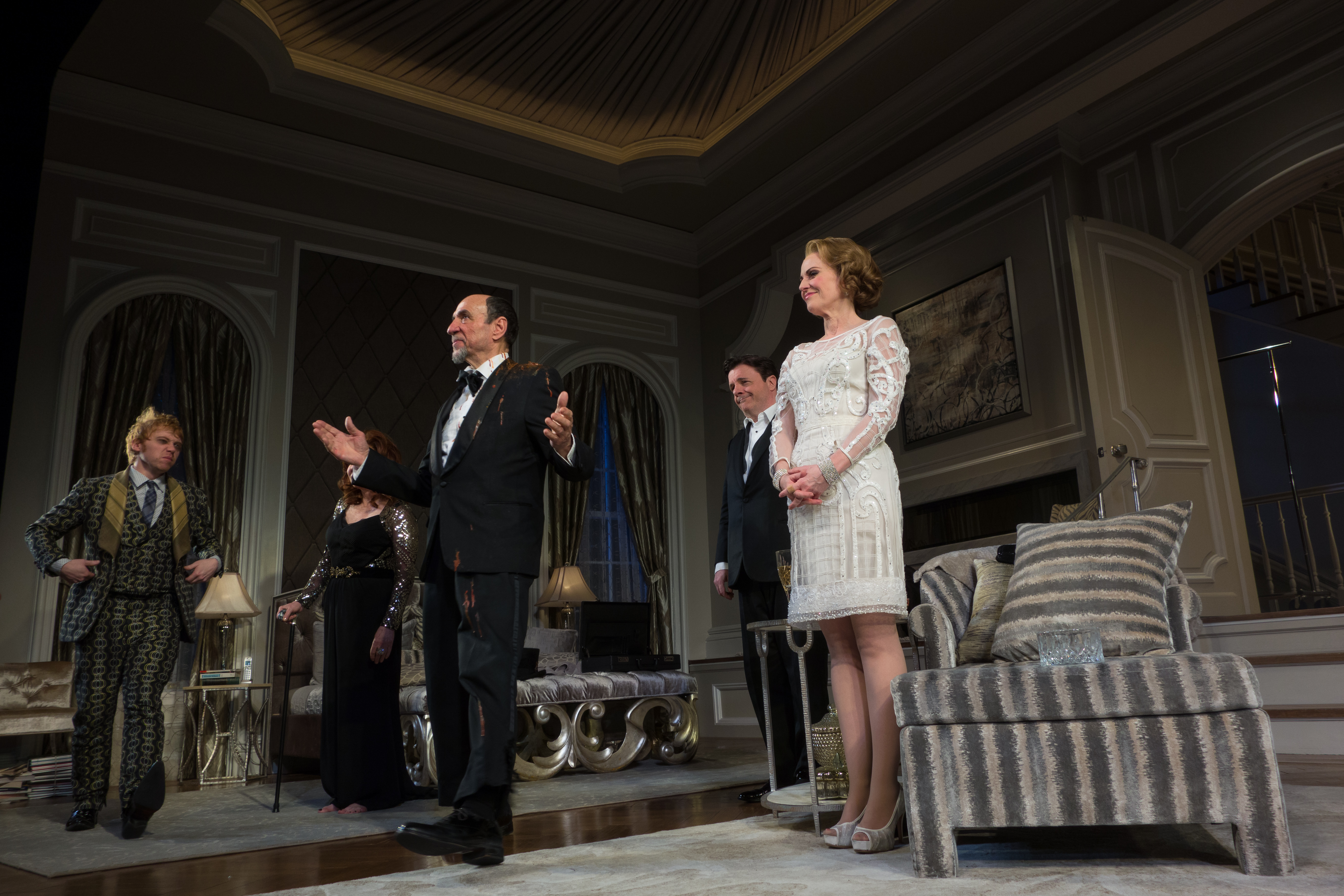
F. Murray Abraham (center front) - It's Only a Play, Gerald Schoenfeld Theatre (Manhattan, New York)

- Brian Awadis – YouTuber
- Paul Elia – Chaldean-Assyrian comedian from Detroit
- Dustin Kahia – Assyrian film director
- Henri Charr – director
- Michael Denkha – actor
- Naguib el-Rihani – actor
- F. Murray Abraham – Academy award-winning actor
- Josef Fares – film director and video game designer
- Ryan Bernier – Former Second City Artistic Director and Writer/Director of Gilgamesh! The Assyrian Epic...sorta
- Fares Fares – Swedish-Lebanese actor
- Iloosh Khoshabe – actor; bodybuilder
- Nuri Kino – journalist; filmmaker
- Terrence Malick – Academy Award-nominated director

== Artists and designers ==
- Eser Afacan – painter, and sculptor
- Hannibal Alkhas – sculptor, painter and author
- Issa Benyamin – calligrapher
- Raad Ghantous – interior designer
- Thea Halo – painter and writer
- Farouk Kaspaules – artist
- Paulus Khofri – painter, lyricist and composer
- Jim Marshall – photographer
- Bishara Morad – artist
- Fred Parhad – sculptor

== Athletes ==
=== In the Middle East ===
Athletics (Track and field)

- George Malek-Yonan – Iranian Assyrian Track & Field Athlete. Iran's Champion of Champions, Gold medalist in Pentathlon and Track & Field

Boxing

- Mustafa Hamsho – Syrian Assyrian/Syriac boxer, middleweight
- George Issabeg – Iranian Assyrian boxer; represented Iran in 1948 and 1952 Summer Olympics
- Anwar Oshana – Syrian Assyrian boxer, super middleweight in USA. Illinois State Champion
- Shoura Osipov – Iranian Assyrian boxer 1948 Summer Olympics representing Iran

Curling

- Terry Odishaw - Multiple Provincial Champion Canada including one National Championship 1986-2023
- Grant Odishaw - Multiple Provincial Champion Canada including one National Championship 1986-2026

Football (soccer)

- Douglas Aziz – Iraqi Assyrian footballer
- Ammo Baba – Iraqi Assyrian footballer and Manager of Iraq – Iraq International. Voted best Iraqi Athlete of All Time
- Saad Benyamin – Iraqi Assyrian footballer – Iraq International
- Edison David – Iraqi Assyrian footballer
- Youra Eshaya – Iraqi Assyrian footballer, first Iraqi to play professionally in the west, for Bristol Rovers, England – Iraq International
- Basil Gorgis Hanna – Iraqi Assyrian footballer – World Cup Player 1986
- Aram Karam – Iraqi Assyrian footballer – Iraq International
- Ayoub Odisho – Iraqi Assyrian footballer and club manager (in Lebanon)
- Thamer Yousif – Iraqi Assyrian footballer – Iraq International

Tennis

- Andrew Simon – Iraqi Assyrian tennis champion

=== Diaspora ===
Basketball

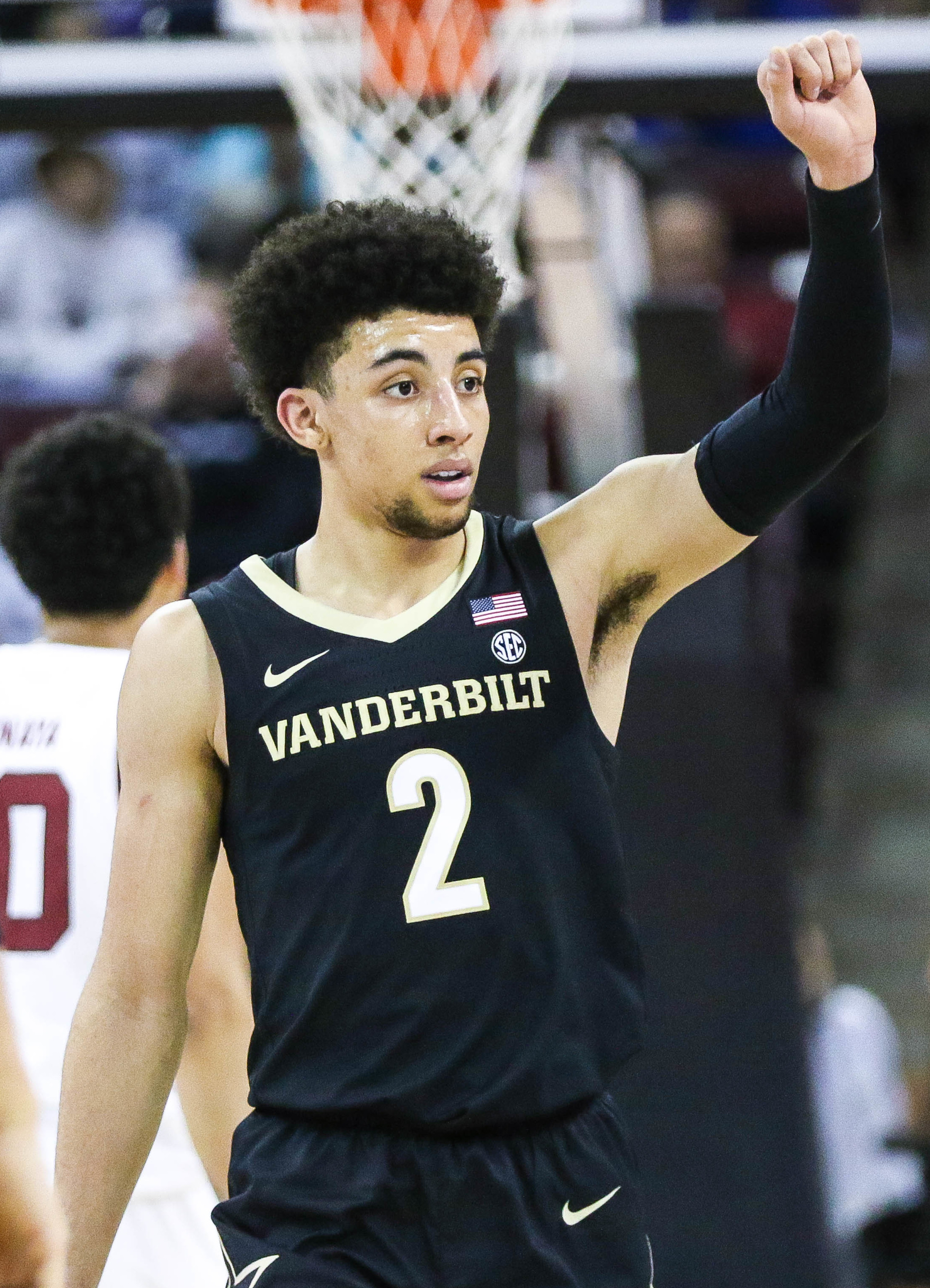
Pippen with Vanderbilt in 2020

- Scotty Pippen Jr.

American football

- Alex Agase – Assyrian American – top level American Football (Gridiron) player
- Lou Agase – Assyrian American – top level American Football (Gridiron) player

Boxing

- Mustafa Hamsho
- Anwar Oshana – Assyrian American super middleweight boxer, Illinois State Champion

Football (soccer)

- Alexander Alkhazov – Assyrian Russian footballer – plays for FC Krylia Sovetov Samara
- Zaya Avdysh – Assyrian Ukrainian footballer – Ukrainian based
- Kennedy Bakircioglu – Assyrian Swedish international footballer – Sweden based – Swedish International player
- Abgar Barsom – Assyrian Swedish footballer
- Stefan Batan – Assyrian Swedish footballer – plays for Assyriska
- Steven Beitashour – currently plays for Los Angeles FC in Major League Soccer, Iran international
- Louay Chanko – Assyrian Syrian footballer – Denmark based – Syrian International player
- Imad Chhadeh – Assyrian Swedish footballer – plays for Assyriska
- Daniyel Cimen – Assyrian German footballer
- Christian Demirtas – Assyrian German footballer – German based
- Sargon Duran – Assyrian Austrian footballer – plays for FC Sollenau
- Jimmy Durmaz – Assyrian Swedish footballer
- David Durmaz – Assyrian Swedish footballer – plays for Syrianska FC
- Ninos Gouriye – Assyrian Dutch footballer
- Andreas Haddad – Assyrian Swedish footballer – plays for Assyriska
- Dani Hamzo – Assyrian Swedish footballer – plays for Assyriska
- Zurab Ionanidze – Assyrian Georgian International footballer – Georgian International player
- Mikael Ishak – Assyrian Swedish footballer – plays for Assyriska
- Leena Khamis – Assyrian Australian female footballer – Australian Women's Football International
- Sanharib Malki – Assyrian Syrian footballer – Dutch based (Roda JC) – Syrian International player
- Justin Meram – Assyrian USA based soccer player
- Ilyas Merkes – Assyrian Syrian footballer – Syrian International player, plays for Assyriska
- George Mourad – Assyrian Syrian footballer – Iran based – Syrian International player
- Eddie Moussa – Assyrian Swedish footballer – plays for Assyriska
- Gabriel Özkan – Assyrian Swedish footballer – plays for AIK Fotboll
- Frans Dhia Putros – Assyrian Danish footballer – plays for Hobro IK in Denmark
- Mario Shabow – Assyrian Australian footballer – plays for Central Coast Mariners in the Australian A-League
- Suleyman Sleyman – Assyrian Swedish footballer – plays for Syrianska FC
- Rebin Sulaka – Assyrian Swedish footballer – Iraq International
- Jasar Takak – Dutch based Assyrian footballer, formerly of Vitesse Arnhem
- Sharbel Touma – Assyrian Swedish footballer – plays for Syrianska FC
- Gabriel Ucar – Assyrian Swedish footballer – plays for Ängelholms FF, and previously for Irish team Derry City
- Daniel Unal – Assyrian Turkish footballer – plays for FC Basle in Switzerland
- Andreas Yacoub-Haddad – Assyrian Swedish footballer – played for Assyriska
- Christer Youssef – Assyrian Swedish footballer – plays for Djurgårdens IF

Martial Arts

- Beneil Dariush – Assyrian American Mixed martial arts (MMA)
- Randa Markos – Assyrian Canadian Mixed martial arts (MMA)
- Tiras Odisho – Assyrian Iraqi Karate champion, Director General of National Olympic Committee of Iraq
- Mikhail Sado – Assyrian Russian Wrestling champion
- David Teymur – Assyrian Swedish Mixed martial arts (MMA)

Poker

- Daniel Alaei

Tennis

- Susanne Celik – Assyrian Swedish tennis player
- Andre Khabbazi – American actor and semi-pro tennis player
- Michael Shabaz – American tennis player
- Andre Agassi – American tennis player

== Educators and explorers ==
- Toma Audo – bishop, writer
- Paul Bedjan
- Louis Cheikhô – Assyrian Orientalist
- Hind Rassam Culhane – lecturer in Middle Eastern Studies and behavioural scientist
- Fuat Deniz – writer and professor of sociology at Örebro University
- Mor Philoxenos Yuhanon Dolabani – scholar, poet, editor, and translator
- Eprime Eshag – academic, professor
- Emanuel Kamber
- George Kiraz – computational linguist
- Kanan Makiya – academic, professor
- Eden Naby
- Estiphan Panoussi – philosopher and oriental philologist
- Hormuzd Rassam – Assyriologist, and first-known Middle Eastern archaeologist
- Thomas L. Saaty – Iraqi born Assyrian American mathematician
- Mikhail Sado – Russian linguist, scholar, professor of Semitic languages, orientalist, politician, former paratrooper, and wrestling champion
- Donny George Youkhanna
- Ashur Yousif

== Entrepreneurs ==
- Narsai David – American restaurateur, chef, wine-maker, and author
- Daniel Hadad – Argentine businessman involved in telecommunications and media
- Milton Malek-Yonan – American inventor of Malekized Rice
- Bob Miner – American businessman, co-founder of Oracle Corporation
- Jeff Moorad – American businessman and investor, CEO of MLB's Arizona Diamondbacks, and Vice-Chairman and CEO of MLB's San Diego Padres
- Victor Nacif – Mexican businessman, Vice President of Design at Nissan Design Europe
- Tony Rezko – American businessman, political fundraiser, restaurateur, and real estate developer.

== Leaders ==
- Malik Khoshaba – Assyrian military leader during World War I
- Agha Petros – World War I Assyrian General
- Ashur Yousif – professor and Assyrian nationalist
- Shamoun Hanne Haydo – Village leader and defender of Assyrians during Seyfo
- Melke Hanne Haydo – brother of Shamoun Hanne Haydo
- Malik Yaqo – Assyrian malik from Hakkari
- Malik Ismail II – one of the most powerful Assyrian malik’s
- Dawid Mar Shimun – Assyrian military general
- Surma D'Bait Mar Shimun – Sister of Shimun XIX Benyamin
- Toma Tomas - Iraqi Assyrian guerilla fighter

== Media ==
- Ramona Amiri – Miss World Canada 2005
- John Batchelor – author; radio host
- Jack Douglas – television host
- Claudia Hanna – Miss Iraq 2006
- Craig Morgan – sports journalist
- Diane Pathieu – news anchor based in Chicago
- Larsa Pippen – reality television personality
- Younan Nowzaradan – reality television personality
- Cindy Sargon – Australian TV chef
- Nancy Oshana Wehbe – body builder and model
- Patrick Bet-David – American entrepreneur and TV personality of Assyrian-Armenian origin
- Obelit Yadgar – American radio personality
- Alfred Yaghobzadeh – Iranian photojournalist

== Musicians and composers ==
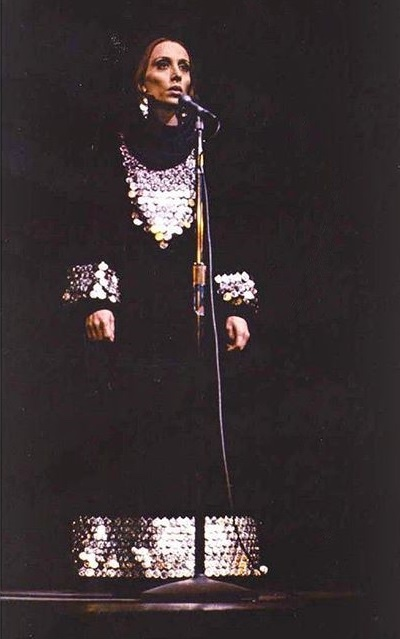
Fairuz performing in 1971

- Fairuz
- Evin Agassi
- Mousey Alexander
- Gabriel Asaad
- Jamil Bashir
- Munir Bashir
- Ashur Bet Sargis
- Aril Brikha
- Sargon Gabriel
- Linda George
- Nouri Iskandar
- Juliana Jendo
- Elias Karam
- Joseph Malke
- Paulus Khofri
- Adwar Mousa
- Habib Mousa
- Hanna Petros
- Janan Sawa
- Gaboro
- Ant Wan
- Ricky Rich
- Timz
- Marganita Vogt-Khofri
- Haitham Yousif
- Elias Zazi
- Santa Dimopulos

== Politicians ==
=== Iraq ===
- Tariq Aziz – Deputy Prime Minister of Iraq 1979–2003 (Real name Michael Youkhana)
- Basim Bello – Mayor of Tel Kaif, Iraq
- Lara Yussif Zara – Mayor of Alqosh
- Yonathan Betkolia – Secretary General of the Assyrian Universal Alliance and Iran Parliament Representative
- Bahnam Zaya Bulos – Iraq Minister of Transport (2003–2004)
- Basimah Yusuf Butrus – Iraq Minister of Science and Technology 2005–2006
- Elizabeth Gawrie – Deputy Prime Minister of Rojava
- Kamel Hana Gegeo – chief bodyguard to Saddam Hussein
- Franso Hariri – Mayor of Erbil
- Fawzi Franso Hariri – Iraq Parliament Representative, Current Minister of Industry in Iraq
- Yonadam Kanna – Secretary General of the Assyrian Democratic Movement and Iraq Parliament Representative
- Sarkis Aghajan Mamendo – current Minister of Finance and Economy in Kurdistan Regional Government
- Wijdan Michael – current Minister of Human Rights in Iraq
- Ablahad Afraim Sawa – Iraq Parliament Representative
- Pascal Esho Warda – Iraq Minister of Immigration and Refugees 2003–2004
- Albert Edward Ismail Yelda – Iraq Ambassador to the Vatican
- Yusuf Salman Yusuf – Secretary General of Iraqi Communist Party 1941–1949

=== Iran ===
- Yonathan Betkolia – Iranian Assyrian parliamentarian
- Sharli Envieh Takie – Iranian Assyrian parliamentarian

=== Turkey ===
- Erol Dora – Deputy of Grand National Assembly of Turkey
- George Aslan – Deputy of Grand National Assembly of Turkey

=== United Nations ===
- Dr. William Ishaya – Deputy Permanent Representative – Mission of the Republic of Iraq to the United Nations in New York, USA.

=== In the Assyrian diaspora ===
==== United States ====
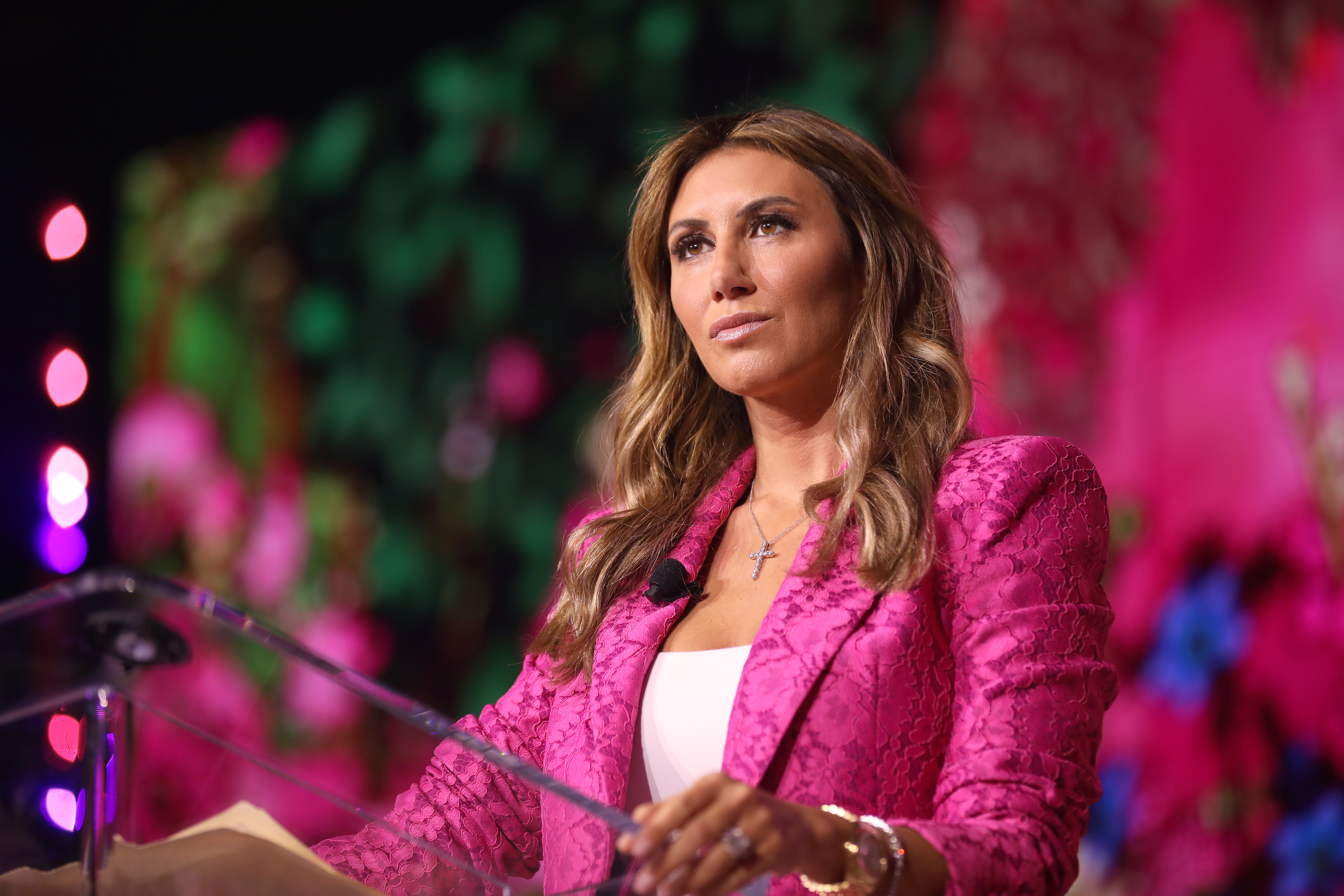
Alina Habba, Young Women’s Leadership Summit (2024).

- Alina Habba – Counselor to Donald Trump (45th and 47th U.S. President)
- Mark Arabo – politician based in San Diego, California
- Adam Benjamin, Jr. – Indiana Congressman
- Wadie Deddeh – former California State Senator
- Anna Eshoo – California Congresswoman
- John Nimrod – Illinois Senator
- Atour Sargon – Lincolnwood Trustee

==== Australia ====
- Ninos Khoshaba – former Member of the New South Wales Parliament Sydney Australia
- Andrew Rohan – current State Member for Smithfield New South Wales Parliament, and Fairfield City Council Councillor for the Liberal Party of Australia

==== Sweden ====
- Metin Ataseven – Sweden Parliament Representative
- Ibrahim Baylan – Sweden Minister of Education 2004–2006 and Sweden Parliament Representative
- Yilmaz Kerimo – Sweden Parliament Representative
- Ilan De Basso – Former member of the European Parliament 2021-2024

==== Canada ====
- Helena Guergis – former Canadian Member of Parliament and Minister of State (Status of Women)

==== Netherlands ====
- Attiya Gamri – Netherlands Parliament Representative, president of the Assyrian Confederation of Europe

==== Other countries ====
- Iskender Alptekin – politician, singer and former President of the European Syriac Union
- José Murat Casab – (born to Assyrian Iraqi immigrants) Mexican politician and a member of the Institutional Revolutionary Party also former Governor of Oaxaca
- Sargon Dadesho – activist, author and leader of Assyrian National Congress
- Eugene Dooman
- Emmanuel Kamber – Assyrian Universal Alliance Secretary General

== Religious figures ==
- Basile Georges Casmoussa
- David Benjamin Keldani
- Dinkha IV, 1935–2015
- Elias Mellus
- Emil Shimoun Nona
- Emmanuel III Delly
- George Garmo
- Ignatius Isaac Azar
- Josephus Adjutus – 17th century theologian
- Louis Cheikho
- Mar Mari Emmanuel – bishop and influencer
- Paulos Faraj Rahho
- Pkidha, 104–114 – first Bishop of Adiabene
- Ragheed Aziz Ganni
- Raphael I Bidawid
- Shimun XXI Eshai
- Shimun XIX Benyamin, 1903–1918
- Shlemon Warduni
- Tatian, 120–180
- Youhannan Semaan Issayi
- Yosip Khnanisho, 1893–1977
- Yusuf Akbulut

== Writers and poets ==
- Ilyas Mawsili
- Maria Theresa Asmar
- Yosip Bet Yosip
- Sargon Boulus
- Nina Burleigh
- William D. S. Daniel
- Fuat Deniz
- Thea Halo
- Samuel John Hazo
- Ivan Kakovitch
- Paulus Khofri
- George Lamsa
- Rosie Malek-Yonan
- Terrence Malick
- Dunya Mikhail
- Alphonse Mingana
- Leilah Nadir
- Heather Raffo
- Mikhael K. Pius
- Yuhanon Qashisho
- Ishaya Shamasha Dawid Bet-Zia

== Other ==
- Lado Davydov – Soviet soldier during the Second World War and Hero of the Soviet Union
- Sergey Sarkhoshev – Soviet soldier during the Second World War and Hero of the Soviet Union

== See also ==
- Assyrian people
- Assyrian diaspora
- Assyrian homeland
