= List of Iranian Assyrians =

This is a list of famous Assyrian-Iranians.

== Art ==
- Sooren Alexander 1935-2007 born in Hamadan, Iran -musical composer & musician (younger brother of Sargon Mayelian)
- Albert Khoshaba 1937-2023 born in Hamadan, Iran - singer. Was the first Assyrian to have a program on Radio Iran and appear on Iranian TV. The late Nebu Issabey, 1933-2014 also composed and played with him.
- Evin Agassi - singer
- Ashurbanipal Babilla (1944 Tehran - New York City) - actor, theatre director, playwright and visual artist
- Issa Benyamin (born 1924 Tabriz) - calligraphist
- Aril Brikha (born 1976 Tehran) - musician
- George Chaharbakhshi (born 1952 Tehran) - singer
- Henri Charr - film director
- William D. S. Daniel, author, poet, and musician
- Jack Douglas (1921 Kermanshah - 1994 Los Angeles) - television personality
- Andre Khabbazi (born 1975 Sacramento) - actor
- Paulus Khofri (1923 Baghdad-2000 Tehran) - composer and painter
- Terrence Malick (born 1943 Ottawa) - film director and producer
- Sargon Mayelian 1934-2006 born in Kermanshah, Iran -musical composer & musician (older brother of Sooren Alexander)
- Shamiram Urshan (1938 Tehran-2011 Los Angeles) - singer
- Marganita Vogt-Khofri (born 1952 Kermanshah) - musician

== Literature ==
- John Batchelor (born 1948 Bryn Mawr) - journalist
- Ivan Kakovitch (1933 Kiev-2006 Paris) journalist and author
- Eden Naby (born 1942 Gulpashan) - historian
- Mikhael Pius (1927 Baghdad-2011 Modesto) - historian

== Politics ==
- Freydun Atturaya (1891 Urmia-1926 Tbilisi) - physician and politician
- Yonathan Betkolia (born 1951 Urmia) - politician
- Eugene Dooman (1890 Osaka - 1969) - diplomat
- George Malek-Yonan - politician
- John Nimrod (1922 Chicago - 2009) - politician

== Religion ==
- Aphrahat (3rd and 4th centuries) - Christian author
- Toma Audo (1854 Alqosh - 1918 Urmia) - Catholic archbishop
- Paul Bedjan (1838 Khosrowabad - 1920 Cologne) - Catholic priest and orientalist
- David Benjamin Keldani (1867 rmia-1940) - Catholic priest
- Yohannan Gabriel (1758 Khosrowabad - 1833 Khosrowabad) - Catholic bishop of Salmas
- Jacob David (1873 Sir - 1967 Chicago) pastor and relief worker
- Andrew David Urshan (1884 near Urmia - 1967 United States) - evangelist and author
- Ramzi Garmou (born 1945 Zakho) - Catholic Metropolitan Archbishop of Tehran
- Ishodad of Merv (9th century) - bishop
- Youhannan Semaan Issayi (1914 Sanandaj - 1999 Tehran) - Catholic Metropolitan Archbishop of Tehran
- Nicholas I Zaya (born Khosrowabad - died 1855 Khosrowabad) - Catholic Patriarch of Babylon

== Sciences ==
- Bukhtishu family - famous medieval physicians
- Eprime Eshag (1918 Urmia-1998 Oxford) - economist
- Alexander George (1920 Chicago-2006 Seattle) - scholar in political sciences

== Sports ==
- Alex Agase (1922 Chicago-2007 Tarpon Springs) - American football player
- Daniel Alaei (born 1983) - poker player
- Steven Beitashour (born 1987 San Jose) - football player
- Beneil Dariush (born 1989 Umira) - mixed martial artist
- Youra Eshaya (1933-1992 Sweden) - football player
- George Issabeg (born 1930) - boxer
- Benny Koochoie (born 1986) - basketballer
- Jeff Moorad - baseball executive
- Shoura Osipov boxer
- Michael Shabaz (born 1987 Fairfax County) - tennis player
- Eskandar Shora - boxer
- Henrik Tamraz (1935 Urmia - 1996) - weightlifter
- Gela Youhanna - football player
- Edmond Yunanpour (born 1963 Ahvaz) - football manager and former player

== Others ==
- Ramona Amiri (born 1980 Montreal) - Miss Canada 2005
- Patrick Bet-David (1978-) - Podcaster and businessman
- Milton Malek-Yonan (1904 Urmia-2002 Carmel) - entrepreneur and inventor
- Bob Miner (1941 Cicero-1994 San Francisco) - businessman
- Estiphan Panoussi (born 1935 Sanandaj) - philosopher and oriental philologist (Persian, Arabic and Neo-Aramaic)
- Juliana Taimoorazy (born 1973 in Tehran) - Assyrian activist and humanitarian

== See also ==
- List of Iranians
- List of Iranian Arabs
