= John Craton =

American classical composer

John Douglas Craton (born August 6, 1953) is an American classical composer. His works have been performed throughout the United States, Europe, and Japan. While his compositions cover a diverse range, he is best known for his operas, ballets, and works for classical mandolin.

== Biography ==
Craton was born August 6, 1953, in Anniston, Alabama. Though neither of his parents was musical, his extended family included many musicians, both amateurs and professionals, among them his cousin, concert pianist and composer Barbara Gallagher. He began his formal musical training at age 10 studying violin under retired violinist and conductor, Robert Louis Barron. After graduating from Saks High School, he studied violin and piano at Jacksonville State University before transferring to Lipscomb University, where he earned his B.A. Craton studied theory and composition under John Maltese, Gerald Moore, and Henry Fusner. His graduate degree from Indiana University Bloomington was in audiology, and Craton practiced as a clinical audiologist for several years in Indiana before returning to his musical roots and devoting his full-time to teaching and composing.

Craton's music is highly tonal and in general reflects a style of English pastoralism, often incorporating onomatopoeic elements sometimes described as "nature music." His music has been variously characterized as "atmospheric," "dramatic and challenging," "largely traditional ... playful," and occasionally even reflecting "a medieval/Renaissance flavor." He has been performed by such artists and ensembles as Sebastiaan de Grebber, Gertrud Weyhofen, Sinella Aghasi, Ljubomir Velickovic, Takumi Mamiya, Lisa Ferrigno, Het CONSORT, the Netherlands Symphony Orchestra, Filarmonica Mandolini Alba Sapporo, Townsend Opera, and the Bloomington and Amsterdam Symphony Orchestras. Romanian opera composer and conductor Leonard Dumitriu has described Craton's music as "coming from some other time and planet," stating that although he "may be an American living in the present, ... [his] music comes from the time of Haydn and Mozart, or, better, from a world without time, where ... even the cares are easy and bright ... a musical world of sonorous peace and joy." Many of Craton's works are published by Wolfhead Music.

While in his early years Craton often performed on violin, piano, recorder, and other instruments, he abandoned public performance after a hand injury and has since devoted himself completely to teaching and composing. He currently operates a private music studio in Bedford, Indiana.

== Works ==
=== Opera ===
- The Curious Affair of the Count of Monte Blotto
- Defiance: A One-minute Opera
- The Fashionable Lady
- Gilgamesh
- Inanna: An Opera of Ancient Sumer
- The Parliament of Fowls
- The Reconciliation
- Saint Mary of Egypt
- Tom Ojos Azules
- Vasya Whitefeet

=== Ballet ===
- L'Atelier du tailleur de pierre
- Les chats du Bagarreau
- Dans les ténèbres
  - La Boîte à musique
  - Le Grenier
  - Le Cimetière
- The Dartmoor Pixies
- Emilia
- Les gentilles sirènes
- The Huluppu Tree (from Inanna)
- The Jumblies
- Labyrinth (pas seul)
- Mother Goose
- The Muleshoe Marathon
- Nefertiti
- Pierrot & Pierrette (a.k.a. Le mime solitaire)
- La Soirée des animaux
- The Tattered Slippers
- Through the Looking-Glass
- Voyageur de temps : un ballet électronique

=== Orchestral ===
- Ann Putnam Overture
- Apologetic Waltz for string orchestra
- Assyrian Fantasy for violin, strings & percussion
- Ava's Vignettes for string orchestra
- Beowulf: The Orchestral Suite
- Bloemen van Spanje (Flowers of Spain) for two guitars & strings
- Cantique des montées
- A Christmas Card
- Coronach for the Martyrs of Our Lady of Salvation
- Danseries anciennes for mandolin orchestra
- Gilgamesh Overture
- Inanna Orchestral Suite
- Lassitude for string orchestra with solo violin & violoncello
- The Legend of Princess Noccalula for mandolin & orchestra
- Mongolian Folk Songs for viola & chamber orchestra
- Niños Jugando for guitar & mandolin orchestra
- Pagan Festivals for string orchestra
- A Silly Jig for mandolin orchestra
- Three Paintings by Nikolai Blokhin for violin & strings
- Triptych for string orchestra

=== Concertos ===
- Concerto for 2 Mandolins & Orchestra ("Rromane Bjavela")
- Flute Concerto
- Mandolin Concerto No. 1 in D Minor
- Mandolin Concerto No. 2 in D Major
- Mandolin Concerto No. 3 in E Minor
- Mandolin Concerto No. 4 in G Major
- Tuba Concerto in G Minor

=== Chamber ===
- Les Adieux for violin & piano
- Antebellum Suite for violin & piano
- Autumn Leaf for flute & harp
- Beowulf: A Suite for Ancient Instruments
- Berceuse for violin & piano
- Charon Crossing the Styx for mandolin & double bass
- Dance of the Fey Folk for violin & piano
- Dioses aztecas for mandolin & piano
- Divertissements médiévaux for violin & piano
- Duettino No. 1 in A for two violins
- Duettino No. 2 in D for two violins
- Duettino No. 3 in B-flat for two violins
- Elementals for flute & piano
- Five Apothegms for violin, horn & trombone
- Five Observations for five to six instruments & voice
- Four Cornish Sketches for violin & piano
- Four Little Moments for violin & piano
- Four Little Pastorales for violin & piano
- Four Whimsies for mandola & mandocello
- Gorillas for two violins
- Les gravures de Gustave Doré for mandolin & guitar
- The Gray Wolf for mandolin solo
- In Memoriam: George Kirles for violoncello & piano
- Kalimba Maya for kalimba solo
- L'Ombre de la tour d'horloge for violoncello & piano
- Perpetuum Mobile for mandolin solo
- Petite Suite for violin & piano
- Processional for string quartet
- Quatuor pour les jeunes for string quartet
- Ricordando Pi for violin & piano
- Romanza for clarinet & piano
- Scherzo for violin & piano
- Seven Pieces in First Position for violin & piano
- Seven Variations on "What If a Day, or a Month, or a Yeare" for lute or guitar
- Six Easy Pieces for viola & piano
- Six Pantomimes for two mandolins
- Sonata Colloquia for marimba & piano
- Sonata for Solo Violin
- Sonate for violin, clarinet & piano ("Trois petites filles")
- Sonatina for saxophone & piano
- Sonatina in F for recorder & harpsichord
- Sonatina No. 1 for violin & piano
- Sonatina No. 2 in A Major for violin & piano
- Sonatina No. 3 in G Major for violin & mandolin
- Sonatina No. 4 ("Sonatina semplice") for violin & piano
- Sonatina No. 5 in E Major for violin & piano
- Sonatina No. 6 ("Israeli Sonatina") for violin & piano
- String Quartet
- Tango for four guitars & chitarrone
- Three Tableaux from George MacDonald for recorder, mandolin & violoncello
- Tombeau for Richard Dohrmann for violin & piano
- Triosatz for three violins
- Trois sœurs assyriennes for flute & piano
- Twelve Variations on La Follia for violin & piano
- Valse-Caprice for violin & piano
- Variations from Der Fluyten Lust-hof of Jakob Van Eyck for mandolin solo
- Variations on a Traditional Theme for solo violin
- The Visitation for violin & piano

=== Piano (keyboard) ===
- L'anneau des fees (for celesta or piano)
- Bag o' Tails: A menagerie of (almost) 10 bagatelles for piano and unbreakable Native American medicine rattle
- A Cat's Life
- A Childhood Scrapbook
- Eight Little Vignettes
- Ffynnon Dyfnog (St. Dyfnog's Well)
- Five Psalms for Organ
- I Am Goya
- Morris Dance (piano, 4 hands)
- Nymphes (2 pianos, 4 hands)
- Passacaglia for Organ
- Pegasus Suite
- Piano Sonata in Free Form (Hilton Head, S.C.)
- Piano Sonata No. 2 in B Major
- The Rennab Delgnaps Rats
- Simple Pleasures
- Six Little Pastorals
- Six Miniatures
- Southern Indiana Sketches
- Where They Dwell

=== Vocal/choral ===
- An Aestuary (A Calm Evening) for voice & piano
- Arreglos de Canciones Tradicionales Españolas for voice & piano
- Berceuse (Dodo l'enfant do) for voice & piano
- A Child's Prayer at Evening for voice & piano
- Jardin sentimental : Cinq poèmes d'Émile Nelligan for voice & piano
- The Love Song of J. Alfred Prufrock for tenor & strings
- Lullaby for Aidan for voice & piano
- Messe en l'honneur des martyrs modernes for SSAATTBB choir & organ
- A Morning Prayer for voice & piano
- Six Japanese Songs for soprano & piano
- Songs for Children, Books 1, 2 & 3 for voice & piano
- The Way Everlasting for SATB choir

=== Arrangements/orchestrations ===
- Biber — Sonata Representativa (string orchestra)
- Craton — The Armadillo Races at Victoria, Texas (wind ensemble)
- Craton — Coronach for the Martyrs of Our Lady of Salvation (wind ensemble)
- Craton — Lullaby (from "Four Whimsies") (string orchestra)
- Daniel — Festival (soprano, mezzo-soprano & orchestra)
- Daniel — Maiden of Dreams (soprano & orchestra)
- Daniel — Memories of Fatherland (soprano & orchestra)
- Daniel — Nineveh (soprano & orchestra)
- Daniel — Spinning Wheel Song (soprano, mezzo-soprano & orchestra)
- Daniel — Tears of the Beloved (mezzo-soprano & orchestra)
- Dobyns — Three Rags (mandolin orchestra)
- Gianneo — Cinco Piezas (solo mandolin & string orchestra)
- Issabey — Qooyama (chorus & orchestra)
- Issabey — Roomrama (soprano & orchestra)
- Issabey — Ya Umta (chorus & orchestra)
- Khofri — The Nation Sacrifices (chorus & orchestra)
- Khofri — The Vacant Nineveh (chorus & orchestra)
- Kioulaphides — Four Souvenirs (string orchestra)
- Salieri — 26 Variazioni sulla Follia di Spagna (violin & piano)

== Discography ==
- Excerpt from Gilgamesh: An Assyrian Opera — Tablet VII: "Enkidu's Death & Lament of Gilgamnesh." Gottschalk Music Center Orchestra, John Kendall Bailey, cond. Assyryt: The Assyrian Diamond CD and DVD. Assyrian Market, MN2009DVD/CD.
- Excerpts from Gilgamesh: An Assyrian Opera — Overture; Tablet VI: "The Bull of Heaven." Excerpts from Inanna: An Opera of Ancient Sumer — Aria: "I, the Lady"; Ballet: "The Huluppu Tree"; Drinking Song from beginning of Act III. Sibel Demirman, Donn Bradley, Lorraine Davis, Julie Anne Miller, Barbara Wesley, vocalists; Sarah Weaver, Joseph Adkins, David Riskin, dancers of the Central West Ballet; René Daveluy, choreographer; orchestra of the Townsend Opera Players; Chase Spruill, solo violin; Ryan Murray, cond. Mediterranean Night CD and DVD. Assyrian Market, mesc-001 (CD), mesd-001 (DVD).
- The Orchestral Music of John Craton. Ann Putnam Overture, Excerpts from The Parliament of Fowls, The Reconciliation, The Fashionable Lady, La Boîte à musique, and The Curious Affair of the Count of Monte Blotto; Orchestral Suite from Inanna. Wolfhead Music, 884501052672.
- "The Gray Wolf." Fantasia Romantica. Sebastiaan de Grebber, mandolin. Stemra, SDG001-07.
- "The Legend of Princess Noccalula." Music for Mandolin Orchestra. Sebastiaan de Grebber, solo mandolin. Het CONSORT. Alex Timmerman, conducting. Stemra ATSDG03-08.
