= AUAF =

AUAF may refer to:

- American University of Afghanistan (or AUoA)
- Assyrian Universal Alliance Foundation, a non-profit organization in Chicago
