= Eser (name) =

Eser is both a Turkish surname and a Turkish given name. Notable people with the name include:

== Given name ==
- Eser Afacan (born 1953), artist, painter and sculptor
- Eser Kardeşler (born 1964), Turkish football manager and player
- Eser Yağmur (born 1983), Turkish footballer
- Eser Yenenler (born 1984), Turkish comedian, TV presenter and actor.

== Surname ==
- Albin Eser, (1935–2023), German judge
- Burhan Eşer (born 1985), Turkish footballer
- Mustafa Eser (born 2001), Turkish footballer
- Sertan Eser (born 1974), Turkish footballer
- Willibald Eser (1933–2005), German screenwriter
