= Euser =

Euser is a surname. Notable people with the surname include:

- Cor Euser (born 1957), Dutch racing driver
- Dan Euser, Canadian artist, sculptor, designer, and landscape architect
- Lucas Euser (born 1983), American cyclist

== See also ==
- Eser (name)
