= Roomrama =

De facto national anthem of the Assyrian people

- The Assyrian flag
- National (de facto) anthem of Assyria
- Lyrics: Yosip Bet Yosip
- Music: Nebu Juel Issabey

Roomrama (Syriac: ܪܘܼܡܪܵܡܵܐ) is the de facto national anthem of the Assyrian people. It was composed by Nebu Juel Issabey and written by Yosip Bet Yosip for the Assyrian Universal Alliance and the Assyrian independence movement.

Another de facto, or unofficial, national anthem for Assyrians is Salma d'Shoobakhan (Syriac: ܨܲܠܡܵܐ ܕܫܘܼܒܵܚܲܢ).

== Background ==
The original lyrics to Roomrama were written by Yosip Bet Yosip, an Assyrian poet and singer originally from Urmia, Iran. In 1968, the Assyrian Universal Alliance were seeking new symbols to represent the Assyrian people worldwide, including a national anthem. Taking inspiration from Beethoven's Symphony No. 9, Yosip wrote the lyrics in commemoration of Mesopotamia as well as to encourage unity.

The musical composure of Roomrama was made in part by Nebu Juel Issabey, an Assyrian musician originally from Tabriz. Issabey was previously a popular musician in his native country and led the Nineveh Choir both there and in the United States (of which Yosip was also a member of). He collaborated with Yosip and composed Roomrama in hopes of unifying Assyrians and its international recognition as an anthem.

== Lyrics ==
ܩܵܐ ܪܘܼܡܪܵܡܵܐ ܕܫܸܡܵܐ ܪܵܡܵܐ
ܕܐܘܼܡܬܲܢ ܐܵܬܘܿܪ ܟܵܠܲܚ ܒܫܠܵܡܵܐ
ܗ̇ܝ ܕܗ݇ܘܹܐ ܠܵܗ̇ ܕܲܪܓܘܼܫܬܵܐ ܕܡܲܪܕܘܼܬܵܐ
ܩܵܐ ܐܝܼܩܵܪܵܐ ܕܐܲܒ݂ܵܗܵܬܲܢ
ܐܵܢܝܼ ܕܦܪܝܼܣ ܠܗܘܿܢ ܠܡܸܬ ܥܲܡܪܵܢܝܼܬܵܐ
ܐܵܢܝܼ ܕܡܗܘܼܕܝܵܐ ܠܗܘܿܢ ܐܵܗ ܒܲܪܢܵܫܘܼܬܵܐ
ܕܥܵܡܪܵܐ ܗ݇ܘܵܐ ܒܫܠܵܡܵܐ ܗܲܠ ܐܵܒܵܕܘܼܬܵܐ
ܕܚܲܝ̈ܘܿܗ̇ ܥܵܒ݂ܪܝܼ ܗ݇ܘܵܘ ܒܪܘܵܚܲܢܝܘܼܬܵܐ
ܕܝܵܪܡܵܐ ܗ݇ܘܵܐ ܒܡܵܪܝܵܐ ܓܵܘ ܥܸܠܵܝܘܼܬܵܐ

=== Transliteration ===
Qa Roomrama D-Shima Rama
D-Umtan Atoor Kalakh B-Shlama
Ay D-Weela Dargooshta D-Mardoota
Qa Eeqara D-Awahatan
Aney D-prisloon L-Mitamranita
Aney D-Mhoodyaloon Ah Barnashoota
D-Amrawa B-Shlama Hal Abadoota
D-Khayo Oree'wa B-Rwakhaniyoota
D-Yarmawa B-Marya Go Elayoota

=== English Translation ===
For the honor and advancement
Of our great nation Assyria
That was the cradle of civilization,
For the honor of our forefathers
Who spread across the globe
And guided nations,
To exist in peace forever
Live with wealth and abundance
And achieve greatness in God.
