= Marganita Vogt-Khofri =

Assyrian classical musician and vocalist (b. 1952)

Marganita "Maggie" Vogt-Khofri (Persian: مارگانیتا خفری; born 1952) is an Assyrian pianist, classical musician and vocalist.

== Biography ==
Vogt-Khofri was born in Kermanshah, Iran in 1952 to Jeni and Paulus Khofri, both from Iraq. Her father was a famous Assyrian composer, and also maestro and painter. She married Edwin Vogt and moved to Zürich with him, along with their two children in 1984.

Khofri is also a volunteer social activist and works for Karitas, a division of the International Red Cross and Red Crescent in Switzerland that helps people of the Middle East, such as Iranians, Kurds and Assyrians request refuge and immigration.

== Music ==
Vogt-Khofri began studying piano at the age of eleven, when her family was in Tehran. She went to Tehran Conservatory of Music and then moved to the United States to complete high school. Soon, she began studying Christian spiritual songs and playing the guitar.

She returned to Tehran and attended the University of Tehran, earning her master's degree in piano, opera and musicology. She was accepted to Tehran's Opera House, the Roodaki Hall, as a vocalist (soprano and alto) when she was 18. There, she performed for twelve years in the choir and later became the director of the Women’s Conservatory of Tehran for many years.

Vogt-Khofri is a member of the Assyrian Folkloric Dancing Ensemble. The Iranian Ministry of Culture and Arts selected her as a folkloric representative to participate in the Arts Festival at the Folkloric Music and Dances of Worldwide Nations in Cannes.

== See also ==
- Paulus Khofri
- List of Assyrians
