= Assyrian flag =

Assyria
- Use: Ethnic flag
- Adopted: 1971; 55 years ago
- Design: White field with a golden circle at the center, surrounded by a four-pointed star in blue. Four triple-colored (red-white-blue), widening, wavy stripes connect the center to the four corners of the flag.
- Designed by: George Bet Atanous

The Assyrian flag (Syriac: ܐܬܐ ܕܐܬܘܪܝܐ ;ܐܬܐ ܣܘܪ̈ܝܐ) is the ethnic flag of the Assyrian people. The flag was first designed by George Bit Atanous in 1968, and was adopted in 1971 during a gathering of Assyrian organizations. The Assyrian Universal Alliance, Bet-Nahrain Democratic Party, Assyrian Democratic Organization, and all participants at the Assyrian Universal Alliance World Congress are believed to be some of the first organizations to have adopted the modern Assyrian flag.

The flag has a white background with a golden circle at the center, surrounded by a four-pointed star in blue, representing the ancient sun god Shamash. Four triple-colored (red-white-blue), widening, wavy stripes connect the center to the four corners of the flag. The figure of pre-Christian Assyrian God Ashur, known from Iron Age iconography, features above the center.

== Symbolism ==
The golden circle at the center represents the sun, which, by its exploding and leaping flames, generates heat and light to sustain the earth and all its living things. The four-pointed star surrounding the sun symbolizes the land, its light blue color symbolizing tranquility. Together, they form the main star present on the flag which represents the sun deity Shamash, also known as Utu. He was worshipped in the ancient Mesopotamian region, and was apparently the deity who provided leaders like Hammurabi, Ur-Nammu, and Gudea with divine laws.

The wavy stripes extending from the center to the four corners of the flag represent the three major rivers of the Assyrian homeland: the Tigris, the Euphrates, and the Great Zab. The lines are small at the center and become wider as they spread out from the circle. The dark blue stripes stands for plenitude, and represents the Euphrates. The red stripes, whose blood-red hue stands for courage, glory, and pride, represent the Tigris. The white lines in between the two great rivers symbolize the Great Zab; its white color stands for tranquility and peace. Some interpret the red, white, and blue will gather all the Assyrians back to their homeland to stand strong and fight for what they want and what they have gained.

The archer figure above the star of Shamash symbolizes the ancient Assyrian god Ashur, shown in a battle stance with a bow and arrow. The original version of the flag adopted by the Assyrian Universal Alliance had the Shamash in bronze, blue, and white coloring that represented the engravings of Ashur found at the British Museum. Other variations of the flag show the Ashur symbol in all red or gold, or just leave it out altogether.

== History ==
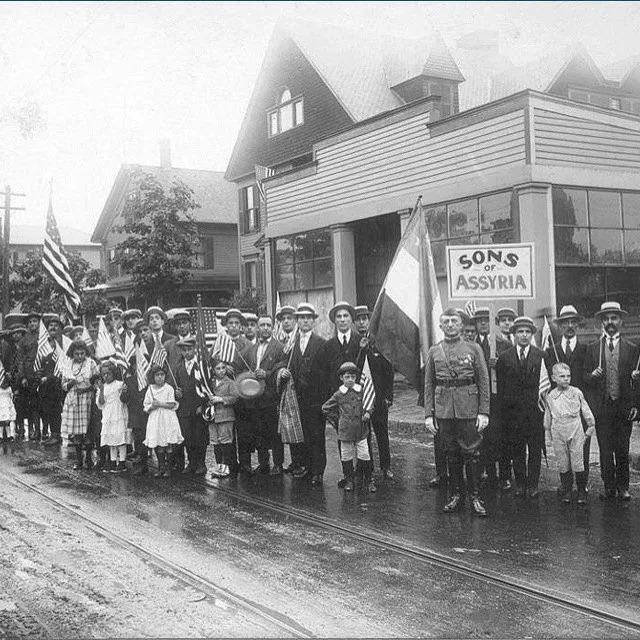
Group picture with the old Assyrian flag (Sons of Assyria)

An advert for the Assyro-Chaldean delegation of the Paris Peace Conference

Prior to World War I, Assyrians from the Tur Abdin region designed a flag consisting of three horizontal tricolor stripes colored purple, white, and red, with three white stars at the upper hoist. The purple, white, and red bars represented the loyalty, purity, and determination of the Assyrian people, and the three white stars represent the three names or components of the Assyrian nation; Assyrians, Syriacs, and Chaldeans. This flag was used during delegation meetings with Assyrian politicians and Western powers post World War I, including the Assyro-Chaldean delegation of the Paris Peace Conference. Alternative variations of the flag exist with a salmon stripe instead of a purple one.

During the First World War, the Assyrian volunteers commanded by Agha Petros used a red flag with a white cross. Agha Petros' personal standard was the flag of the Volunteers but made of silk, with a golden fringe added, and the words "Trust God and follow the Cross" written in Assyrian above and around the cross. Malik Qambar, a Chaldean Catholic Assyrian, created his own flag in a style reminiscent of the French flag, with a multi-cone star in the center and three stripes on the top.

The three stripe flag was also in use by the Assyrian National Federation, later renamed the Assyrian American Federation and the Assyrian American National Federation, from its founding in 1933 until 1975 when they adopted the current Assyrian flag. Syriac Orthodox Assyrians in Worcester, Massachusetts had also used the flag near their churches before the advent of the modern naming dispute.

=== Modern flag ===
Following the founding of the Assyrian Universal Alliance, the organization set out to create a brand new Assyrian flag. In 1968, they launched a contest that called for Assyrian artists to envision a new Assyrian flag that would be used to represent the people and their heritage. The early inspirations of the design for the flag came from Vladimir Beit David, an Assyrian originally from Iran who incorporated the modern symbolism such as the star of Ishtar into Assyrian associations and activities in Tehran. This star design would over time be incorporated into greater use across Assyrian organizations.

The modern design of the flag is credited to George Bit-Atanous, a seismic engineer from Russia whose family was originally from Urmia. As he continued to engage in personal studies, Atanous was actively involved in several Assyrian organizations, and personally studied Assyriology, taking inspiration from the field to incorporate ancient Assyrian iconography into modern designs and symbols. He presented his design for the modern flag at the 3rd annual AUA congress, which was unanimously accepted.

The design of the flag was decided on during the 6th annual AUA congress in Yonkers, New York. Throughout the 1970s leading into the 1980s, the modern design of the flag would be used more frequently, replacing the former three stripe design.

=== Alternate variations ===
In 1980, the journal Bahro Suryoyo of the Syriac Federation of Sweden (Swedish: Syrianska Riksförbundet i Sverige) created a new flag in the wake of the Swedish naming conflict between Assyrian and Aramean. The flag features a red background and a yellow eagle design based on the excavations at Tell Halaf in the 20th century. A flame was added later on to represent the Holy Spirit, but is said to have originated from Assyrian symbolism that was used by organizations in Lebanon and the diaspora before the advent of the modern naming dispute.

Sometime between the 1990s and 2000s, a new flag was created that aimed to represent the Chaldean Catholic part of the Assyrian community. The Chaldean flag bears a white background with two blue stripes on the left and right-hand sides, with a combination of the stars of Shamash and Ishtar in the middle. However, the flag has received criticism for its association with the Assyrian naming dispute and larger sectarianism in the Assyrian community, as well as a copyright in place by the creator and a lawsuit involving Chaldean Catholic bishop Sarhad Yawsip Jammo.

In 2017, the Syriac Union Party (Syria) and Syriac Military Council began using a new tri-colored flag to represent Assyrians in the Democratic Autonomous Administration of North and East Syria. However, the flag is considered unofficial and has rarely seen use outside of the party or Syria altogether.

== Gallery ==
=== Variants ===
The Assyrian flag with the image of Assur in red

The Assyrian flag with the image of Assur in shades of gold and blue, adopted by the Assyrian Universal Alliance

The Assyrian flag with the image of Assur in gold

The Assyrian flag without the image of Assur, used by the Nineveh Plain Protection Units

=== Older flags ===
Assyrian flag designed before World War I and used until 1975

The flag used by the Assyrian volunteers during World War I

=== Alternative flags ===
Aramean flag, developed in 1980 by Bahro Suryoyo

Chaldean flag, adopted in late 1999

Tricolor used by the Syriac Union Party and Syriac Military Council claims for itself representing Assyrian-Syriac people in SDF-controlled Northern Syria

== See also ==
- Roomrama
