= George Malek-Yonan =

Assyrian lawyer, politician and athlete

George Malek-Yonan (1924-2014) was an Iranian Assyrian international attorney, politician and athlete, and father of actress Rosie Malek-Yonan.

== Biography ==
The Assyrian Malek family claims to trace its roots back eleven centuries. During the Assyrian genocide of 1914–1918, Malek-Yonan's family fled to Baghdad, in the Great Exodus from Urmia where he was born on 11 October 1924. When still a young child, his family migrated back to Iran and finally settled in Tehran. His parents were Yosip (Joseph) and Suriya, both Assyrian. His older sister, Florence, was Knighted in the early 70s and lived in Switzerland where she died on 18 February 2007. His older brother, David, was an engineer in Iran who built many of Iran's major freeways and roadways as well as numerous silos in Russia. His younger brother, Cyrus, left Iran for England when he was only seventeen to study at the Royal Academy of Dramatic Arts in London and eventually settled in Paris.

Malek-Yonan married Lida Bet-Benyamin, also of Assyrian descent, in Tehran in 1950 and has two daughters: Monica Malek-Yonan and Rosie Malek-Yonan, the author of The Crimson Field and also a cast member of the long-running television series General Hospital.

Malek-Yonan studied at Tehran University's Law School, earning a Law Degree in 1946 and a Degree in Political Science in 1947. In 1964 he studied law at Golden Gate Law School in San Francisco, California. He practiced international law for more than fifty years representing many of the American, European and Asian corporations in Iran. He was the attorney for the U.S. Embassy in Tehran during the American hostage takeover. He moved to the U.S. after the Iranian Revolution.

The Malek-Yonan family has produced many great sons and daughters. Dr. Jesse Malek-Yonan represented the Assyrians of Urmia at the Paris Peace talks in 1919; Milton Malek-Yonan inventor of Malekized Rice; Shushan Malek-Yonan author of a children's book (1927) published in Tabriz, Iran; Rev. Isaac Malek-Yoninan author of several books and essays including The Beloved Physician of Teheran (1933) and Persian Women (1898); Norman Malek-Yonan author of The Christmas Story (1958); Terrence Malick, Oscar-nominated director and writer of The New World (2005), The Thin Red Line (1998), Days of Heaven (1978), Badlands (1973).

Malek-Yonan died on 14 November 2014 in California.

== Sports ==
Three gold medals presented at Mar-Mar Palace in Tehran by the former Shah of Iran, Mohammad Reza Pahlavi, earned George Malek-Yonan the title of Champion of Champions in Iranian Sports in the fields of track and field, pentathlon and soccer, bringing the total of medals awarded to him to 47. His brother, David, was also awarded numerous gold medals by the Shah.

Malek-Yonan played high school soccer, basketball and volleyball. After a chance encounter with Iran's track and field coach, Ahmad Izadpanah, at Amjadieh Stadium (today known as Shahid Shiroudi Stadium), Malek-Yonan became interested in track and field. In 1934 Izadpanah had begun organizing various track and field meets and by 1936, the Iranian Athletics Federation was established and Iran joined the International Amateur Athletics Federation.

Malek-Yonan first competed in the long jump and triple jump in 1944 (1323) where he earned two silver medals. The same year he participated in Iran's University competitions in the long jump, the triple jump, javelin and shot put, earning four more silver medals.

While studying law at Tehran University, he won a gold medal in table tennis in 1946 (1325) and was a member of the University of Tehran Soccer, Volleyball and Basketball teams.

Malek-Yonan was the most decorated athlete at Iran's 1948 (1327) National Athletic Competitions, earning him the title of Champion of Champions. He was the only athlete in 1948 to have received a gold medal as well as winning the Track and Field Cup. He competed in the pentathlon (2 x 100 meters, 1,500 meters, javelin, discus and long jump), as well as the 100 meters, 200 meters and long jump, winning four gold medals and earning first place at the 1948 Olympic Games Qualifiers. However he did not compete at the Olympics.

=== Records ===
Malek-Yonan's 1948 (1327) record:

- 100 Meters, 11/5 Seconds, Event: National Championship, Gold Medal
- 200 Meters, 24/4 Seconds, Event: National Championship, Gold Medal
- Long Jump, 7/55 Meters, Event: National Championship, Gold Medal
- Pentathlon, 2305, Event: National Championship, Gold Medal

Malek-Yonan's 1950 (1329) record:

- Long Jump, 6/43 Meters, Event: National Championship
- At the Eastern Mediterranean Cup Championship he took the bronze medal in the 200 Meters, but came in fifth place in the Long Jump and Triple Jump.

== Politics ==
A leading international attorney, George Malek-Yonan was responsible for procuring a seat for Assyrians as a recognized minority in the Iranian Parliament, thus giving Assyrians a political voice in Iran.

== See also ==
- Assyrians in Iran
- List of Assyrians
- List of people from Tehran
