= Emanuel Kamber =

Emanuel Yousif Kamber is an Assyrian physics professor at Western Michigan University and was the Secretary General of the Assyrian Universal Alliance. He was born in the small Assyrian village of Darbandokeh in Iraq.

== Biography ==
In 1983, Emanuel Kamber earned a Ph.D. and Doctors degree in physics from University of London in England. He studies and conducts experiments involving electron capture, ionization and excitation processes in low-velocity collisions among atoms, ions and molecules. Emanuel has published over 70 widely referenced papers in scientific journals and has presented more than 90 papers at National and International Conferences on Atomic Physics. He has been a research associate at the Royal Society Research Unit, University College of Swansea in the United Kingdom & Kansas State University, and a visiting professor at Kansas State University. He has mentored 4 master theses and 2 Ph.D. dissertations.

== See also ==
- Assyrian Universal Alliance
