= Fawzi Hariri =

Iraqi politician (born 1958)

Fawzi Franso Toma Hariri

Minister of Industry of Iraq
- In office 2006–2010
- President: Jalal Talabani
- Prime Minister: Nouri al-Maliki
- Preceded by: Mohammed Tofiq Rahim
- Succeeded by: Ahmad Nasser Dali Al-Karbouli
- Parliamentary group: Democratic Patriotic Alliance of Kurdistan

Chief of Staff of the Iraqi Ministry of Foreign Affairs
- In office 2003–2005

Personal details
- Born: 1958 (age 67–68) Arbil, Iraq
- Party: Democratic Patriotic Alliance of Kurdistan
- Other political affiliations: Assyrian Universal Alliance, Assyrian National Congress
- Occupation: Politician

Fawzi Franso Toma Hariri (born 1958 in Arbil, Iraq) is an Assyrian politician and former Iraq Minister of Industry.

Despite inaccurately being labeled as Kurdish throughout different media reports, Hariri is of Assyrian origin and son of the politician Franso Hariri (1937–2001). For 24 years, Fawzi lived in London where he was active in Assyrian, Kurdish, and Iraqi politics. He is a founding member of BNDP - Iraq, and a former member of the Assyrian National Congress (ANC) and the Assyrian Universal Alliance (AUA).

He was appointed Iraq's Minister of Industry and served from 2006-2010, after being elected in the December 2005 elections as a member of the Democratic Patriotic Alliance of Kurdistan. Prior to that, he was a Senior Diplomat and Chief of Staff of Iraq's Ministry of Foreign Affairs (2003-2005).

An attempt on his life in October 2006 killed three bodyguards and injured 11 others, though Mr. Hariri was not in the traveling convoy at the time of the explosions. The attack in Baghdad occurred in the Assyrian Quarter of Dora, where twin car bombs went off within minutes.
