= Milton Malek-Yonan =

Milton Malek-Yonan (1904–2002) was an Assyrian entrepreneur and inventor.

== Biography ==
Milton Malek-Yonan was born to Assyrian parents in Urmia, Iran in 1904. He was a descendant of one of the oldest and most prominent Assyrian families, the Malek family or tribe that came from Assyrian village of Geogtapah, Urmi, a region in Northwestern Iran. The family dates back nearly eleven centuries. Malek-Yonan grew up in Richmond, Virginia and later moved to Oak Park, Illinois, and finally retired and settled in Carmel, California with his wife, Dr. Ingmar Malek-Yonan, a professor of German Studies at University of California at Berkeley and Stanford University who died in 2007. Malek-Yonan died at his home in Carmel at the age of 98. His father, Rev. Isaac Malek-Yonan was a published author. Malek-Yonan had five siblings including a twin sister, Ann. His relative is a famous actress, author, director, public figure and activist Rosie Malek-Yonan.

== Malekized Rice ==
In 1938 Malek-Yonan discovered that millions of pounds of rice was being wasted in California's Sacramento Valley because the United States was no longer exporting rice to Japan due to the embargo on Japan for attacking China. The U.S. rice trade was in serious trouble. Being from the Middle East, Malek-Yonan wondered why more Americans didn't use rice instead of allowing it to go to waste.

Malek-Yonan discovered that the problem was that the average American was not accustomed to cooking rice in those days. When they did, it would come out sticky and messy. This gave Malek-Yonan the idea of canning the rice which proved to be quite a challenge. Working with a canning factory, Malek-Yonan began numerous experiments. But his efforts failed. Refusing to accept failure, he continued his research and soon discovered that there were about 2,000 varieties of rice. Malek-Yonan soon discovered that the natives of Assam in India grew a particular kind of rice called Patna. Before milling it while still in its hulls, the Patna rice was boiled and spread to dry. What made this rice also distinct from rice of other regions was that it was virtually disease free. The combination of the boiling of the rice and the absence of disease intrigued Malek-Yonan enough to continue with his experiments.

Malek-Yonan contacted the Rice Experimental Station of the State Agriculture College at Biggs in California's Sacramento Valley for paddies of rice with the husks intact. Then he persuaded a local hospital to allow him to use a sterilization vat to steam the rice in. The rice was then spread for several hours outdoors to dry before it was ready for milling. He borrowed a hand mill from a scientist who happened to own one from his Asian travels. The final step was to take the rice to the laboratory of a canning company to be canned. When he opened the cans several days later, he discovered that each kernel separated beautifully.

Malek-Yonan had discovered the secret of canning rice but after meeting with a patent attorney, he realized he didn't have the funding necessary for a chemical analysis that was required to register his invention. Malek-Yonan did not look at this as a setback, instead he found a chemist who agreed to do the rice analysis. In exchange Malek-Yonan took on the task of feeding the chemist's animals.

The chemical analysis revealed that the rice had retained its vitamins and after the Rice Growers Association did further official analysis for the next nine months, it was up to the public to accept the Malekized Rice which had been converted to a dry processed rice. The rice retained up to 65 percent of the thiamine (Vitamin B_{1}) of raw brown rice and 80 percent of pantothenic acid and more than double the vitamin content of ordinary polished rice. Malek-Yonan's process of steam pressure-cooking rice in its husks forced the vitamins out of the bran and into the kernel itself. Most importantly, the germs in the end of the kernel that forced the rice to germinate were sterilized. Additionally, the bran oil disintegrated, hardening the kernel surface thus making it virtually disease proof since the weevils could no longer penetrate it.

When World War II broke out, Malek-Yonan quickly suggested his Malekized Rice to the army and 5,000 bags of processed rice were shipped to the Pacific. To meet the army's demand for more dry processed rice, Malek-Yonan convinced the General American Transportation Corporation of Chicago to design and build huge pressure steamers, rotary driers and coolers needed to process the rice. A processing plant was built in Sacramento with the help of the California Rice Growers Association and by the end of the war the completed plant was operational.

Malek-Yonan licensed General American Transportation Corporation and other agencies worldwide to manufacture processors and license mills everywhere under his patent as Uncle Ben's Rice or Golden Pearl Rice.

In later life, Malek-Yonan advocated the use of adobe in construction.

== See also ==
- List of Assyrians
