= Dustin Kahia =

American film director, screenwriter, and producer

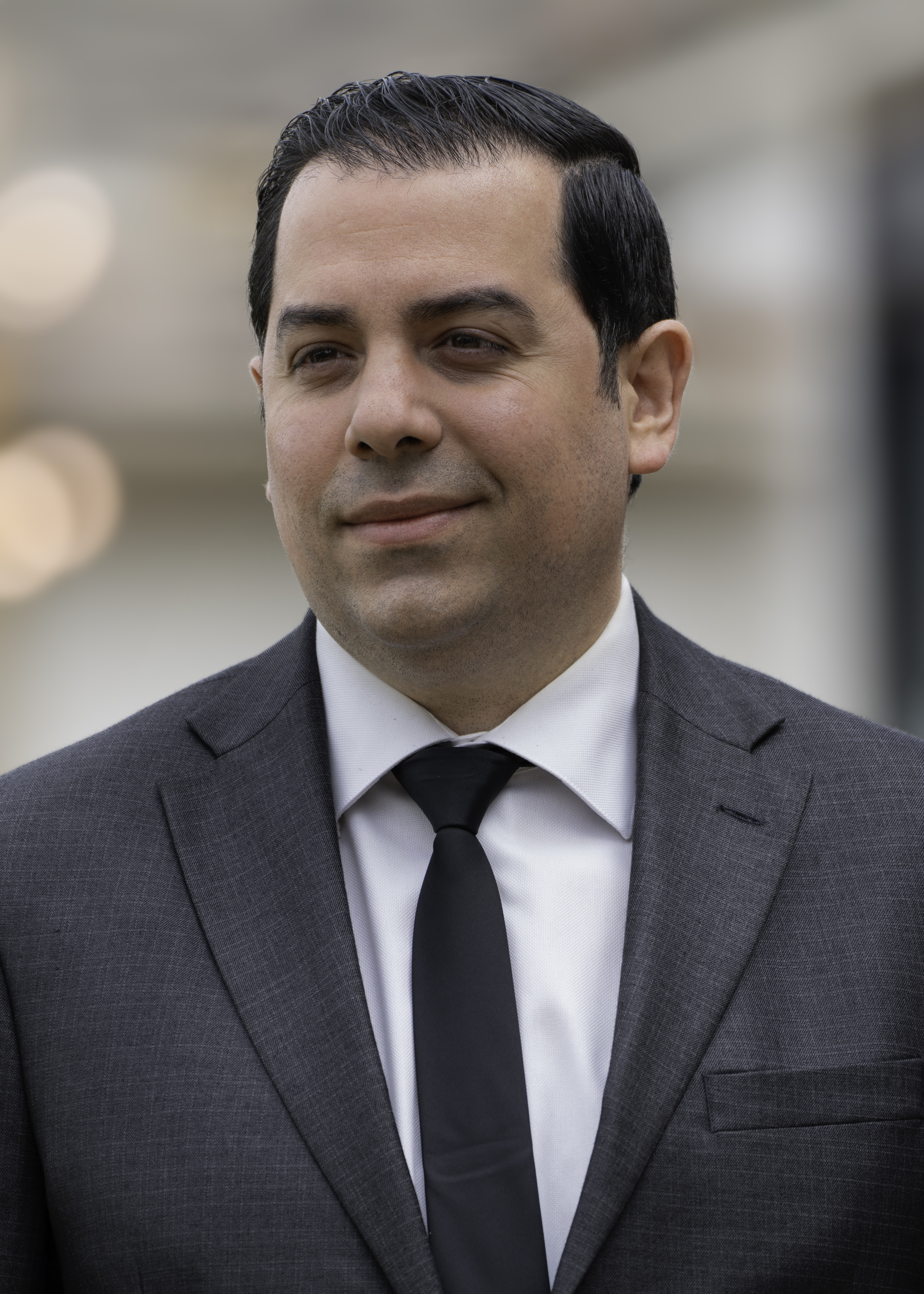
- Kahia in 2024
- Born: June 12, 1989 (age 37); San Diego, California, United States
- Occupations: Film director, screenwriter, producer
- Years active: 2008–present

Dustin Thomas Kahia (born June 12, 1989), known professionally as Dustin Kahia, is an American film director, screenwriter, and producer. He is best known for writing and directing the film Call of the Void (2016).

== Early life and background ==
Kahia was born on June 12, 1989, in San Diego, California. He is Chaldean (potentially of Babylonian, ethnic Assyrian or broader Mesopotamian ancestry). Kahia developed an early interest in filmmaking while using video editing software during his father's cancer treatment. His passion for film also served as a coping mechanism following his father's passing at age 14 and the subsequent loss of support from other family members. He also made home movies with his father's camera and, during his high school years, began creating narrative short films.

== Career ==
=== 2010–2020: Early career ===
Kahia began his career making short films. While some of his earliest work dates back to 2008, his first publicly released short film was Masterpieces, followed by Valediction. Both films premiered at the Newport Beach Film Festival, with Masterpieces screening in 2010 and Valediction in 2012. In an interview with Orange Country Films, Kahia stated that Masterpieces was filmed in four days, with a total budget of $5,000 allocated for travel and other smaller production expenses.

Valediction, starring Samuel Page, Italia Ricci, Eyal Podell, Bonnie Bartlett, and James Avery, gained wider recognition than Kahia's previous films. It won the "Human Condition" Audience Choice Award at the National Film Festival for Talented Youth in 2012. Media coverage included a review by Autumn McAlpin of the OC Register, who described the film as featuring "beautiful cinematography and a proficient cast."

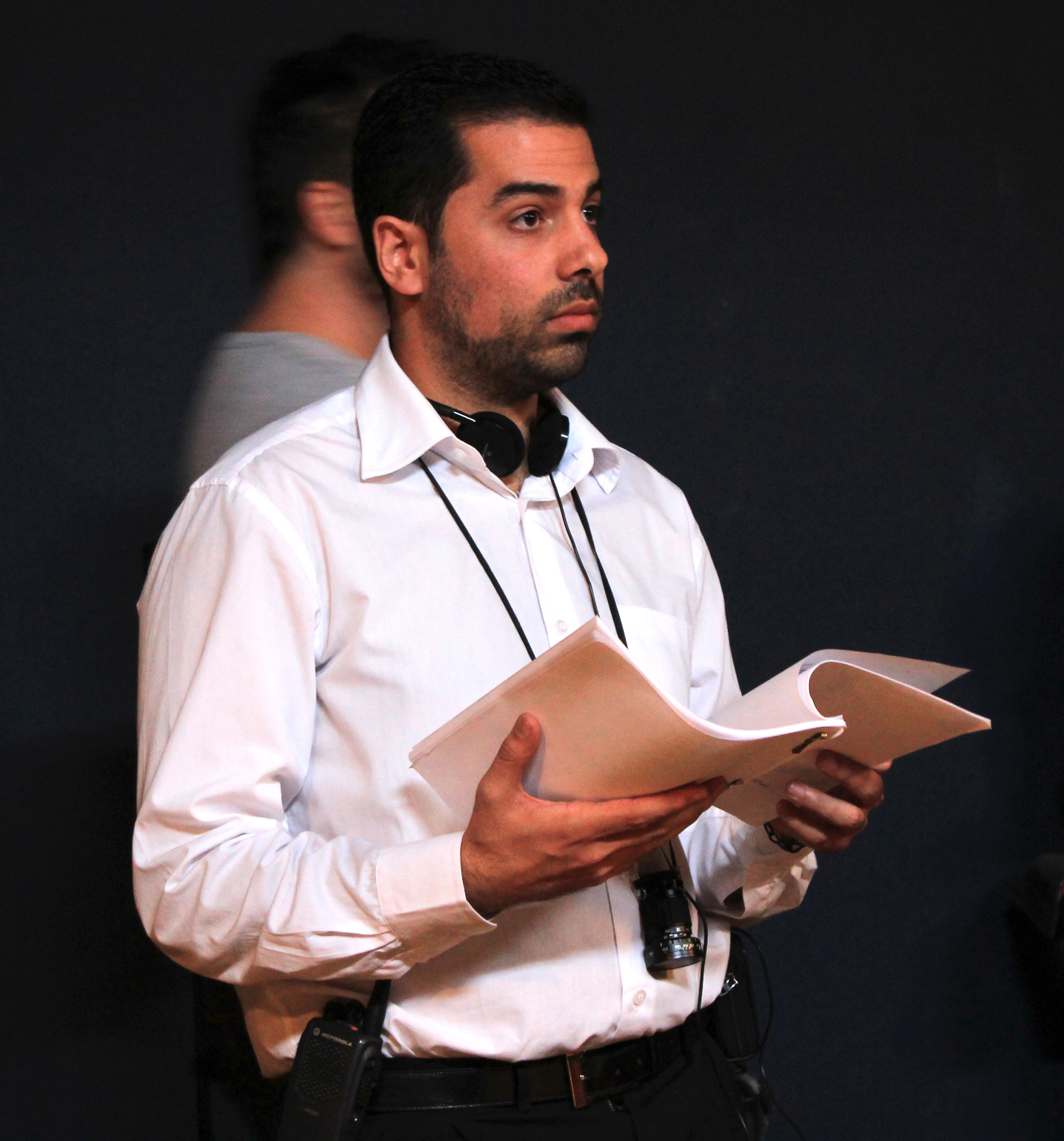
Kahia on the set of "Call of the Void" in 2014.

In August 2014, Kahia launched a 30-day Kickstarter campaign to fund Call of the Void, originally envisioned as a feature-length film but ultimately completed with a 55-minute runtime due to creative and production constraints. The noir-style psychological thriller premiered at the 2016 Newport Beach Film Festival, marking Kahia's third film at the event. Shot in just four days around downtown Los Angeles, the production required extensive planning, as actors had limited takes, with sets built from scratch and filming at locations like the La Cienega oil fields. Critics praised the film's cinematography and noir influences, drawing comparisons to Alfred Hitchcock, Fritz Lang, Anatole Litvak, and Otto Preminger. Kahia described it as an exploration of obsession and attachment, examining how unhealthy fixation can lead to downfall.

Returning to the National Film Festival for Talented Youth to provide an interview, Kahia described his inspiration for the story of the film as wanting to pay homage to the visual-narrative style of classical cinema and the Golden Age of Hollywood. He also reflected on the challenges of securing funding and filming within a limited timeframe.

=== 2020–present: Recent work ===
In 2021–2022, Kahia directed the short film Monday Mourning, starring Dominic Bogart and Claire Haller. The film follows Bogart's character, Daniel, as he struggles to reconcile a troubled past with an uncertain future after returning home from a prolonged absence.

The film was subsequently recognized and received awards at the International Motion Picture Awards (IMPA), where Kahia won Best Director and Dominic Bogart won Best Lead. The Best Director award marked Kahia's first win in this category. The film also won 6 awards out of 13 nominations that it had received as of March 2024, and was screened at the 2022 Beverly Hills Film Festival.

In 2024, it was reported that Kahia was developing his feature directorial debut, Crosspoint, a sci-fi thriller co-written with Tian Kok.

== Awards and nominations ==
Year	Award	Category	Work	Result	Ref
2012	National Film Festival for Talented Youth	Audience Award	Valediction	Won	
2016	Screencraft Sci-Fi Screenplay Contest		Tumble	Nominated	
2019	Independent Short Awards	Best Student Short	Rewind	Won	
2023	Cal Film Festival	Best Student Film	Monday Mourning	Won	
2023	Cal Film Festival	Best Male Director	Monday Mourning	Won	
2024	Istanbul International Spring Film Festival	Best Student Short	Monday Mourning	Won	
2024	International Motion Picture Awards	Best Director	Monday Mourning	Won	
2024	Always Late TV Movie Awards	Best Actor in a Short Film	Monday Mourning	Won	

== Filmography ==
Year	Film				
Year	Film	Director	Writer	Producer	Notes
2008	Moral Ecstasy	Yes	Yes	Yes	Short Film
2009	Looks Can Be Deceiving	Yes	Yes	Yes	Short Film
2009	My Name is Jake	Yes	Yes	Yes	Short Film
2010	Masterpieces	Yes	Yes	Yes	Short Film
2011	Valediction	Yes	Yes	Yes	Short Film
2016	Call of the Void	Yes	Yes	Yes	Short Film
2019	Rewind	Yes	Yes	Yes	Short Film
2019	Contra	Yes	Yes	Yes	Short Film
2021	Monday Mourning	Yes	Yes	Yes	Short Film
