= Ivan Kakovitch =

Ivan Kakovitch (December 9, 1933, in Kiev, USSR – December 22, 2006, in Paris, France) was an Assyrian author, journalist, professor, and a nationalist leader. He wrote the Assyrian manifesto and the novel Mount Semele.

An ethnic Assyrian, Ivan's family fled the Assyrian homeland in Iraq, during the Simele massacre of August 1933. The massacre would be a topic that Ivan would be obsessed with all his life.

In 1938, at the age of 5, Ivan’s family moved to Kazakhstan, where he began primary school. In 1944, the family moved again, but this time back to an Assyrian community in Tehran, Iran. In Iran, he attended San Louis French Parochial school, with his two brothers, Thoma and Shurik. In 1956, at the age of 23, Ivan traveled to France and studied classical literature. A few years later, he moved to Strasburg, to further his education in the classics. In 1959, at the age of 26, Ivan moved to Washington, D.C. and obtained work at the Berlitz School of Languages. He taught Russian, French, and Persian. He also worked at the Voice of America simultaneously, interpreting and translating in Russian, French, and Persian. Ivan was also unique within the Assyrian community for his atheist belief system. As he expressed in his famous novel, Mount Semele, Ivan could never conceive the fact that there was yet another life after this one.

Ivan became well known in the late 1970s, when he wrote the Assyrian Manifesto; a blue print for the formation of an Assyrian interim government. Ivan presented the manifesto at the yearly Assyrian congress gathering in Chicago. Political groups such as the Assyrian Universal Alliance and the Bet Nahrain Democratic Party were enthusiastic and supportive of Ivan's blueprint. It was decided at that meeting that Ivan would be sent back to Washington to set up an office for the International Confederation of Assyrian Nation (ICAN). Many of the Assyrian political organizations did support the ICAN office financially, but after just a few short months, Ivan was told that they could not support the project financially anymore.

Residing in Cypress, California, Ivan finally finished writing the story he was obsessed with from birth, writing the novel Mount Semele in 2001. The Simele Massacre of the Assyrian people, impacted not only Ivan’s family, who were forced to flee their village in Iraq, moving from country to country, but affected Ivan’s own personal life, as well. On December 21, 2006, while vacationing in France, Ivan died surprisingly, despite not having too many health problems throughout his life. He was interred on Tuesday, January 9, 2007, at Forest Lawn Cemetery in Los Angeles.

== Works ==
- Mount Semele (Mandrill, 2001) ISBN 1-931633-70-3
