= Tiras Odisho =

Assyrian Iraqi martial artist

Personal information
- Native name: ܬܝܪܣ ܥܒܕܝܫܘܥ
- Nationality: Iraqi
- Citizenship: Swedish

Tiras Odisho is an ethnic Assyrian former martial arts practitioner and expert who has served as the Director General of the National Olympic Committee of Iraq. Odisho currently resides in Sweden.
