= Yosip Bet Yosip =

Assyrian poet

Rabi Yosip Bet Yosip (Assyrian: ܝܵܘܣܸܦ ܒܹܝܬܼ ܝܵܘܣܸܦ ) is an Assyrian poet. He was born in 1942 in the village of Zoomalan in Urmia, Iran. He is known for writing the de-facto Assyrian national anthem, Roomrama.

== Organizations ==
He joined several Assyrian organizations:

- Shooshata Umtanaia (The Society of Assyrian National Progress - Assyrian Youth Organization)

He assisted Shooshata Umtanaia in assembling the first and largest library of Assyrian books ever collected in modern Assyrian history.

- Nineveh Choir (1960, Tehran)

Nineveh Choir was conducted by maestro Nebu Issabey in Tehran.

- Sita Sapreyta (Assyrian Youth Cultural Society)

== Composed poems ==
- Mawd'anuta
- Sluta D-Atouraya D-Idyum
- Sluta D-Burakha
- Atwatè Rushma D-Lishana
- Maqruta L-'ohdana D-Yimmi
- Bèt Nisanè
- Ganta D-Alaha
- Dam‘ita D-Ishtar
- Tèra D-Madinkha
- Martyanuta D-Ninwè Yimma
- Ba‘uta D-Yimma
- Ba‘uta D-Ninwayè
- Qala D-Umta
- Talga D-Turanè D-Hakkarè
- Quyama Dikhya
- Wardè D-Kitwè
- Ktuta Nqirta L-Qayè
- Brata D-Sahda Gu Ma‘irwa
- Bèblè D-Go Lèlawatè
- Ani D-Ki Khayyi ‘am Alaha
- Mhadyanè Sniqè
- Madrashta D-Nsiwin

== See also ==
- Paulus Khofri
- William D. S. Daniel
