= Fuat Deniz =

Swedish sociologist and writer

- Born: 24 July 1967; Dargeçit, Tur Abdin, Turkey
- Died: 13 December 2007 (aged 40); Örebro, Sweden
- Cause of death: stabbing at Örebro University two days before death
- Occupations: sociologist, writer, lecturer in sociology at the Department of Social and Political Sciences at Örebro University
- Known for: co-founder, Assyrian Youth Federation in Sweden; his research on the Assyrian genocide
- Notable work: see Works

Fuat Deniz (Syriac: ܦܘܐܕ ܕܢܝܙ; 24 July 1967 – 13 December 2007) was a Swedish sociologist and writer of Assyrian descent. Until his murder in 2007, he worked as a lecturer in sociology at the Department of Social and Political Sciences at Örebro University.

Deniz was born as the oldest son into an Assyrian family in the village of Dargeçit in Tur Abdin, Turkey. He came to Sweden with his parents as an eight-year-old and grew up in Örebro. In his youth he was active in the Assyrian Youth Federation in Sweden, which he also co-founded, and was also a diligent writer for the Swedish National Assyrian Federation's magazine Hujådå. He earned a Ph.D. in sociology at Uppsala University in 1999. In his doctoral thesis, titled En minoritets odyssé ("The Odyssey of a Minority"), he discussed the experiences of Assyrians coming to Sweden in the 1970s. Deniz was a well-known figure among the Assyrian community in Sweden and was also internationally known for his research on the Assyrian genocide.

On 11 December 2007, at approximately 15.30 CET, Deniz was attacked and stabbed in the back of his neck inside Örebro University. He died two days later from his injuries at Örebro University Hospital. Early on there were some speculations in the media about a possible political motive behind the murder due to Deniz' research on the Assyrian genocide. On 16 January 2008, a 42-year-old man from Gothenburg, Sweden, was arrested on suspicion for the murder. The suspect, who according to the police is a close relative of Deniz, has admitted to the stabbing but denied any intent to kill. The police said that an old feud between the two family members was the most likely motive for the killing and ruled out any political connections.

== Works ==
- Deniz, Fuat; Perdikaris, Antonios (1990). Ett liv mellan två världar : en studie om hur assyriska ungdomar som andra generationens invandrare i Sverige upplever och hanterar sin livssituation. Örebro: Örebro University. ISBN 91-7668-251-X.
- Deniz, Fuat; Freyne-Lindhagen, Marianne; Ulfvensjö, Lars (1991). Flyktingar i Norberg, FINO-projektet : en utvärdering av det kommunala flyktingmottagandet. Örebro: Örebro University.
- Deniz, Fuat (1992). Kulturmöten : en utvärdering av projektet Kulturmöten i Vallby/Pettersberg i Västerås. Örebro: Örebro University. ISBN 91-7668-122-X.
- Deniz, Fuat (1993). Utbildning : vägen till framtiden : assyriernas utbildningstraditioner i Sverige. Gothenburg: Assyrian Association in Bergsjön.
- Deniz, Fuat (1995). Medvetande och identitet i det medialiserade samhället : en kritisk diskussion och analys av Meads och Berger/Luckmanns socialisationsteori utifrån nya tekniska och symboliska villkor för sociala relationer samt för medvetande- och identitetsutveckling. Uppsala: Uppsala University.
- Deniz, Fuat (1995). Flykten från verkligheten till jagets högborg : en kritisk tolkning och analys av New Age utifrån Durkheims sociologi. Uppsala: Uppsala University.
- Deniz, Fuat (1999). En minoritets odyssé : upprätthållande och transformation av etnisk identitet i förhållande till moderniseringsprocesser : det assyriska exemplet. Uppsala: Uppsala University. ISBN 91-628-3759-1.
