= Rosie Malek-Yonan =

American novelist, actress (born 1965)

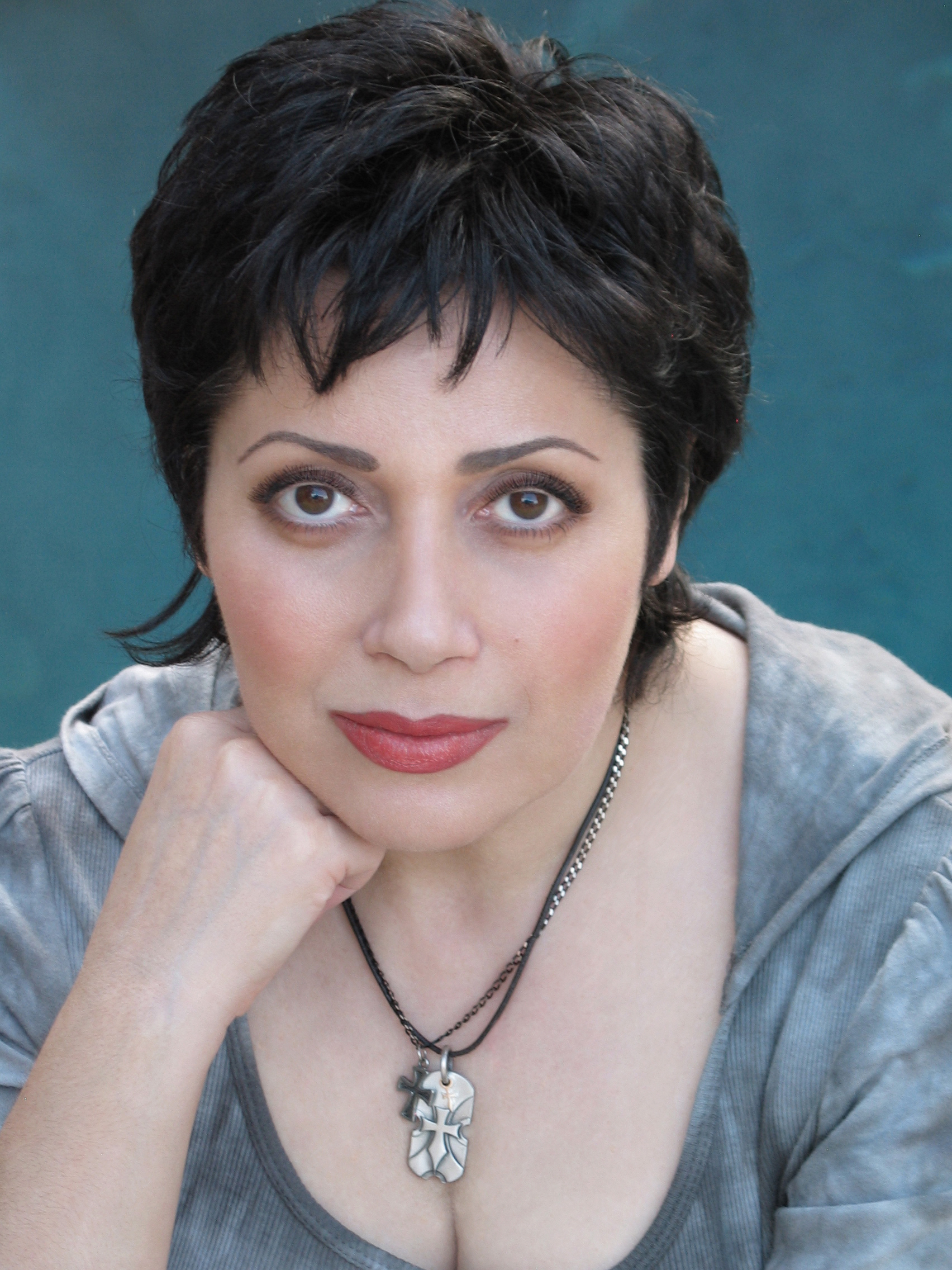
- Rosie Malek-Yonan (2008)
- Born: July 4, 1965 (age 60); Tehran, Iran
- Citizenship: United States
- Occupations: Actress; author; director
- Website: www.rosiemalek-yonan.com

Rosie Malek-Yonan (born July 4, 1965) is an Assyrian-American actress, author, director, public figure and activist. Malek-Yonan became a noted pianist at an early age. Having graduated from the University of Cambridge, she settled in the United States, where she pursued a career in music and dramatic arts. As an actress she appeared in well over 30 films and television series, including Up Close & Personal (1996) and Rendition (2007), as well as, among others, Generations, Dynasty, CSI: Miami, JAG, ER and Babylon 5.

She also authored The Crimson Field, a historical novel set in the times of the Assyrian genocide during World War I; the book is one of the most popular pieces of prose among modern Assyrians.

== Early life and education ==
Malek-Yonan was born in Tehran, Iran. Malek-Yonan's father, George Malek-Yonan, was an international attorney in Iran. Malek-Yonan's mother, Lida Malek-Yonan was an activist who launched and presided over the Assyrian Women's Organization which was the only officially recognized charter member of the Iranian Women's Association until the end of the Pahlavi dynasty.

== Career ==
Malek-Yonan is a classically trained pianist, composer, actress, director, writer, documentary filmmaker and activist. She began studying piano at the age of four and while still in her teens, competed in and won many national piano competitions in Iran and attended the Tehran Conservatory of Music. In 1972 after winning a national piano competition in Iran, she was invited by Queen Farah Pahlavi to play at a Command Performance.

Upon receiving her L.C. degree in English from the University of Cambridge, she studied classical piano with Saul Joseph at the San Francisco Conservatory of Music, and acting with Ray Reinhardt at the American Conservatory Theater. A graduate of San Francisco State University with two degrees in Music, she won an invitation to study drama at the American Academy of Dramatic Arts and the historic Pasadena Playhouse. Her plays have been produced and performed on stage. In 2008 Malek-Yonan's one woman play, An Assyrian Exodus previewed in Hartford, Connecticut. The work is based on true family diaries written during the 1918 Great Exodus from Urmia, Iran. About the production, Janey Golani, of The Assyrian Star writes, "…presentations included those of Ms. Rosie Malek-Yonan which was filled with many emotional attendees who were struck by her performance of "An Assyrian Exodus" a dramatic staged reading based on Rosie's Family Diaries."

Reviewing Malek-Yonan's work as an actor and director, Martin Hernandez of LA Weekly writes, "Superbly acted and directed...Director Rosie Malek-Yonan honed the works to perfection, even down to the fitting choice of songs for transitions and intermission." About her stage directing, Bruce Feld writes, "Rosie Malek-Yonan has done an excellent job directing...top-of-the-line and what might have become a sketch in other hands becomes a poignant episode of universal import...exceptional direction.". In another review, Feld wrote, "Very well directed by Rosie Malek-Yonan...The material is very tricky, but Malek-Yonan handles it with requisite sensitivity, without in any way watering down the heavy conflict...Sparks ignite..."

Malek-Yonan made her television debut in 1983 on Aaron Spelling's television series, Dynasty, followed by a national commercial for AT&T where she spoke in Assyrian. She has since appeared in numerous notable television shows, films and plays, acting in a wide range of roles opposite many of Hollywood's leading actors. She has had recurring roles on Days of Our Lives, Chicago Hope, Beverly Hills, 90210, The Young and the Restless and in 2008 she joined the cast of ABC's General Hospital as Farah Mir. On Star Trek: Deep Space Nine she was Tekoa. She has guest starred on such shows as Generations, Seinfeld, Life and JAG. She played the role of Nuru Il-Ebrahimi, opposite Reese Witherspoon in New Line Cinema's Rendition, directed by Oscar-winning director Gavin Hood. The film premiered at the Toronto International Film Festival.

In 2015 Malek-Yonan joined the executive board of the Beverly Hills Film Festival as a consultant.

=== Human rights activism ===
Malek-Yonan is an outspoken advocate of issues concerning her people, in particular bringing attention to the Assyrian genocide as well as the plight of today's Assyrians in the Middle-East since the 2003 invasion of Iraq by the United States and its Coalition Forces. She has candidly criticized the U.S. for failure to protect the Christians in Iraq since the beginning of the 2003 Invasion of Iraq. In an interview with The New York Times Malek-Yonan said, "Anytime the Western countries go to war in the Middle East, it becomes a religious war…" In the interview she also held Kurdish commanders in Iraq responsible for "depriving the Christians of security in an effort to tilt the demographics in favor of Kurds. The expected result, she said, was an exodus of hundreds of thousands of Christians from Iraq. At least hundreds have been killed. One priest was quartered and beheaded."

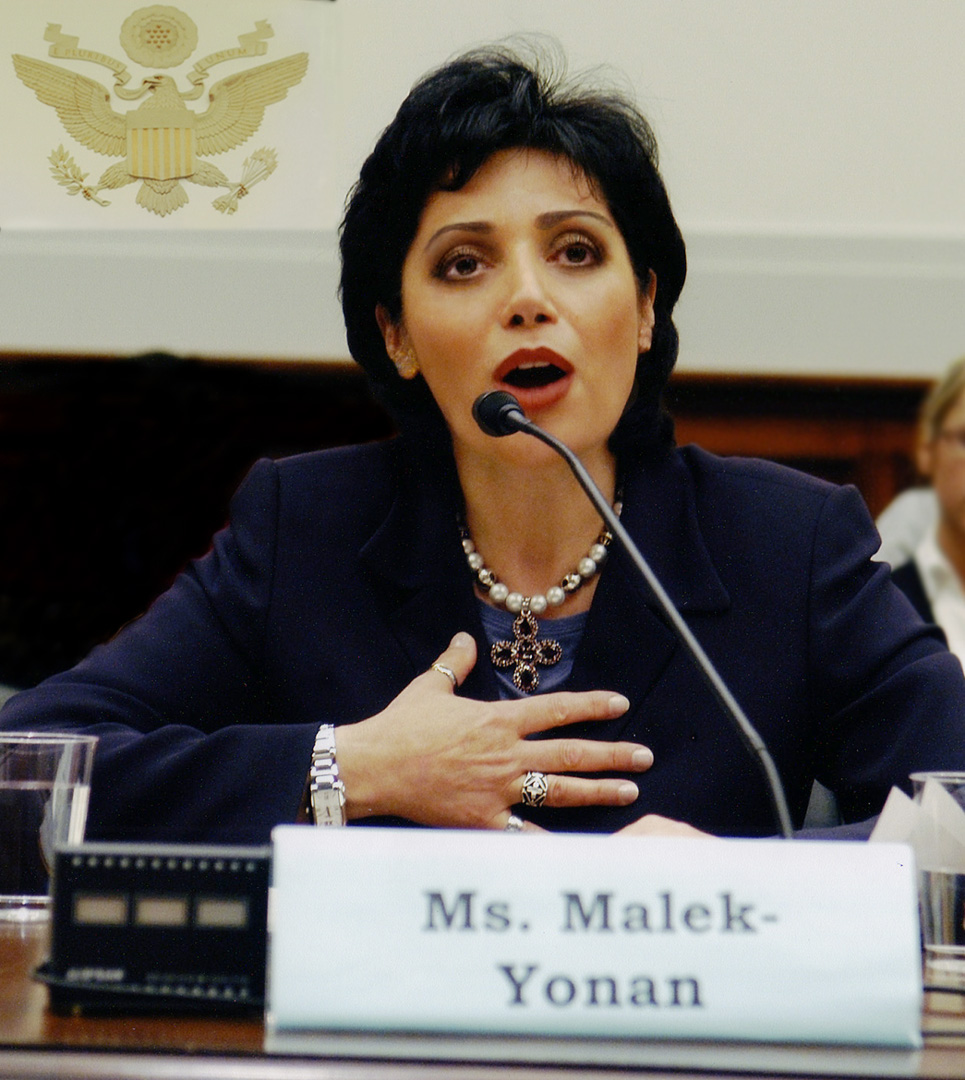
Congressional Testimony, June 30, 2006

On June 30, 2006, Rosie Malek-Yonan, was invited to testify on Capitol Hill before a Congressional Committee of the 109th Congress on religious freedom regarding the genocide, massacres and persecution of Assyrians in Iraq since the beginning of the 2003 Iraq War. Reading from her book, she compared the Assyrian genocide of 1914–1918, as depicted in The Crimson Field, to the current plight of the indigenous Assyrian Christians in Iraq. Her 30-minute testimony and plea to the U.S. government, ultimately prompted Congressman Chris Smith (R-NJ) to travel to war-torn Iraq to witness matters for himself. While in Iraq, after meeting with local Assyrians, he turned in Malek-Yonan's in depth report to U.S. officials in Iraq. One year later, a Congressional appropriations subcommittee voted to send $10 million to aid the Assyrians in Iraq. The complete archived transcript and webcast of the actual Congressional Testimony is available at the website of the U.S. House of Representatives.

Monica Malek-Yonan's documentary film, My Assyrian Nation on the Edge, based on Rosie Malek-Yonan's Congressional Testimony was released September 2006 (ISBN 0-9771873-0-6) in English. The film is released in Europe with French, German, Swedish and Dutch subtitles (ISBN 978-0-9771873-31). The Australian Premiere was on 7 August 2008, at the Australian Parliament of New South Wales in Sydney.

In 2008, Malek-Yonan addressed the topics of genocide, world peace and in particular the Assyrian genocide in statements presented at the British House of Lords on 12 March and on 24 April at the House of Commons of the United Kingdom.

On October 5, 2008, Malek-Yonan spoke on behalf of the Assyrian nation in Iraq at a Los Angeles rally held in front of the Federal Building to oppose the Iraq Election Law. She addressed the crowd of demonstrators and the media voicing her opposition at the removal of article 50 and its consequences for the minorities in Iraq in particular the Assyrians. "Democracy in Iraq will fail if it does not treat all members of its society equally under the law." She went on to say, "Assyrians have already paid a heavy price since the beginning of the Iraq War. The liberation of Iraqis must encompass all its citizens, including the Assyrians, and not just the Sunni, the Shi'ites and the Kurds.

Malek-Yonan is a public speaker and is often invited to lecture about the Assyrian genocide. On 24 February 2007, Malek-Yonan was a keynote speaker at an open forum in Anaheim, California, discussing the persecution of the Copts and the plight of Christians in the Middle East. She has lectured at University of California, Berkeley, University of California, Merced, and Woodbury University among others.

On December 20, 2010, Malek-Yonan, was invited by the Simon Wiesenthal Center Museum of Tolerance to speak at a press conference to address the escalating crisis and the deadly attacks on the Assyrians in Iraq. Later in an interview with Fox News, Malek-Yonan described how going to church is a game of Russian Roulette for the Assyrian Christians in Iraq. "They never know when they go to church, if that's going to be the last mass, the last moment of their lives." The press conference was prompted by the 31 October 2010 massacre at "The Lady of Salvation Church" in Baghdad.

=== Awards ===
In 2006, at the 73rd Annual Assyrian Convention in Chicago, Illinois, the Board of Advisors of the Assyrian American National Federation, Inc., Malek-Yonan was awarded Woman of the Year.

For her numerous contributions as an actress, artist, director, author and activist, in March 2008, Malek-Yonan was awarded for Excellence in Arts and Entertainment by the Iranian American Political Action Committee (IAPAC).

At the Assyrian Universal Alliance 26th World Conference in Sydney, Australia, Malek-Yonan was awarded "2009 Assyrian Woman of the Year" in recognition of her substantial contribution to advance the Assyrian national cause by promoting international recognition of the Assyrian genocide, her extensive efforts in conveying the needs of the Assyrians to the United States government, and achievements in providing individual service to the Assyrian community worldwide.

In 2014, at the 14th annual Beverly Hills Film Festival, Malek-Yonan's screenplay, The Crimson Field, cowritten with her sister, Monica Malek-Yonan, based on her book by the same title, won the Palme d'Or for best screenplay.

=== Charitable work ===
Malek-Yonan is a founding member of the Assyrian Cultural and Arts Society that has provided scholarships since 2005 to students at Woodbury University's Design School through an annual Assyrian Design Competition.

In 2009 Malek-Yonan became an ambassador for the Swedish-based organization, Assyrians Without Borders.

== Filmography ==
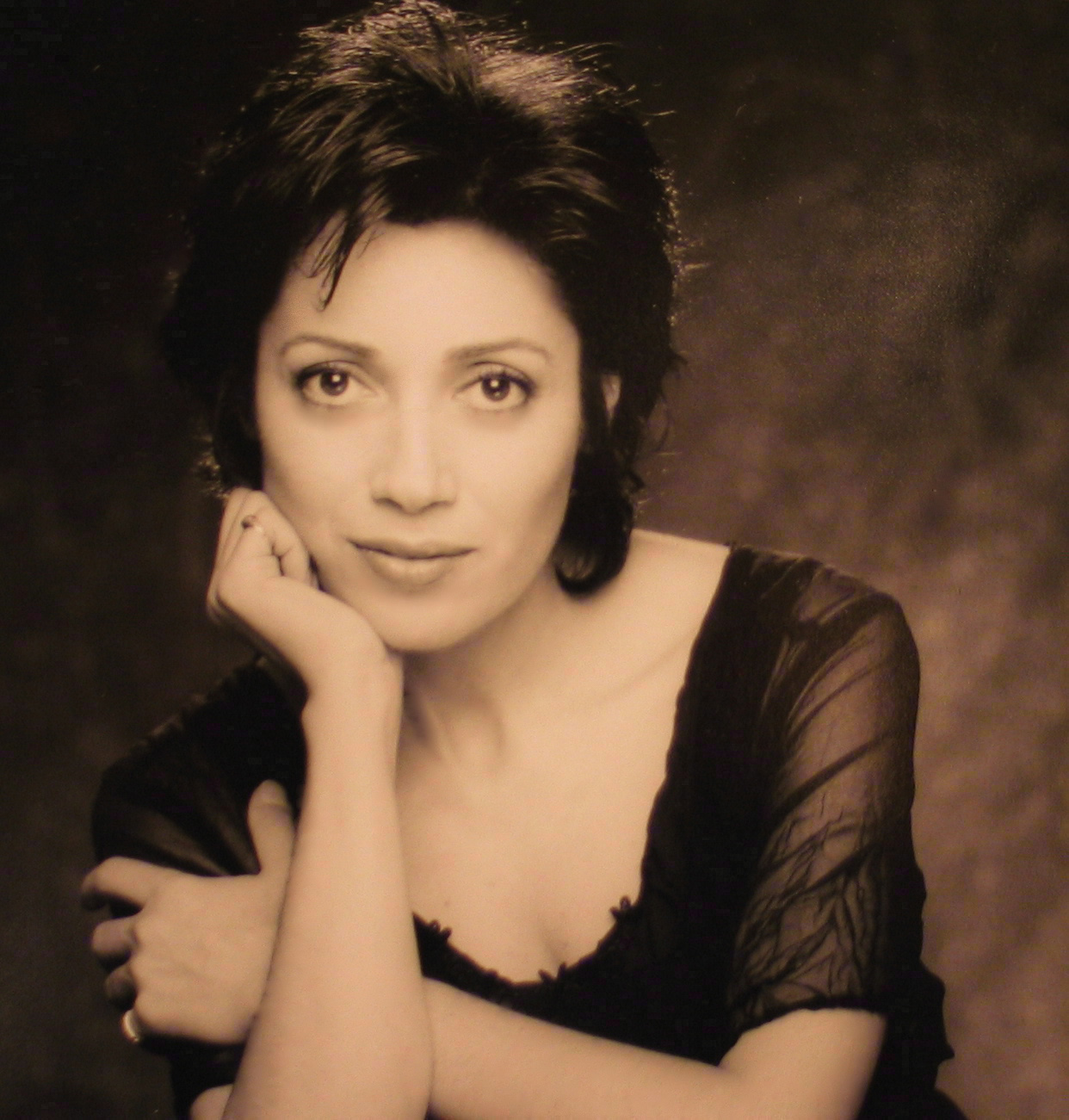
Rosie Malek-Yonan (2003)

=== Films ===
Year	Title	Role
1980	Olives for Breakfast	Rosie
1980	Walking Among Angels	Angel
1990	Separate Rooms	Sophie
1996	Up Close & Personal	Agent
1996	For Goodness Sake II	four characters
2002	Anniversary	Maria
2005	Animal Stories	Maria
2007	Rendition	Nuru El-Ibrahimi

=== Documentary films ===
Year	Title	Role	Director/Notes
2010	Defying Deletion: The Fight Over Iraq’s Nineveh Plains	Herself	Winner 2011 Detroit Film Festival, 2011 Uptown Film Festival
2006	My Assyrian Nation on the Edge (ISBN 0-9771873-0-6)	Herself	Writer, Director, Composer, Co-executive Producer

=== Television series ===
Year	Title	Role
1982	Dynasty	Stewardess
1986	Capitol	Recurring role
1986	Santa Barbara	Guest Starring
1987, 1996	Days of Our Lives	Recurring role
1989	Murder, She Wrote	Air Levant Clerk
1989	Divorce Court	Terri Ahmadi
1990	Generations	Gretchen
1990	Cop Rock	Production Assistant
1991	Lethal Charm aka Her Wicked Ways	Iberian Airline Clerk
1991, 2008	General Hospital	Farah Mir, recurring role
1995	NYPD Blue	Ackama
1995	Babylon 5 ("Confessions and Lamentations")	Doctor
1996	Star Trek: Deep Space Nine	Tekoa
1997	The Visitor	Maria
1997	Diagnosis: Murder	Claudia Mores
1998	Beverly Hills, 90210	Recurring/Barbara
1998	Profiler	Roya
1998	Seinfeld	Mrs. Phil
1996, 1997, 1999	Chicago Hope	Cindy Grey, recurring role
1999	St. Michael's Crossing ("CBS Pilot")	Wife
1999	Melrose Place	Doctor
1999	Entertainment Tonight	Self
1999, 2003	The Young and the Restless	Fadel, recurring role
2000	The Practice	Lambert
2001	Three Sisters ("NBC Pilot")	Arab Woman
2002	CSI: Miami	Receptionist
2002	JAG	multiple episodes
2007	Life	Roya Darvashi
2007	ER	Nazely
2008	Eli Stone	Nurse

== Stage credits ==
Title	Role	Theatre	Director	Notes/References
An Assyrian Exodus	Assyria	Hartford Marriott	Rosie Malek-Yonan	
William Saroyan's The Time of Your Life	Elsie	Pasadena Playhouse	Jill Mana Capps	
Tennessee Williams' Summer and Smoke	Alma	Pasadena Playhouse	Stan Zales	
Detective Story	Susan	Pasadena Playhouse	Darleen Duralia	
Bedfellows	Miranda Morales	Skylight Theatre	Chris Fields	World Premiere, Drama-Logue Award recipient, Critic's Pick
A Gentleman of Quality	Nicole	Ivar Theatre	Rosie Malek-Yonan	
Molière's Le Malade imaginaire The Imaginary Invalid	Toinette	Gallery Theatre	Rosie Malek-Yonan	
Speak!	Brandy	Theatre Geo	Dana Coen	World Premiere
Soft Dude	Doll	Theatre Geo	Rosie Malek-Yonan	Critic's Pick
Garrison Keillor's My Stepmother, Myself	Snow	Theatre Geo	Rosie Malek-Yonan	
Double Bound	Mori	Mise en Scène Theater	Herb Rogers	World Premiere
Once a Catholic	Mother Thomas Aquinas	Celtic Arts Center	Joe Premell	
The Light in the Mill	Nancy	Theatre Americana	Edgar Weinstock	World Premiere
Lies Like Truth	Denise	Theatre Americana	John Otrin	World Premiere
Stage Door	Olga	Charles Jehlinger Theatre	Lisle Wilson	
All Over Town	Millie	Charles Jehlinger Theatre	Ken McGee	

== Director credits ==
- The Assyrian - a documentary film
- My Assyrian Nation on the Edge
- Her Master's Voice - co-wrote with Monica Malek-Yonan - Radio Show
- The Imaginary Invalid - Gallery Theatre, Hollywood
- A Gentleman of Quality - co-wrote with Monica Malek-Yonan - Ivar Theatre, Hollywood
- A Matter of the Mind - En Scene Theatre, N. Hollywood
- Service Please Hold! (from 8x10) - Theatre Geo, Hollywood
- Soft Dude - Theatre Geo, Hollywood
- Correct Address - Theatre Geo, Hollywood
- The Ties That Bind - Theatre Geo, Hollywood
- My Stepmother, Myself - Theatre Geo, Hollywood

== Books ==
The Crimson Field is an historical and literary epic novel, set in Urmia, Iran, Russia and San Francisco, California. It is based on real events and true family chronicles set to the backdrop of the Assyrian genocide of 1914–1918 in the shadows of World War I where 750,000 Assyrians were massacred by the Ottoman Turks and Kurdish tribes in Ottoman Turkey and in the Assyrian inhabited region of Urmi (Urmia) in northwestern Iran. The book was selected as The Assyrian Event of the Year 2005 by Zinda magazine (22 April 2006). It was features in the Winter 2007's fourth issue of MAKE, a Chicago Literary Magazine and chosen as required reading by Professor Ellene Phufas for a World Literature class for the SUNY system (State University of New York) to represent a work about the Christian Genocides in Asia Minor.
