= Yuhanon Qashisho =

Assyrian-Swedish writer (1918–2001)

Yuhanon Qashisho (1918 in Esfes, Ottoman Empire – 2001 in Sweden) was a praised Assyrian author and poet. He is known in the Assyrian community as one of the greatest Assyrian writer in the past century. His writings created a power base from which many Assyrian political and cultural movements in Syria and Lebanon have emerged in the late 20th century. Malfono Qashisho's literary works in Assyrian language included over 200 poems, school texts, story books, and Assyrian-Swedish and Swedish-Assyrian dictionaries.

Born in 1918 to a priest, his family immediately fled to the south after his birth during the ongoing Assyrian genocide, to the Syrian town of Qamishli, joining the already big Assyrian community there.

In Qamishli, Qashisho went to a Syriac language-based school, where he was also taught Arabic and English. After graduation, he taught as a teacher in the same school for six years. He went on to become the principal of that same Assyrian school for three years, then moving on to another Assyrian school in Aleppo, becoming principal for another 5 years.

He wrote a series of schoolbooks in Assyrian for grade levels, which were published and printed in Qamishli and to the Assyrian villages nearby. With the help of Hanna Salman, Qashisho wrote one of the first books to teach the Assyrian language for the Junior High School students.

In 1940, Qashisho's family moved Palestine where his father was serving as the priest of the Parish of Bethlehem. There, he worked very actively serving Assyrian refugees. In 1948, he returned to Syria and spent most of his time teaching, writing and journalism. During his time in Syria, he wrote numerous poems published in many of the famous magazines including Assyria, The Syriac Pamphlet of Aleppo, The Assyrian Star and Huyodo. His most famous poem being "O l-Rehmat 'Idtan". He also wrote the popular Assyrian nationalistic anthem "Ho ‘Ohdinan (Dokrinan)" that was sung by the children of the Assyrian schools for many years in Qamishli.

In 1970, he emigrated to Sweden. In Sweden, he wrote a new series of books in Assyrian to teach the language to Swedish-born youths, titled Greetings Sweden. He wrote numerous versions of Swedish-Assyrian dictionaries throughout his time in Sweden. He died on 1 April 2001 in Södertälje.

== Work ==
1. Stories from the East
2. Shamiram
3. Dolabani
4. Sargon
5. Mor Afrem
6. Senharib
7. Hammurabi
8. Shamo is for which of them
9. July/Tamuz
10. Ishtar
11. The Tree of Raspberries
