= Nancy Oshana Wehbe =

Assyrian-American bodybuilder

Nancy Oshana Wehebe
- professional bodybuilder

Personal info
- Born: June 25, 1975 (age 49); Tell-Tamar, Syria

Best statistics

Professional (Pro) career
- Pro-debut: IFF Miss Bikini National overall 1st; 2000
- Best win: NPC Natural open class placed 1st; 2009
- Active: 2000–2012

Nancy Oshana Wehbe (born June 25, 1975) is a Syrian-American professional bodybuilder, who has competed in bodybuilding and bikini modeling from 2000 to 2012.

== Biography ==
Wehbe was born in Tell-Tamar, a small village in Syria. She was only ten years of age when her parents sent her and her older brother to live with their relatives in Chicago to receive an American education.

Wehbe, who is of Assyrian ethnicity, asserted her independence at a very young age and began working to support her schooling when she was only 15. She graduated with a Bachelors of Arts degree in International Business/Business Management. Upon graduation, Nancy started work at a Fortune 500 company, where she stayed for five years.

In the mid-1990s, she had begun an intense weight-training regiment. Immediately she noticed great results and received countless compliments. Not long after, she decided to compete at the official fitness and bodybuilding events. She trained hard and followed a strict nutritional diet prior to any competition.

Wehbe, who turned bodybuilder, has since turned every road block into a stepping stone by overcoming the frivolous impediment of cultural barriers and gender prejudices and has gained widespread respect and support for a hardcore competitive sport that requires fitness and modeling, both, in and out of her Assyrian community.

She became a Certified Personal Trainer by the American Council on Exercise (ACE).

== Awards and competitions ==
- 2012 NPC Junior Nationals Figure division D placed 10th
- 2012 NPC Illinois State Masters overall winner
- 2012 NPC Illinois State Masters 35-39 winner
- 2012 NPC Figure open placed 5th
- 2009 NPC Midwest Ironman placed 4th
- 2009 NPC Natural open class placed 1st
- 2003 INBJ Great Lakes Bodybuilding placed 2nd
- 2003 NPC Junior Nationals placed 16th
- 2002 NPC Junior Nationals placed 7th
- 2002 NPC Regional Midwest placed 1st
- 2002 NPC Regional Midwest overall winner
- 2001 NGA Natural Powerhouse placed 1st
- 2000 IFF Miss Bikini National overall winner
