= Eser Kardeşler =

Turkish footballer and manager

Personal information
- Date of birth: February 26, 1964 (age 62)
- Place of birth: Bursa, Turkey
- Position: Goalkeeper

Senior career*
Years	Team	Apps	(Gls)
1984–1990	Bursaspor	115	(0)
1990–1992	Aydınspor	54	(1)
1992–1993	Mersin	28	(0)
1993–1994	Dardanelspor	30	(0)
1994–1995	Kardemir Karabükspor	19	(0)
1996–1996	Yeni Salihlispor	31	(2)
1996–1997	Göztepe	6	(0)
1997–1999	Çorluspor	38	(0)
1998	Fırat Üniversitesi	2	(0)
1999–2001	Bursa Merinosspor	54	(0)
2001	Erzincanspor	14	(0)
2001–2003	Tavşancılspor	39	(0)
2003–2004	Akhisarspor	29	(0)
2004–2006	Bilecikspor	49	(0)

International career^{‡}
1981–1982	Turkey U18	17	(0)
1983–1985	Turkey U21	4	(0)

Managerial career
- 2014–2017: Niğde Anadolu FK
- 2018: Fethiyespor
- 2019: Nevşehir Belediyespor
- * Club domestic league appearances and goals as of 24 November 2019 ‡ National team caps and goals as of 24 November 2019

Eser Kardeşler (born 26 February 1964) is a Turkish football manager and player who played as a goalkeeper. Kardeşler was the main goalkeeper for Bursaspor in the 1980s, and had a long career afterwards in the lower divisions of Turkish football.

== Personal life ==
Kardeşler's son, Erce Kardeşler is also a professional footballer who plays as a goalkeeper. His other son Arda is a professional referee.
