= Mikhael K. Pius =

Assyrian historian (1927–2011)

- Born: Minashi Khammo Pius; 19 March 1927; Baghdad, Iraq
- Died: 9 January 2011 (aged 83); Modesto, California, USA
- Occupation: Author, historian
- Genre: History
- Subjects: Assyrian community in the RAF Habbaniya base

Mikhael K. Pius (19 March 1927 – 9 January 2011) was an author and Assyrian historian, principally on the Assyrian community on the old British Royal Air Force (RAF) base in Habbaniya, where the author had lived.

== Biography ==
Born Minashi Khammo Pius on 19 March 1927, in Khatun Camp, Baghdad. He was forced to change his name to Mikhael after the 17 July Revolution in 1968 that ushered in Baathist rule because authorities believed his birth name Minashi sounded ‘too Jewish’. He was son of Khammo Pius and Soriya Kakko of Mavana, Targawer, Persia, children of the tens of thousands of Christian Assyrians who agreed to fight on the side of the Allies. They had been forced by Ottoman forces to abandon their homelands in modern-day Turkey and Iran and flee to the safety of refugee camps in Mesopotamia during World War I.

Pius spent his childhood in Khatun Camp, Baghdad, and in the Maharatha Lines on the RAF Station Hinaidi, where he had his early education at Raabi Spania Shimshon's Elementary School.

He lived in Civil Cantonment of RAF Station in Habbaniya for 13 years, and in 1941 completed the 9th Grade at Raabi Yacoub's RAF Union School. He worked for Navy, Army & Air Force Institutes, a commercial supply company for the British military services, as a sales clerk for four years in Mosul and in Baghdad during World War II, and from 1946 to 1954 as audit clerk for the Air Ministry Audit Office in Habbaniya.

He was employed from March 1954 to December 1955 as a commercial correspondent with the Bahoshy Brothers Co. before he joined his family business, the Coronet Bookstore in Baghdad. The store had been a highly successful business in the 1950s and 1960s before Baathist government's nationalization program of imports. The bookstore had been established by his younger brother Aprim ("Appy") Pius.

Following the sale of the business, Pius ran a successful import commission office from 1974 to 1981. And after immigrating to Modesto, California in October 1981, he opened and operated a video store with his young son Yosip ("Joe"). He then sold up in 1993 and retired to pursue his love of writing.

Pius had resumed writing in 1984 and experimented with self-publishing, commencing with a newsletter called Bil Khizmaany Wdosty (Between Kith And Kin). In 1989 he began writing on the local history of Habbaniya for Nineveh Magazine.

Pius once said 'the literary bug bit him' in 1948. He became a prolific contributor on sports on the RAF base Habbaniya in the early 1950s and from Baghdad from 1954 to 1958, writing for English language newspaper The Iraq Times. He had been good friends with many of the top Assyrian football players from his days in Habbaniya such as Aram Karam, Youra Eshaya and Ammo Baba and interviewed many of the top sportsmen in football, boxing, hockey, and tennis that came from Habbaniya.

He contributed to Beirut's Arabweek and was the Baghdad sports correspondent licensed by the Iraqi Ministry of Information for The Daily Star, the Iraqi correspondent and sales representative for Gilgamesh Magazine of Tehran and the Middle East correspondent for the Assyrian Star Magazine of Gary, Indiana.

He wrote for several newspapers including Stanislaus's Today's Seniors, a monthly magazine with a circulation of 25,000 readers and produced issues of a four-page monthly newsletter St. Thomas Tidings for Mar Toma Catholic Church of Turlock from 1992 to 1993.

He was also the editor of HUSCA (Habbaniya Union School & Community Association) magazine and in 1999 published a book entitled Assyrian Tales and Confessions, a collection of ten stories and thirteen humorous essays and a second book in 2002 entitled An Assyrian's Youth Journal, of his own diary entries from May 1940 to April 1953.

He died on 9 January 2011 in Modesto, California.
