= Paulus Khofri =

Assyrian composer, lyricist and painter

- Born: 7 August 1923; Baghdad, Mandatory Iraq
- Died: May 2000 (aged 77 years); Tehran, Iran
- Known for: Musician, vocalist, composer, painter

Paulus Khofri (Syriac: ܦܘܠܘܣ ܟܦܪܝ, Persian: پولوس خفری; 7 August 1923 – May 2000) was an Assyrian composer, lyricist and painter.

== Biography ==
Khofri was born on 7 August 1923 in Baghdad, Mandatory Iraq. His father, Jibrael Khofri, and his mother Victoria, were of Assyrian descent and originally from Iran. They fled Iran during the Assyrian Genocide of World War I, migrating to Iraq, where they lived for many years. In 1928, the Khofri family returned to Iran and settled in Kermanshah in Western Iran. Khofri grew up in Kermanshah and graduated from high school there.

Khofri's father was an accordion player who inspired his son to learn the instrument. Khofri soon began to develop popular Assyrian music into a classical style; eventually, this led to the establishment of the Assyrian Music Ensemble, which performed many concerts for the Assyrian community in Kermanshah.

Khofri continued his musical studies in composition through correspondence courses from the United States and finally obtained a diploma in music composition and harmony from the United States School of Music, a correspondence school located in Port Washington, New York. Khofri conducted the Saint Joseph Catholic Church Choir in Tehran for many years and also taught piano and music on the side while working for the Iranian Oil Company until his retirement.

Khofri is credited with composing numerous Assyrian folk songs in both Assyrian Neo-Aramaic and Persian. An accomplished painter, along with these musical compositions, he often included landscapes of villages in Urmia done in black ink or water color.

In 1985, the Assyrian Foundation of America, in Berkeley, California, gave him an award in recognition of his work in Assyrian folk music.

He died in May 2000 in Tehran, Iran.

== Vocal music ==
- Book # 1 Yoomani'd Eda Soora (Christmas Days) for piano and vocal (Illustrated), 1972
- Book # 2 Zamrakh Am Ikhdadi (Sing Together) Tome 1 for piano and vocal (Illustrated), 1982
- Book #3 Sheeta'd IsreI Arba Yakhi (24 Months a Year) two songs for every month of the year with illustrations, 1982
- Book # 4 Zamrakh Mikhdadi (Sing together) Tome 2 classic folkloric song for 2, 3 and 4 voices, 1984
- Book # 5 Galli'd Zoomari Tome 3 for piano and vocals (illustrated), 1988
- Book # 6 Zmoor Blishanookh ( Sing in your Mother's Language) for young singers, 1998
- Book # 7 Songs of Praise Tome 1 for Organ and Vocals, 1988

== Instrumental Music ==
- Book # 1 Braghala'd Nemati Tome 2 No. 1 for piano, 1970
- Book # 2 Braghala'd Nemati Tome 2 No. 2 for Piano, 1980
- Book # 3 Assyrt Tome 1 classic folkloric music for piano, 1984
- Book # 4 Nemati Mbazgha Tome 1 No. 1 for piano, 1987
- Book # 5 Braghala'd Nemati Tome 2 No. 1 piano, violin, flute, guitar 1988. This book contains five parts: No. 1 Sonata in G minor for violin and cello, dedicated to Maestro William Daniel, Assyrian composer and author; No. 2 Sonata in G Major for piano, composed in Zurich, Switzerland, dedicated to Issa Benyamin, the famous Assyrian calligrapher; No. 3 Fantasia in G minor for flute and guitar, dedicated to Mr. Simon Tomik, a classical guitarist; No. 4 Suite in D minor for violin, flute, guitar and piano, titled Braghala min Toora, dedicated to the Assyrian Highlanders; No. 5 Dipna'd Aina (Near the Spring) in D Major for flute, guitar and piano, composed for young girls in the villages bringing fresh cold water, in clay jars for their fathers working in the wheat fields

== Orchestral music ==
- Book # 1 Assyrian Classic Folkloric Dance Compilation, May 1998
- Book # 2 Epic of Gilgamesh, May 1998

== Famous quotes ==
- Whatever reaches one's ears, reflects all tides of life this nation has undergone in the past, present and will experience in the future.
- Music seeks to retain firmly that spirit, either sung by men and women praising God; or hummed by the farmer tilling his field. The joy of a young man whistling expecting to meet the girl he loves. The beating of the drum and the song of the fife in religious Shara (festivals). The blaring of the Brass instruments in anger, the wailing of the Oboe in sorrow, the intimate chatter of the string instruments all tell and paint vivid images of life in waves of sound. It is hoped, therefore, one can peep through this small window of music and see the revival of our past culture in budding.

== See also ==
- Iraqi art
- Islamic art
- Islamic music
- Islamic poetry
- List of Iraqi artists
- Religious music in Iran

== See also ==
- William D. S. Daniel
- Yosip Bet Yosip
- List of Assyrians
