= Eser Afacan =

Turkish painter

- Born: 1953; Adana, Turkey
- Known for: Painter, Sculptor

Eser Afacan (born August 8, 1953) is a Turkish artist, painter, and sculptor. His father, also an artist, is Assyrian, while his mother is of Greek origin.

Afacan began drawing at a young age. He studied in Manchester, England before moving to Norway in 1978 to study Mathematics and Physics at the University of Bergen. As a student, he met Norwegian artist Odd Nerdrum, in whose Oslo studio he subsequently worked.

In 1986, Afacan had his first art display and from that date onwards has exhibited his work in many countries (Norway, Turkey, The US, Canada). His painting technique uses oil paints to create a transparent coat on the base layers, which are in tempera.

After living between England and Norway until 1985, he moved to the United States before emigrating to Canada in 2003, settling down with his family in Kingston, Ontario.
