= John J. Nimrod =

American politician

John J. Nimrod (May 1, 1922 – January 4, 2009) was an Assyrian American minority rights activist and Illinois state senator.

== Career ==
Born in Chicago to Assyrian parents who had emigrated from Iran's northwest Urmiah region, John Nimrod was for three decades a leading international figure actively working for Assyrian survival in the Middle East, cultural and educational advances in American diaspora, and the cause of minorities from Uighurs to Tibetans and Assyrians who remain officially unrepresented in world political fora. He served for many years as a leading figure in UNPO (Unrepresented Nations and Peoples Organization), the world body that presses for the rights of such people, often scattered from their homelands as a result of persecution. He began his public career working in political circles in the northern Chicago suburbs, served as committeeman and Niles Township Supervisor, and later served in the Illinois State Senate from District 4 (1973 to 1983). An early advocate of solar power, he worked to revise the Illinois mental health code as a Republican state senator. He also sponsored a bill to have the pledge of allegiance said in schools every day.

During his years in Illinois politics, he formed a network within state and city government that allowed him to later advance the work of the Assyrian Universal Alliance Foundation (AUAF), a cultural and educational organization, based in Chicago, and initially funded by Helen Nimrod James Schwarten (1910–1999), his sister. The AUAF funds scholarship programs for Chicago area Assyrian students, publication of works about Assyrians in English and Assyrian Aramaic, the language of the modern Assyrians, and sponsors other cultural activities such as the series of DVDs produced by Lina Yakubova about Assyrian communities in the locations to which they have been scattered since the genocide of World War I. Nimrod served as the key person, in his capacity as the president of the AUAF since 1999, to solicit and distribute funding for underprivileged Chicagoans from state and city welfare funds. Particularly strengthened by coming under the wing of the AUAF is Ashurbanipal Library, the only publicly accessible Assyrian library in diaspora.

A key organization to which Nimrod devoted the last twenty years of his life was the Assyrian Universal Alliance, the umbrella organization of Assyrians internationally, formed in 1968 in France. Established under the initiative of Assyrians living in the Middle East, particularly the then professionally successful Assyrians of Tehran, Iran, the AUA brought together Assyrians from many countries worldwide (as well as the USSR, but only in the period after the end of the Cold War). It also successfully bridged church divisions that have challenged the allegiance of the Assyrians. Nimrod, as president of this organization since 1991, traveled to many world capitals where he argued the Assyrian case. Together with John Yonan, another Chicago Assyrian, Nimrod helped to bring relief to Assyrians who in the 1970s suffered under the Baath party in Iraq in the years when Saddam Hussein was building his power base. Thousands of Assyrian refugees found shelter in the US due to the work of the AUA.

Political divisions in Middle Eastern capitals, especially antagonism directed at the United States due to Cold War politics and the related issue of Israel, led to a deterioration of the unity of the AUA from the 1970s onward. From the disunity that resulted, the AUA tried to salvage its role as representative of the Assyrian voice internationally as pressures on the Assyrians, the easternmost Christians in the Middle East, mounted following the establishment of the Islamic Republic of Iran (1979), and the two US led wars in Iraq (1991 following Saddam Hussein's invasion of Kuwait, and the 2003–2008 war). During Nimrod's leadership of the AUA, other rising Assyrian political parties, especially in Iraq, challenged the AUA umbrella status. The lack of effective communication among Assyrians worldwide led to the exploitation of their sectarian and diasporic divisions by Baathist spy networks and later by elements in the Kurdish political parties of Iraq. Nimrod tried to put the AUA infrastructure on a sound footing even as the diaspora community increased and immigrant individuals, families and tribes challenged the authority of organizations and individuals whose western worldview and political experience differed from theirs. He experienced difficulty in surmounting the divisions.

Nonetheless he remained an ardent supporter of Assyrian causes and formed many deep and effective relationships with the leadership of the Church of the East, members of the Chaldean church, and others within the Syriac-based Christian communities that form the basis of the Assyrian community worldwide. His good relations with Iranian political figures like former President Khatami led to a successful convening of an AUA Congress in Tehran attended by Iranian dignitaries.

== Personal life ==
John Nimrod was born to Joseph Nimrod and Anna Kochaly Nimrod, a family from Spurghan, a large satellite village in Iran's West Azarbaijan province. The father immigrated to the United States for temporary work, as had many other Assyrians from this area, prior to World War I, leaving behind a large extended family, including two daughters and one son. (Schwarten, p. 2) The family survived the ethnic cleansing of Assyrians and Armenians in the Urmiah region, survived an arduous trek on foot from Iran to the refugee camp in Baquba, Iraq, and finally, thanks to the relief organizations that allowed the father to reach his family with money, the family made its way to New York, then to Chicago by train. Two children, John and a sister named Julia, were born in Chicago. The family lived in the Lincoln Park section of the city where many Assyrian families had settled. After high school graduation (1940), Nimrod started at Northwestern University but his education was interrupted by service in the U.S. Army (Europe) but returned to graduate in 1950 with a degree in mechanical engineering. Later he served in the Korean War and was discharged with the rank of captain. He worked for Fisher Body and later started a fiberglass plant in Chicago that built molds for swimming pools. He married Dorothy (Ingrid) Paul, and during the 1960s they adopted four children, John, Joseph, Lizabeth and Naomi.

Nimrod spoke the Neo-Aramaic language well, a skill he polished in Chicago as he became increasingly active in Assyrian affairs.
