= William D. S. Daniel =

Assyrian author, poet and musician

- ویلیام دی اس دانیل
- Born: March 17, 1903; Urumia, Iran
- Died: 1988 (aged 84–85); San Jose, California
- Occupations: Poet, writer and musician

William D. S. Daniel, (Assyrian Neo-Aramaic: ܘܠܝܡ ܕܢܝܐܝܠ; March 17, 1903 – 1988) was an Assyrian writer, poet and musician. He was born in Urmia, Iran, and emigrated to the United States in the 1950s. He played a pivotal role in preserving and enriching Assyrian cultural heritage.

== Education ==
William Daniel began his education in missionary schools, where he was immersed in the study of the Assyrian Neo-Aramaic (often simply, "Assyrian") language. After the First World War, he went to Hamadan, where he commenced his formal musical education. Subsequently, he pursued advanced studies in the conservatory of music in Basel, Switzerland, honing his skills as an accomplished violinist. His time in Europe also saw him translating Cyrano de Bergerac from the original French into Assyrian.

== Career ==
=== Music ===
In 1937, Daniel returned to Iran, eventually settling in Tehran. There, he shifted his focus to composing original Assyrian music. The year 1943 marked a significant milestone when he wrote songs for the weekly Assyrian program broadcast on national radio. Additionally, Daniel organized choirs, plays, concerts, and taught classes in the Assyrian language and literature, fostering cultural growth.

In the United States, where he had resettled in 1952, Daniel received the 1970 Beblis award for his musical piece, "Juvenile Suite".

=== Literature ===
Daniel realized a lifelong ambition by creating his retelling of the Assyrian epic of Kateeny the Great in verse. The first volume of this epic, along with his Assyrian book of verse for children titled Rameena the Naughty, was published in 1961 by the Assyrian Youth and Cultural Society of Tehran. Simultaneously, his first book of songs, The Rays of Light was released.

During his Chicago years (1952–1979), he published the second volume of Kateeny the Great; his music collection titled William Daniel's Creations; Assyrians of Today, Their Problems and a Solution; and the bilingual play Kismat.

=== Contributions to Assyrian culture ===
In 1952, Daniel immigrated to the United States, settling in Chicago. He continued teaching the Assyrian language, composing music, organizing cultural events, and contributing articles to Assyrian magazines. His editorial role at Mhadyana in the 1960s attested to his commitment to Assyrian literature.

== San Jose years and posthumous recognition ==
Daniel relocated from Chicago to San Jose, California in 1979, where he continued to contribute to Assyrian culture. Serving as editor of the Assyrian Star magazine, he penned numerous articles, poems, and musical pieces. In 1983, he immortalized Kateeny the Great by publishing the third and final volume, comprising over 7,000 verses. He died in San Jose in 1988. His students posthumously honored him in 1992 by publishing his previously unpublished poems in Assyrian and English in an illustrated book titled Tapestry. He is buried in San Jose.

== Works ==
- Cyrano de Bergerac (translation)
- Kateeny the Great (from the Assyrian epic)
- Rameena the Naughty (children's stories)
- The Rays of Light (song book)
- William Daniel's Creations (music collection)
- Assyrians of Today, Their Problems and a Solution (non-fiction)

== See also ==
- Paulus Khofri
- Yosip Bet Yosip
