= Issa Benyamin =

Issa Benyamin (May 15, 1924 – January 14, 2014) was an Iranian-Assyrian calligrapher and educator.

== Biography ==
Assyrian calligrapher, Issa Benyamin was born to Assyrian parents, Mirza Benyamin Kaldani (1879-1966) and Esther in 1924 in Tabriz, Iran and shortly thereafter, settled in Urmia, once a heavily Assyrian populated region in northwestern Iran that was the site of the Assyrian genocide of 1914–1918.

Benyamin's love for the Neo-Aramaic language developed early on when his father, who was originally from Salamas, Iran, taught him to read and write Neo-Aramaic. By the time Benyamin was seventeen, he fell in love with the art of calligraphy and began mastering it under the tutelage of Bishop Havil Zaya, the Archbishop of Urmia and Salamas.

Benyamin's many publications included the weekly Assyrian-Persian Datid barana'Bright Future in 1951 and in 1962, one of the first books on the principles of Assyrian writing. From 1981 to 1983, he was the Assyrian editor of the weekly Ishtar (name of ancient Assyrian female deity) .'

Beginning in 1975, Benyamin devoted much of his time to paintings and illustrations using Assyrian calligraphy creating hundreds of pieces that will soon be published in a three-volume collection. He was credited with the development of fifty-two Assyrian fonts that can be used in a variety of word processors and similar programs.

In 1993, two of Benyamin's works were featured in The Voice of Ink, a French magazine.

His daughter, Ramica and his son, Ramsin, founded Benyamin's company, CalligRam, in 1997. He made his home in Normal, Illinois. and was married to Clara Manasserians, originally of Golpshan, a large village east of Urmiah. Issa Benyamin died on January 20, 2014.

== Awards ==
- Excellence Award presented by the Assyrian Academic Society of Chicago in 1991
- Excellence Award presented by Ashurbanipal Library in Chicago in 1991
- Hammurabi Award presented by The Assyrian Heritage Organization of Chicago in 1992
- Ashurbanipal Award presented by Assyrian American National Federation in 1994
- The Mesopotamian Arts Award (Raab-Amne) from the Assyrian Aid Society in 2009

== See also ==
- List of Assyrian-Iranians
