= Assyrian Universal Alliance =

Assyrian Universal Alliance ܚܘܝܕܐ ܬܒ̣ܝܠܝܐ ܐܬܘܪܝܐ
- General Secretary: Carlo K. Ganjeh
- Founded: April 13, 1968
- Headquarters: Campbell, CA USA
- Ideology: Assyrian nationalism Minority rights
- International affiliation: UNPO

Website
- Official website

Assyrian Universal Alliance (Syriac: ܚܘܝܕܐ ܬܒ̣ܝܠܝܐ ܐܬܘܪܝܐ, Arabic: الاتحاد الآشوري العالمي; Persian: اتحادیه جهانی آشوریان), usually abbreviated as AUA and popularly known as Khoyada (English: Unity) is an ethnic Assyrian worldwide umbrella organization made up of different sectors of the Assyrian federations and organizations throughout the world.

== History ==
On the 13th of April 1968, the Assyrian Universal Alliance was founded in Pau, France where the first congress was held. The AUA as a global organisation seeks to spread, uphold and enhance the Assyrian name in the world, to secure the human rights of the Assyrian people in their homeland and to attain an autonomous state in the Assyrian homeland.

The AUA has held 28 world congresses in which representatives of the Assyrian federations, organizations and political parties have participated, voicing the concerns of their respective communities and partaking in directing the affairs of the nation. Each AUA World Congress has convened in a different country to strengthen the relation between the AUA, the Assyrians and the government of that host country. The AUA World Congress has been held in the US, Europe, Australia, Iran and Iraq. The AUA had not been able to hold its World Congress in Iraq, the Assyrian homeland, until 2010 in Erbil as the aspirations of the Assyrian people were in direct conflict with the policies of the ruling Baath regime, which continuously denied Assyrians their national identity and status as the indigenous people of Iraq and persisted in its attempts to Arabize them.

The current Secretary-General of the AUA is Carlo K Ganjeh. The current affiliates of the AUA include: the Assyrian National Congress of Georgia, Assyrian National Council of Iran, Assyrian Association of Armenia, Assyrian Australian National Federation and the Assyrian Federation of Russia.

After the inception of the AUA, a serious effort was undertaken to address the need of the Assyrian nation to have its own official flag. The worldwide effort netted a large number of designs which were presented in front of the AUA congress and a final design was approved at the 6th AUA congress in Yonkers, New York which was designed by Mr. George Bit-Atanus.

== Ideology ==
The AUA does not see itself as a political party, rather as a collective that functions with political parties and leans towards appropriate institutions. The founding document of the AUA declares "Assyrian" as the "singular name for all members of our nation [umtan]" and lists the various churches of Syriac heritage.

The AUA's founding principles are centred around: "One name for one nation, One language for one nation, One leadership for one nation, A homeland for one nation.”

== UNPO ==
On the 6th of August 1991, the Assyrian Universal Alliance became a member of the Unrepresented Nations and Peoples Organization, representing Assyria.

The AUA has continuously pushed for Assyrian rights during UNPO gatherings such as the General Assembly held in Taiwan, where the AUA presented the critical conditions of Assyrians living in Iraq and introduced a resolution that called the UNPO General Assembly to support an autonomous status (self-administered region) for Assyrians in Iraq.

In August 1996, AUA delivered a statement to the UN sub-commission, voicing concerns over the discrimination against Assyrians in Northern Iraq as well as being deprived of preserving their identity. Thus, the AUA called for a civil administration to be put in place in Northern Iraq in order to provide the necessary services. In September 1996, an Assyrian delegation and the UNPO met with the assistant to the UN Special Rapporteur on Iraq to brief him on the situation of Assyrians.

John J. Nimrod, former secretary-general of the AUA, served as chairman of the UNPO General Assembly from 1992 to 2004.

== Assyrian Universal Alliance Foundation ==
The Assyrian Universal Alliance Foundation (AUAF), a non-profit organization, was established in Chicago in 1978 as a response to the mass migration of Assyrian refugees to the United States, with the intent to assist with the resettlement process.

AUAF has since expanded its mission beyond social services to include humanitarian relief efforts, as well as educational and cultural programs. AUAF has developed multiple community programs such as a Fine Arts Program that identifies talented Assyrian Americans and engage their talents to become effective leaders, tutoring services for Assyrians in secondary school, scholarships, and the Ashurbanipal Library which was founded in the 1980s and is home to the largest and most extensive collection of Assyrian texts in the world.

== See also ==
- Assyrian nationalism
- Assyrian homeland
