= Benjamin Arsanis =

Assyrian nationalist, historian and author (1884–1957)

- ܒܢܝܐܡܝܢ ܐܪܣܐܢܝܣ
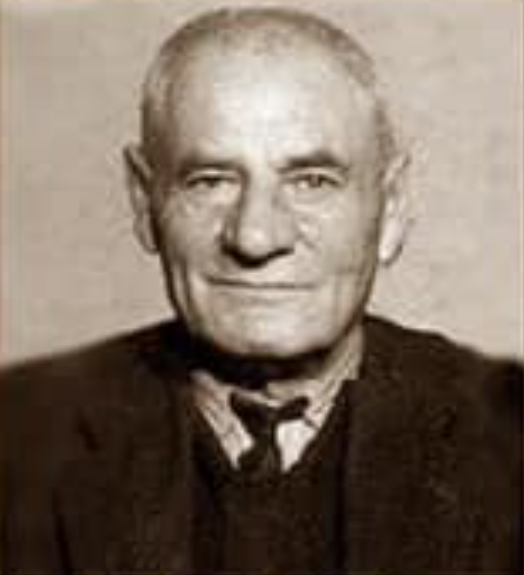
- Portrait photograph (1940s/50s)
- Born: 1884; Digala, Urmia, Qajar Iran
- Died: 1957 (aged 72–73)
- Political party: Assyrian Socialist Party
- Children: Guiwarguis; Marouna

Benjamin Arsanis (Note: Alternate transliterations include: Benyamin Arsanis, Binyamin Arsanis and Binjamin Arsanis.) (Syriac: ܒܢܝܐܡܝܢ ܐܪܣܐܢܝܣ; 1884–1957) was an Assyrian politician, writer, teacher and historian. Arsanis was, together with Freydun Atturaya and Baba Parhad, one of the co-founders of the Assyrian Socialist Party, and he served as the head of the party's central committee. Arsanis was also a prominent member, and in cases founder, of other Assyrian organizations, such as the Society of Assyrian Literary Culture which in the 1910s sought to increase enthusiasm for the Assyrian language and culture.

Arsanis published several important works on language and history, and is widely recognized as a patriot for the Assyrian people.

== Biography ==
Arsanis was born in 1884 in the village of Digala in Urmia, Iran. Arsanis studied at a newly established Orthodox school in Urmia from 1898 to 1910. After completing his studies there, he travelled to Russia, where he studied history at the Lazarev Institute of Oriental Languages. He later returned to Urmia and taught at his old school until it closed in 1918.

On 10 May 1912, Arsanis founded the Society of Assyrian Literary Culture, with the purpose to "increase enthusiasm for the nation and to expand authorship in the spoken language". The society, with Arsanis as director, met weekly for discussion meetings. Per the society's 1912 bylaws, both men and women could join and members were free to leave whenever they wished to. Arsanis strongly supported efforts to develop printing houses for Assyrian literature.

Inspired by the February Revolution in Russia, Arsanis in early 1917, together with the other Assyrian activists Freydun Atturaya and Baba Parhad, founded the Assyrian Socialist Party in Urmia, which was the first ever Assyrian political party and prominently advocated for the creation of an independent Assyrian state in the Assyrian homeland, closely allied to the nascent Soviet Union. Originally operating under the full name Assyrian Socialist Party of the Transcaucasus, the Assyrian Socialist Party is today seen as the first step towards the many later Assyrian political organizations. Arsanis was chosen to be the head of the party's central committee. Later in 1917, the party established cells in various villages in Urmia and Salmas, as well as throughout the Transcaucasus (including Tbilisi and Yerevan) and reached more than two hundred full members.

Members of various Assyrian organizations were repressed in the early Soviet Union on account of their nationalist organizing. Some were arrested, some were sent to labor camps and some, such as Atturaya, were killed. Despite this, Arsanis continued to be involved in various Assyrian movements, at times within Soviet borders. Between 1925 and 1938, Arsanis and David Ilyan were the chief editors of the Assyrian magazine Kukva d'Madinkha, published in Tbilisi.

From 1952 to 1970, there was an increased Assyrian cultural output in Iran. The Iranian Assyrian community had two private schools (Behnam and Chouchon), its own magazine (Gilgamesh) and the newly founded Assyrian Youth Cultural Society. Arsanis, alongside other authors such as Nemrod Simono, Kourosh Benyamin, Pira Sarmas and William Sarmas, was an important figure in this movement and published several important works in the modern Assyrian language. Arsanis died in 1957.

== Legacy ==
Arsanis is remembered by modern Assyrians as a respected patriot, orator and writer. An esteemed writer, particularly on language and history, many of Arsanis's works have been lost, though several also survive. In 2008, twelve of his books; Teaching Assyrian Language (two volumes), Assyrian Proverbs, The Fall of the Assyrian Empire, Assyrian Monument in China, Prophet Mohammed's Documents, Assyrian Accomplishments in Asia, The Tragedy of 2,000 Assyrian Maidens, Rescue of Iran, Assyrian History Relative to Kurds, Book of Riddles and A Short Story, were collected, edited and annotated in a single volume by author Youel A. Baaba.

During the visit of Mar Dinkha IV, the Patriarch of the Assyrian Church of the East, to Russia in June–July 1982, the patriarch met with Guiwarguis and Marouna Arsanis, sons of Benjamin Arsanis, to discuss possible measures to be taken for the construction of an Assyrian church in Moscow.
