= Assyrian Socialist Party =

- Founders: Freydun Atturaya; Benjamin Arsanis; Baba Parhad
- Founded: 1917 (original party); 2002 (re-establishment)
- Headquarters: Baghdad, Iraq
- Ideology: Socialism; Assyrian nationalism Secularism
- Political position: Left-wing
- Colours: Red & Yellow
- Seats in the Council of Representatives of Iraq: 0 / 325

The Assyrian Socialist Party (Syriac: Gaba Shawtapaya Atouraya), (Note: Alternatively transliterated as Gabu Shautapaya Aturaya.) abbreviated as ASP or GSA, is an Assyrian political party primarily active in Iraq. Its original incarnation, founded by Freydun Atturaya, Benjamin Arsanis and Baba Parhad in February 1917, was the first Assyrian political party and possibly the first Assyrian national organization. The Assyrian Socialist Party advocated for socialism and secularism, though it was chiefly concerned with the idea of creating an independent Assyrian state in the Assyrian homeland.

The party, based on the same ideals as its first incarnation, was re-established by a group of Assyrian activists in 2002 and is presently headquartered in Baghdad. Branches of the Assyrian Socialist Party also exist in Syria, Iran, Turkey and Lebanon.

== History ==
=== Original party ===
The Assyrian Socialist Party was founded in Urmia, Iran in February 1917, inspired by the revolutionary sentiments in Russia which soon thereafter led to the Russian Revolution. Originally founded under the full name Assyrian Socialist Party of the Transcaucasus, the party's principal founder was the physician and actor Freydun Atturaya, who had previously headed a theatrical troupe that acted in the Marjanishvili Theatre in Tbilisi, Georgia. In terms of Assyrian affairs, Atturaya had already made a name for himself as the organizer of the "Assyrian National Committee of Urmia" during World War I, which sent local Christians to study in Russia. Alongside Atturaya, the party's co-founders were Benjamin Arsanis and Dr. Baba Parhad. Arsanis, a graduate of the Lazarev Institute of Oriental Languages, was the first head of the party's central committee. The Assyrian Socialist Party was the first Assyrian political party and possibly the first Assyrian national organization. It has been described by later researchers as the decisive first step toward the numerous later Assyrian political organizations. In its founding year, the Assyrian Socialist Party established cells in Urmia, Tbilisi, Yerevan and Salmas and reached over two hundred full party members.

During World War I and the Sayfo, or Assyrian genocide, the Assyrian community in Tbilisi, including members of the Socialist Party and aided by the local government, organized a committee to aid Assyrian refugees. In April 1917, in response to the genocide, Atturaya issued a Marxist-inspired declaration in Aramaic, the Urmia Manifesto of the United Free Assyria, which called for the establishment of an independent Assyrian state, to "guarantee peace and freedom for all Assyrians in their ancestral land", hopefully with economic and military relations with the Russia. Owing to Atturaya's writings advocating for the separation of separation of church and state, the Patriarch of the Assyrian Church of the East, Shimun XIX Benyamin, condemned the Assyrian Socialist Party as "anarchist".

The Assyrian Socialist Party hoped to establish close relations with the nascent Soviet Union, which they believed could aid the Assyrians in returning to their homeland. The news of the victory of the Russian Revolution in 1917 had been celebrated by the party, which held a support meeting attended by many thousands, where Atturaya, Arsanis and others held speeches. However, the party's Assyrian nationalism did not align well with the politics of the Soviets and some of the Assyrian Socialist Party's policies directly opposed what the Soviets viewed as the principles of communism. As a result of Soviet opposition, various prominent members of Assyrian organizations within Soviet territory were repressed in the 1920s and 1930s. Some were arrested, some were sent to labor camps and a handful were killed. Atturaya was arrested by the authorities of the Soviet Union in 1924 for his nationalist organizing and, supposedly, suspicions of being a "British spy" and was killed in 1926. After his death, he became a romantic figure, viewed by many Assyrians as a national hero and martyr.

=== Re-establishment ===
The party was re-established by a group of Assyrian activists in northern Iraq in 2002. The present party is headquartered in Baghdad and is the only left-wing Assyrian political party in Iraq. The new party advocates the same ideals as its predecessor, including prominently supporting Assyrian independence. Though it holds no seats in the government, the party has since December 2003 been recognized as among the country's minor Assyrian political parties. Other than the main branch in Iraq, sometimes referred to as Bet Nahrain, (Note: Beth Nahrain is a common name in the Syriac language for Mesopotamia and literally means "between (two) rivers". It should in this context not be confused with the Bet-Nahrain Democratic Party, a centre-right Assyrian political party in Iraq.) branches of the Assyrian Socialist Party also exist in other countries with Assyrian populations, including Iran, Lebanon, Syria and Turkey.
