= Freydun Atturaya =

Assyrian nationalist, doctor and poet (1891–1926)

- ܦ̮ܪܝܕܘܢ ܐܬܘܪܝܐ
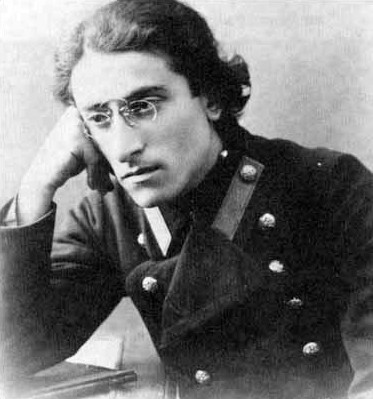
- Portrait photograph
- Born: Freydun Bet-Abram; 1891; Charbash, Urmia, Qajar Persia
- Died: 2 October 1926 (aged 35); Tbilisi, Georgian SSR
- Cause of death: Execution by shooting
- Political party: Assyrian Socialist Party
- Spouse: Sonia
- Children: Sargon; Nelli
- Parent(s): Yacob Bet-Abram; Insoph Taimoorazy

Freydun Bet-Abram (Note: Alternate transliterations include: Freydun Bit Abram, Freydun Abraham, Freydun Beth-Avraham, Freydun Beth Abraham, Fraidon Bet-Avraham and Freydun Beat-Abramov. In Russia he was known as Freydun Yakovlevich.) (Syriac: ܦ̮ܪܝܕܘܢ ܒܝܬ ܐܒܪܡ; 1891 – 2 October 1926), better known as Freydun Atturaya (Note: Literally meaning "Freydun the Assyrian". Alternate transliterations include: Freydun Aturaya, Freidun Aturaya, Freydun Atoraya, Freydun Aturāyā and Fraidon Aturaya.) (Syriac: ܦ̮ܪܝܕܘܢ ܐܬܘܪܝܐ), was an Assyrian national leader, politician, doctor and poet. Atturaya was one of the founders of the first Assyrian political party, the Assyrian Socialist Party, and a prominent early advocate for Assyrian independence. He is remembered by Assyrians today as a romantic figure, considered by some to be a national hero and martyr.

Born in the village of Charbash in Urmia, Persia, Atturaya grew up in Tbilisi in Georgia. He studied medicine at a Russian missionary school in Harpoot, graduating in 1915, and perhaps then went on to study in Russia itself. During World War I, he was recruited as a medical doctor into the Imperial Russian Army and he held various positions and offices, both medical and political, before returning to Urmia in 1916 as a political officer and the head of an army hospital. In Urmia, Atturaya organized the Assyrian National Committee of Urmia, which sent young Assyrians to study in Russia. Inspired by the February Revolution in Russia, Atturaya early in 1917, together with the other Assyrian activists Benjamin Arsanis and Baba Parhad founded the Assyrian Socialist Party, which prominently advocated for the creation of an independent Assyrian state in the Assyrian homeland, closely allied to the nascent Soviet Union. In April 1917 he published the Urmia Manifesto of the United Free Assyria.

Atturaya also partook in other Assyrian cultural efforts. He published articles in the prominent Assyrian magazine Kokhva ("Star") and for a time published his own Assyrian magazine, Nakusha. He also founded Assyrian libraries in both Tbilisi and Moscow and as a poet wrote numerous poems dedicated to the Assyrian cause and Assyrian culture. On Atturaya's initiative, the Assyrians of Tbilisi organized the National Council of Transcaucasia, an organization founded to help Assyrian refugees during the Sayfo (Assyrian genocide). He was also a prominent member of other Assyrian organizations; in 1921 he was elected as the chairman of the Assyrian People's Council, the executive committee of the Assyrian National Council of Georgia. Though Atturaya tried to align his efforts with the policies of the Soviet Union, the Soviets opposed his movements on account of his Assyrian nationalism and some of his other policies being opposed to what they viewed as the principles of communism. He was arrested twice by the Soviet authorities, first in 1924 and then in 1926. After his second arrest he was executed by shooting.

== Background and early life ==
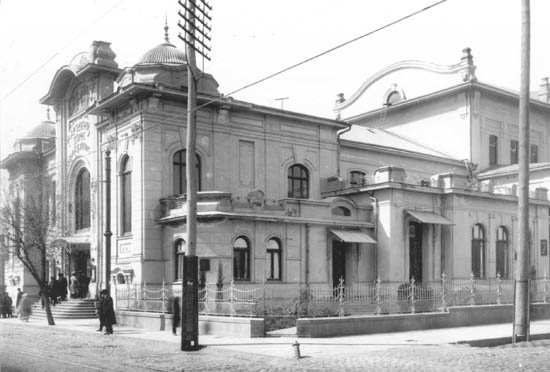
Early 20th-century photograph of the Marjanishvili Theatre in Tbilisi, where Atturaya in the 1910s headed a theatrical troupe

Freydun Bet-Abram was born in 1891 in the village of Charbash in Urmia, Persia. He was the son of Yacob Bet-Abram and Insoph Taimoorazy. The name Atturaya was assumed later on during his activism and literally means "the Assyrian". In 1902, Atturaya and his family moved to Georgia and he grew up in Tbilisi. Georgia was at the beginning of the 20th century one of the unofficial centers of the Assyrian elite; owing to the concentration of Assyrian refugees, vacancies for employment in the local competitive labor market and other factors, there was substantial Assyrian settlement in the country.

In the early 1910s, Atturaya headed a theatrical troupe that acted in the Marjanishvili Theatre in Tbilisi. The troupe, dubbed the "Dramatic Society of Assyrians in Tbilisi", often performed plays rooted in Assyrian culture and history. In 1911, they performed the play Grief, written by Atturaya, and in 1914 they performed the play Shamiram, which included characters such as Sargon, Sennacherib, Nimrod and Ninus. All the proceeds from this performance went to the publication of the Assyrian Kokhva ("Star") magazine.

Atturaya studied medicine at a Russian missionary school in Harpoot, a prominent center of Armenian nationalism. He graduated as a doctor in 1915, the same year as the city's population was violently massacred by the Ottoman Empire during the Armenian genocide. In Harpoot, Atturaya would have met Ashur Yousif, another prominent Assyrian activist, killed by the Ottomans in 1915. Atturaya might also have studied in Russia, perhaps attending the military academy at the Leningrad University. After graduating, Atturaya was appointed as a medical doctor in the Imperial Russian Army. Atturaya was promoted to the head of a military hospital in Georgia during World War I and eventually attained the position of "Chief Medical Officer for the Northern and Southern Caucasian Railways".

== Activism ==
=== Early activities ===
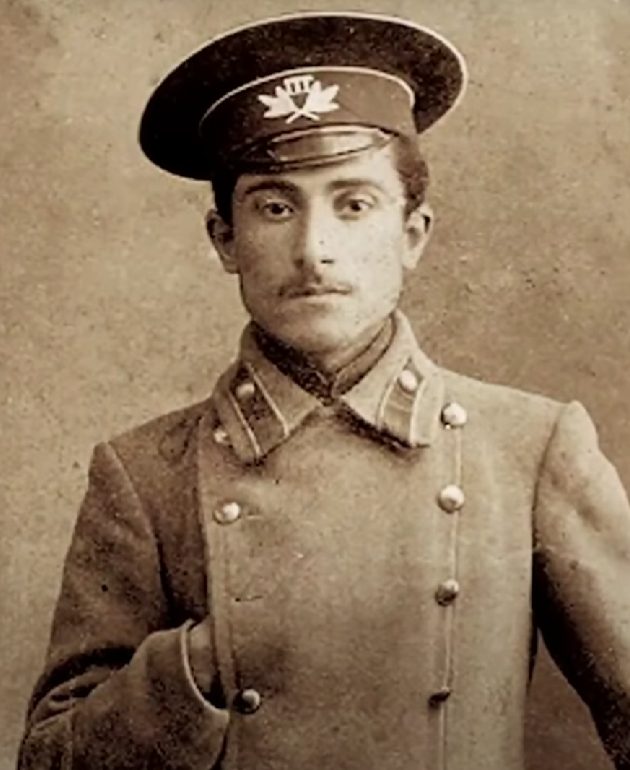
Portrait photograph of Atturaya in the Russian army

Urmia became a prominent center for early Assyrian nationalism. Owing to ceaseless massacres, harassment and discrimination under the Ottoman Empire, the Assyrian elite in Urmia became convinced that there was nobody else protecting them and they had to organize themselves and fight for their freedom and autonomy on their own, seeking a "rebirth of the nation". The "mouthpiece" of this movement was the Kokhva magazine, published in Urmia from 1906 to 1918 as the only independent Assyrian publication, without any foreign Christian support. Kokhva prominently supported unity among the Assyrians, despite denominational differences. Also in 1906, the Assyrians of Urmia succeeded in creating the Assyrian National Council, consisting of nine people and aiming to send representatives to the Iranian parliament. This organization was however dissolved after less than a year due to rivalry between the different Christian denominations. A second iteration of the National Council was thereafter founded in Tbilisi, where it continued to function for some time.

Atturaya was early on an activist for Assyrian nationalism and independence. On 24 April 1911, at just twenty years old, Atturaya wrote an article in Kokhva titled "Who are the Assyrians? How is Our Nation to Be Raised Up?" (Note: The predominant identity among modern Assyrians in their own language is suryāyā, suryāyē or sūrōyē, sometimes translated as "Syrian". It is not technically a different identity from "Assyrian" since the term derives from the ancient assūrāyu ("Assyrian"), which was sometimes even in ancient times rendered in the shorter form sūrāyu. The translated English title of the article here uses "Syrian" since Atturaya prominently pointed this etymological connection out in the article.) in which he stressed the ancient descent of the modern Assyrians and proclaimed them to be the "children of Ashur or Ator, the second son of Shem". Throughout the following years, he continued to closely collaborate with Kokhva in promoting Assyrian nationalism.

During the war, Atturaya returned to Urmia as a part of a contingent of Russian soldiers. He served there as a political officer and a medical professional at the 492nd Army Hospital in Khoy. In 1916, he was one of two representatives, alongside a bishop, sent by the Assyrians of Khoy to be interviewed by the Russians concerning the organization of refugees of the Caucasian front of World War I. In Urmia, Atturaya also organized the Assyrian National Committee of Urmia, which provided local Christians with the opportunity to study in Russia. In total, about 250 young Assyrians studied in Russia with the help of this programme.

Atturaya presented himself as a serious thinker and a revolutionary. Unlike the then stereotypical image of Assyrians as mountain tribesmen, Atturaya's photographs showed him as a slender man with round wire-frame glasses, sometimes posing with his fist on his temple, the stereotypical pose of a "thinker".

=== Assyrian Socialist Party ===
Flag of the Assyrian Socialist Party

Inspired by the February Revolution in Russia, Atturaya early in 1917, together with the other Assyrian activists Benjamin Arsanis and Baba Parhad, founded the Assyrian Socialist Party. The Assyrian Socialist Party, founded in Urmia, was the first ever Assyrian political party and prominently advocated for the creation of an independent Assyrian state in the Assyrian homeland, closely allied to the nascent Soviet Union. Originally operating under the full name Assyrian Socialist Party of the Transcaucasus, the Assyrian Socialist Party is today seen as the first step towards the many later Assyrian political organizations. Although Arsanis headed the party's central committee, Atturaya was so pivotal to the party's foundation that some historians list only Atturaya as founder. Later in 1917, the party established cells in various villages in Urmia and Salmas, as well as throughout the Transcaucasus (including Tbilisi and Yerevan) and reached more than two hundred full members.

In April 1917, having heard of the ongoing Sayfo (Assyrian genocide) in the Ottoman Empire, Atturaya published the Marxist-inspired Urmia Manifesto of the United Free Assyria. The Urmia manifesto, written in Aramaic, set out various goals of the Assyrian people, most prominently gaining peace, freedom and autonomy in their ancestral homeland. The manifesto called for the creation of an Assyrian state which included Urmia, Mosul, Nisibin, Tur Abdin, Jazira and Jularmeg and which was to be economically, militarily and industrially tied to Russia. The Urmia Manifesto was notably secular in its content, advocating for Assyria led by intellectual and political leaders rather than the clergy. As this threatened the spiritual leadership of the Assyrian Church of the East over the people, both the manifesto and the Assyrian Socialist Party were condemned by Patriarch Shimun XIX Benyamin.

The intent of the Assyrian Socialist Party was to establish cells within Russia, that together with the Soviet Union could eventually facilitate the return of the Assyrians to their homeland. Upon the victory of the Russian Revolution in late 1918, the Assyrian National Council met the news with holding a meeting attended by many thousands, at which (among others) both Atturaya and Arsanis held speeches. The Soviets were despite this opposed to the Assyrian movement on the grounds of its nationalism, which among other policies of the Assyrian Socialist Party was viewed as opposed to the principles of communism.

=== Other organizations and efforts ===
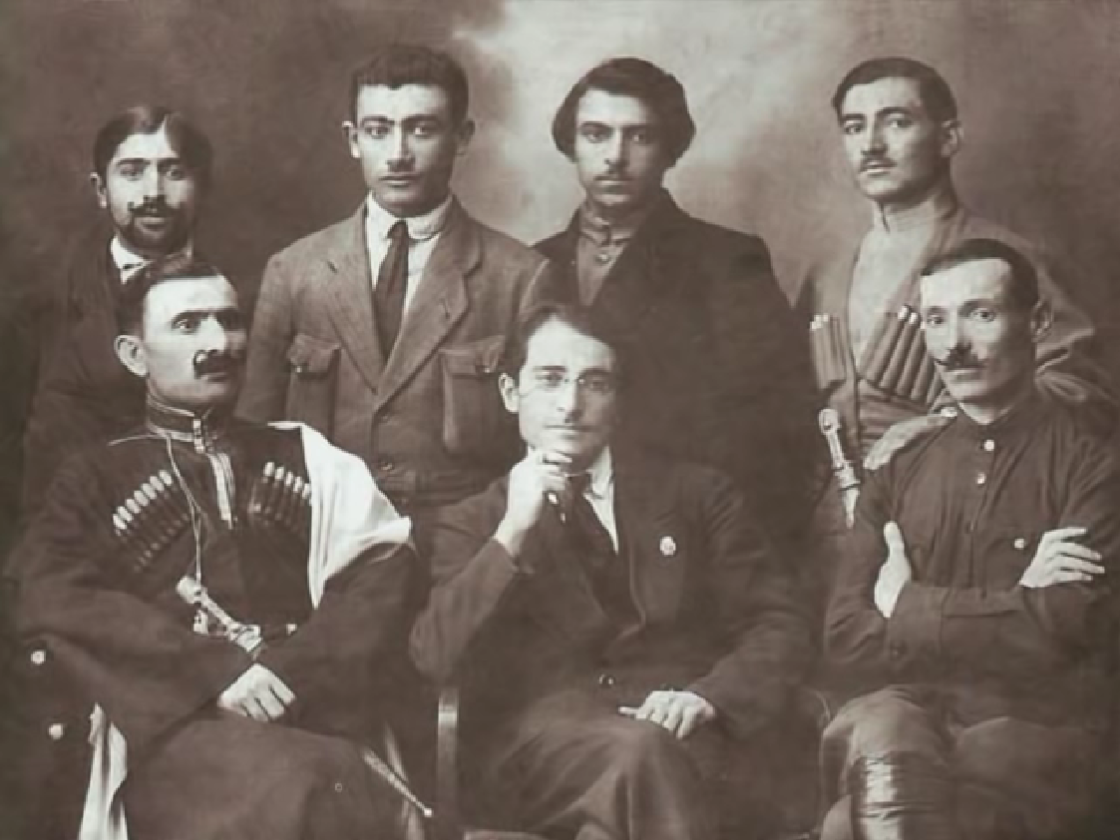
Atturaya (bottom center) photographed with some of his associates c. 1915–1917

During the Sayfo, the Assyrians of Tbilisi, aided by members of the local government, organized a committee to help Assyrian refugees from Turkey and Iran. This committee, dubbed the National Council of Transcaucasia, was Atturaya's initiative. During the voting for leadership of the council on 3 January 1918, Atturaya was without much opposition elected chairman. Atturaya personally met around 7,000 Assyrian refugees in Tbilisi. The council swiftly began to also invest itself into military matters, overstepping its original mission and purpose. Atturaya kept up to date with developments on the Caucasian front of the war and corresponded with allied military officials concerning the equipment of Assyrian units in their armies, such as the British Assyrian volunteers. The council initially viewed the creation of such units as a possible step towards the army of a future independent Assyrian state. Owing to internal disagreements, the National Council of Transcaucasia collapsed during the spring of 1918 and by May, only three active members remained. At the council's final meeting on May 22, it was agreed to dissolve the organization.

Though internal disagreements led to the rise of various other Assyrian organizations, the most major Assyrian organization in Georgia, the remaining Assyrian National Council, reorganized itself formally as the Assyrian National Council of Georgia (ASSNARS) in 1921. In a meeting on 11 March 1921, the executive committee of this new body, dubbed the Assyrian People's Council, were elected; Atturaya was elected as chairman. Also in 1921, Atturaya visited Georgy Chicherin, the Soviet People's Commissar for Foreign Affairs, to advocate for resettling Assyrian refugees in Urmia and elsewhere in Iran, but the meeting had little effect.

=== Arrests and death ===
To combat nationalism within the Soviet Union, the Soviet authorities used political repression. Over the course of the 1920s, the majority of the members of the Assyrian cultural and political elite within the Soviet Union were persecuted with varying consequences and degrees of intensity. Many were arrested, some were sent to forced labor camps and a handful were killed. In 1924, Atturaya was arrested by the Soviet authorities as a "British spy" and Assyrian nationalist. Though he was eventually released, he was arrested again on 12 July 1926.

Atturaya's case was transferred to the People's Commissariat of Justice of the Georgian Soviet Socialist Republic for a public hearing, which worked little in his favor. On 30 August, Atturaya sent a letter to the Supreme Court of the Soviet Union with the title "my spy case, devised by my personal enemies". He was killed on 2 October 1926. Though the Soviets denied involvement in his death and claimed that he had hanged himself and some later historians have stated that he was poisoned in prison, Soviet documentation records that he was executed by shooting.

== Personal life ==
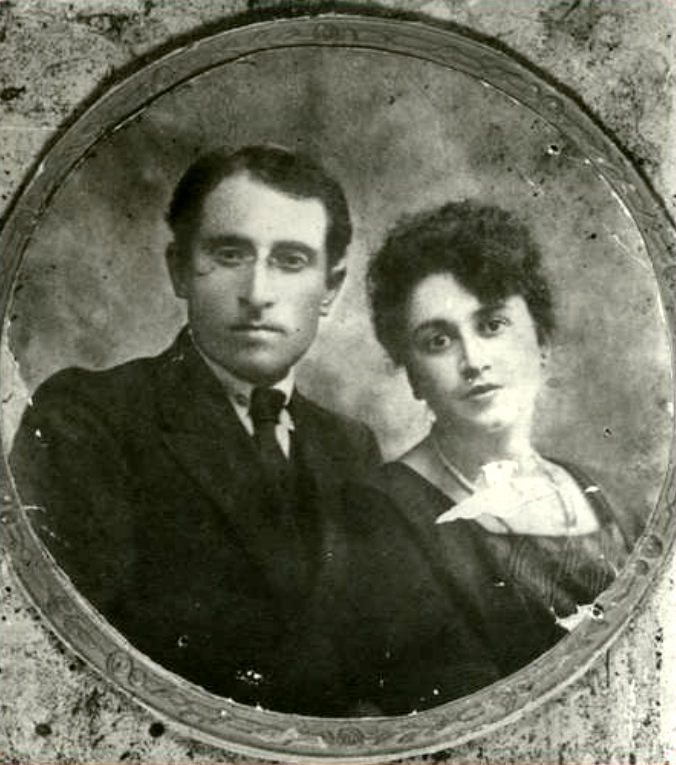
Atturaya with his wife Sonia

In 1922, Atturaya married his wife Sonia, with whom he had two children: the son Sargon (born in 1923) and the daughter Nelli (born in 1926). Atturaya's son was one of the first contemporary Assyrians to be given the ancient name Sargon, (Note: Sargon was the name of three ancient Mesopotamian kings: Sargon of the Akkadian Empire and the two Assyrian kings Sargon I and Sargon II.) today a common name among Assyrians. Sonia was pregnant with Nelli at the time of Atturaya's last arrest and he never saw his daughter.

== Legacy ==
Atturaya remains recognized as an important early Assyrian national leader and is remembered as a romantic figure, seen by some Assyrians as a national hero and martyr. Among Atturaya's other cultural efforts beyond his participation in Assyrian political organizations was the publication of his own Assyrian nationalist magazine, Nakusha, and the establishment of Assyrian libraries in both Tbilisi and Moscow.

Atturaya was a talented romantic poet, dedicating numerous poems to the Assyrian cause. Though only a small number of his writings have survived owing to the destruction of both the archives of the Assyrian Socialist Party and his own personal archive, some of his surviving poems have been turned into popular songs. One of his poems, "Oh Eagle of Tkhuma" (Ya Nishra Di Tkhumi), has become almost akin to a national anthem for many Assyrians. "Oh Eagle of Tkhuma" describes the flight of an eagle over the lands of ancient Assyria, focusing first on the mountains and then on the "bold and warlike men" who live there.
