= Urmia Manifesto of the United Free Assyria =

Manifesto by Assyrian nationalist Freydun Atturaya

Urmia Manifesto of the United Free Assyria was written by Assyrian nationalist Freydun Atturaya, in his struggle for Assyrian independence during and after World War I. It was written in Syriac and completed in April 1917. Its ideology was Marxism, and it supported self regional independence for the Assyrian people in the Middle East. One of the goals of the manifesto was to form a trade and military alliance with Russia.

== Contents of The Urmian Manifesto of Unification and the Union of Free Assyria ==
1. The aim and aspiration of the Union of Free Assyria is the establishment, in the future, of national government in the following areas: Urmia, Mosul, Tur Abdin, Nisibin, Jazira, and Jularmeg, and, the reunification with the great and free Russia in trade, industry, and military relations so as to be in a union with them.
2. The political installation of Free Assyria will be based upon the foundation of the Main National Assembly, which by its role will be the legislature and the executor of orders from the President and Ministers
3. National representatives in the Main National Assembly will be elected through the voting of all people without distinction for religion, position, ancestry or nationality. Every person, upon reaching the age of 20, has the right to vote in the election of representatives for the Main National Assembly. Elected representatives can be anyone between the ages of 25 and 60.
4. The right of landowners to dispose of lands will be taken from them and transferred to the people's authorities for the distribution of lands by their own determination.
5. The lands of the landlords, which have been appropriated through injustice and violence since olden times, will be taken from them regardless of national identity such lands will be credited to the property of all people, and by the order of their power, will be transferred to farmers who will handle them for their needs without paying any fee. If the land is brought by someone at his own expense, proven by notarial agreements and merchant documents, it will be taken by the authorities, but not without the payment to the owner of the land's value. All gold, silver, lead, coal fossils, forests, mineral waters, etc. is to be taken away and credited to the property of the people under the control of the people's government.
6. Every son and daughter of the Assyrian people is equal by the laws of the Union of Free Assyria, i.e. there is no difference between the rich and the poor, workers, etc. All inhabitants under the rule of the Union of Free Assyria will be only citizens and free citizens.
7. Full freedom of speech, press, thought, different assembly, union, and of strike under the condition of not harming another person's honor.
8. Taxes will be distributed among all inhabitants of the Union of Free Assyria without exception, but according to condition and earning of each.
9. All children under the age of 15 years must be enrolled in schools in the Union of Free Assyria for immediate learning.
10. There will be a separation of the clergy from civil life in the Union of Free Assyria. Moreover, the clergy are not in any way to interfere with national and legal affairs.
11. A party of Social Democrats is to be organized to guide all workers in the present under the program of Marx and Engels.
12. The abolition of unfair taxes, as these generally fall only on poor workers and farmers.
13. The representatives of all other nationalities, living in the Union of Free Assyria, can freely live their lives, and the rights and laws of the Union, which will enter into force through the Main National Assembly.
14. Throughout the territories of the Union of Free Assyria, the mandatory language in schools is Assyrian.
15. Dissemination of the aforementioned thoughts among the people, the organization of the branches of the national union in all villages and other locations, and the election of village committees, which will have a representative in the Central National Assembly.
16. Preparation for the impending peace after the war, so that all stated regulations have been presented and declared to all of Europe and the future congress.
17. Appointment of two official representatives on behalf of the Union to the aforementioned congress and restoration of the rights of the Assyrian people.
18. Appointment of one or two representatives to America to attract foreign Assyrians to the Union of Free Assyria. The same reunion with Assyrians from Mesopotamia, Nsvynva, Mosul, Russia, etc.
19. Publication of a popular leaflet of the Union for the widespread dissemination of the foundations for freedom.
20. Popular reading (lecture), speech and the arrangement of performances in pursuit of these goals.

== See also ==
- Assyrian Socialist Party
