= Urmia Plain =

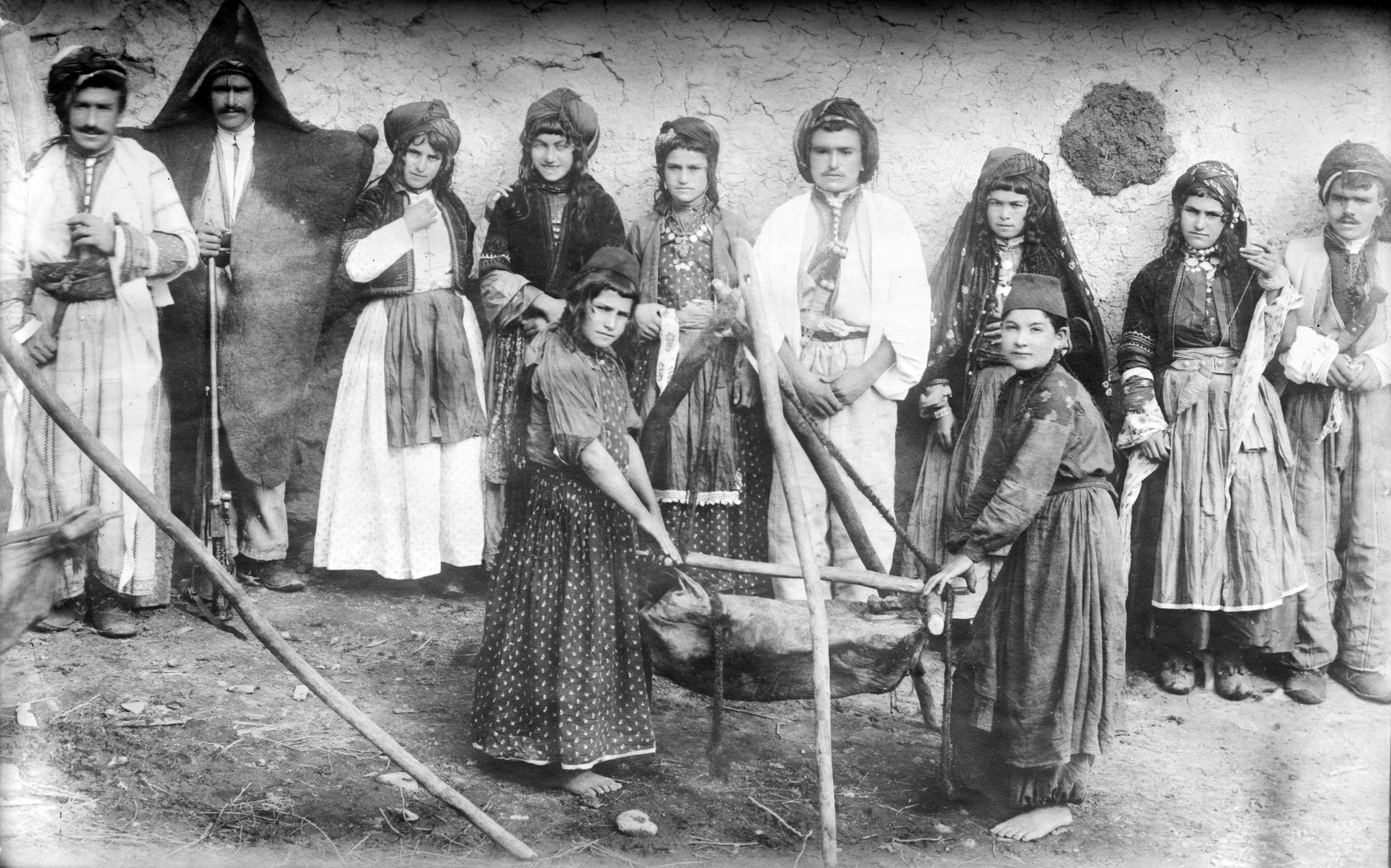
Assyrian Christian family making butter in Urmia Plain (Mawana), Persia, date unknown

Urmia Plain (Persian: جلگه ارومیه; Azerbaijani: Urmu düzü) is a region in the West Azerbaijan Province of Iran. It lies between Lake Urmia to the east, and the Turkish border to the west. It contains the city of Urmia.

The inhabitants of the Urmia Plain are Azerbaijani people and Kurds with a minority of Assyrian and Armenians. The Assyrian of Urmia speak Northeastern Neo-Aramaic dialects and are religiously diverse, adhering to the East Syriac churches (mostly to the Assyrian Church of the East and the Chaldean Catholic Church), and Protestantism.

== See also ==
- Nineveh Plains
