= Assyrian homeland =

Areas historically inhabited by Assyrians

Assyria ܐܬܘܪ (Syriac) Āṯōr
- Flag Star of Shamash

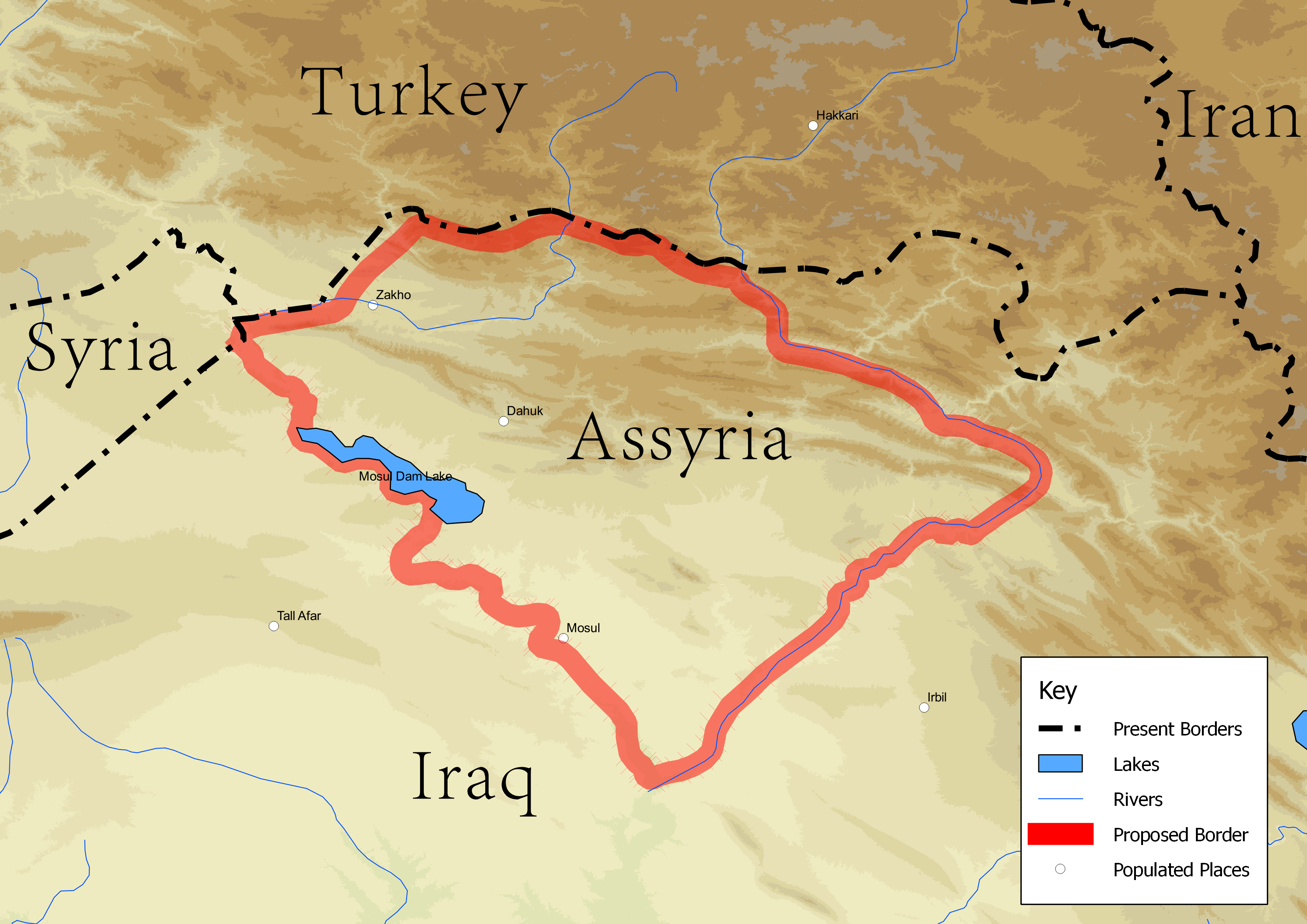
- The Assyrian Triangle was the proposed borders for an autonomous Assyrian state following World War I.
- Main languages: Neo-Aramaic; Mesopotamian Arabic; Turkish; Kurdish; Persian
- Today part of: Iraq (Mesopotamia); Iran (margin in western Urmia Plain and Salmas area); Syria (Mesopotamia); Turkey (Mesopotamia)

The Assyrian homeland or Assyria (Syriac: ܐܬܘܪ, romanized: Āṯōr) is the homeland of the Assyrian people within which Assyrian civilisation developed, located in the Upper Mesopotamia of West Asia. The territory that forms the Assyrian homeland is, similarly to the rest of Mesopotamia, currently divided between present-day Iraq, Turkey, Iran and Syria. In Iran, the Urmia Plain forms a thin margin of the ancestral Assyrian homeland in the north-west, and the only section of the Assyrian homeland beyond the Mesopotamian region. The majority of Assyrians in Iran currently reside in the capital city, Tehran.

The Assyrians are one of several indigenous Mesopotamian groups, claiming descent from ancient Assyria.The ancient Assyrians developed an independent civilisation in the city of Assur on the eastern border of northern Mesopotamia. The ancient Assyrian territory was divided through the centre by the Tigris River, with Mesopotamia on the west and the western margins of the Urmia Plains to the east. In modern times, Assyrians largely only recognise Assyrian towns and cities immediately neighbouring the Tigris to the east as their indigenous territory, in addition to Mesopotamia, with their homeland only expanding beyond the borders due to the major centres of Assyrian civilisation, such as the cities of Nineveh, Assur and Nimrud, being built on the banks of the Tigris itself.

Modern Assyrians are predominantly Christian, mostly adhering to the East and West Syriac liturgical rites of Christianity. They speak Neo-Aramaic languages, most common being Suret and Turoyo.

== History ==
=== Ancient period ===
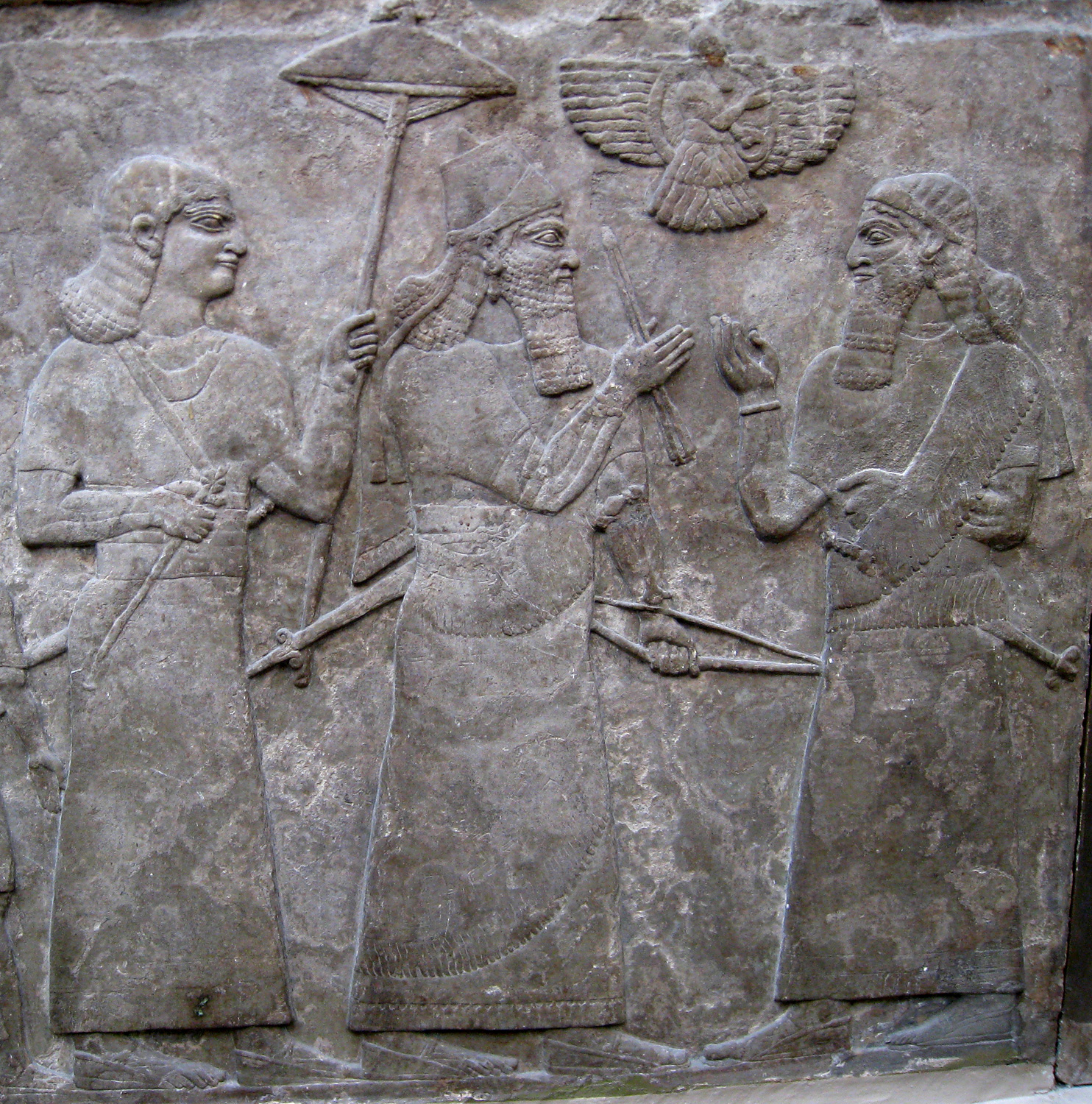
King Ashurnasirpal II of the Assyrian Empire meets a high official during a review of soldiers and war prisoners. He is accompanied by a parasol-bearer and is watched over by a winged deity (Ashur). He holds a bow and a pair of raised arrows, symbolising victory in battle. From the North-West Palace at Nimrud, Mesopotamia (modern-day Iraq), about 865-860 BC

The city of Aššur and Nineveh (modern-day Mosul), which was the oldest and largest city of the ancient Assyrian empire, together with a number of other Assyrian cities, seem to have been established by 2,600 BC. However it is likely that they were initially Sumerian-dominated administrative centres. In the late 26th century BC, Eannatum of Lagash, then the dominant Sumerian ruler in Mesopotamia, mentions "smiting Subartu" (Subartu being the Sumerian name for Assyria). Similarly, in c. the early 25th century BC, Lugal-Anne-Mundu the king of the Sumerian state of Adab lists Subartu as paying tribute to him.

Assyrians are eastern Aramaic-speaking, descending from pre-Islamic inhabitants of Upper Mesopotamia. The Old Aramaic language was adopted by the population of the Neo-Assyrian Empire from around the 8th century BC, and these eastern dialects remained in wide use throughout Upper Mesopotamia during the Persian and Roman periods, and survived through to the present day. The Syriac language evolved in Achaemenid Assyria during the 5th century BC.

During the Assyrian period Duhok was named Nohadra (and also Bit Nuhadra' or Naarda), where, during the Parthian-Sassanid rule in Assyria (c.160 BC to 250 AD) as Beth Nuhadra, gained semi-independence as one of a patchwork of Neo-Assyrian kingdoms in Assyria, which also included Adiabene, Osroene, Assur and Beth Garmai.

=== Early Christian period ===
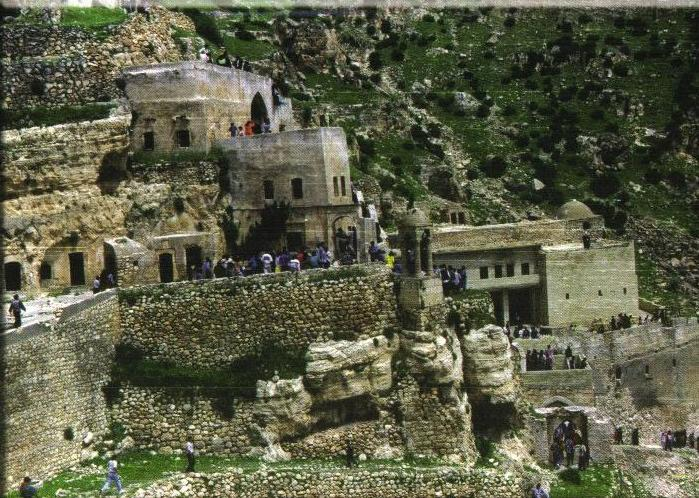
Rabban Hormizd Monastery, Alqosh, Nineveh, Iraq.

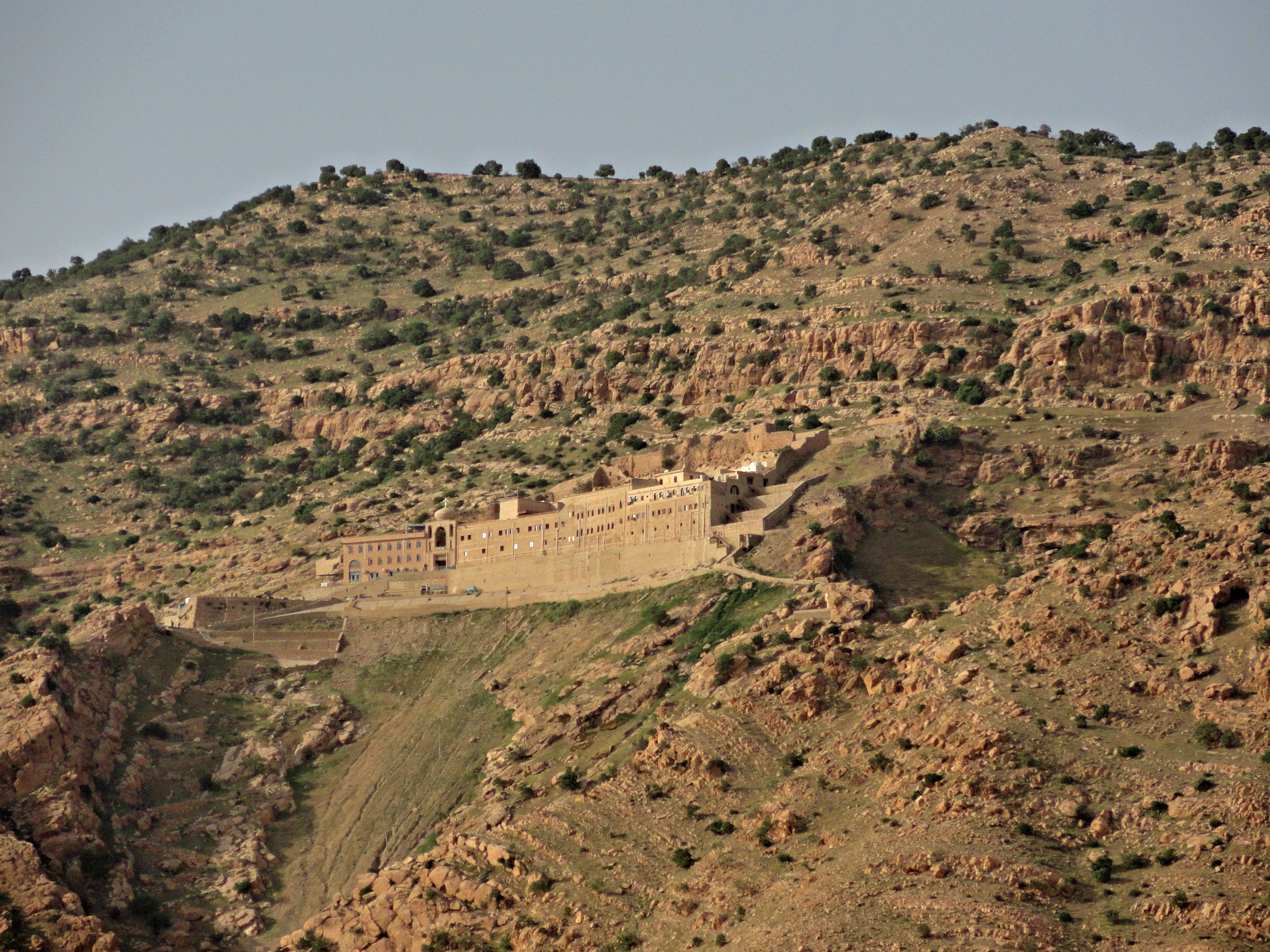
Mar Mattai Monastery in Assyrian village Merki, Nineveh, Iraq

Syriac Christianity took hold amongst the Assyrians between the 1st and 3rd centuries AD with the founding in Assyria of the Church of the East together with Syriac literature.

The first division between Syriac Christians occurred in the 5th century, when Upper Mesopotamian based Assyrian Christians of the Sassanid Persian Empire were separated from those in The Levant over the Nestorian Schism. This split owed just as much to the politics of the day as it did to theological orthodoxy. Ctesiphon, which was at the time the Sassanid capital, eventually became the capital of the Church of the East. During the Christian era Nuhadra became an eparchy within the Assyrian Church of the East metropolitanate of Ḥadyab (Erbil).

After the Council of Chalcedon in 451, many Syriac Christians within the Roman Empire rebelled against its decisions. The Patriarchate of Antioch was then divided between a Chalcedonian and non-Chalcedonian communion. The Chalcedonians were often labelled 'Melkites' (Emperor's Party), while their opponents were labelled as Monophysites (those who believe in the one rather than two natures of Christ) and Jacobites (after Jacob Baradaeus). The Maronite Church found itself caught between the two, but claims to have always remained faithful to the Catholic Church and in communion with the bishop of Rome, the Pope.

=== Middle Ages ===
A map of Upper Mesopotamia in medieval times. Since the early Muslim conquests of the mid-7th century, the region has been known by the traditional Arabic name of al-Jazira (Arabic: الجزيرة "the island")

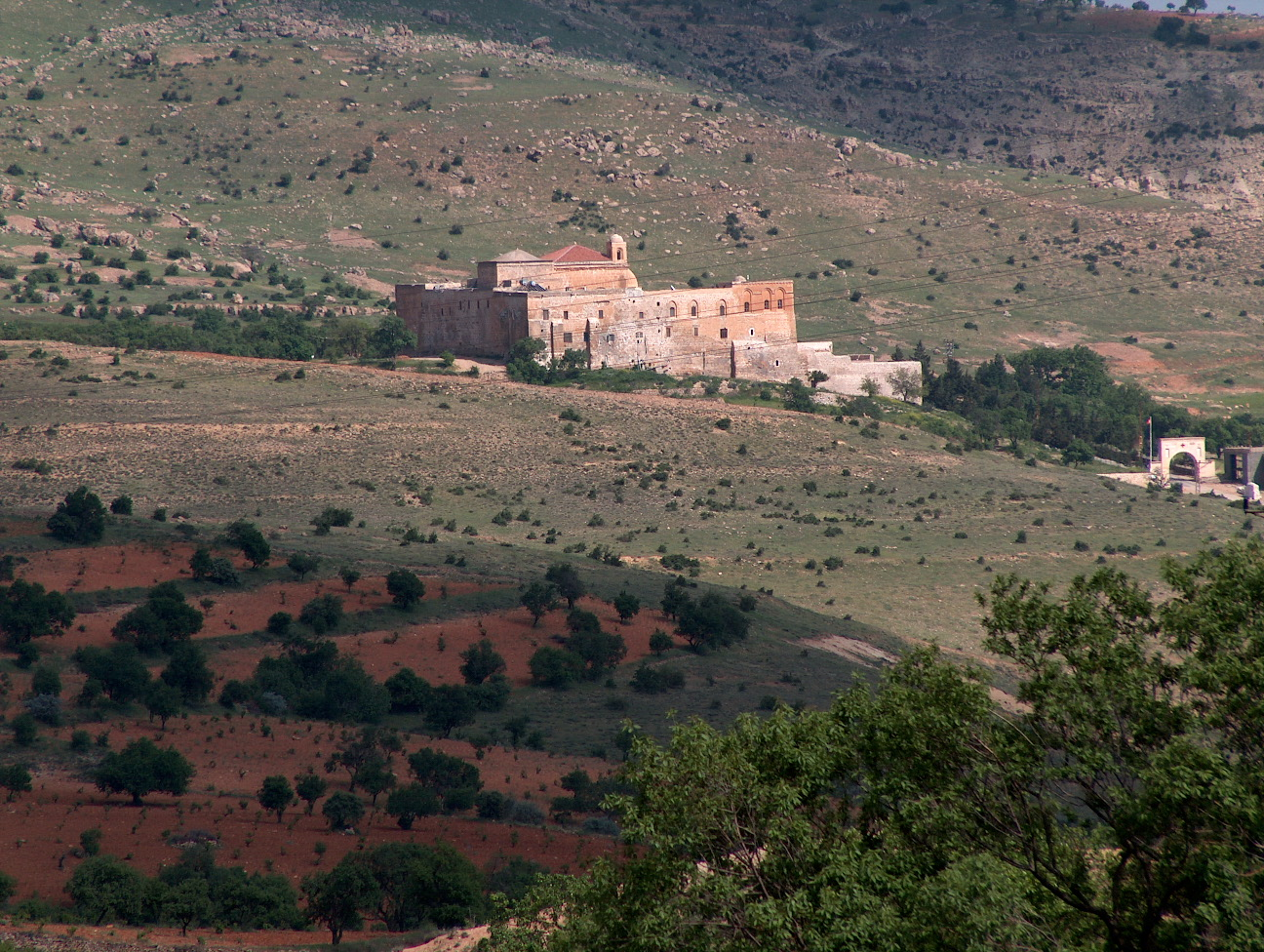
Mor Hananyo Monastery, or The Saffron Monastery in the Tur Abdin region.

Both Syriac Christianity and the Eastern Aramaic language came under pressure following the Arab Islamic conquest of Mesopotamia in the 7th century, and Assyrian Christians throughout the Middle Ages were subjected to Arabizing superstrate influence. The Assyrians suffered a significant persecution with the religiously motivated large scale massacres conducted by the Muslim Turco-Mongol ruler Tamurlane in the 14th century AD. It was from this time that the ancient city of Assur was abandoned by Assyrians, and Assyrians were reduced to a minority within their ancient homeland.

Upper Mesopotamia had an established structure of dioceses by AD 500 following the introduction of Christianity from the 1st to 3rd centuries AD. After the fall of the Neo-Assyrian Empire by 605 BC Assyria remained an entity for over 1200 years under Babylonian, Achamaenid Persian, Seleucid Greek, Parthian, Roman and Sassanid Persian rule. It was only after the Arab-Islamic conquest of the second half of the 7th century AD that Assyria as a named region was dissolved.

The mountainous region of the Assyrian homeland, Barwari, which was part of the diocese of Beth Nuhadra (current day Dohuk), saw a mass migration of Nestorians after the fall of Baghdad in 1258 and Timurlane's invasion from central Iraq. Its Christian inhabitants were little affected by the Ottoman conquests, however starting from the 19th century Kurdish Emirs sought to expand their territories at their expense. In the 1830s Muhammad Rawanduzi, the Emir of Soran, tried to forcibly add the region to his dominion pillaging many Assyrian villages. Bedr Khan Beg of Bohtan renewed attacks on the region in the 1840s, killing tens of thousands of Assyrians in Barwari and Hakkari before being ultimately defeated by the Ottomans.

In 1552, a schism occurred within the Church of the East: the established "Eliya line" of patriarchs was opposed by a rival patriarch, Sulaqa, who initiated what is called the "Shimun line". He and his early successors entered into communion with the Catholic Church, but in the course of over a century their link with Rome grew weak and was openly renounced in 1672, when Shimun XIII Dinkha adopted a profession of faith that contradicted that of Rome, while he maintained his independence from the "Eliya line". Leadership of those who wished to be in communion with Rome passed to the Archbishop of Amid Joseph I, recognized first by the Turkish civil authorities (1677) and then by Rome itself (1681).

A century and a half later, in 1830, headship of the Catholics was conferred on Yohannan Hormizd. Yohannan was a member of the "Eliya line" family, but he opposed the last of that line to be elected in the normal way as patriarch, Ishoʿyahb (1778–1804), most of whose followers he won over to communion with Rome, after he himself was irregularly elected in 1780, as Sulaqa was in 1552. The "Shimun line" that in 1553 entered communion with Rome and broke it off in 1672 is now that of the church that in 1976 officially adopted the name "Assyrian Church of the East", while a member of the "Eliya line" family is one of the patriarchs of the Chaldean Catholic Church.

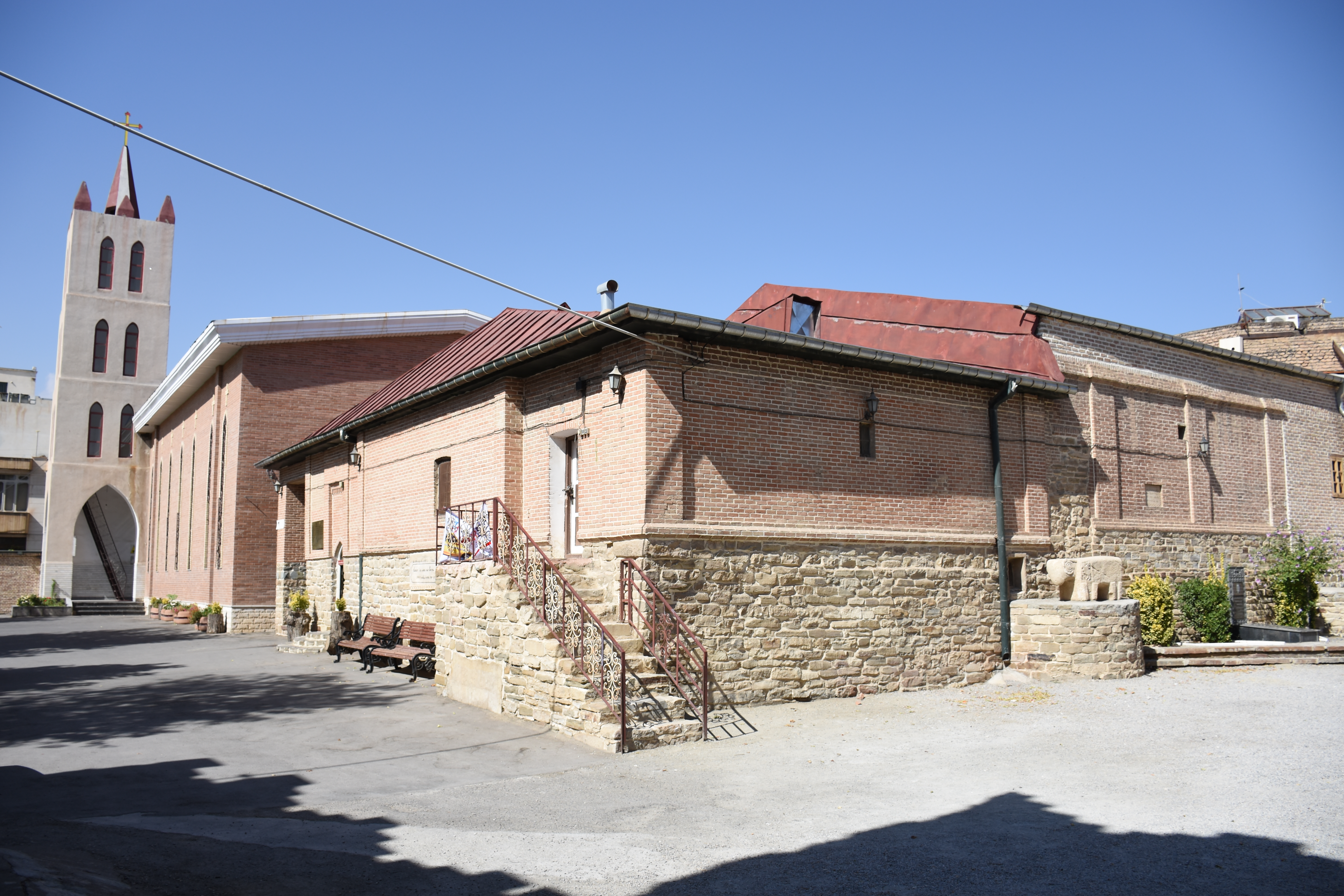
Saint Mary Church: an ancient Assyrian church located in the city of Urmia, West Azerbaijan Province, Iran.

For many centuries, from at least the time of Jerome (c. 347 – 420), the term "Chaldean" indicated the Aramaic language and was still the normal name in the nineteenth century. Only in 1445 did it begin to be used to mean Aramaic speakers in communion with the Catholic Church, on the basis of a decree of the Council of Florence, which accepted the profession of faith that Timothy, metropolitan of the Aramaic speakers in Cyprus, made in Aramaic, and which decreed that "nobody shall in future dare to call [...] Chaldeans, Nestorians".

Previously, when there were as yet no Catholic Aramaic speakers of Mesopotamian origin, the term "Chaldean" was applied with explicit reference to their "Nestorian" religion. Thus Jacques de Vitry wrote of them in 1220/1 that "they denied that Mary was the Mother of God and claimed that Christ existed in two persons. They consecrated leavened bread and used the 'Chaldean' (Syriac) language". Until the second half of the 19th century the term "Chaldean" continued in general use for East Syriac Christians, whether "Nestorian" or Catholic: it was the West Syriacs who were reported as claiming descent from Asshur, the second son of Shem.

=== Early modern period ===
Peutinger's map of the inhabited world known to the Roman geographers depicts Singara as located west of the Trogoditi. Persi. (Latin: Troglodytae Persiae, "Persian troglodytes") who inhabited the territory around Mount Sinjar. By the medieval Arabs, most of the plain was reckoned as part of the province of Diyār Rabīʿa, the "abode of the Rabīʿa" tribe. The plain was the site of the determination of the degree by al-Khwārizmī and other astronomers during the reign of the caliph al-Mamun. Sinjar boasted a famous Assyrian cathedral in the 8th century.

Syria and Upper Mesopotamia became part of the Ottoman Empire in the 16th century, following the conquests of Suleiman the Magnificent.

=== Modern period ===
A traditional Christian Ceremony of "Oshana"

During World War I the Assyrians of Anatolia suffered the Assyrian genocide which reduced their numbers by up to 40-50%. Subsequent to this, they entered the war on the side of the British and Russians. After World War I, the Assyrian homeland was divided between the British Mandate of Mesopotamia, which would become the Kingdom of Iraq in 1932, and the French Mandate of Syria which would become the Syrian Arab Republic in 1944.

Assyrians faced reprisals under the Hashemite monarchy for co-operating with the British during the years after World War I, and many fled to the West. The Patriarch Shimun XXI Eshai, though born into the line of Patriarchs at Qochanis, was educated in Britain. For a time he sought a homeland for the Assyrians in Iraq but was forced to take refuge in Cyprus in 1933, later moving to Chicago, Illinois, and finally settling near San Francisco, California.

The Chaldean Christian community was less numerous than the Assyrian refugees that were displaced during World War I and vociferous at the time of the British Mandate of Mesopotamia, and did not play a major role in the British rule of the country. However, with the exodus of Assyrian Church of the East members from Anatolia, the Chaldean Catholic Church became the largest non-Muslim religious denomination in Iraq, and some Assyrian Catholics later rose to power in the Ba'ath Party government, the most prominent being Deputy Prime Minister Tariq Aziz. The Anatolian Assyrians that settled in Dohuk boast one of the largest churches in the region named the Mar Marsi Cathedral, and is the center of an Eparchy. Tens of thousands of Yazidi and Assyrian Christian refugees live in the city as well due to the ISIS invasion of Iraq in 2014 and the subsequent Fall of Mosul

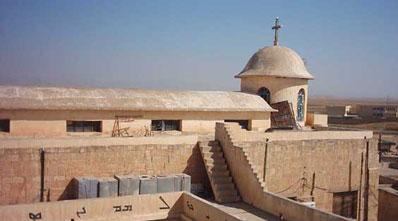
A Chaldean Catholic church in Tesqopa

In addition to the Assyrian population, an Aramaic speaking Jewish population existed in the region for thousands of years, living mainly in Barwari, Zakho and Alqosh. However, all of the Barwari Jews either left or were exiled to Israel shortly after its independence in 1947. The region was heavily affected by the Kurdish uprisings during the 1950s and 60s and was largely depopulated during the Al-Anfal campaign in the 1980s, although some of its population later returned and their homes were subsequently rebuilt. Assur, which is in the Saladin Governorate, was put on UNESCO's List of World Heritage in danger in 2003, at which time the site was threatened by a looming large-scale dam project that would have submerged the ancient archaeological site.

==== Attacks on Christians ====
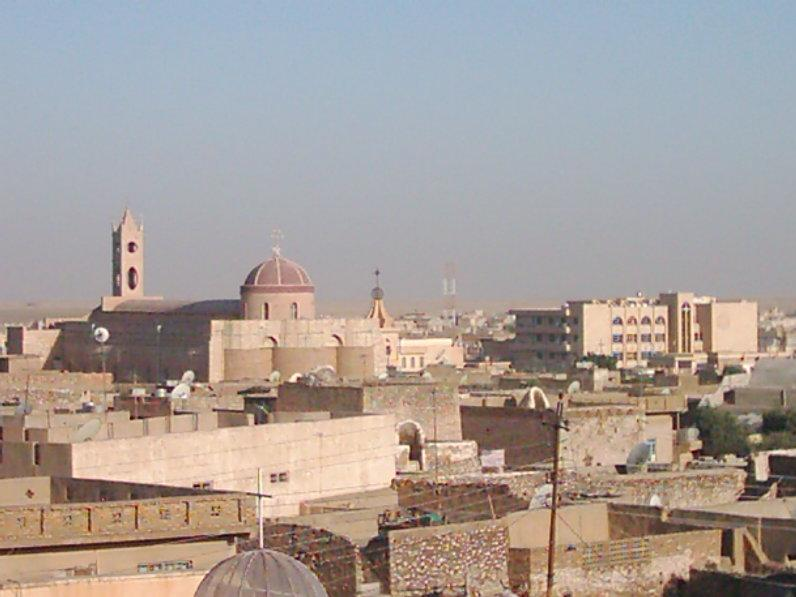
The Assyrian city of Bakhdida, in the Nineveh Plains

Following the concerted attacks on Assyrian Christians in Iraq, especially highlighted by the Sunday, August 1, 2004, simultaneous bombing of six Churches (Baghdad and Mosul) and subsequent bombing of nearly thirty other churches throughout the country, Assyrian leadership, internally and externally, began to regard the Nineveh Plains as the location where security for Christians may be possible. Schools especially received much attention in this area and in Kurdish areas where Assyrian concentrated population lives. In addition, agriculture and medical clinics received financial help from the Assyrian diaspora.

As attacks on Christians increased in Basra, Baghdad, Ramadi and smaller towns more families turned northward to the extended family holdings in the Nineveh Plain. This place of refuge remains underfunded and gravely lacking in infrastructure to aid the ever-increasing internally displaced people population. From 2012, it also began receiving influxes of Assyrians from Syria owing to the civil war there.

In August 2014 nearly all of the non-Sunni inhabitants of the southern regions of the Plains, which include Tel Keppe, Bakhdida, Bartella and Karamlesh were driven out by the Islamic State of Iraq and the Levant during the 2014 Northern Iraq offensive. Upon entering the town, ISIS looted the homes, and removed the crosses and other religious objects from the churches. The Christian cemetery in the town was also later destroyed. Assyrian Bronze Age and Iron Age monuments and archaeological sites, as well as numerous Assyrian churches and monasteries have been systematically vandalized and destroyed by ISIL. These include the ruins of Nineveh, Kalhu (Nimrud, Assur, Dur-Sharrukin and Hatra). ISIL destroyed a 3,000 year-old Ziggurat. ISIL destroyed Virgin Mary Church, in 2015 St. Markourkas Church was destroyed and the cemetery was bulldozed.

Soon after the beginning of the Battle of Mosul Iraqi troops advanced on Tel Keppe, but the fighting continued into 2017. Iraqi forces recaptured the town from ISIS on 19 January 2017.

== Geography ==
=== Climate ===
Owing to its latitude and altitude, the Assyrian homeland is cooler and much wetter than most of Iraq. Most areas in the region fall within the Mediterranean climate zone (Csa), with areas to the southwest being semi-arid (BSh).

Climate data for Tel Keppe
Month	Jan	Feb	Mar	Apr	May	Jun	Jul	Aug	Sep	Oct	Nov	Dec	Year
Mean daily maximum °C (°F)	12 (54)	14 (57)	20 (68)	26 (79)	34 (93)	38 (100)	43 (109)	40 (104)	38 (100)	30 (86)	20 (68)	14 (57)	27 (81)
Mean daily minimum °C (°F)	2 (36)	4 (39)	8 (46)	11 (52)	16 (61)	21 (70)	25 (77)	24 (75)	20 (68)	14 (57)	6 (43)	4 (39)	13 (55)
Average precipitation mm (inches)	39 (1.5)	69 (2.7)	51 (2.0)	9 (0.4)	0 (0)	0 (0)	0 (0)	0 (0)	0 (0)	6 (0.2)	36 (1.4)	60 (2.4)	270 (10.6)
Average precipitation days	10	10	11	9	0	0	0	0	0	5	8	12	65
Source: World Weather Online (2000-2012)

Climate data for Zakho
Month	Jan	Feb	Mar	Apr	May	Jun	Jul	Aug	Sep	Oct	Nov	Dec	Year
Mean daily maximum °C (°F)	10.2 (50.4)	12.2 (54.0)	16.5 (61.7)	21.8 (71.2)	29.1 (84.4)	36.2 (97.2)	40.4 (104.7)	40.0 (104.0)	35.7 (96.3)	27.9 (82.2)	19.4 (66.9)	12.3 (54.1)	25.1 (77.3)
Mean daily minimum °C (°F)	1.9 (35.4)	3.1 (37.6)	6.1 (43.0)	10.1 (50.2)	15.0 (59.0)	20.1 (68.2)	23.7 (74.7)	23.2 (73.8)	19.2 (66.6)	13.7 (56.7)	8.4 (47.1)	3.9 (39.0)	12.4 (54.3)
Average precipitation mm (inches)	144 (5.7)	136 (5.4)	129 (5.1)	109 (4.3)	43 (1.7)	0 (0)	0 (0)	0 (0)	1 (0.0)	27 (1.1)	83 (3.3)	127 (5.0)	799 (31.6)

== Demographics ==
A map of Tur Abdin showing Syriac villages and monasteries. Operational monasteries are indicated by red crosses, and abandoned monasteries are indicated by orange crosses

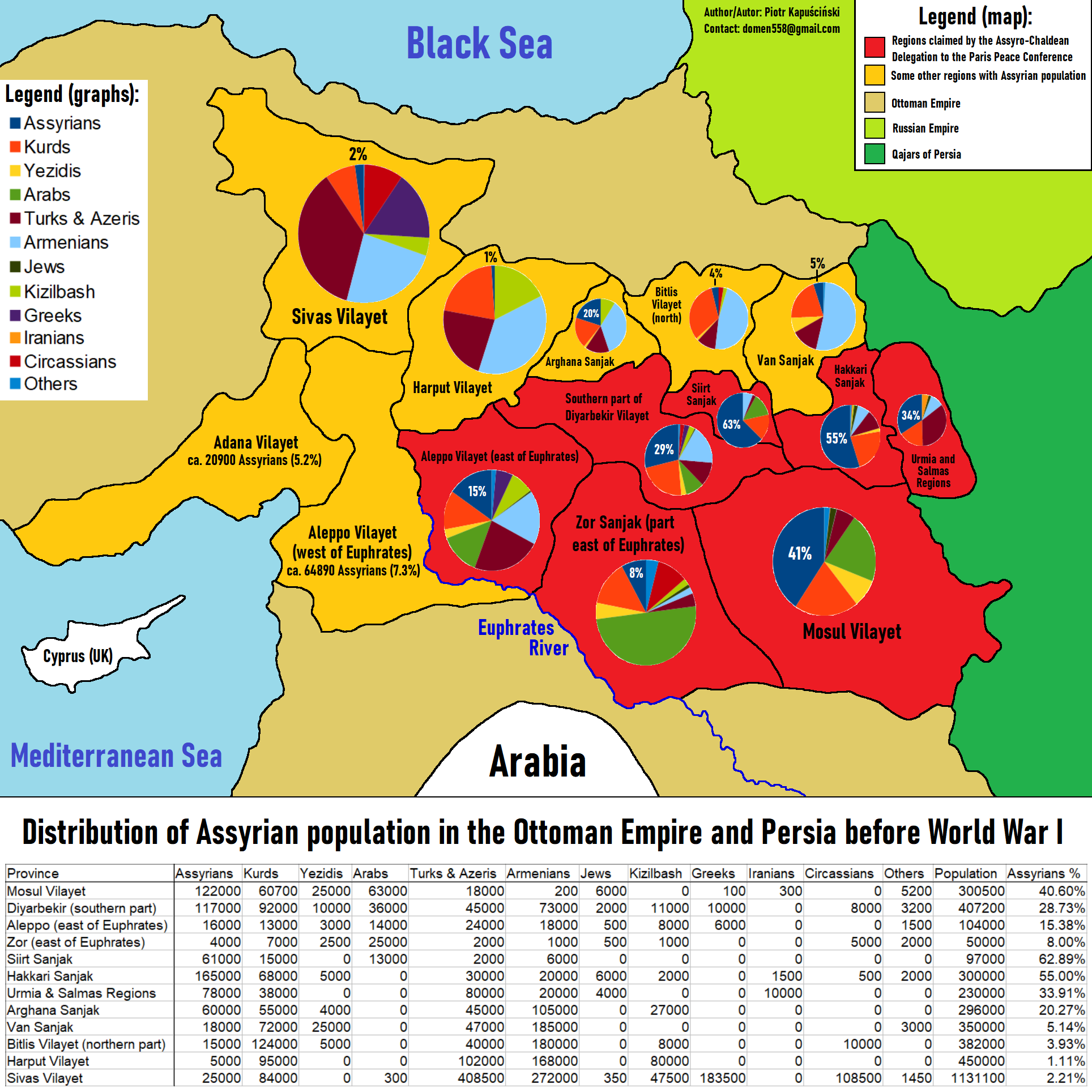
Assyrian population in the Ottoman Empire and Persia before World War I

Assyrian populations are distributed between the Assyrian homeland and the Assyrian diaspora. There are no official statistics, and estimates vary greatly, between less than one million in the Assyrian homeland, and 3.3 million with the diaspora included, mostly due to the uncertainty of the number of Assyrians in Iraq and Syria. Since the 2003 Iraq War, Iraqi Assyrians have been displaced into Syria in significant but unknown numbers. Since the Syrian Civil War began in 2011, Syrian Assyrians have been displaced into Turkey in significant but unknown numbers. The indigenous Assyrian homeland areas are "part of today's northern Iraq, southeastern Turkey, northwestern Iran and northeastern Syria".

The Assyrian communities that are still left in the Assyrian homeland are in Syria (400,000), Iraq (300,000), Iran (20,000), and Turkey (15,000–25,100). Most of the Assyrians living in Syria today, in the Al Hasakah Governorate in villages along the Khabur river, descend from refugees that arrived there after the Assyrian genocide and Simele massacre of the 1910s and 30s. Christian communities of Oriental Orthodox Syriacs lived in Tur Abdin, an area in Southeastern Turkey, Nestorian Assyrians lived in the Hakkari Mountains, which straddles the border of northern Iraq and Southern Turkey, as well as the Urmia Plain, an area located on the western bank of Lake Urmia, and Chaldean and Syriac Catholics lived in the Nineveh Plains, an area located in Northern Iraq.

More than half of Iraqi Christians have fled to neighboring countries since the start of the Iraq War, and many have not returned, although a number are migrating back to the traditional Assyrian homeland in the Kurdish Autonomous region. Most Assyrians nowadays live in northern Iraq, with the community in Northern (Turkish) Hakkari being completely decimated, and the ones in Tur Abdin and Urmia Plain are largely depopulated.

== Creation of an Assyrian autonomous province ==
The Assyrian-inhabited towns and villages on the Nineveh Plain form a concentration of those belonging to Syriac Christian traditions, and since this area is the ancient home of the Assyrian empire through which the Assyrian people trace their cultural heritage, the Nineveh Plain is the area on which an effort to form an autonomous Assyrian entity has become concentrated. There have been calls by some politicians inside and outside Iraq to create an autonomous region for Assyrian Christians in this area.

In the Transitional Administrative Law adopted in March 2004 in Baghdad, not only were provisions made for the preservation of Assyrian culture through education and media, but a provision for an administrative unit also was accepted. Article 125 in Iraq's Constitution states that: "This Constitution shall guarantee the administrative, political, cultural, and educational rights of the various nationalities, such as Turkomen, Chaldeans, Assyrians, and all other constituents, and this shall be regulated by law."

On January 21, 2014, the Iraqi government had declared that Nineveh Plains would become a new province, which would serve as a safe haven for Assyrians. After the liberation of the Nineveh Plain from ISIL between 2016/17, all Assyrian political parties called on the European Union and UN Security Council for the creation of an Assyrian self-administered province in the Nineveh Plain.

Between the 28th-30 June 2017, a conference was held in Brussels dubbed, The Future for Christians in Iraq. The conference was organised by the European People's Party and had participants extending from Assyrian/Chaldean/Syriac organizations, including representatives from the Iraqi government and the KRG. The conference was boycotted by the Assyrian Democratic Movement, Sons of Mesopotamia, Assyrian Patriotic Party, Chaldean Catholic Church and Assyrian Church of the East. A position paper was signed by the remaining political organizations involved.

== See also ==
- Beth Nahrain
- List of Assyrian settlements
- Persian Assyria
- Asōristān
- Kurdistan
