= Assyrians =

Ethnic group native to Mesopotamia

ܣܘܪ̈ܝܐ / ܣܘܪ̈ܝܝܐ / ܐܬܘܪܝܐ / ܐܫܘܪܝܐ

Total population
- c. 3–5 million

Regions with significant populations
- Homeland: Numbers may vary
- Iraq: c. 140,000–600,000
- Syria: 400,000–877,000 (pre-Syrian civil war)
- Iran: c. 20,000–55,000
- Turkey: 25,000–30,000
- Diaspora: Numbers may vary
- United States: 600,000
- Sweden: 150,000–200,000
- Germany: 100,000–180,000
- Jordan: 30,000–150,000
- Australia: 60,000–70,000
- Lebanon: 50,000
- Netherlands: 25,000–35,000
- Canada: 31,800
- France: 30,000
- Greece: 6,000
- Austria: 2,500–5,000
- Russia: 4,421
- United Kingdom: 3,000–4,000
- Palestine: 1,500–5,000
- Ukraine: 3,143
- Italy: 3,000
- Armenia: 2,755
- Georgia: 2,377
- New Zealand: 1,497
- Israel: 1,000
- Denmark: 700
- Kazakhstan: 350

Languages
- Neo-Aramaic (Suret · Turoyo) · Liturgical: Classical Syriac

Religion
- Predominantly: Syriac Christianity; Minorities: Eastern Protestant Christianity

Assyrians (Syriac: ܣܘܪ̈ܝܐ, romanized: Sūrāyē / Sūrōyē) are a distinct ethnic group native to Mesopotamia with roots in ancient Assyria. They speak varieties of Neo-Aramaic, a branch of the Semitic language family, and largely adhere to Syriac Christianity. The Assyrian homeland lies in northern Mesopotamia, encompassing areas along the Zab rivers and spanning parts of modern Turkey, Iran, Iraq, and Syria. Large-scale displacement has led to a diaspora across North America, Europe, Australia, the Middle East, and the Caucasus, fueled by genocide, persecution, and regional conflicts. In the United States, Assyrians have preserved and adapted their cultural identity, with notable communities in the Midwest and California. Some members of the community identify alternatively as Chaldeans or Arameans, based on religious, regional, and historic traditions.

Assyrians have a continuous cultural and linguistic presence spanning over three millennia. Originally speaking Akkadian, they adopted Aramaic which became a regional lingua franca spoken by Jesus of Nazareth that influenced Hebrew and Arabic. Today, they speak modern Neo-Aramaic dialects with Akkadian roots (primarily Suret and Turoyo) and primarily practice Syriac Christianity across two rites. These include the Chaldean Catholic Church, Assyrian Church of the East, and the Ancient Church of the East in the East Syriac Rite, and the Syriac Catholic and Syriac Orthodox churches in the West Syriac Rite. Aramaic remains one of the oldest continuously used languages in West Asia.

They were among the earliest peoples to adopt Christianity, traditionally tracing its introduction to the 1st century AD through the missionary work of St. Thomas the Apostle and his disciples, St. Addai and St. Mari. The Assyrians established the Church of the East and the distinct East Syriac Rite, playing a central role in spreading Christianity across Asia. They are broadly distinguished into three principal ecclesiastical traditions, divided by liturgy, dialect, theology, and historical development. Shared historical experiences, including early Christianisation and episodes of persecution, have fostered close ties with neighbouring Armenians.

== Etymology ==
Linguistically, the name Assyria is rooted in East Semitic nomenclature. Biblical traditions connect the name to Ashur, the son of Shem in the Book of Genesis, who was traditionally regarded as the eponymous patriarch of the Assyrian nation. The earliest attestations trace back to the early 3rd millennium BC, originating from the ancient city-state and capital of Assur (Akkadian: 𒀸𒋩𒆠, Aššūr). In international statecraft and neighboring languages, the designation evolved phonetically: in Old Persian inscriptions such as the Behistun Inscription, it is recorded as Aššura or Āthur, while in Babylonian and Elamite contexts it appeared as Aššuru and Aššura. Ancient Greek historians and geographers later Hellenized the term as Assyria (Ἀσσυρία), a convention subsequently adopted into Latin and modern European languages.

Modern Assyrians refer to themselves primarily as Āṯōrāyē (ܐܬܘܪ̈ܝܐ) or Sūrāyē/Suroye (ܣܘܪ̈ܝܐ), a variant of Classical Syriac. This ethnonym is closely linked to the self-designations of Aramaic-speaking Christians in Mesopotamia. During the late antiquity period, these communities adopted the term Sūryoyo, an Aramaic adaptation of the Greek Súrios. This term gradually replaced the older Aramaic autonym Armāyā ("Aramean") in literary, liturgical, and vernacular contexts, though both names continued to be used side by side well into the medieval period.

== History ==
=== Pre-Christian history ===
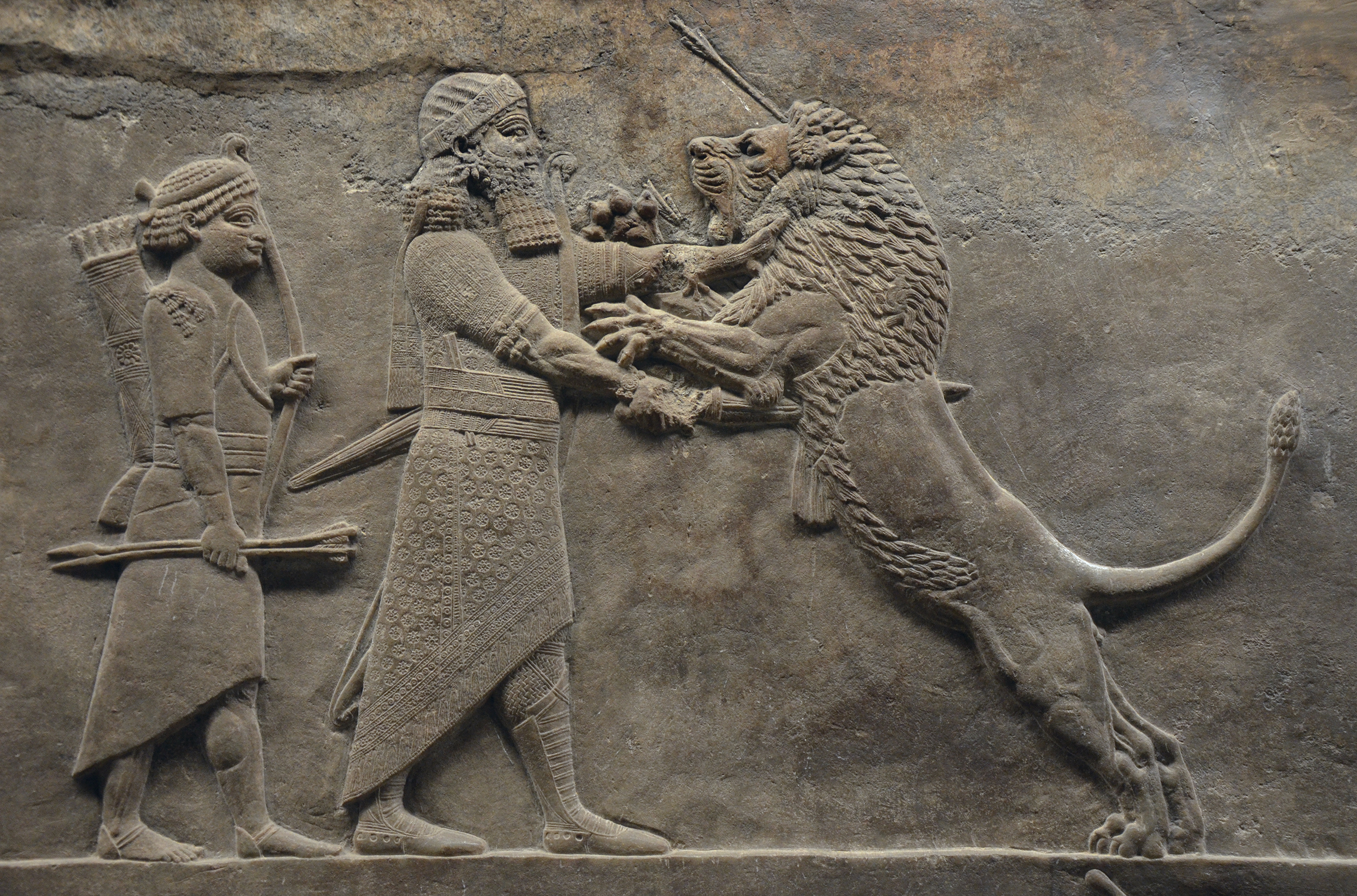
Part of the Lion Hunt of Ashurbanipal, c. 645–635 BC

Assyria is the homeland of the Assyrian people, located in the ancient Near East. The earliest Neolithic sites in Assyria belonged to the Jarmo culture c. 7100 BC and Tell Hassuna, the centre of the Hassuna culture, c. 6000 BC.

The history of Assyria begins with the formation of the city of Assur, perhaps as early as the 25th century BC. Although the ancient Assyrians were part of the Akkadian-speaking Semitic peoples of Mesopotamia, the Hurrians may also have played an important role in the origins and civilization of the Assyrians. Ephraim A. Speiser for instance, wrote that the influence of the Hurrians upon Assyria was more fundamental and far-reaching than is ordinarily implied, and they entered prominently into the "make-up" of the later Assyrians.

During the early Bronze Age period, Sargon of Akkad united all the native Semitic-speaking peoples, including the Assyrians, and the Sumerians of Mesopotamia under the Akkadian Empire (2335–2154 BC). At this time, the city of Assur already existed and would later become the heart of the Assyrian Empire. Under Sennacherib, Nineveh became Assyria's capital and was extensively expanded, covering about 750 hectares—more than twice the size of Calah or Dur-Sharrukin—and emerging as the largest and potentially wealthiest city of the ancient world. Some scholars suggest that the famed Hanging Gardens, often attributed to Babylon, may in fact have been located in Nineveh. Prior to the rise of Nineveh, the Assyrian city of Nimrud (ancient Kalhu) emerged as the largest urban center in the world by around 800 BC. The city was established as the royal seat and military capital by Ashurnasirpal II, whose extensive building programs on the Acropolis and outer town significantly expanded Kalhu and enhanced its political and cultural significance in the Neo-Assyrian Empire.

In their early stages, Assyrian cities such as Assur and Nineveh appear to have functioned as administrative centers under Sumerian control rather than as independent political entities. Over time, the Sumerian population was gradually absorbed into the broader Akkadian-speaking (Assyro-Babylonian) populace. An Assyrian identity distinct from other neighboring groups appears to have formed during the Old Assyrian period, in the 21st or 20th century BC.

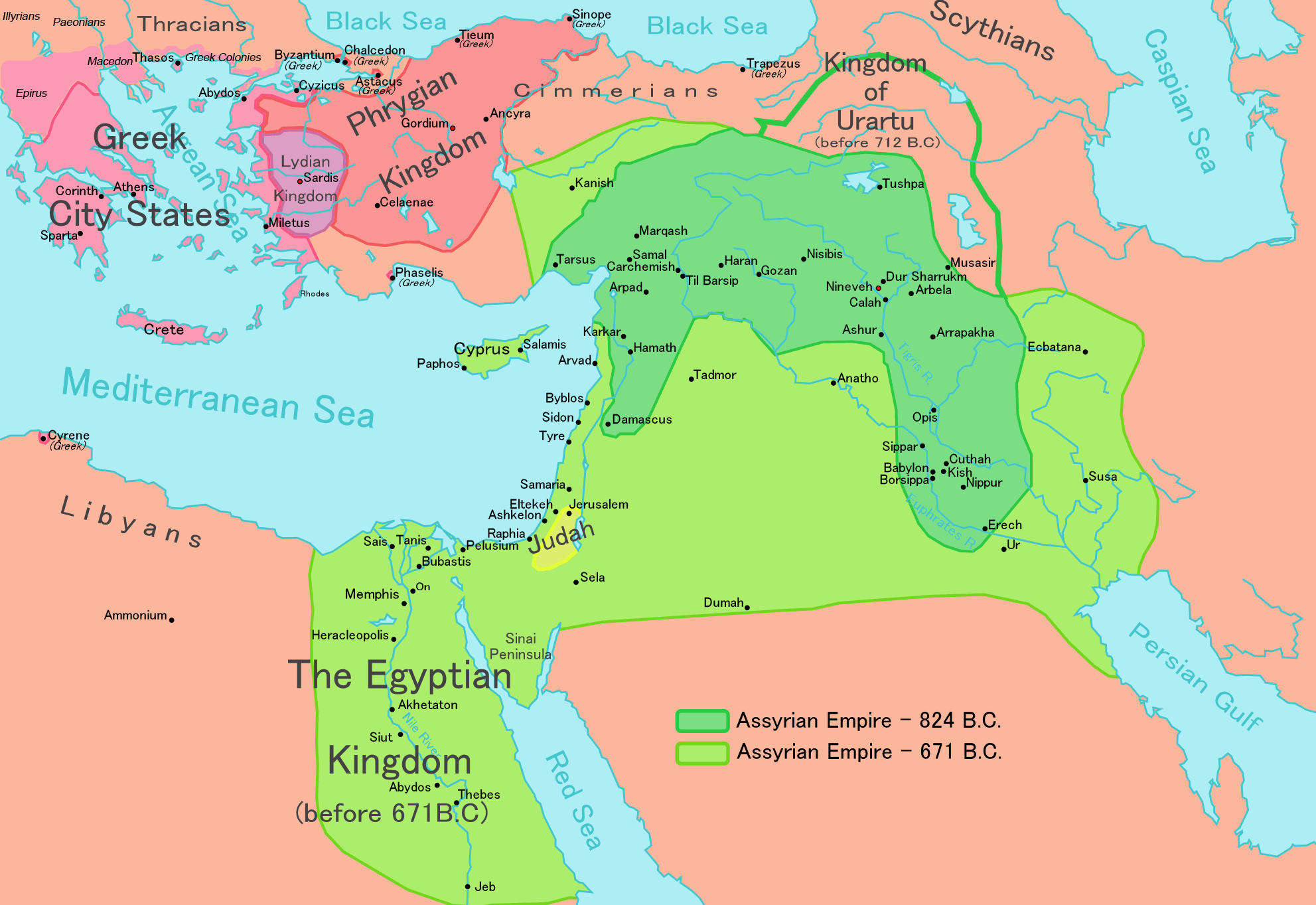
A map of the Neo-Assyrian Empire under Shalmaneser III (dark green) and Esarhaddon (light green)

In the traditions of the Assyrian Church of the East, they are descended from Abraham's grandson, Dedan son of Jokshan, progenitor of the ancient Assyrians. However, there is no other historical basis for this assertion. The Hebrew Bible does not directly mention it, and there is no mention in Assyrian records, which date as far back as the 25th century BC. What is known is that Ashur-uballit I overthrew the Mitanni c. 1365 BC and the Assyrians benefited from this development by taking control of the eastern portion of Mitanni territory and later annexing Hittite, Babylonian, Amorite and Hurrian territories. The rise and rule of the Middle Assyrian Empire (14th to 10th century BC) spread Assyrian culture, people and identity across northern Mesopotamia.

By the late eighth century BC, Assyria had become the largest and most formidable empire yet established, with the most powerful army assembled up to that time and pioneering military techniques—including cavalry and advanced siege equipment—that influenced warfare for more than two millennia. Its success relied not only on military strength but also on a highly efficient bureaucracy and a vast administrative and trade network stretching from the Persian Gulf to Egypt.

The excessive expansion of the Assyrian Empire, combined with internal conflict during the reign of Ashurbanipal and the widespread resentment provoked by its oppressive rule, significantly undermined the state's stability and strength. The Babylonians and Medes formed an alliance and captured Nineveh in 612 BC. After a final defeat at Harran in 609 BC, the empire fell. Despite this, Assyria's culture and administrative practices influenced the subsequent Babylonian and Persian empires.

The Assyrian people, after the fall of the Neo-Assyrian Empire in 609 BC, were under the control of the Neo-Babylonian Empire and later, the Persian Empire, which consumed the entire Neo-Babylonian or "Chaldean" Empire in 539 BC. Assyrians became front line soldiers for the Persian Empire under Xerxes I, playing a significant role in the Battle of Marathon under Darius I in 490 BC. However, Herodotus, whose Histories are the primary source of information about that battle, makes no mention of Assyrians in connection with it.

Despite the influx of foreign elements, the presence of Assyrians is confirmed by the worship of the god Ashur. References to the name survive into the 3rd century AD. The Greeks, Parthians, and Romans had a relatively low level of integration with the local population in Mesopotamia, which allowed their cultures to survive. Semi-independent kingdoms influenced by Assyrian culture (Hatra, Adiabene, Osroene) and perhaps semi-autonomous Assyrian vassal states (Assur) sprung up in the east under Parthian rule, lasting until conquests by the Sasanian Empire in the region in the 3rd century AD.

==== Language ====
Modern Assyrian derives from ancient Aramaic, a Northwest Semitic languages. Around 700 BC, Aramaic gradually replaced Akkadian, an East Semitic language, in the Near East; bilingualism was common among Assyrian nationals before the fall of the Neo-Assyrian Empire in the late seventh century BC. The Aramaic currently spoken by Assyrians is the only variety that contains Assyrian-Akkadian loanwords, as opposed to Babylonian-Akkadian loanwords in Eastern Aramaic. Out of fourteen unique loanwords in Syriac, nine derive from ancient Assyrian-Akkadian. Fricatives (θ/ð), guttural sounds (ħ and ʕ), and distinctive word-final vowels are among the retained archaic features. In his 1873 work Studien über indogermanisch-semitische Wurzelverwandtschaft, Friedrich Delitzsch characterized Assyrian as the most "pure" of the Semitic languages.

From 1700 BC and onward, the Sumerian language was preserved by the ancient Babylonians and Assyrians only as a liturgical and classical language for religious, artistic, and scholarly purposes. The Akkadian language, whose main dialects, Assyrian and Babylonian, had served as the lingua franca of the Ancient Near East, became the dominant language of administration, literature, and diplomacy.

Following their conquest by the Assyrians, numerous populations, including the Arameans, were forcibly relocated to the Assyrian heartland and other territories within the empire. The substantial presence of Aramaic-speaking communities facilitated the gradual Aramaization of Assyrian society, with Aramean scribes collaborating alongside Assyrian counterparts in administrative and literary activities.

In classical antiquity, particularly under Tiglath-Pileser III, Akkadian was increasingly marginalized by Old Aramaic, which became the language of commerce, trade, administration, and vernacular use. Around a century after its initial adoption, the Aramaic script began replacing cuneiform for administrative and diplomatic purposes, although cuneiform continued to be used for royal and religious texts. By the Hellenistic period, Akkadian was largely confined to scholars and priests working in temples, and by the 1st century AD it had become extinct, although its influence on contemporary Eastern Neo-Aramaic languages spoken by Assyrians is significant, and some loaned vocabulary still survives in these languages to this day.

Many loanwords from the aforementioned languages exist in the Neo-Aramaic languages, with the Iranian languages and Turkish being the greatest influences overall. The Kültepe texts, which were written in Old Assyrian, preserve some loanwords from the Hittite language. These are the earliest attestations of any Indo-European language, dated to the 20th century BC. Most of the archaeological evidence is typical of Anatolia rather than of Assyria, but using both cuneiform and the dialect is the best indication of Assyrian presence. Over 20,000 cuneiform tablets have been recovered from the site.

=== Early Christian period ===
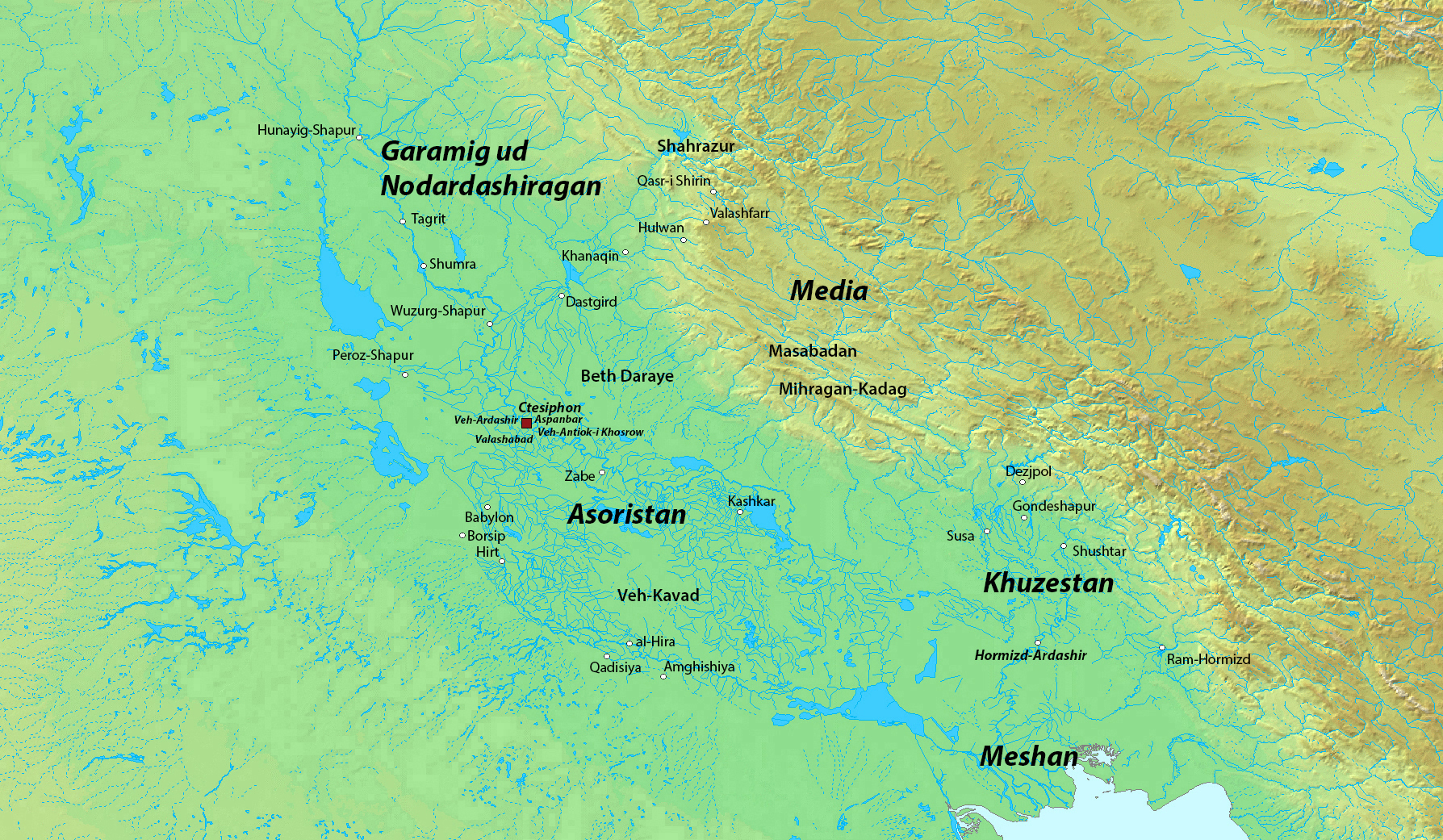
A map of Asōristān (226–637 AD)

From the 1st century BC, Assyria was the theatre of the protracted Roman–Persian Wars. Much of the region would become the Roman province of Assyria from 116 AD to 118 AD following the conquests of Trajan. Still, after a Parthian-inspired Assyrian rebellion, the new emperor Hadrian withdrew from the short-lived province Assyria and its neighboring provinces in 118 AD. Following a successful campaign in 197–198, Severus converted the kingdom of Osroene, centred on Edessa, into a frontier Roman province.

Osroëne and Adiabene were ancient kingdoms in northern Mesopotamia that played significant roles in the cultural and political landscape of the Near East from the Hellenistic period through late antiquity. Osroëne, centred around Edessa, was founded around 136 BC by Osroes, likely of Iranian origin, and controlled key trade routes while balancing alliances between Rome and Parthia. Edessa emerged as a cultural centre where the Syriac language and Christianity flourished, and the kingdom retained some autonomy under Roman protection until its incorporation into the empire in 216 AD. Adiabene was a small Parthian vassal kingdom centred at Arbela. In the 1st century AD, its royal family converted to Judaism; Queen Helena and her sons were buried in Jerusalem. Adiabene was frequently attacked by Roman forces during their campaigns against Parthia. Both kingdoms are recognised as key centres of Assyrian heritage. Although Osroëne was ethnically mixed, with an Arab ruling dynasty, Greek urban culture, and an Aramean majority, it is considered part of the historical and cultural identity of Assyrians. Adiabene, by contrast, was an Assyrian successor state: the temple of Ashur was restored, the city rebuilt, and an Assyrian identity persisted even under Parthian rule.

Roman influence in the region ended under Jovian in 363, who ceded it following a hasty peace with the Sassanians. The Assyrians were Christianised between the first and third centuries in Roman Syria and Roman Assyria. The Sasanian province of Asoristan had a mixed population of Assyrians, Arameans, and Persians; the Greek urban element, still prominent under the Parthians, ceased to be ethnically distinct in Sasanian times. Most inhabitants were Eastern Aramaic speakers, and much of the population was Christian, though Isho'Yahb III suggests pagans may have outnumbered Christians in some areas, worshipping gods such as Tammuz, a Babylonian sea monster, and idols. Together with the Arameans, Armenians, Greeks, and Nabataeans, the Assyrians were among the earliest peoples to adopt Christianity and spread Eastern Christianity to the Far East.

Within Sasanian Adiabene an examination of Syriac source work can infer that the majority of the population of Adiabene were Syriac speaking and of local Assyrian origin. At the same time, Adiabene's elites were integrated with values of Zoroastrian social life. It can be assumed that many local Semitic cults succumbed to state supported Zoroastrianism during this period. These trends can be seen in the Legend of Mar Qardagh, where the main protagonist is portrayed as being of Assyrian royal descent, yet of Zoroastrian creed prior to his conversion to Christianity.

During the reign of Yazdegerd I, Christians in Persia were viewed with suspicion as potential Roman subversives, resulting in persecution while at the same time promoting Nestorian Christianity as a buffer between the Churches of Rome and Persia. Persecutions and attempts to impose Zoroastrianism continued during the reign of Yazdegerd II.

In 410, the Council of Seleucia-Ctesiphon, the capital of the Sasanian Empire, organised the Christians within that Empire into what became known as the Church of the East. Its head was declared to be the bishop of Seleucia-Ctesiphon, who in the acts of the council was referred to as the Grand or Major Metropolitan and who soon afterward was called the Catholicos of the East. Later, the title of Patriarch was also used. Dioceses were organised into provinces, each of which was under the authority of a metropolitan bishop. Six such areas were instituted in 410.

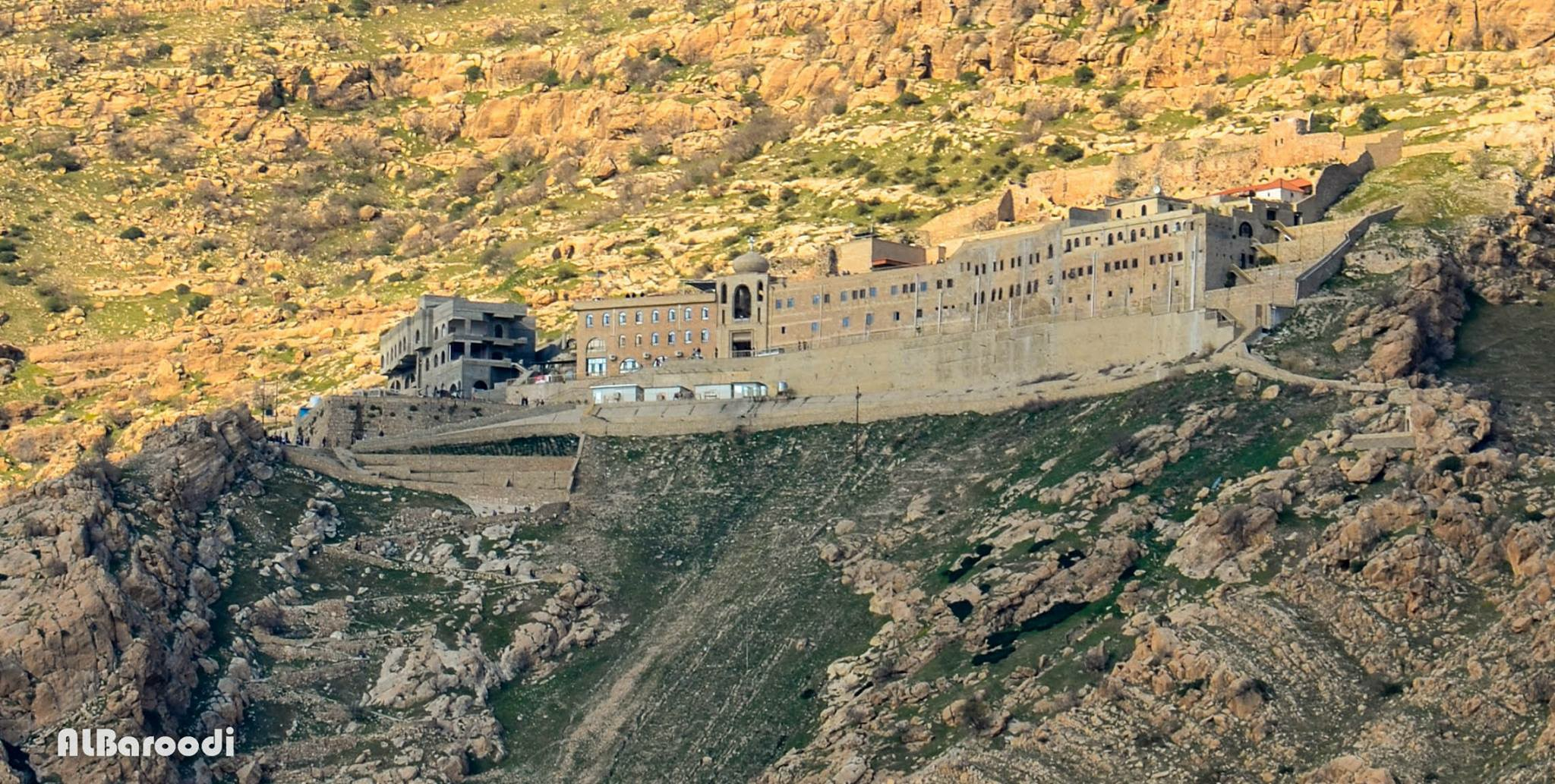
Mor Mattai Monastery (Dayro d-Mor Mattai) in, Bartella, Nineveh, Iraq. It is recognized as one of the oldest Christian monasteries in existence. It is famous for its magnificent library and a considerable collection of Syriac Christian manuscripts

Another council held in 424 declared that the Catholicos of the East was independent of "Western" ecclesiastical authorities (those of the Roman Empire).

Soon afterward, Christians in the Roman Empire were divided by their attitude regarding the Council of Ephesus (431), which condemned Nestorianism, and the Council of Chalcedon (451), which condemned Monophysitism. Those who for any reason refused to accept one or other of these councils were called Nestorians or Monophysites, while those who accepted both councils, held under the auspices of the Roman emperors, were called Melkites (derived from Syriac malkā, king), meaning royalists.

All three groups existed among the Syriac Christians, the East Syriacs being called Nestorians and the West Syriacs being divided between the Monophysites (today the Syriac Orthodox Church, also known as Jacobites, after Jacob Baradaeus) and those who accepted both councils, primarily today's Eastern Orthodox Church, which has adopted the Byzantine Rite in Greek, but also the Maronite Church, which kept its West Syriac Rite and was not as closely aligned with Constantinople.

Roman/Byzantine and Persian spheres of influence divided Syriac-speaking Christians into two groups: those who adhered to the Miaphysite Syriac Orthodox Church (the so-called Jacobite Church), or West Syrians, and those who adhered to the Church of the East, the so-called Nestorian Church. Following the split, they developed distinct dialects, mainly based on the pronunciation and written symbolization of vowels. With the rise of Syriac Christianity, eastern Aramaic enjoyed a renaissance as a classical language in the 2nd to 8th centuries, and varieties of that form of Aramaic (Neo-Aramaic languages) are still spoken by a few small groups of Jacobite and Nestorian Christians in the Middle East.

Theodora, who lived from April 1, 527 A.D. to June 28, 548 A.D., was a notable empress of the Byzantine Empire and the wife of Emperor Justinian I. Although her exact ethnic background is not definitively established, some sources suggest she was of Assyrian origin. She played a significant role in advocating for women's rights and social reforms. Theodora is particularly remembered for her efforts to improve the status of women, including legislation against forced prostitution and support for widows and orphans. She was a key supporter of her husband's efforts to restore and expand the Byzantine Empire from their capital, Constantinople. Additionally, Theodora worked towards alleviating the persecution of Miaphysites, although full reconciliation with this Christian sect was not achieved during her lifetime.

=== Arab conquest ===
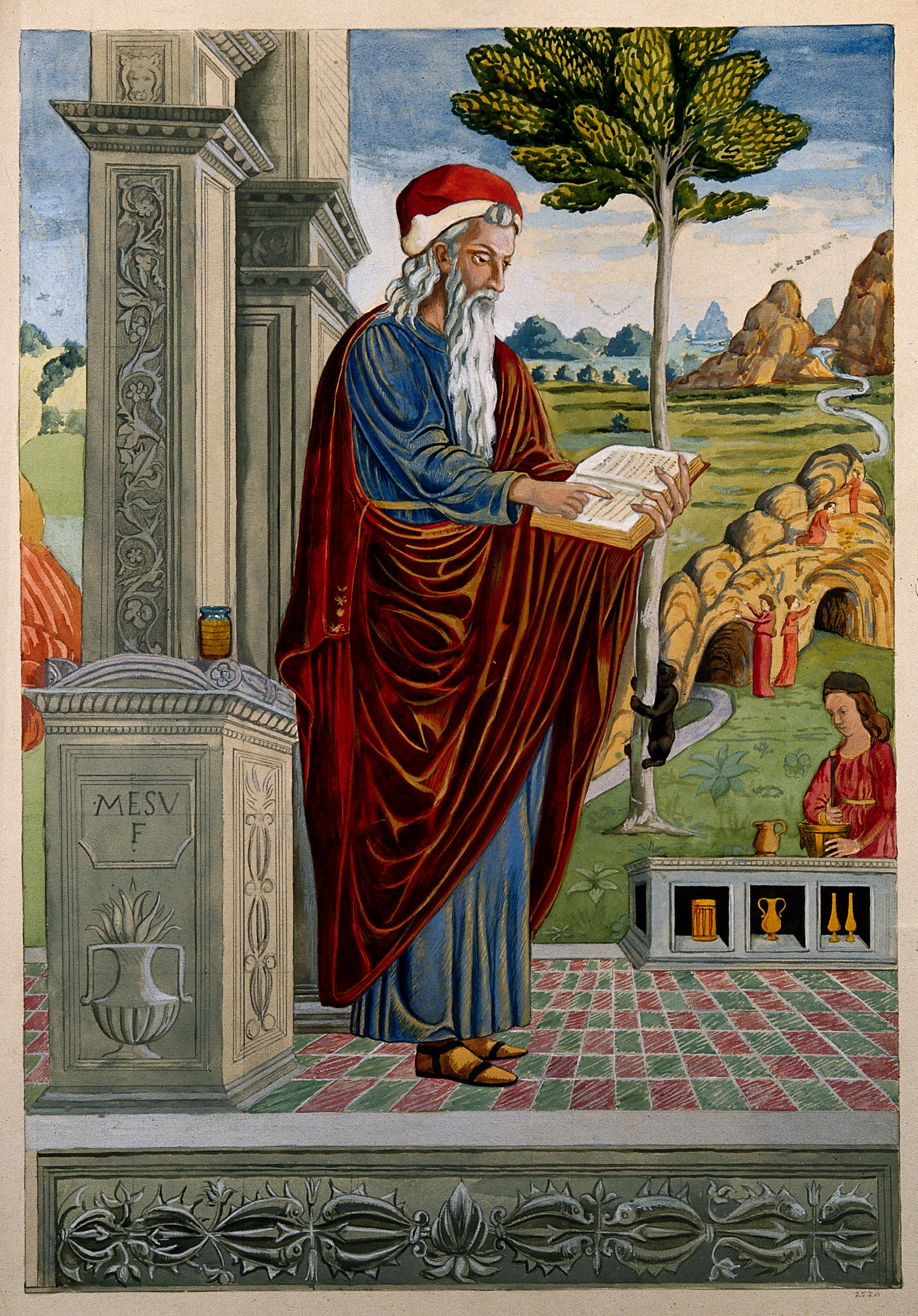
Masawaiyh, an Assyrian East Syriac physician of the Islamic Golden Age

The Assyrians initially experienced periods of religious and cultural freedom interspersed with periods of severe religious and ethnic persecution after the 7th century Muslim conquest of Persia. Assyrians contributed to Islamic civilizations during the Umayyad and Abbasid Caliphates by translating works of Greek philosophers to Syriac and afterward to Arabic. They also excelled in philosophy, science (Masawaiyh, Eutychius of Alexandria, and Jabril ibn Bukhtishu) and theology (such as Tatian, Bardaisan, Babai the Great, Nestorius, and Thomas of Marga) and the personal physicians of the Abbasid Caliphs were often Assyrians, such as the long-serving Bukhtishu dynasty. Many scholars of the House of Wisdom were of Assyrian Christian background.

Indigenous Assyrians became second-class citizens (dhimmi) in a greater Arab Islamic state. Those who resisted Arabization and conversion to Islam were subject to severe religious, ethnic, and cultural discrimination and had certain restrictions imposed upon them. Assyrians were excluded from specific duties and occupations reserved for Muslims. They did not enjoy the same political rights as Muslims, and their word was not equal to that of a Muslim in legal and civil matters. As Christians, they were subject to payment of a special tax, the jizya.

They were banned from spreading their religion further or building new churches in Muslim-ruled lands, but were expected to adhere to the same laws of property, contract, and obligation as the Muslim Arabs. They could not seek the conversion of a Muslim, a non-Muslim man could not marry a Muslim woman, and the child of such a marriage would be considered a Muslim. They could not own an enslaved Muslim and had to wear different clothing from Muslims to be distinguishable. In addition to the jizya tax, they were required to pay the kharaj tax on their land, which was heavier than the jizya. However, they were protected, given religious freedom, and to govern themselves according to their own laws.

As non-Islamic proselytising was punishable by death under Sharia, the Assyrians were forced into preaching in Transoxiana, Central Asia, India, Mongolia and China where they established numerous churches. The Church of the East was considered to be one of the major Christian powerhouses in the world, alongside Latin Christianity in Europe and the Byzantine Empire (Greek Orthodoxy).

From the 7th century AD onwards, Mesopotamia saw a steady influx of Arabs, Kurds and other Iranian peoples, and later Turkic peoples. Assyrians were increasingly marginalized, persecuted and gradually became a minority in their homeland. Conversion to Islam was a result of heavy taxation, which also resulted in decreased revenue from their rulers. As a result, the new converts migrated to Muslim garrison towns nearby.

Despite the influx of other peoples into the region, under the leadership of Mar Timothy I (780–823), the Church of the East reached a high point and Christians presumably constituted 40 percent of Mesopotamia's population. During the early Islamic period, the majority of the population of countries under Arab Islamic rule remained Christian. Prior to 850 AD, Muslims only made up 20 percent of the population of the Abbasid Caliphate, shifting to a majority after 950 AD. The rise of a solid Muslim majority in Syria and Mesopotamia can be dated to the late 10th or 11th centuries. Large Christian minorities persisted into the 13th century, which saw a decisive move toward Muslim hegemony.

Assyrians remained dominant in Upper Mesopotamia as late as the 14th century, with Syriac being the primary language centuries after the Arab invasions. and the city of Assur was still occupied by Assyrians during the Islamic period until the mid-14th century when the Muslim Turco-Mongol ruler Timur conducted a religiously motivated massacre against Assyrians. After, no records of Assyrians remained in Assur according to the archaeological and numismatic record. From this point, the Assyrian population was dramatically reduced in their homeland.

=== Turco-Mongol rule ===
A map of the Aramaic language and Syriac Christianity in the Middle East and Central Asia until being largely annihilated by Tamerlane in the 14th century

After initially falling under the control of the Seljuks and the Buyid dynasty, the region was conquered by the Mongol Empire after the fall of Baghdad in 1258; the Mongol khans were said to be more sympathetic with Christians. The will of Saliba (d. 1264), a Syriac Christian merchant and burgess of Acre, details extensive interactions with the Latin (Frankish) population in Crusader cities, including family networks, commercial activity, philanthropy, and religious engagement.

According to some Arab historians, Assyrians persisted in the regions of Hakkari and Assyria (Mosul), though during the Seljuk and subsequent Timurid invasions of Assyrian regions, Kurds joined Turco-Mongol forces in advancing on Mesopotamian cities such as Diyarbakir, Mosul and Baghdad. Population destruction transpired in the region such as the attacks led by Timur in the late 1300s.

The 14th century massacres of Timur devastated the Assyrian people. The religiously motivated massacres and pillaging led to tens of thousands of Assyrians slaughtered across northwestern, central, and northern Iran. At the end of the reign of Timur, the Assyrian population had almost been eradicated in many places. Toward the end of the thirteenth century, Bar Hebraeus, the noted Assyrian scholar and hierarch, found "much quietness" in his diocese in Mesopotamia. Syria's diocese, he wrote, was "wasted." The region subsequently fell under the Iran-based Turkic confederations of the Aq Qoyunlu and Kara Koyunlu, before being incorporated into the Safavid Empire in 1501, along with the rest of the former Aq Qoyunlu territories.

=== Safavid to Ottoman rule ===
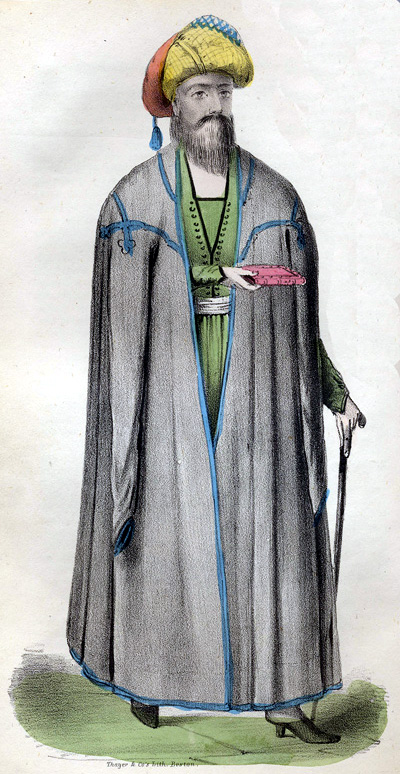
Mar Elias (Eliya), the East Syriac bishop of the Urmia plain village of Geogtapa, c. 1831

The Ottomans secured their control over Mesopotamia and Syria in the first half of the 17th century following the Ottoman–Safavid War (1623–39) and the resulting Treaty of Zuhab. Non-Muslims were organised into millets. Syriac Christians, however, were often considered one millet alongside Armenians until the 19th century, when the orthodox East Syriac, Syriac Orthodox and Chaldeans gained that right as well.

The Aramaic-speaking Mesopotamian Christians had long been divided between followers of the Church of the East, commonly referred to as "Nestorians", and followers of the Syriac Orthodox Church, commonly called Jacobites. The latter were organised by Marutha of Tikrit (565–649) as 17 dioceses under a "Metropolitan of the East" or "Maphrian", holding the highest rank in the Syriac Orthodox Church after that of the Syriac Orthodox Patriarch of Antioch and All the East. The Maphrian resided at Tikrit until 1089, when he moved to the city of Mosul for half a century, before settling in the nearby Monastery of Mar Mattai (still belonging to the Syriac Orthodox Church) and thus not far from the residence of the Eliya line of Patriarchs of the Church of the East. From 1533, the holder of the office was known as the Maphrian of Mosul, to distinguish him from the Maphrian of the Patriarch of Tur Abdin.

In 1552, a group of bishops of the Church of the East from the northern regions of Amid and Salmas, who were dissatisfied with reservation of patriarchal succession to members of a single family, even if the designated successor was little more than a child, elected as a rival patriarch the abbot of the Rabban Hormizd Monastery, Yohannan Sulaqa. This was by no means the first schism in the Church of the East. An example is the attempt to replace Timothy I (779–823) with Ephrem of Gandīsābur.

By tradition, a patriarch could be ordained only by someone of archiepiscopal (metropolitan) rank, a rank to which only members of that one family were promoted. For that reason, Sulaqa travelled to Rome, where, presented as the new Patriarch elect, he entered communion with the Catholic Church and was ordained by the Pope and recognized as Patriarch. The title or description under which he was recognized as Patriarch is given variously as "Patriarch of Mosul in Eastern Syria"; "Patriarch of the Church of the Chaldeans of Mosul"; "Patriarch of the Chaldeans"; "Patriarch of Mosul"; or "Patriarch of the Eastern Assyrians", this last being the version given by Pietro Strozzi on the second-last unnumbered page before page 1 of his De Dogmatibus Chaldaeorum, of which an English translation is given in Adrian Fortescue's Lesser Eastern Churches.

Mar Shimun VIII Yohannan Sulaqa returned to northern Mesopotamia in the same year and fixed his seat in Amid. Before being imprisoned for four months and then in January 1555 put to death by the governor of Amadiya at the instigation of the rival Patriarch of Alqosh, of the Eliya line, he ordained two metropolitans and three other bishops, thus beginning a new ecclesiastical hierarchy: the patriarchal line known as the Shimun line. The area of influence of this patriarchate soon moved from Amid east, fixing the see, after many changes, in the isolated village of Qochanis.

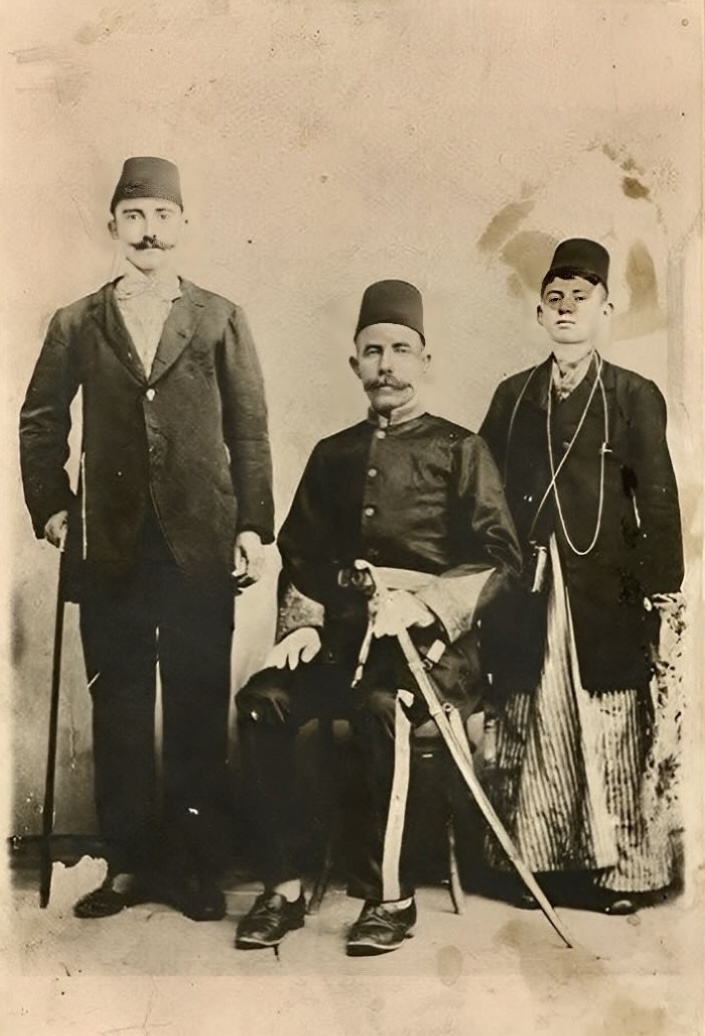
Hanne Safar (center)

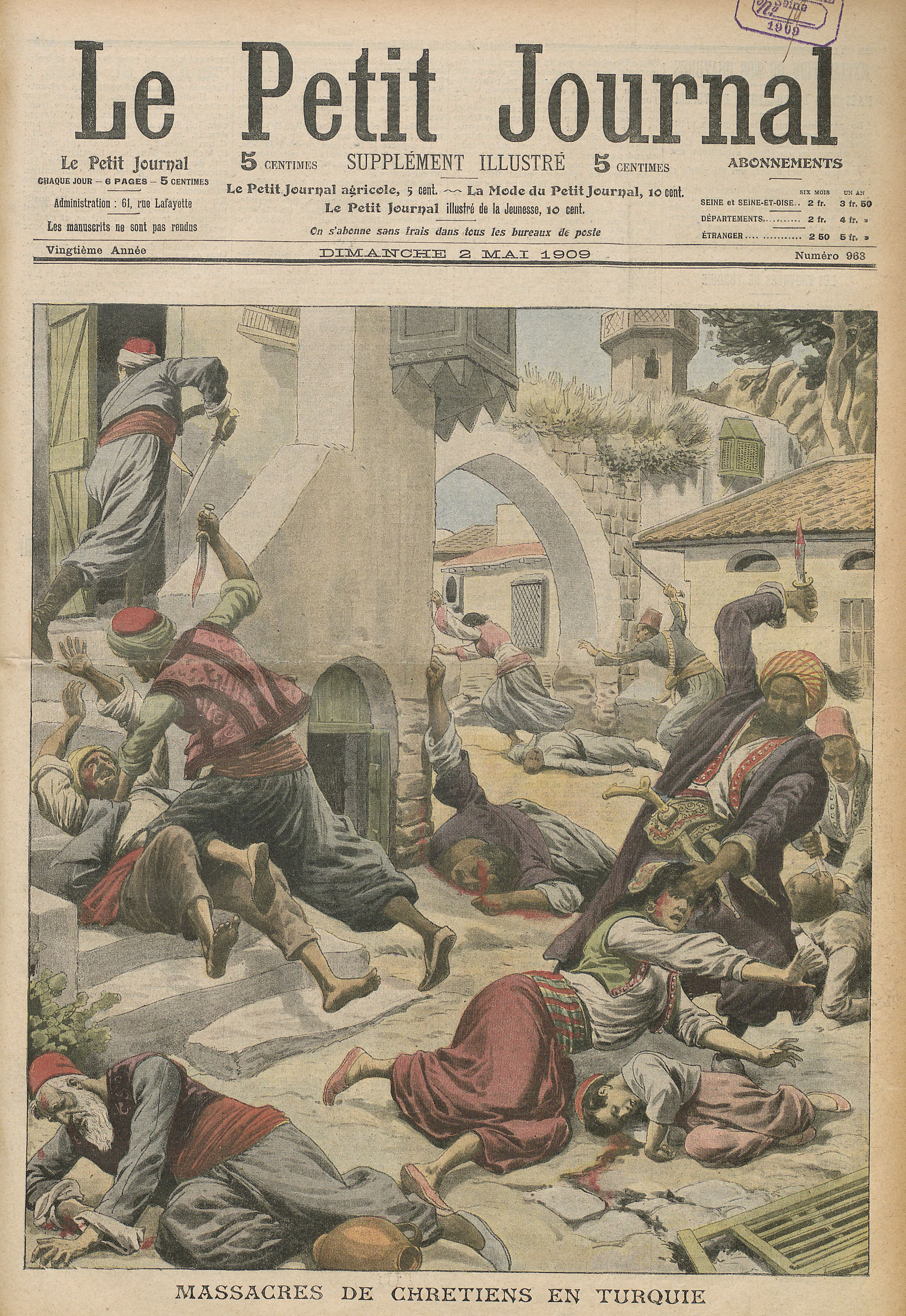
A massacre of Armenians and Assyrians in the city of Adana, Ottoman Empire, April 1909

The Shimun line eventually drifted away from Rome and in 1662 adopted a profession of faith incompatible with that of Rome. Leadership of those who wished communion with Rome passed to the Archbishop of Amid Joseph I, recognized first by the Turkish civil authorities (1677) and then by Rome itself (1681). A century and a half later, in 1830, headship of the Catholics (the Chaldean Catholic Church) was conferred on Yohannan Hormizd, a member of the family that for centuries had provided the patriarchs of the legitimist "Eliya line", who had won over most of the followers of that line. Thus the patriarchal line of those who in 1553 entered communion with Rome are now patriarchs of the "traditionalist" wing of the Church of the East, that which in 1976 officially adopted the name "Assyrian Church of the East".

The 1840s–1850s were a volatile period of both intellectual growth and persecution. During the 19th century, Urmia region became the center of a short-lived Assyrian renaissance with many books and newspapers being published in Syriac. In Urmia, literacy rates were remarkably high for the time (80%), and the first Bible in the Syriac language was printed. British-Assyrian archaeologist Hormuzd Rassam discovered tablets that led to the recovery of the Epic of Gilgamesh, the oldest notable literature. After the rise of Balkan nationalism, the Ottomans viewed Assyrians and other Christians as a potential threat. The Kurdish Emirs sought to consolidate their power by attacking well-established communities, and many Assyrians in the Hakkari mountains were massacred. The events reached the Western press and became a turning point for European politicians regarding the plight of Christians. By 1846, international powers forced the Ottomans to intervene. The ensuing conflict destroyed the Kurdish emirates and reasserted Ottoman power in the area; the massacres of Diyarbakır followed.

The Patriarch of the Assyrian Church of the East, who resided at the Church of Mār Shalīṭa in Qudshanis, exercised both spiritual and temporal authority over his followers. Because bishops were required to remain celibate, the patriarchal office was transmitted from uncle to nephew. This system became known as Nāṭar Kursyā (ܢܛܪ ܟܘܪܣܝܐ, "Guardian of the Throne"), and by the 19th century it had been adopted in all the dioceses of Hakkari. The Assyrians maintained complex alliances with neighbouring Kurdish tribes and their Ottoman overlords. Each Assyrian tribe was headed by a Malik (ܡܠܟ), who also served as its military commander in times of war. The Tyari Assyrians inhabited 51 villages and numbered approximately 50,000 people, making them the most powerful of the semi-independent Assyrian tribes.

During the Second Bedirkhanis Revolt, A Kurdish Revolt which erupted during the Russo-Turkish War (1877–1878), the Assyrians, under the leadership of Hanne Safar, supported the Ottoman Empire. Hanne Safar played a significant role in organizing Assyrian assistance to the Ottoman army throughout the Revolt. For his service and loyalty, he was later granted the title of Pasha and was presented with a sword blessed by the Sultan himself.

Another major massacre of Assyrians (and Armenians) in the Ottoman Empire occurred between 1894 and 1897 by Turkish troops and their Kurdish allies during the rule of Sultan Abdul Hamid II. The motives for these massacres were an attempt to reassert Pan-Islamism in the Ottoman Empire, resentment at the comparative wealth of the ancient indigenous Christian communities, and a fear that they would attempt to secede from the tottering Ottoman Empire. Assyrians were massacred in Diyarbakir, Hasankeyef, Sivas and other parts of Anatolia, by Sultan Abdul Hamid II. These attacks caused the death of over thousands of Assyrians and the forced "Ottomanisation" of the inhabitants of 245 villages. The Turkish troops looted the remains of the Assyrian settlements and these were later stolen and occupied by Kurds. Unarmed Assyrian women and children were raped, tortured and murdered.

=== United States ===
Following the outcome of the U.S Civil War, the American Board of Commissioners for Foreign Missions transferred control of its Persian stations to the Presbyterian Board of Foreign Missions, and thousands of Assyrians who had been educated by these American missions moved to Chicago, Illinois. Aided by their Fourth Presbyterian Church, these Assyrians organized local Bible studies that founded the Carter Memorial Persian Assyrian Presbyterian Church. The Chicago settlement faced agricultural limitations, and around 1905, settlers from Urmia, led by Rev. Isaac Adams, helped establish a farming community in and around Turlock, California. By 1930, Turlock's Assyrian population was 20%; they were such a significant part of the population that the southern part of town became known as "Little Urmia." That same decade, the city was cited by Ripley's Believe It or Not as having the most churches per capita in the US, partly due to the variety of ethnic churches serving the relatively small settler population.

Assyrian American National Federation (AANF) was initiated in West New York, New Jersey on October 19, 1933, and its constitution was formally adopted in New Britain, Connecticut a month later. Published by the AANF since January 1952 and founded by Joseph P. Durna, The Assyrian Star is the US's longest-running bilingual (English and Assyrian) magazine. They commenced the annual 5-day Labor Day weekend Assyrian Convention in 1933, rotating across major U.S. cities like Chicago, Las Vegas, San Diego, Detroit, and Phoenix.

In 2021, President Biden formally recognized the genocide perpetrated by the Ottomans against the Armenians, Assyrians, and Greeks, fulfilling a step that the Obama administration had campaigned on in 2008 but ultimately declined to do upon election. During the 2024 presidential election, both Donald Trump and Kamala Harris sought to engage the Assyrian electorate in swing states. Harris held discussions with members and leaders in the community, while following his electoral victory, Trump appointed an Assyrian to serve as his counselor.

Americans of Assyrian descent maintain a degree of cultural autonomy and recognition, notably through the naming of Chaldean Town in Wayne County, Michigan. The city of Turlock hosts an annual Assyrian Festival at the Stanislaus County Fair featuring traditional food, music, and dance. Active lobbies in the U.S. include: Assyrian American Political Advocacy Committee (AAPAC), Assyrian American National Federation (AANF), Assyrian American National Coalition (AANC), Assyrian Policy Institute.

=== World War I ===
Assyrian flag, c. 1920

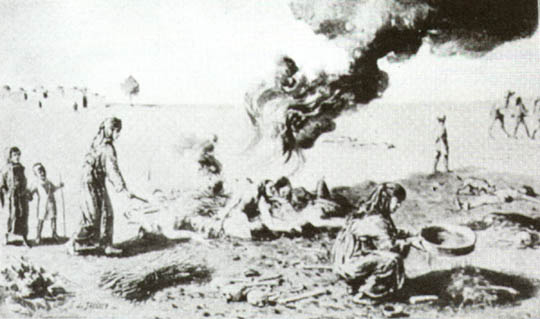
The burning of bodies of Assyrian women

The Assyrians suffered a number of religiously and ethnically motivated massacres throughout the 17th, 18th and 19th centuries, culminating in the large-scale Hamidian massacres of unarmed men, women and children by Muslim Turks and Kurds in the late 19th century at the hands of the Ottoman Empire and its associated (largely Kurdish and Arab) militias, which further greatly reduced numbers, particularly in southeastern Turkey.

The most significant recent persecution against the Assyrian population was the Assyrian genocide which occurred during the First World War. Between 250,000 and 275,000 Anatolian Assyrians were estimated to have been slaughtered by the armies of the Ottoman Empire and their Kurdish allies between 1895 and 1919, totalling up to two-thirds of the entire Assyrian population of Turkey. This triggered large-scale emigration of Turkish-Assyrians into neighboring regions in the Middle East (where they faced further violence from Arab and Kurdish groups) and the Caucasus.

During World War I, the Assyrians suffered heavy losses due to deportations and mass killings organized by the Ottoman Turks. Several representatives of the Assyrian people participated in the Paris Peace Conference of 1919, after the war had ended. These representatives aimed to establish an independent nation and sought to persuade the victorious powers to place it under a single mandatory authority. Although many sympathized with the Assyrians, none of their demands were implemented. Their efforts failed due to geographical and denominational divisions among themselves, as well as the fact that the major powers—Britain and France—had their own plans for the territories where the Assyrians lived.

==== Resistance ====
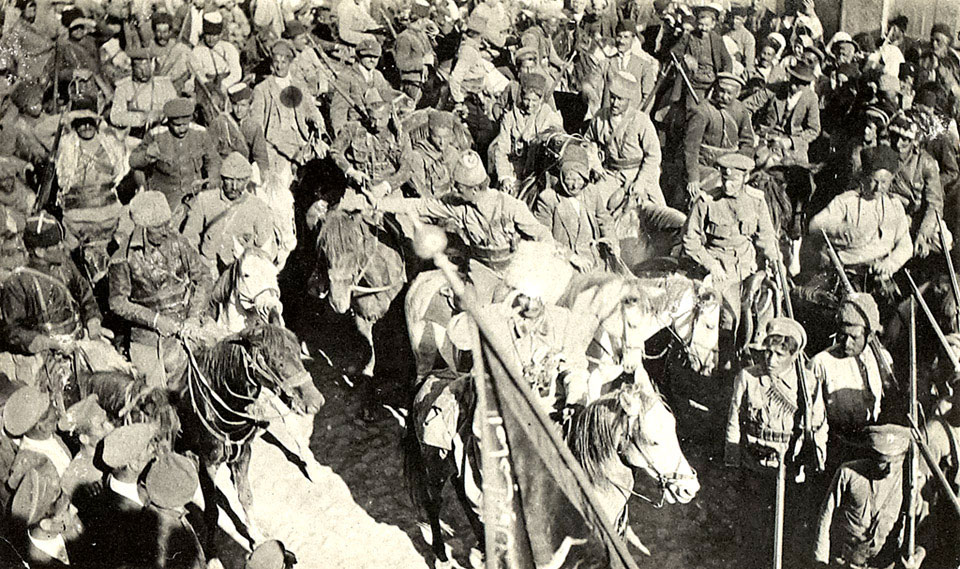
Assyrian troops led by Agha Petros (saluting) with a captured Turkish banner in the foreground, 1918

In reaction to the Assyrian genocide and lured by British and Russian promises of an independent nation, the Assyrians led by Agha Petros and Malik Khoshaba of the Bit-Tyari tribe, fought alongside the Allies against Ottoman forces known as the Assyrian volunteers or Our Smallest Ally. Despite being heavily outnumbered and outgunned the Assyrians fought successfully, scoring a number of victories over the Ottoman forces and its allies. This situation continued until their Russian allies withdrew following the 1917 Revolution, and Armenian resistance broke, leaving the Assyrians surrounded, isolated and cut off from lines of supply. The sizable Assyrian presence in south eastern Anatolia which had endured for over four millennia was thus reduced significantly by the end of World War I.

Assyrians in Azakh and Iwardo held defenses against Ottoman and Kurdish soldiers and succeeded in fending off the attacks. Ottoman authorities labeled these defenses as part of the larger Midyat rebellion, which they used to justify the planned sieges against them. The Turks did not consider the Assyrians to have a nationalistic agenda and understood that they did not engage in terrorism, and it was known that their actions targeted populations that were not Armenian, as Assyrians had traditionally been divided by the millet system along religious lines. The defenses lasted for several months up to the end of 1915. For Assyrians who originate from Tur Abdin, the stories of the defenses remain integral to their identity and collective memory of Sayfo.

The Assyrian rebellion was an uprising by the Assyrians in Hakkari that began on 3 September 1924 and ended on 28 September. The Assyrians of Tyari and Tkhuma returned to their ancestral land in Hakkari in 1922, shortly after World War I without permission from the Turkish government. This led to clashes between the Assyrians and the Turkish army with their Kurdish allies that grew into a rebellion in 1924, it ended with the Assyrians being forced to retreat to Iraq.

=== Modern history ===
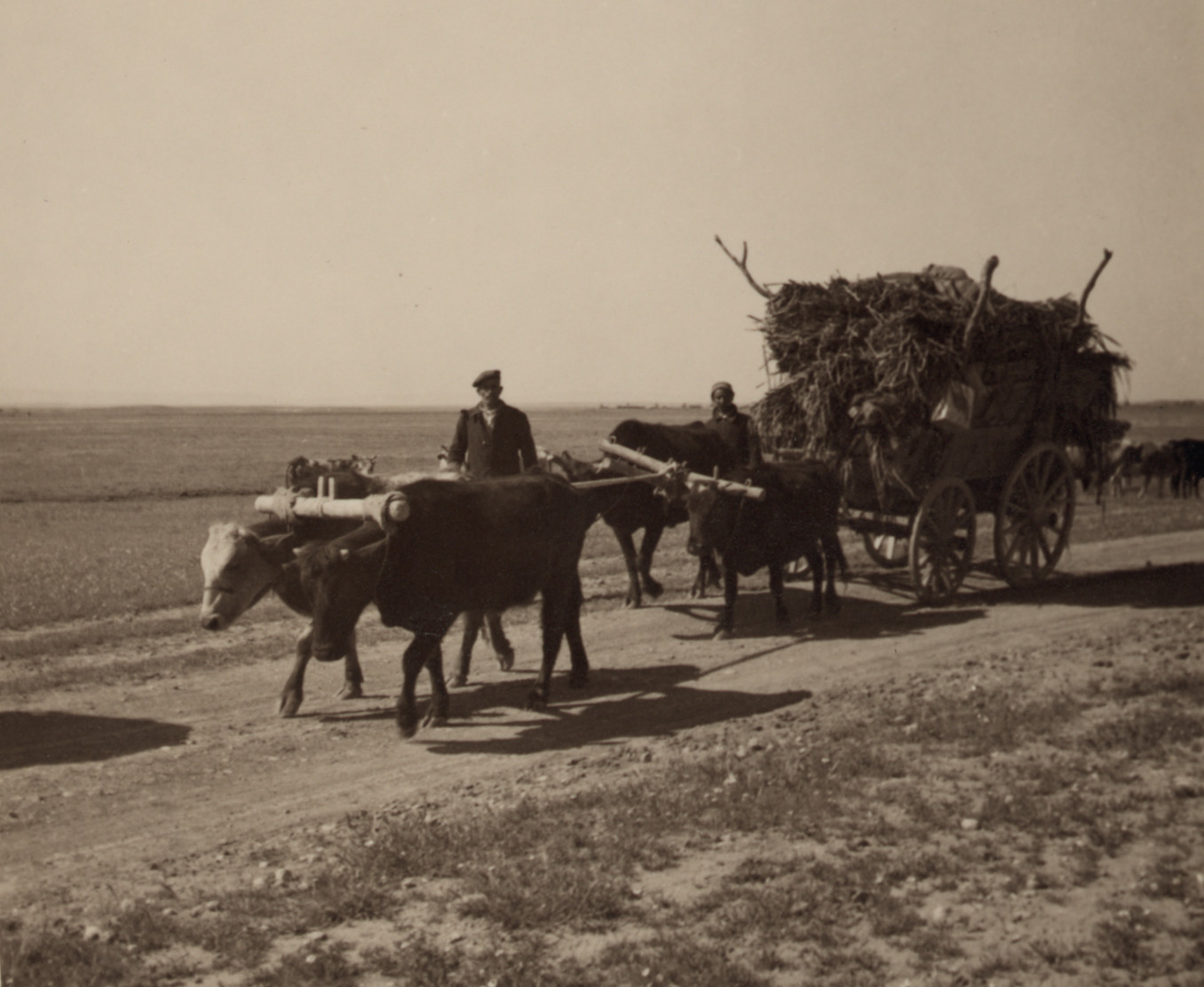
Assyrian refugees on a wagon moving to a newly constructed village on the Khabur River in Syria

The majority of Assyrians living in what is today modern Turkey were forced to flee to either Syria or Iraq after the Turkish victory during the Turkish War of Independence. In 1932, Assyrians refused to become part of the newly formed state of Iraq and instead demanded their recognition as a nation within a nation. The Assyrian leader Shimun XXI Eshai asked the League of Nations to recognize the right of the Assyrians to govern the area known as the "Assyrian triangle" in northern Iraq. During the French mandate period, some Assyrians, fleeing ethnic cleansings in Iraq during the Simele massacre, established numerous villages along the Khabur River during the 1930s.

The Assyrian Levies were founded by the British in 1928, with ancient Assyrian military rankings such as Rab-shakeh, Rab-talia and Tartan, being revived for the first time in millennia for this force. The Assyrians were prized by the British rulers for their fighting qualities, loyalty, bravery and discipline, and were used to help the British put down insurrections among the Arabs and Kurds. During World War II, eleven Assyrian companies saw action in Palestine and another four served in Cyprus. The Parachute Company was attached to the Royal Marine Commando and were involved in fighting in Albania, Italy and Greece. The Assyrian Levies played a major role in subduing the pro-Nazi Iraqi forces at the battle of Habbaniya in 1941.

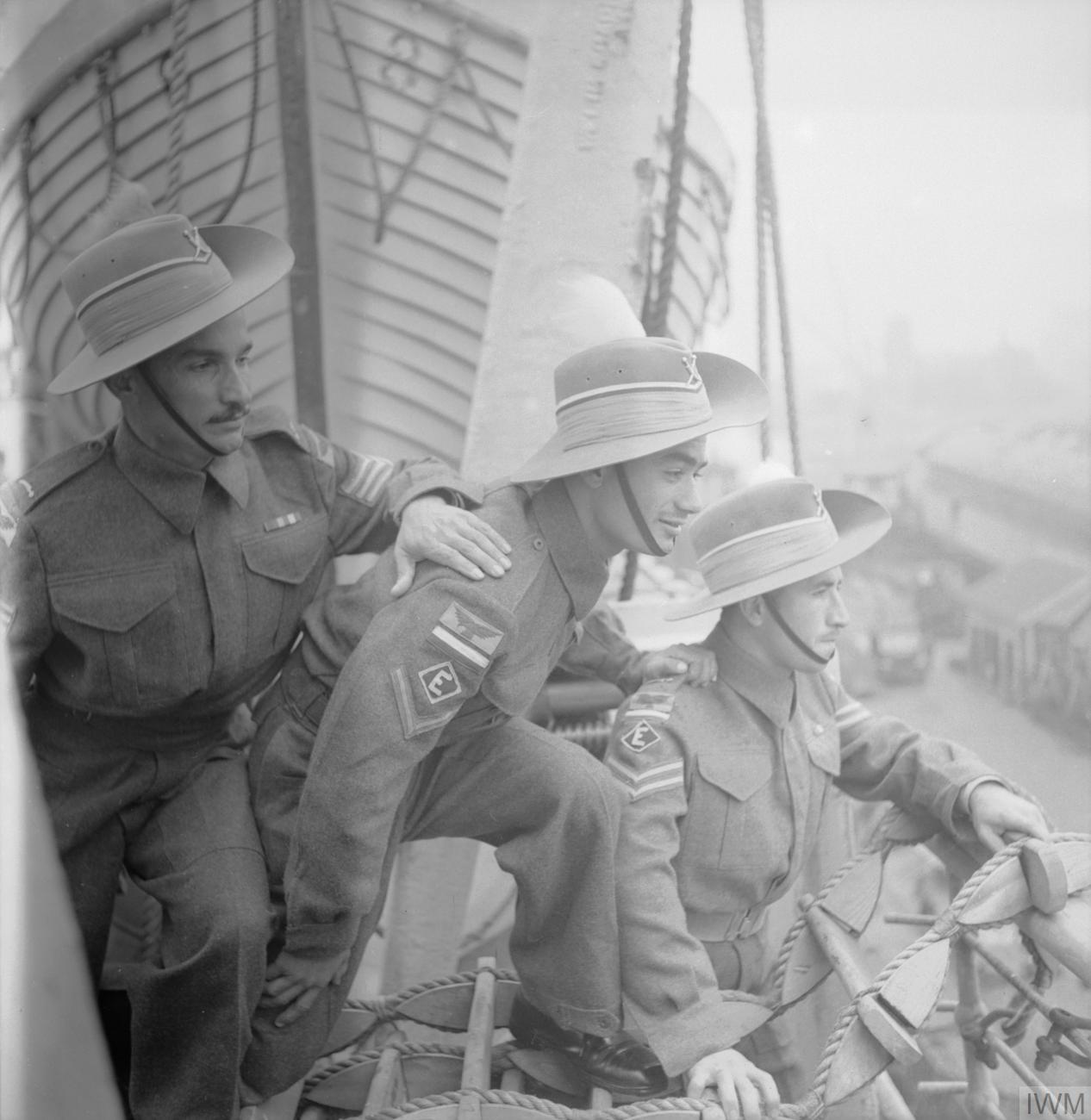
Three Assyrian Iraq Levies, who volunteered in 1946 for service as ground crew with the Royal Air Force, look over the side of the ORBITA as it pulls into the docks at Liverpool. Left to right, they are: Sergeant Macko Shmos, Lance Corporal Adoniyo Odisho and Corporal Yoseph Odisho.

However, this cooperation with the British was viewed with suspicion by some leaders of the newly formed Kingdom of Iraq. The tension reached its peak shortly after the formal declaration of independence when hundreds of Assyrian civilians were slaughtered during the Simele massacre by the Iraqi Army in August 1933. The events lead to the expulsion of Shimun XXI Eshai the Catholicos Patriarch of the Assyrian Church of the East to the United States where he resided until his death in 1975. The trauma of this event directly inspired legal scholar Raphael Lemkin to help coin the word and concept of "genocide".

The period from the 1940s through to 1963 saw a period of respite for the Assyrians. The regime of President Abd al-Karim Qasim in particular saw the Assyrians accepted into mainstream society. Many urban Assyrians became successful businessmen, others were well represented in politics and the military, their towns and villages flourished undisturbed, and Assyrians came to excel, and be over represented in sports.

The Ba'ath Party seized power in Iraq and Syria in 1963, introducing laws aimed at suppressing the Assyrian national identity via arabization policies. The giving of traditional Assyrian names was banned and Assyrian schools, political parties, churches and literature were repressed. Assyrians were heavily pressured into identifying as Iraqi Christians or Syrian Christians. Assyrians were not recognized as an ethnic group by the governments and they fostered divisions among Assyrians along religious lines (e.g. Assyrian Church of the East vs. Chaldean Catholic Church vs Syriac Orthodox Church).

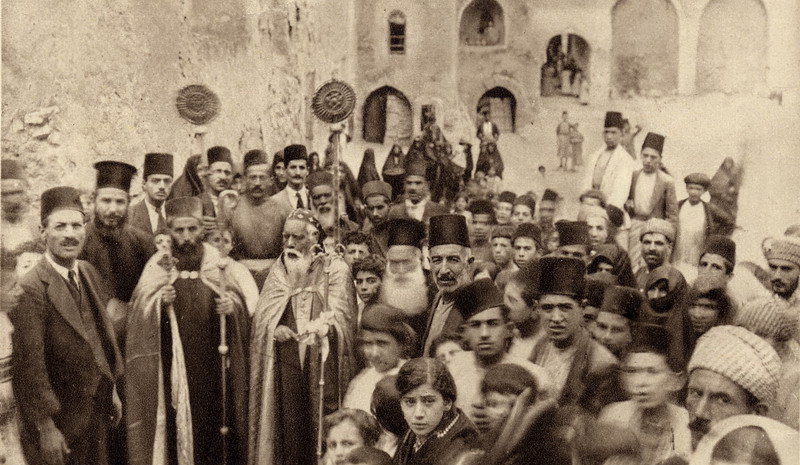
Celebration at a Syriac Orthodox monastery in Mosul, early 20th century

In response to Baathist persecution, the Assyrians of the Zowaa movement within the Assyrian Democratic Movement took up armed struggle against the Iraqi government in 1982 under the leadership of Yonadam Kanna, and then joined up with the Iraqi-Kurdistan Front in the early 1990s. Yonadam Kanna in particular was a target of the Saddam Hussein Ba'ath government for many years.

The Anfal campaign of 1986–1989 in Iraq, which was intended to target Kurdish opposition, resulted in 2,000 Assyrians being murdered through its gas campaigns. Over 31 towns and villages, 25 Assyrian monasteries and churches were razed to the ground. Some Assyrians were murdered, others were deported to large cities, and their lands and homes then being appropriated by Arabs and Kurds.

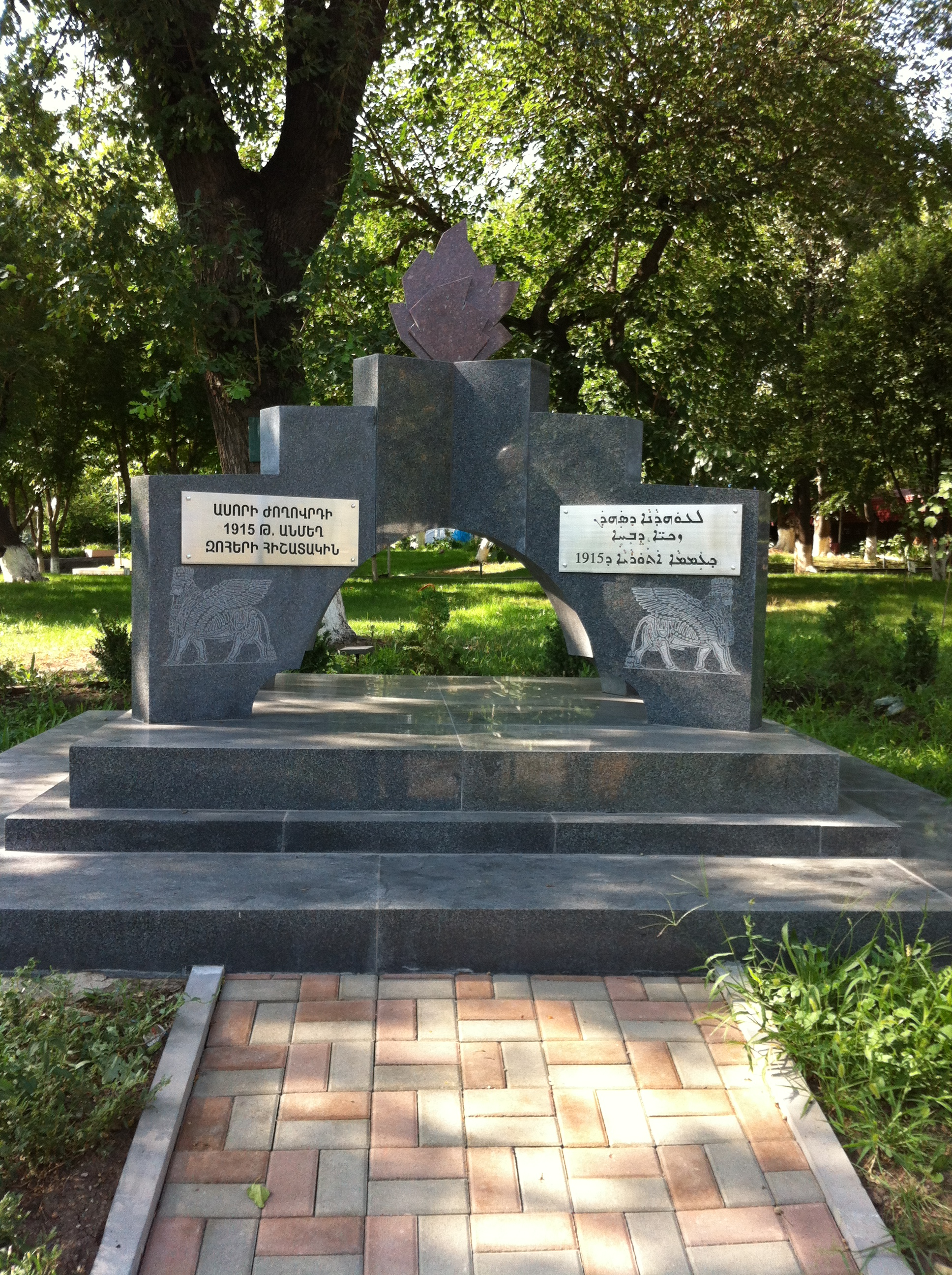
Assyrian genocide Memorial in Yerevan, Armenia

Social unrest and chaos resulted in the unprovoked persecution of Assyrians in Iraq mostly by Islamic extremists (both Shia and Sunni) and Kurdish nationalists (e.g., the 2008 anti-Christian campaign in Mosul, and the 2011 Dohuk riots aimed at Assyrians & Yazidis). In places such as Dora, a neighborhood in southwestern Baghdad, the majority of its Assyrian population has either fled abroad or to northern Iraq, or has been murdered. Islamic resentment over the United States' occupation of Iraq, and incidents such as the Jyllands-Posten Muhammad cartoons and the Pope Benedict XVI Islam controversy, have resulted in Muslims attacking Assyrian communities. Since the start of the Iraq war, at least 46 churches and monasteries have been bombed.

In recent years, the Assyrians in northern Iraq and northeast Syria have become the target of extreme unprovoked Islamic terrorism. As a result, Assyrians have taken up arms alongside other groups, such as the Kurds, Turcomans and Armenians, in response to unprovoked attacks by Al Qaeda, the Islamic State (ISIL), Nusra Front and other terrorist Islamic Fundamentalist groups. In 2014 Islamic terrorists of ISIL attacked Assyrian towns and villages in the Assyrian Homeland of northern Iraq, together with cities such as Mosul and Kirkuk which have large Assyrian populations. There have been reports of atrocities committed by ISIL terrorists since, including; beheadings, crucifixions, child murders, rape, forced conversions, ethnic cleansing, robbery, and extortion in the form of illegal taxes levied upon non-Muslims. Assyrians in Iraq have responded by forming armed militias to defend their territories.

The Islamic State was driven out from the Assyrian villages in the Khabour River Valley and the areas surrounding the city of Al-Hasakah in Syria by 2015, and from the Nineveh Plains in Iraq by 2017. In 2014, the Nineveh Plain Protection Units was formed and many Assyrians joined the force to defend themselves. The organization later became part of Iraqi Armed Forces and played a key role in liberating areas previously held by the Islamic State during the War in Iraq. In northern Syria, Assyrian groups have been taking part both politically and militarily in the Kurdish-dominated but multiethnic Syrian Democratic Forces (see Khabour Guards and Sutoro) and Autonomous Administration of North and East Syria. Dwekh Nawsha and the Nineveh Plain Forces were eventually disbanded.

In Syria, the Dawronoye modernization movement has influenced Assyrian identity in the region. The largest proponent of the movement, the Syriac Union Party (SUP) has become a major political actor in the Democratic Federation of Northern Syria. In August 2016, the Ourhi Centre in the city of Zalin was started by the Assyrian community, to educate teachers to make Syriac an optional language of instruction in public schools, which then started with the 2016/17 academic year. With that academic year, states the Rojava Education Committee, "three curriculums have replaced the old one, to include teaching in three languages: Kurdish, Arabic and Assyrian." Associated with the SUP is the Syriac Military Council, an Assyrian militia operating in Syria, established in January 2013 to protect and stand up for the national rights of Assyrians in Syria as well as working together with the other communities in Syria to change the current government of Bashar al-Assad. However, many Assyrians and the organizations that represent them, particularly those outside Syria, are critical of the Dawronoye movement.

A 2018 report stated that Kurdish authorities in Syria, in conjunction with Dawronoye officials, had shut down several Assyrian schools in Northern Syria and fired their administration. This was said to be because these schooled failed to register for a license and for rejecting the new curriculum approved by the Education Authority. Closure methods ranged from officially shutting down schools to having armed men enter the schools and shut them down forcefully. An Assyrian educator named Isa Rashid was later badly beaten outside his home for rejecting the Kurdish self-administration's curriculum. The Assyrian Policy Institute claimed that an Assyrian reporter named Souleman Yusph was arrested by Kurdish forces for his reports on the Dawronoye-related school closures in Syria. Specifically, he had shared numerous photographs on Facebook detailing the closures.

== Demographics ==
Maunsell's map, a Pre-World War I British Ethnographical Map of the Middle East showing "Chaldeans", "Jacobites", and "Nestorians"

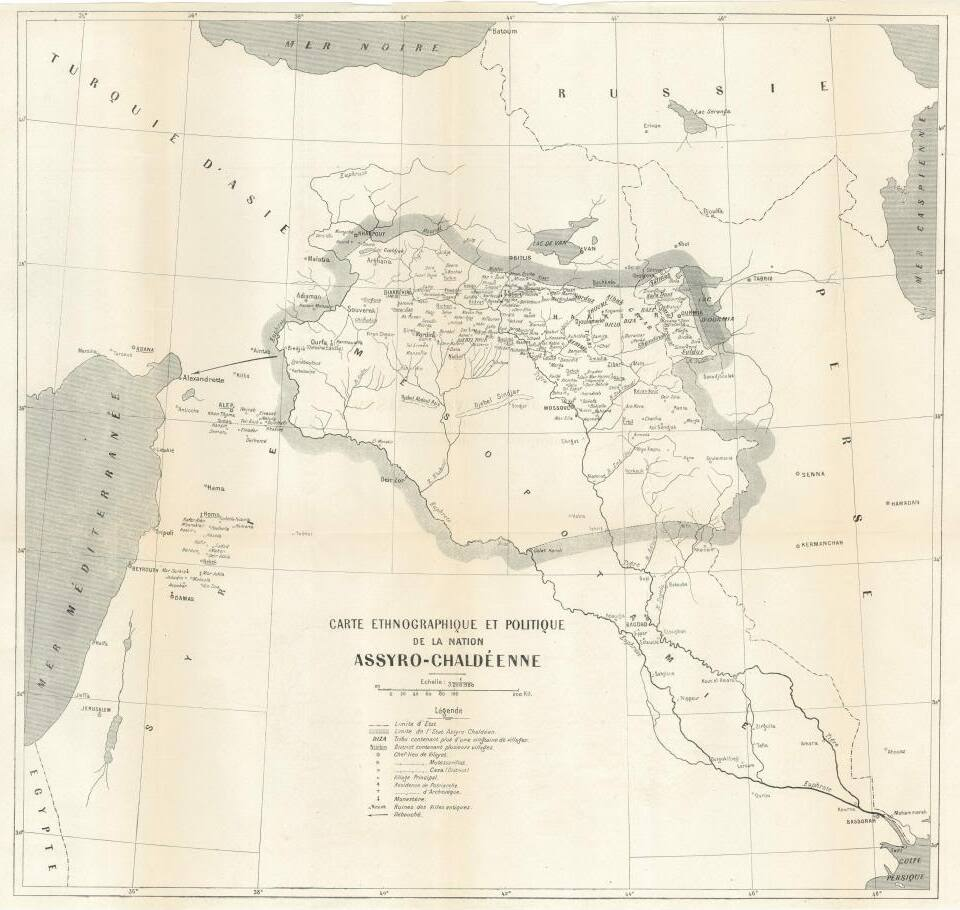
The Assyro-Chaldean Delegation's map of an independent Assyria, presented at the Paris Peace Conference 1919

=== Homeland ===
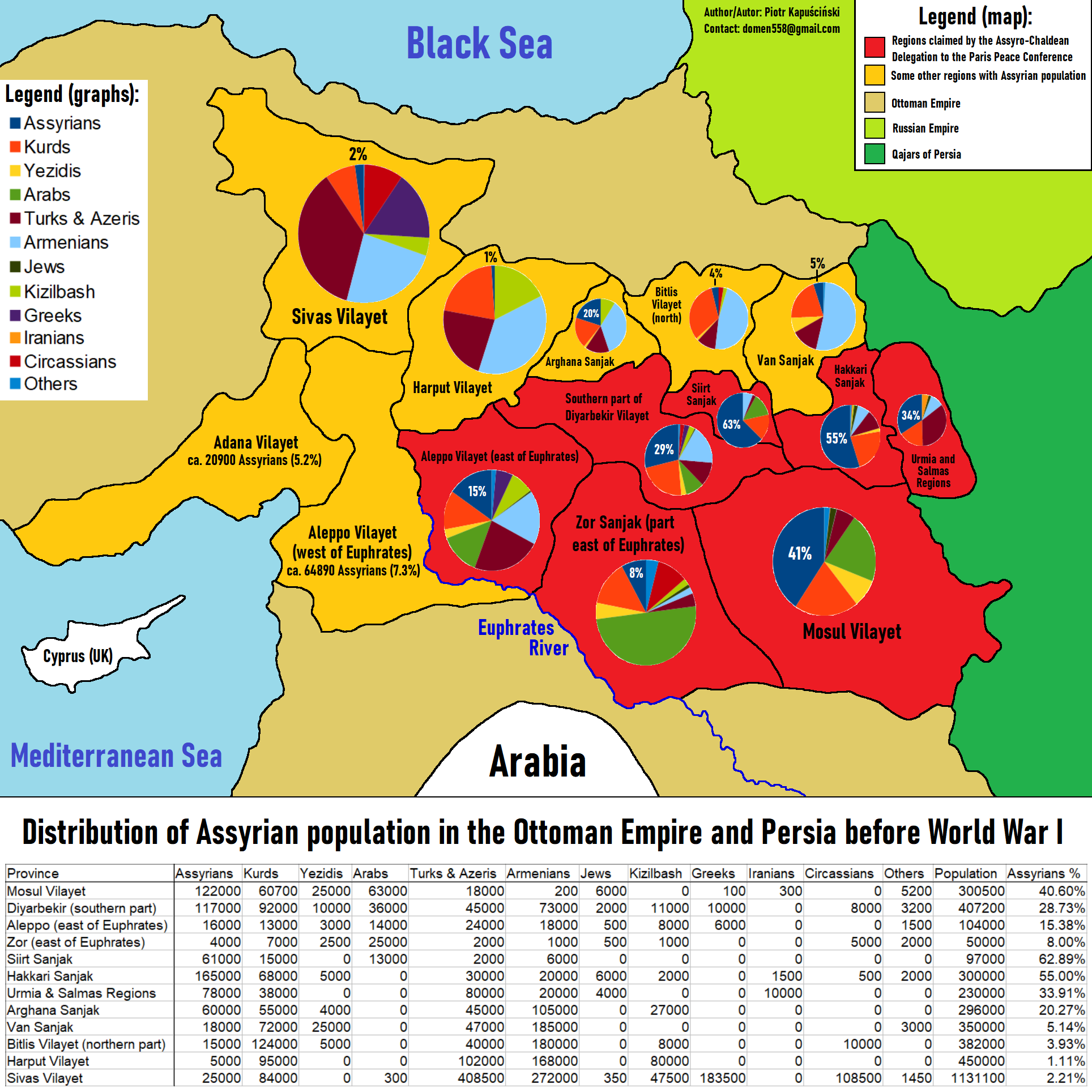
Assyrian population in the Ottoman Empire and Persia before World War I

The ancestral indigenous lands that form the Assyrian homeland are those of ancient Mesopotamia and the Zab rivers, a region currently divided between modern-day Iraq, southeastern Turkey, northwestern Iran, and northeastern Syria. This includes the cities of Nineveh (Mosul), Nuhadra (Dohuk), Arrapḫa/Beth Garmai (Kirkuk), Al Qosh, Tesqopa and Arbela (Erbil), Urmia, and Hakkari (a large region which comprises the modern towns of Yüksekova, Hakkâri, Çukurca, Şemdinli and Uludere), Edessa/Urhoy (Urfa), Harran, Amida (Diyarbakır) and Tur Abdin (Midyat and Kafro), among others.

Some of the cities are presently under Kurdish control and some still have an Assyrian presence, namely those in Iraq, as the Assyrian population in southeastern Turkey (such as those in Hakkari) was ethnically cleansed during the Assyrian genocide or Sayfo. Those who survived fled to unaffected areas of Assyrian settlement in northern Iraq, with others settling in Iraqi cities to the south. Though many also settled quickly to neighbouring countries in and around the Caucasus and Middle East like Armenia, Syria, Georgia, southern Russia, Lebanon and Jordan. Currently, there are more Assyrians in the diaspora as opposed to the homeland. These include North America, the Levant, Australia, Europe, Russia and the Caucasus. Emigration was triggered by Sayfo, as well as religious persecution. The most recent reasons for emigration are due to events such as the 2003 invasion of Iraq by the United States and its allies, the Syrian civil war, and the emergence of the Islamic State. Of the one million or more Iraqis who have fled Iraq since the occupation, nearly 40% were indigenous Assyrians, even though Assyrians accounted for only around 3% of the pre-war Iraqi population.

In ancient times, Akkadian-speaking Assyrians have existed in what is now Syria, Jordan, Palestine, Israel and Lebanon, among other modern countries, due to the sprawl of the Neo-Assyrian empire in the region. Though recent settlement of Christian Assyrians in Nisabina, Qamishli, Al-Hasakah, Al-Qahtaniyah, Al Darbasiyah, Al-Malikiyah, Amuda, Tel Tamer and a few other small towns in Al-Hasakah Governorate in Syria, occurred in the early 1930s, when they fled from northern Iraq after they were targeted and slaughtered during the Simele massacre. The Assyrians in Syria did not have Syrian citizenship and title to their established land until late the 1940s.

Sizable Assyrian populations only remain in Syria, where an estimated 400,000 Assyrians live, and in Iraq, where an estimated 300,000 Assyrians live. This is a decline from an estimate of 1,100,000 Assyrians in the 1980s, following instability caused by the American invasion of Iraq in 2003. In Iran and Turkey, only small populations remain, with only 20,000 Assyrians in Iran, and a small but growing Assyrian population in Turkey, where 25,000 Assyrians live, mostly in the cities and not the ancient settlements. This marks a significant decline from the 1980s, when Turkey had about 70,000 Assyrians and Iran had an estimated 50,000 living in Tehran alone in 1987.

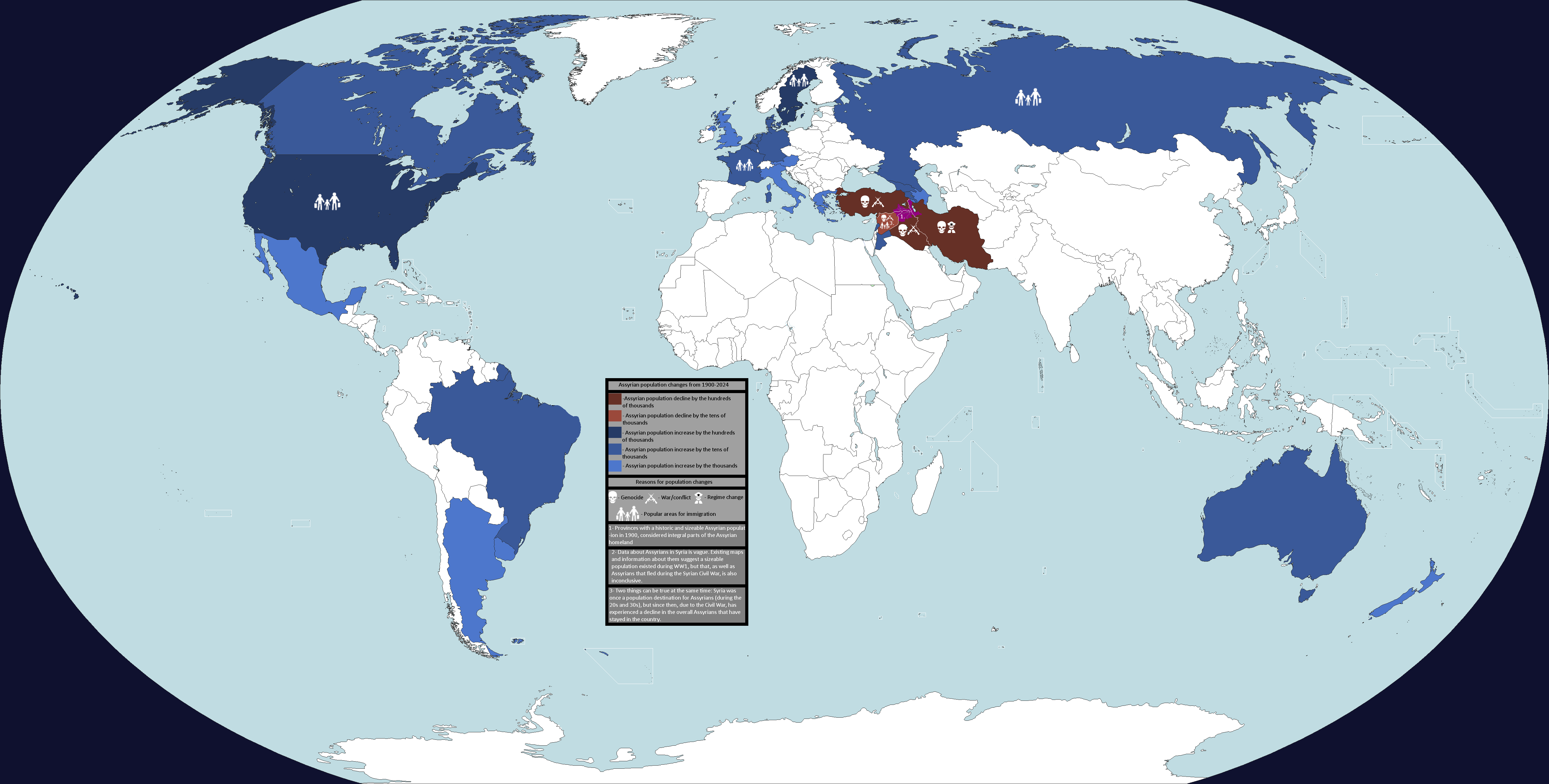
Worldwide population changes of the Assyrian population, showing a steep decline in areas where Assyrians lived historically, however a sharp increase in the overall population of the Assyrian diaspora.

In Tur Abdin, a traditional centre of Assyrian culture, there are only 2,500 Assyrians left. Down from 50,000 in the 1960 census, but up from 1,000 in 1992. This sharp decline is due to an intense conflict between Turkey and the PKK in the 1980s. However, there are an estimated 25,000 Assyrians in all of Turkey, with most living in Istanbul. Most Assyrians currently reside in the West due to the centuries of persecution by the neighboring Muslims. Prior to the Islamic State of Iraq and the Levant, in a 2013 report by a Chaldean Syriac Assyrian Popular Council official, it was estimated that 300,000 Assyrians remained in Iraq. In 1823, reports by Georg Hassel found that Assyrians constituted at least 5% of the Ottoman Empire's Asian population.

=== Subgroups ===
There are predominantly three Christian Assyrian subgroups: Eastern, Western, Chaldean. These subdivisions are only partially overlapping linguistically, historically, culturally, and religiously.

- The Eastern subgroup historically inhabited Hakkari in the northern Zagros Mountains, the Simele and Sapna valleys in Nuhadra, and parts of the Nineveh and Urmia Plains. They speak Northeastern Neo-Aramaic dialects and are religiously diverse, adhering to the East Syriac churches and Protestantism.
- The Western subgroup, historically inhabited Tur Abdin. They mainly speak the Central Neo-Aramaic language Surayt (also known as Turoyo). Most adhere to the West Syriac churches, such as the Syriac Orthodox Church of Antioch and the Syriac Catholic Church. Today there are also evangelical groups that have founded their own churches in the diaspora. Historically, Syriac Orthodox culture was centred in two monasteries near Mardin (west of Tur Abdin), Mor Gabriel and Deyrulzafaran. Historic Assyrian villages, some of which are still inhabited by Assyrians in Turabdin, include the following: Aynwardo, Anhil, Kafro, Miden, Arnas, Beth Debe, Beth Kustan, Beth Sbirino, Dayro da-Slibo, Hrabemishka, Qartmin, Arkah, Arbo, Mizizah, Kfraze, Hah, Marbobo, Salah, Sare and Hapsis. In addition, the cities of Midyat and Beth Zabday (Azech) were historically Assyrian cities with an Assyrian majority, this is no longer the case today. Outside the area of core Assyrian settlement in Tur Abdin, there were also sizable populations in the towns of Diyarbakır, Urfa, Harput, and Adiyaman as well as some other villages.
- The Chaldean subgroup is a subgroup of the Eastern one. The group is often equated with the adherents of the Chaldean Catholic Church, however not all Chaldean Catholics identify as strictly Chaldean. They are traditionally speakers of Northeastern Neo-Aramaic dialects, however there are some Turoyo speakers. In Iraq, Chaldean Catholics inhabit the western Nineveh Plains villages of Alqosh, Batnaya, Tel Keppe and Tesqopa, as well as the Nahla valley and Aqra. In Syria they live in Aleppo and the Al-Hasakah Governorate. In Turkey, they live scattered in Istanbul, Diyarbakir, Sirnak Province and Mardin Province.

With its many historic churches & monasteries, Tur Abdin is considered the spiritual centre of the Syriac Orthodox Assyrians.

A map depicting Assyrian relocation after Seyfo in 1914

Assyrian Jews are speakers of Judeo-Aramaic dialects closely shared with their Christian counterparts; these are considered nearly extinct, replaced by modern Hebrew in the next generation after immigration to Israel. Although often subsumed within broader studies of Iraqi or Mizrahi Jewry, the distinct history and cultural features of these communities from the Assyrian homeland have received limited scholarly attention.

=== Diaspora ===
Events following the Assyrian genocide, massacres of: Badr Khan, Diyarbakır, Adana, Simele, and the al-Anfal campaign have contributed to a western diaspora. Today, more Assyrians reside outside their homeland than within it. The largest Assyrian diaspora communities are found in:

- United States (119,402–600,000)
- Germany (100,000–180,000)
- Sweden (100,000–150,000)
- Australia (60,000)
- Canada (31,800)
- Netherlands (25,000–35,000)

By ethnic percentage, the largest Assyrian diaspora communities are located in Södertälje in Stockholm County, Sweden, and in Fairfield City in Sydney, Australia, where they are the leading ethnic group in the suburbs of Fairfield, Fairfield Heights, Prairiewood and Greenfield Park. There is also a sizable Assyrian community in Melbourne, Australia (Broadmeadows, Meadow Heights and Craigieburn) In the United States, Assyrians are mostly found in Chicago (Niles and Skokie), Detroit (Sterling Heights, and West Bloomfield Township), Phoenix, Modesto (Stanislaus County) and Turlock.

Small Assyrian communities are found in San Diego, Sacramento and Fresno in the United States, Toronto in Canada and also in London, UK (London Borough of Ealing). In Germany, pocket-sized Assyrian communities are scattered throughout Munich, Frankfurt, Stuttgart, Berlin and Wiesbaden. In Paris, France, the commune of Sarcelles has a small number of Assyrians. Assyrians in the Netherlands mainly live in the east of the country, in the province of Overijssel. In Russia, small groups of Assyrians mostly reside in Krasnodar Kray and Moscow.

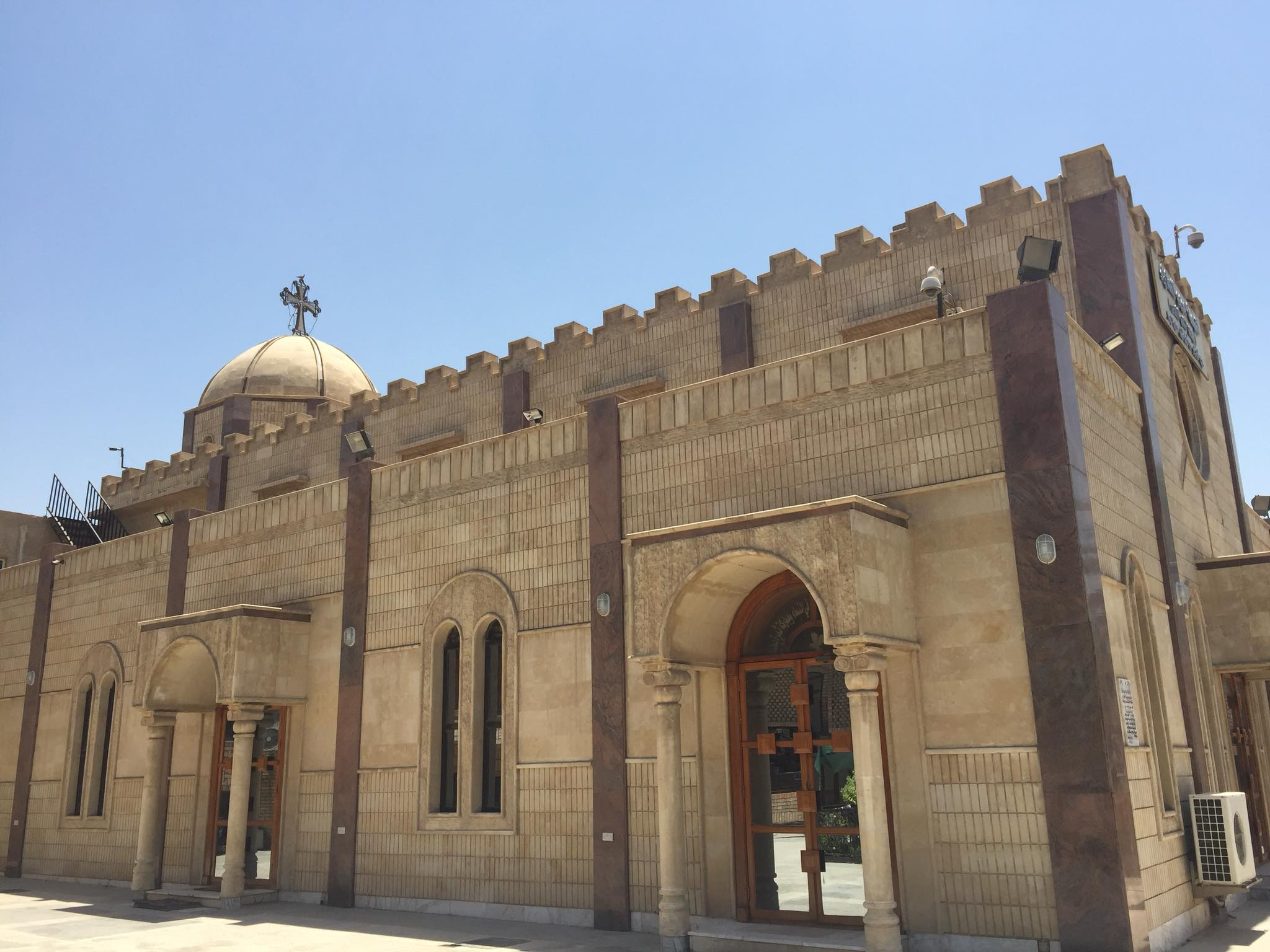
Assyrian Church of Our Virgin Lady in Baghdad.

To note, the Assyrians residing in California and Russia tend to be from Iran, whilst those in Chicago and Sydney are predominantly Iraqi Assyrians. More recently, Syrian Assyrians are growing in size in Sydney after a huge influx of new arrivals in 2016, who were granted asylum under the federal government's special humanitarian intake. The Assyrians in Detroit are primarily Chaldean speakers, who also originate from Iraq. Assyrians in such European countries as Sweden and Germany would usually be Turoyo-speakers or Western Assyrians, and tend to be originally from Turkey. Only Turkey is reported to be experiencing a population increase of Assyrians in the four countries constituting their homeland, largely consisting of refugees from Syria and a smaller number from Europe.

Between 1918 and 1919, nearly 50,000 Assyrians from Urmia, Salmas and Van settled to urban centers such as Baghdad, while others relocated to villages and regions within Iraq. These communities in Baghdad often maintained their native traditions and dialects even as they integrated into local Iraqi society.

== Identity ==
Assyrian flag, adopted in 1968

Syriac-Aramean flag

Chaldean flag, published in 1999

In the modern period, Assyrians use a variety of terms for self-identification, reflecting differing perspectives within their communities. The Assyrian population is broadly divided into three major religious branches that differ in ecclesiastical, dialectal, and political outlook. In some cases, individuals otherwise considered Assyrian have rejected the designation entirely. Disputes among subgroups have increasingly taken on a global dimension due to the growth of diaspora communities and the spread of online forums and advocacy platforms, complicating collective efforts to promote shared national interests and at times being exploited by political opponents.

During the 19th century, English archaeologists Austen Henry Layard and William Ainger Wigram affirmed that Assyrians were descendants of their ancient counterparts, a view associated with Layard's excavations at Nineveh and later popularized through Wigram's writings and his involvement with the Church of the East. In mid-twentieth-century American literature, Assyrians served as a less politically charged and more universal ethnic identity within the literary establishment. A notable example is Joseph Heller's debut novel, Catch-22 (1961), in which the protagonist's background was revised from Jewish to Assyrian-American to appeal to a broader audience. It went on to achieve significant commercial and critical success, becoming one of the most influential novels of its era.

In contemporary contexts, Assyrian identity is often politically sensitive. Scholars note that governments in parts of the Middle East have traditionally regarded minority affairs as internal matters, sometimes rejecting claims of discrimination or the recognition of distinct minority groups, partly due to concerns that such claims could be used in international political disputes. In countries of the diaspora, Assyrians are sometimes categorized simply as Christians, with little recognition of their ethnic identity. Due to this lack of visibility, Assyrians, alongside other ethnic minorities in the region, have faced pressures of cultural assimilation, including Turkification, Kurdification, or Arabization.

=== Subdivisions ===
Historical Syriac Church divisions

Below are terms used in modern times for self-identification among Syriac-speaking Christian communities. These terms are used by different communities within this broader ethnolinguistic group and reflect historical, ecclesiastical, and political perspectives:

- Assyrian, named after their ethnicity as the descendants of the ancient Assyrian people, is advocated by followers from within all Middle Eastern based East and West Syriac Rite Churches.
- Chaldean is a term that was used for centuries by western writers and scholars as a designation for the Aramaic language. It was so used by Jerome, and was still the normal terminology in the nineteenth century. Only in 1445 did it begin to be used to designate Aramaic speakers who had entered communion with the Catholic Church. This happened at the Council of Florence, which accepted the profession of faith that Timothy, metropolitan of the Aramaic speakers in Cyprus, made in Aramaic, and which decreed that "nobody shall in future dare to call [...] Chaldeans, Nestorians". Previously, when there were as yet no Catholic Aramaic speakers of Mesopotamian origin, the term "Chaldean" was applied with explicit reference to their "Nestorian" religion. Thus Jacques de Vitry wrote of them in 1220/1 that "they denied that Mary was the Mother of God and claimed that Christ existed in two persons. They consecrated leavened bread and used the 'Chaldean' (Syriac) language". Until the second half of the 19th century, the term "Chaldean" continued in general use for East Syriac Christians, whether "Nestorian" or Catholic. In 1840, upon visiting Mesopotamia, Horatio Southgate reported that local Chaldeans consider themselves to be descended from ancient Assyrians, and in some later works also noted the same origin of local Jacobites.
- Aramean, also known as Aramean (Syriac), named after the ancient Aramean people, is advocated by some followers from within Middle Eastern based West Syriac Rite Churches. Furthermore, Assyrians identifying as Aramean have obtained recognition from the Israeli government. To note, ancient Arameans were a separate ethnic group that lived concurrently with the Assyrian empire in what is now Syria and parts of Lebanon, Israel the West Bank and Gaza, Jordan, Iraq and Turkey. In the Assyrian community, the label is most prominent within the Syriac Orthodox Church.

=== Assyrian vs. Syrian naming controversy ===
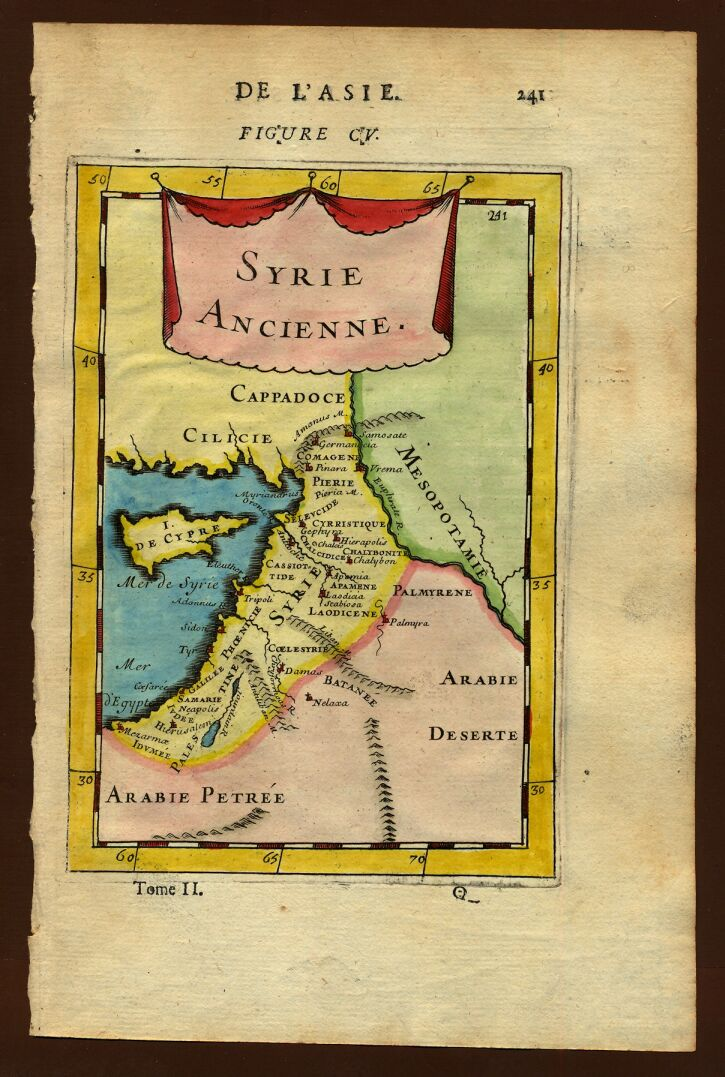
The proximity between Roman Syria and Mesopotamia in the 1st century AD, Alain Manesson Mallet, 1683

As early as the 8th century BC Luwian and Cilician subject rulers referred to their Assyrian overlords as Syrian, a western Indo-European corruption of the original term Assyrian. The Greeks used the terms "Syrian" and "Assyrian" interchangeably to indicate the indigenous Arameans, Assyrians and other inhabitants of the Near East. Herodotus considered "Syria" west of the Euphrates. Starting from the 2nd century BC onwards, ancient writers referred to the Seleucid ruler as the King of Syria or King of the Syrians. The Seleucids designated the districts of Seleucis and Coele-Syria explicitly as Syria, and ruled the Syrians as indigenous populations residing west of the Euphrates, in contrast to Assyrians who had their native homeland in Mesopotamia east of the Euphrates.

This version of the name took hold in the Hellenic lands to the west of the old Assyrian Empire, thus during Greek Seleucid rule from 323 BC the name Assyria was altered to Syria, and this term was also applied to areas west of Euphrates which had been an Assyrian colony, and from this point the Greeks applied the term without distinction between the Assyrians of Mesopotamia and Arameans of the Levant.

The question of ethnic identity and self-designation is sometimes connected to the scholarly debate on the etymology of "Syria". The question has a long history of academic controversy, but majority mainstream opinion currently strongly favours that Syria is indeed ultimately derived from the Assyrian term Aššūrāyu. Meanwhile, some scholars has disclaimed the theory of Syrian being derived from Assyrian as "simply naive", and detracted its importance to the naming conflict.

Rudolf Macuch points out that the Eastern Neo-Aramaic press initially used the term "Syrian" (suryêta) and only much later, with the rise of nationalism, switched to "Assyrian" (atorêta). According to Tsereteli, however, a Georgian equivalent of "Assyrians" appears in ancient Georgian, Armenian and Russian documents. This correlates with the theory of the nations to the East of Mesopotamia knew the group as Assyrians, while to the West, beginning with Greek influence, the group was known as Syrians. Syria being a Greek corruption of Assyria. The debate appears to have been settled by the discovery of the Çineköy inscription in favour of Syria being derived from Assyria.

The Çineköy inscription is a Hieroglyphic Luwian-Phoenician bilingual, uncovered from Çineköy, Adana Province, Turkey (ancient Cilicia), dating to the 8th century BC. Originally published by Tekoglu and Lemaire (2000), it was more recently the subject of a 2006 paper published in the Journal of Near Eastern Studies, in which the author, Robert Rollinger, lends support to the age-old debate of the name "Syria" being derived from "Assyria" (see Etymology of Syria).

The object on which the inscription is found is a monument belonging to Urikki, vassal king of Hiyawa (i.e., Cilicia), dating to the eighth century BC. In this monumental inscription, Urikki made reference to the relationship between his kingdom and his Assyrian overlords. The Luwian inscription reads "Sura/i" whereas the Phoenician translation reads 'ŠR or "Ashur" which, according to Rollinger (2006), "settles the problem once and for all".

The modern terminological problem goes back to colonial times, but it became more acute in 1946, when with the independence of Syria, the adjective Syrian referred to an independent state. The controversy is not restricted to exonyms like English "Assyrian" vs. "Aramaean", but also applies to self-designation in Neo-Aramaic, the minority "Aramaean" faction endorses both Sūryāyē ܣܘܪܝܝܐ and Ārāmayē ܐܪܡܝܐ, while the majority "Assyrian" faction endorses Āṯūrāyē ܐܬܘܪܝܐ or Sūryāyē.

== Culture ==
An Assyrian child in Alqosh dressed in traditional clothing

Assyrian culture is largely influenced by Christianity. There are many Assyrian customs that are common in other Middle Eastern cultures. Main festivals occur during religious holidays such as Easter and Christmas. There are also secular holidays such as Kha b'Nissan (vernal equinox).

Assyrians are politically secular, left-leaning, and typically attach to their towns, villages, and church communities, expressed in the form of either regionalism or municipalism. They are generally endogamous, marrying within their own ethnic group, although exogamous marriages within the Christian faith are not perceived as taboo. Assyrians and Armenians share common geographic origins and have both faced religious persecution as some of the first Christians; Assyrian-Armenian partners are common in both the homeland and the diaspora.

People often greet and bid relatives farewell with a kiss on each cheek and by saying "ܫܠܡܐ ܥܠܝܟ" Shlama/Shlomo lokh, which means: "Peace be upon you" in Neo-Aramaic. Others are greeted with a handshake with the right hand only; according to Middle Eastern customs, the left hand is associated with evil. Similarly, shoes may not be left facing up, one may not have their feet facing anyone directly, whistling at night is thought to waken evil spirits, etc. A parent will often place an eye pendant on their baby to prevent "an evil eye being cast upon it".

Assyrian clothing varies from village to village. Clothing is usually blue, red, green, yellow, and purple; these colors are also used as embroidery on a white piece of clothing. Decoration is lavish in Assyrian costumes, and sometimes involves jewellery. The conical hats of traditional Assyrian dress have changed little over millennia from those worn in ancient Mesopotamia, and until the 19th and early 20th centuries the ancient Mesopotamian tradition of braiding or platting of hair, beards and moustaches was still commonplace.

=== Language ===
A map of Assyrian dialects

To the native speaker, the language is usually called Surayt, Soureth, Suret or a similar regional variant. A wide variety of dialects exist, mainly Suret, and Surayt. These dialects are usually written using Syriac script, a derivative of the ancient Aramaic script. There is a considerable amount of mutual intelligibility between Suret dialects. Therefore, these "languages" would generally be considered to be dialects rather than separate languages. The Jewish Aramaic languages of Lishan Didan and Lishanid Noshan share intelligibility with these varieties, and Assyrian Jews in Israel have founded The Committee for the Revival of Aramit-Ashurit Language. The mutual intelligibility between Suret and Surayt/Turoyo is, depending on the dialect, limited to partial, and may be asymmetrical.

The Assyrian language is classified as definitely endangered by UNESCO. Being stateless, speakers are typically multilingual, knowing both their native language and those of the societies they reside in. Although many Assyrians have left their homeland, the ones residing in Arab countries speak Arabic alongside their native tongue, and may bring their Arabic language to the diaspora. The most commonly spoken languages by Assyrians in the diaspora include English, German and Swedish. Historically many Assyrians also spoke Turkish, Armenian, Azeri, Kurdish, and Persian and a smaller number of Assyrians that remain in Iran, Turkey (Istanbul and Tur Abdin) and Armenia still do today.

The Neo-Aramaic languages spoken by Assyrians, including Suret and Turoyo, descend from Late Old Eastern Aramaic, which served as a lingua franca during the later phase of the Neo-Assyrian Empire. Ancient Assyrians originally spoke the East Semitic Akkadian language but gradually adopted Aramaic, which eventually replaced Akkadian and Sumerian in administration and everyday use. Aramaic, the language of the Arameans, remained the lingua franca of West Asia for centuries and influenced languages such as Hebrew, Sanna, Arabic, Mongolian, and Uighur. Both Aramaic and its Neo-Aramaic dialects are among the oldest continuously spoken and written languages in the Middle East, with a history spanning over 3,000 years. It was also spoken by Jesus of Nazareth, and Assyrians heard their language in the 2004 film The Passion of the Christ.

==== Script ====
Assyrians predominantly use the Syriac script, which is written from right to left. It is one of the Semitic abjads directly descending from the Aramaic alphabet and shares similarities with the Phoenician, Hebrew and the Arabic alphabets. It has 22 letters representing consonants, three of which can be also used to indicate vowels. The vowel sounds are supplied either by the reader's memory or by optional diacritic marks. Syriac is a cursive script where some, but not all, letters connect within a word. It was used to write the Syriac language from the 1st century AD.

The oldest and classical form of the alphabet is the ʾEsṭrangēlā script. Although ʾEsṭrangēlā is no longer used as the main script for writing Syriac, it has received some revival since the 10th century, and it has been added to the Unicode Standard in September, 1999. The East Syriac dialect is usually written in the Maḏnḥāyā form of the alphabet, which is often translated as "contemporary", reflecting its use in writing modern Neo-Aramaic. The West Syriac dialect is usually written in the Serṭā form of the alphabet. Most of the letters are clearly derived from ʾEsṭrangēlā, but are simplified, flowing lines.

Furthermore, for practical reasons, Assyrian people sometimes use the Latin alphabet, especially in social media.

==== Naming traditions ====
Family names largely crystallized between the mid-19th and early 20th centuries, driven by church registry requirements, land and tax reforms, and census mandates. They generally trace their origins to three primary socio-historical categories.

The first category consists of patronymics and frozen given names, where a substantial portion of surnames derive directly from ancestral given names. Because these names were fluidly generated from recent ascendants, individuals sharing a surname are frequently not patrilineally related in a tight clan sense. Common examples include Yonan, Gewargis, Shlimon, Odisho, Oraham, and Toma. The second category features the Bet or Bit house and clan prefix. Equivalent to "House of," this prefix historically denoted extended kinship networks, clan groups, or ancestral compounds within village ecosystems. In mountainous tribal societies, these prefixes linked families to a founding patriarch or lineage, such as Bet-Yaqo, Bet-Warda, or Bet-Kano. The third category comprises ecclesiastical, occupational, and feudal titles stemming from community, religious, or administrative offices held within the village or church structure. These include Malik, denoting a regional or tribal chieftain or leader; Qashisha or Keshish, referring to a priest; Shamasha, designating a deacon; and Rabban, denoting a monk or scholar.

In the autonomous and semi-autonomous Assyrian mountain communities, such as the Hakkari tribes of Tyari, Tkhuma, Jilu, Baz, and Diz, social stratification heavily influenced lineage and identity. Independent mountain tribes functioned as ashiret clans governed by traditional chiefs and tribal assemblies, where lineage, territory, and defense were tightly bound to clan membership. Conversely, non-tribal Assyrian farming and artisan communities living across the plains and foothills functioned as rayat tributary communities, where identity was anchored primarily to specific monastic centers, parish churches, and native villages such as Alqosh, Bartella, Qaraqosh, or villages across Tur Abdin.

Assyrians who settled in the Russian Empire frequently had their surnames administratively suffixed with Slavic markers or structurally modified for state integration. In Iraq, Syria, and Turkey, state-led Arabization and Turkification policies mandated the formal registration of citizens under standardized Arabic or Turkish civil surnames, creating a dual reality where traditional Bet names or Syriac church names were preserved strictly for internal community use. Meanwhile, resettlement in North America, Europe, and Australia frequently involved the phonetic respelling, truncation, or adaptation of long Syriac surnames to fit administrative and phonetic frameworks.

=== Religion ===
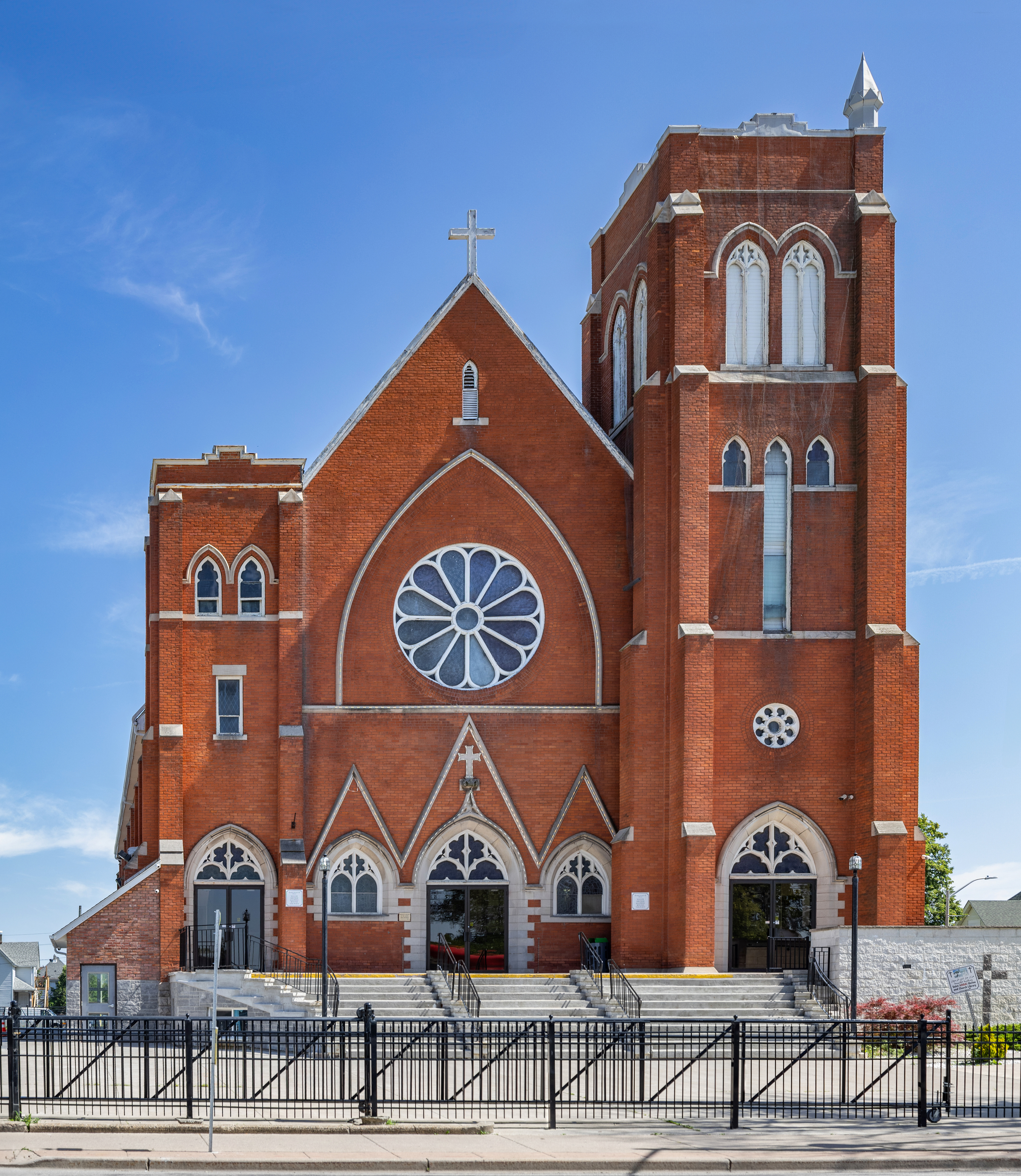
Holy Family Chaldean Catholic Church, Windsor.

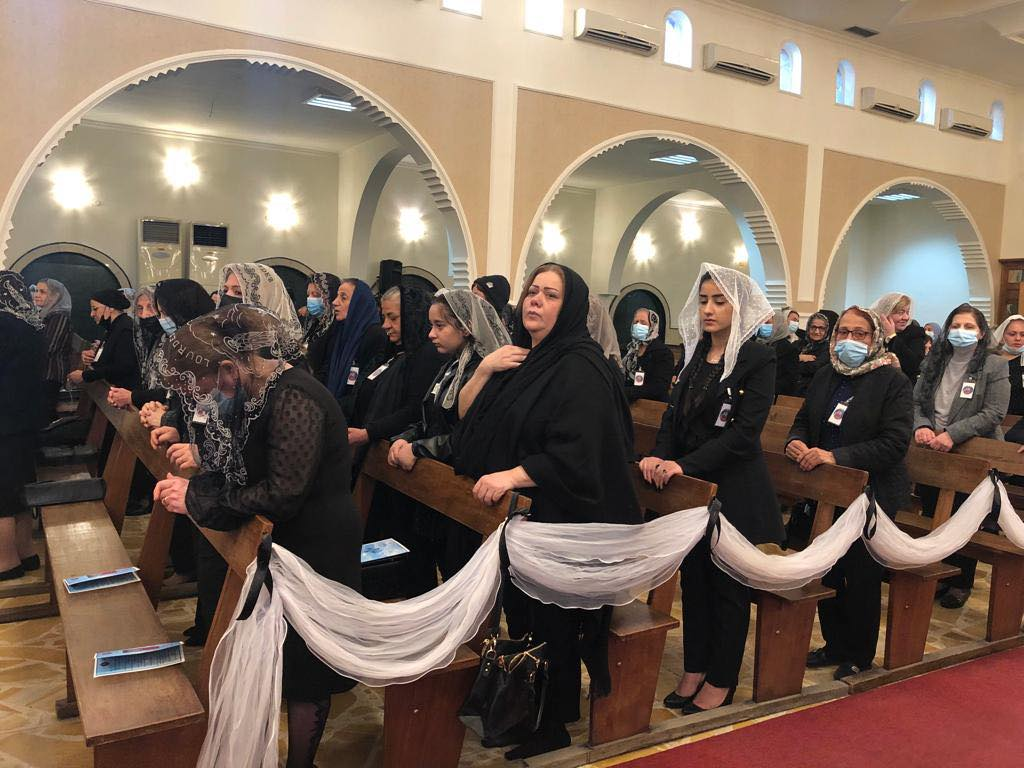
Chaldean Catholics praying in a Holy Qurbana in Baghdad, Iraq.

Assyrians are almost exclusively Christian, with most adhering to the East and West Syriac Rites of Christianity; both use Classical Syriac as their liturgical language. The churches of the East Syriac Rite include the Chaldean Catholic Church, with about 600,000 members, the Assyrian Church of the East, with an estimated 400,000 members, and the Ancient Church of the East, with some 100,000 members. The West Syriac Rite includes the Syriac Orthodox Church, which has over 1 million members worldwide, and the Syriac Catholic Church. The Syriac Orthodox Church traces its origins back to Acts 11:26 when Paul and Barnabas taught believers and called them Christians. The Assyrians were among the earliest Christians, and Syriac Christianity points its identity in both a Jewish-Christian heritage and the Hellenists of Antioch.

In 1850, the Presbyterian Church opened its mission in Mosul. A small minority of Assyrians accepted the Protestant Reformation and became Reform Orthodox in the 20th century, possibly due to British influences, and are now organised in the Assyrian Evangelical Church, the Assyrian Pentecostal Church and other Protestant/Reform Orthodox Assyrian groups. While there are some atheist Assyrians, they tend to still associate with some denomination.

Assyrian Jews are a Jewish minority of Assyrians who mostly reside in Israel following their recent emigration. Their origins can be linked to the Ten Lost Tribes exiled by the Neo-Assyrian Empire, as well as to conversions in the kingdom of Adiabene.

Many members of the following churches consider themselves Assyrian. Ethnic identities are often deeply intertwined with religion, a legacy of the Ottoman Millet system. The group is traditionally characterized as adhering to various churches of Syriac Christianity and speaking Neo-Aramaic languages. It is subdivided into:

- adherents of the Assyrian Church of the East and Ancient Church of the East following the East Syriac Rite, also known as Nestorians
- adherents of the Chaldean Catholic Church following the East Syriac Rite, also known as Chaldeans
- adherents of the Syriac Orthodox Church following the West Syriac Rite, also known as Jacobites
- adherents of the Syriac Catholic Church following the West Syriac Rite

Baptism and First Communion are celebrated extensively, similar to a Brit Milah or Bar Mitzvah in Jewish communities. After a death, a gathering is held three days after burial to celebrate the ascension to heaven of the dead person, as of Jesus; after seven days another gathering commemorates their death. A close family member wears only black clothes for forty days and nights, or sometimes a year, as a sign of mourning.

During the "Seyfo" genocide, there were a number of Assyrians who were forced to convert to Islam. They reside in Turkey, and practice Islam but still retain their identity.

Historical religious sites

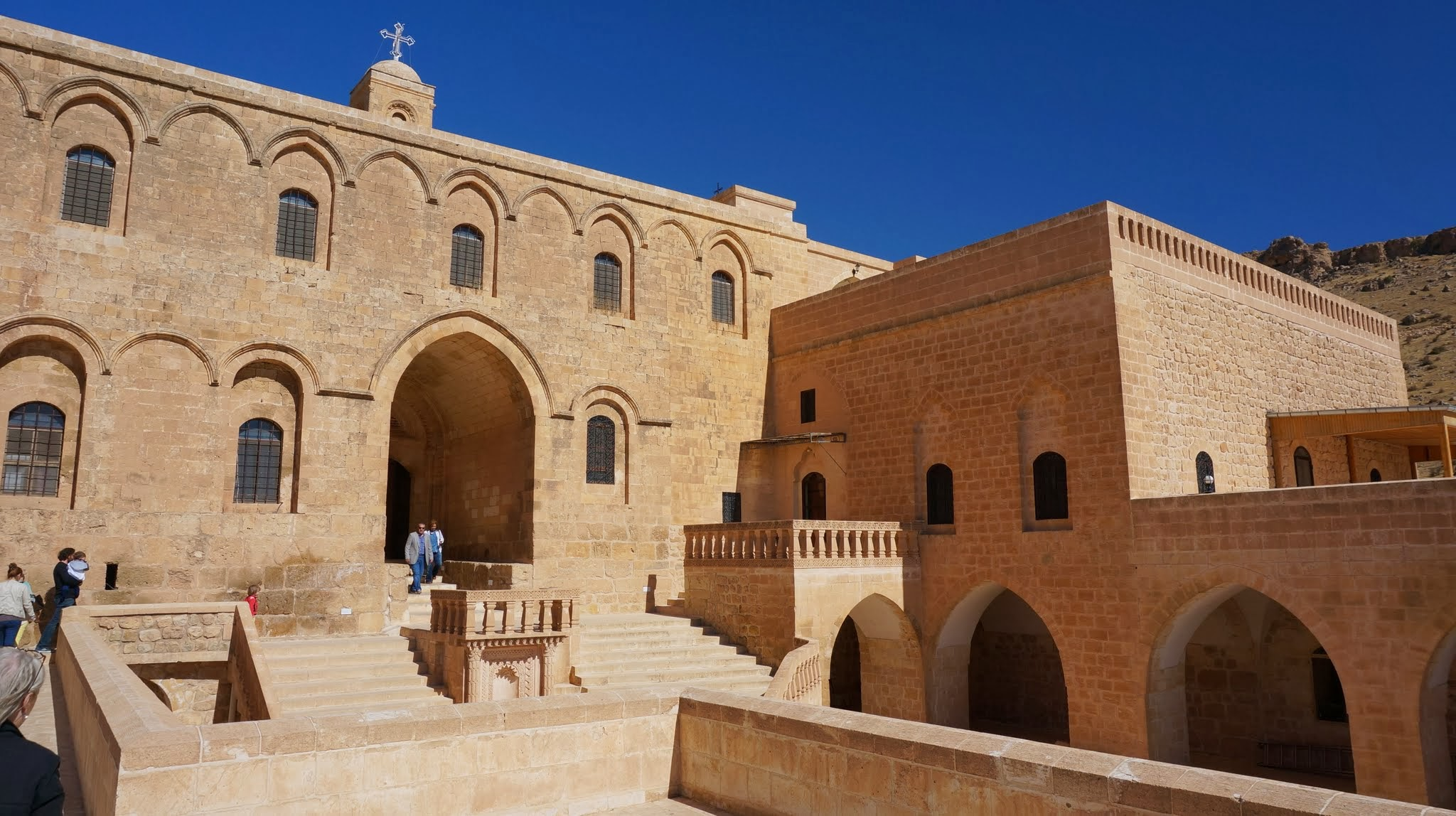
Mor Hananyo Monastery: is an important Syriac Orthodox monastery in Tur Abdin, Turkey.

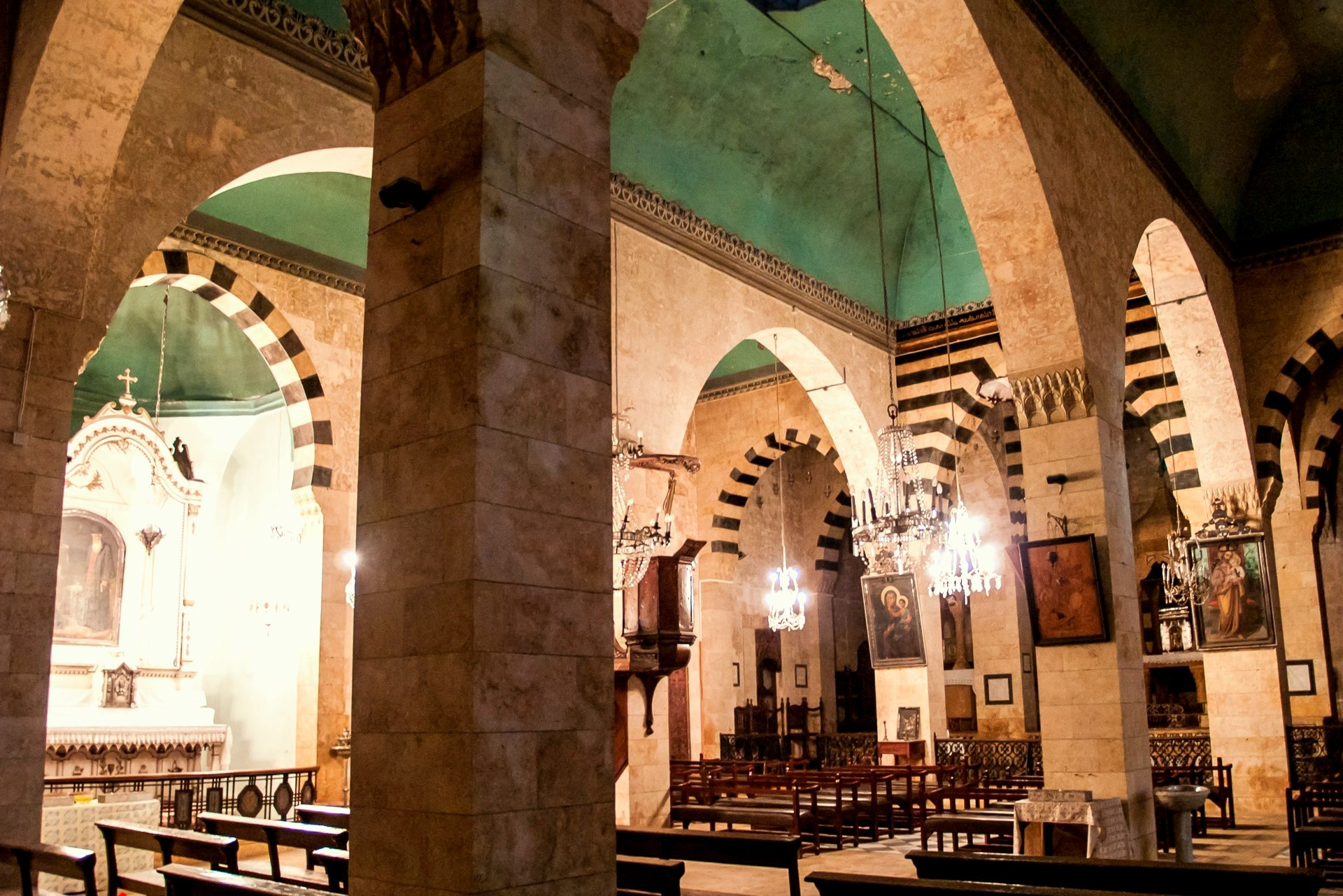
Mar Assia al-Hakim Church: is a Syriac Catholic Church in Al-Jdayde quarter of Aleppo, Syria.

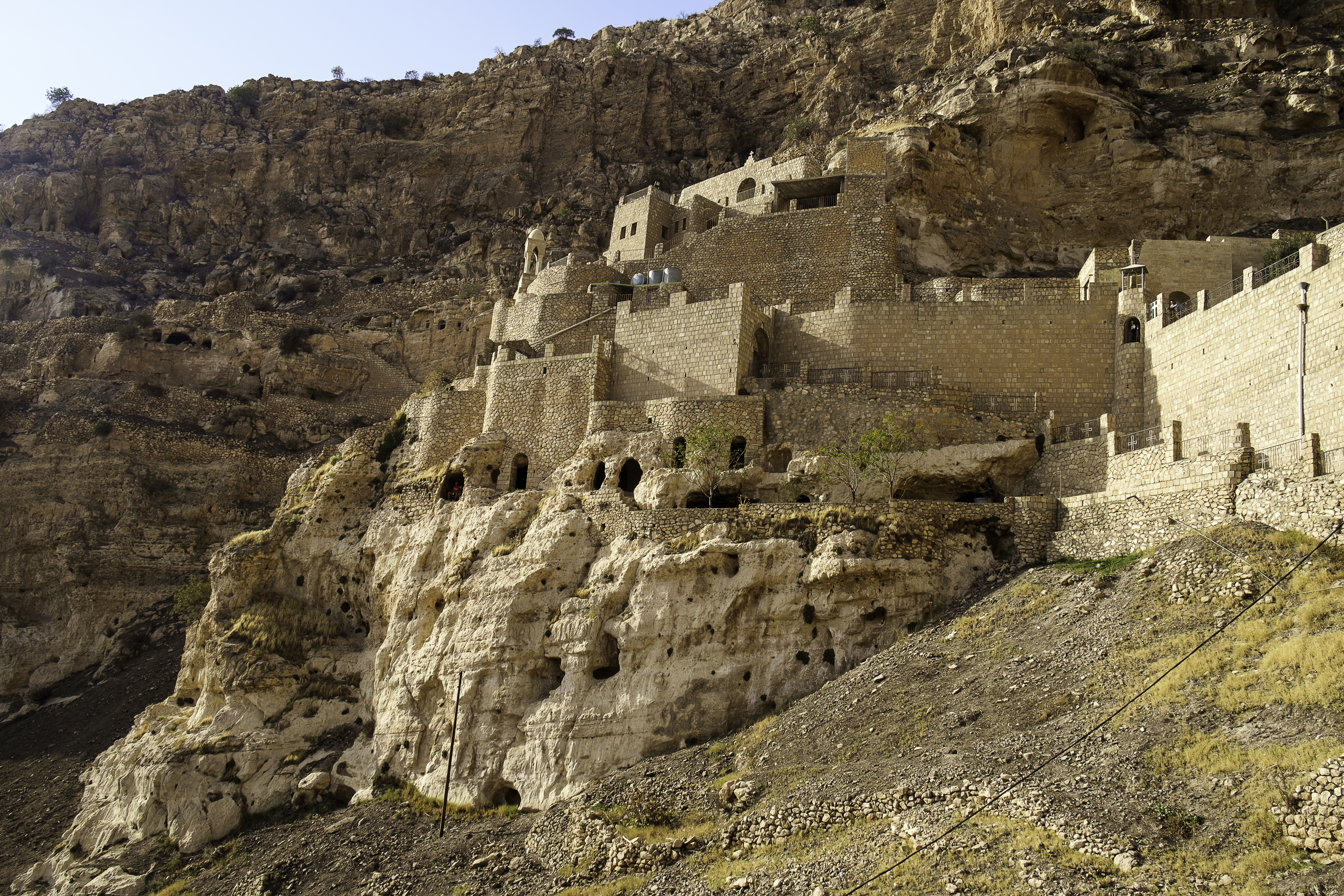
Rabban Hormizd Monastery: is an important monastery of the Chaldean Catholic Church and the Church of the East in Alqosh, Iraq.

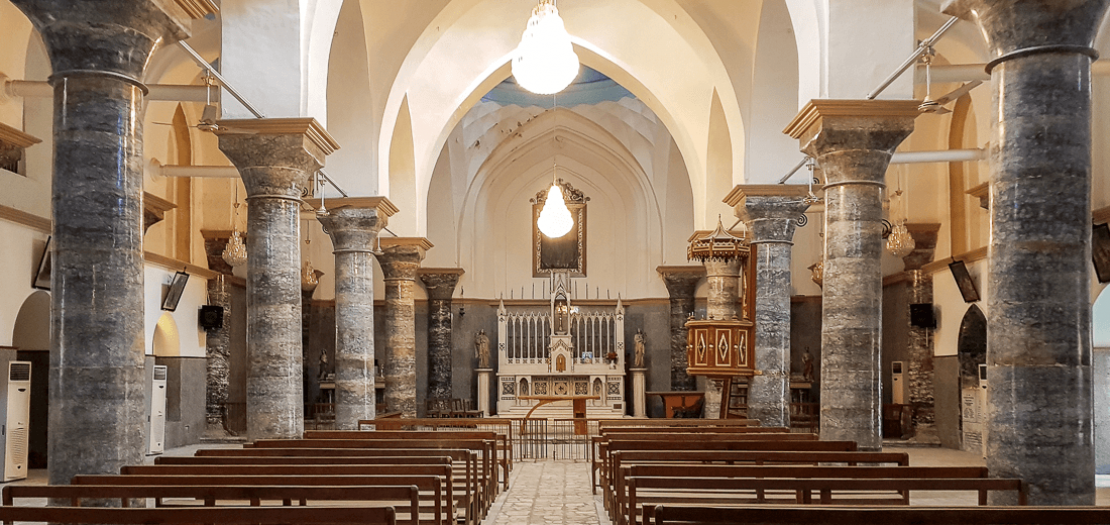
Cathedral of Our Lady of Sorrows: is a Chaldean Catholic cathedral in Baghdad, Iraq

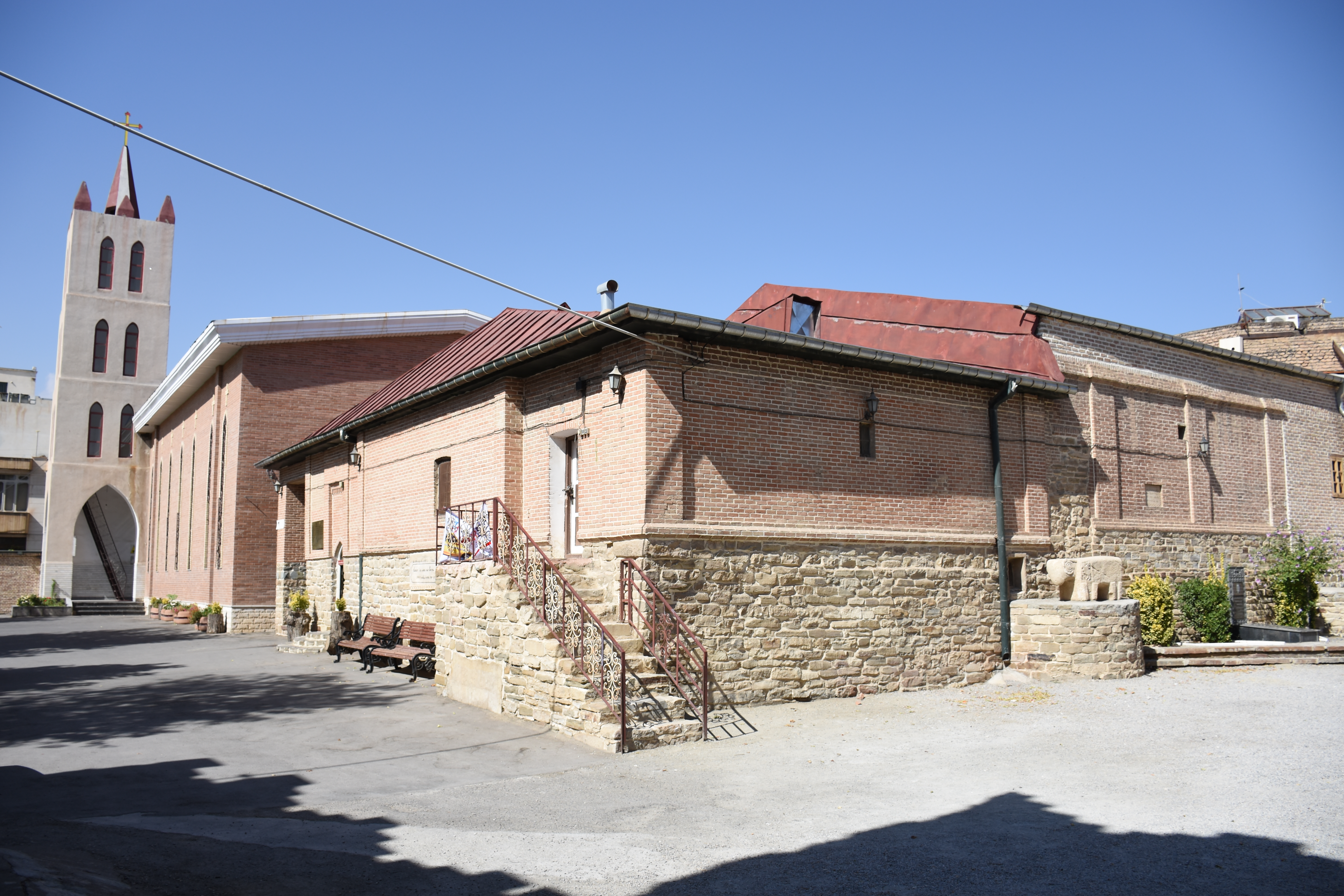
Saint Mary Church: is an ancient Assyrian church located in the city of Urmia, Iran.

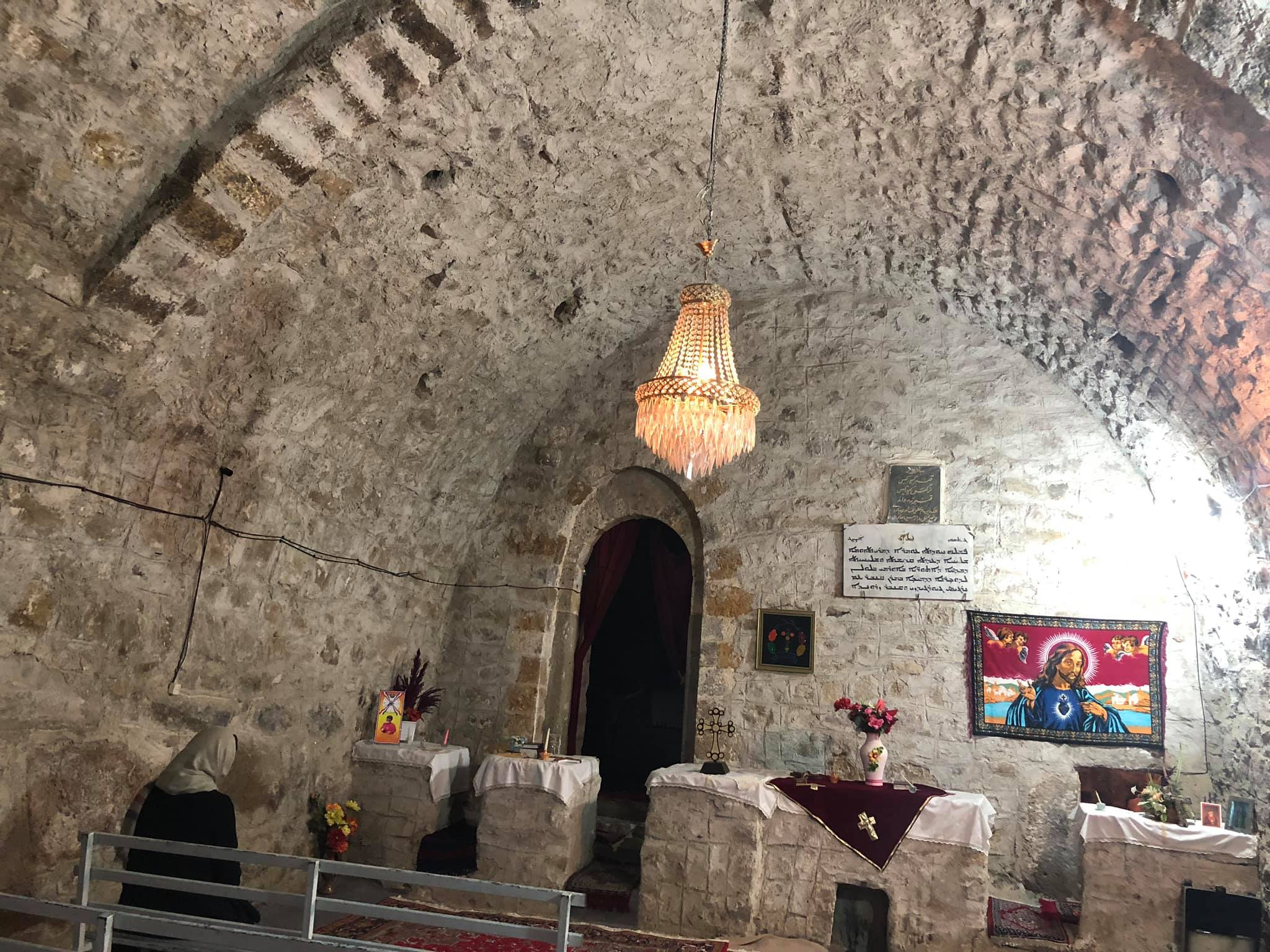
St. Thomas Church, Balowlan, Urmia County, Iran.

=== Music ===
Assyrian music is a combination of traditional folk music and western contemporary music genres, namely pop and soft rock, but also electronic dance music. Instruments traditionally used by Assyrians include the zurna and davula, but has expanded to include guitars, pianos, violins, synthesizers (keyboards and electronic drums), and other instruments.

Some well known Assyrian singers in modern times are Fairuz, Ashur Bet Sargis, Sargon Gabriel, Evin Agassi, Janan Sawa, Juliana Jendo, and Linda George. Assyrian artists that traditionally sing in other languages include Melechesh, Timz and Aril Brikha. Assyrian-Australian band Azadoota performs its songs in the Assyrian language whilst using a western style of instrumentation.

The first international Aramaic Music Festival was held in Lebanon in August 2008 for Assyrian people internationally.

=== Dance ===
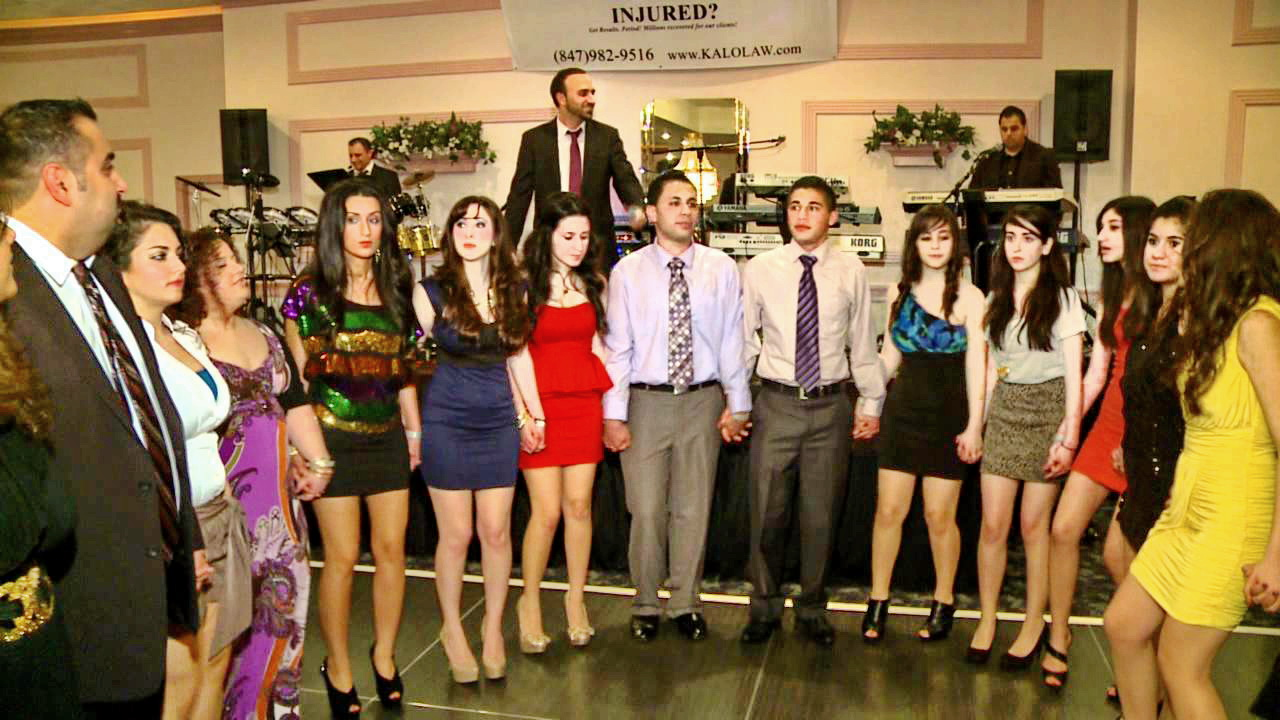
Folk dance in an Assyrian party in Chicago

Assyrians have numerous traditional dances which are performed mostly for special occasions such as weddings. Assyrian dance is a blend of ancient indigenous and general Near Eastern elements. Assyrian folk dances are mainly made up of circle dances that are performed in a line, which may be straight, curved, or both. The most common form of Assyrian folk dance is khigga, which is routinely danced as the bride and groom are welcomed into the wedding reception. Most of the circle dances allow unlimited number of participants, with the exception of the Sabre Dance, which require three at most. Assyrian dances would vary from weak to strong, depending on the mood and tempo of a song.

=== Festivals ===
Assyrian festivals tend to be closely associated with their Christian faith, of which Easter is the most prominent of the celebrations. Members of the Assyrian Church of the East, Chaldean Catholic Church and Syriac Catholic Church follow the Gregorian calendar and as a result celebrate Easter on a Sunday between March 22 and April 25 inclusively.

Members of the Syriac Orthodox Church and Ancient Church of the East celebrate Easter on a Sunday between April 4 and May 8 inclusively on the Gregorian calendar, March 22 and April 25 on the Julian calendar. During Lent, Assyrians are encouraged to fast for 50 days from meat and any other foods which are animal based.

Assyrians celebrate a number of festivals unique to their culture and traditions as well as religious ones:

- Kha b-Nisan (Syriac: ܚܕ ܒܢܝܣܢ, "First of April"), the Assyrian New Year, traditionally on April 1. Assyrians usually wear traditional costumes and hold social events including parades and parties, dancing, and listening to poets telling the story of creation.
- Sauma d-Ba'utha (Classical Syriac: ܒܥܘܬܐ ܕܢܝܢܘܝ̈ܐ Bā'ūṯā ḏ-Ninwāyē, literally "Petition of the Ninevites"), the Nineveh fast, is a three-day period of fasting and prayer and commemorates the repentance of the Ninevites at the hands of Jonah.
- Somikka (Syriac: ܣܘܿܡܝܟܵܐ), All Saints Day, is celebrated to motivate children to fast during Lent through use of frightening costumes. Men in costumes would knock on the doors of family's houses and scare the children into fasting for Lent until the parents would hand them money. The celebration was intended to help poor families afford the expenses incurred for Easter.
- Kalu d'Sulaqa (Syriac: ܟܵܠܘܿ ܕܣܘܼܠܵܩܵܐ), feast of the Bride of the Ascension, celebrates Assyrian resistance to the invasion of Assyria by Tamerlane. The feast commemorates the women who died in battle helping the Assyrian soldiers. In the villages, the girls would be dressed as brides and would parade around the village asking for goods and gifts.
- Hano Qritho (Syriac: ܚܢܐ ܩܪܝܬܐ), a tradition that is celebrated by Assyrians from Tur Abdin and its surrounding area, typically on the last Sunday before Great Lent. Rooted in local legend, it commemorates a girl named Hano, who was promised as a sacrifice by her father, a king, after his victorious battle. Children create a doll representing Hano, singing traditional songs, while visiting homes to collect food like bulgur, eggs and roasted meat. The tradition is similar to Kalu d'Sulaqa.
- Rozune (Syriac: ܪܙܘܢܐ), annual religious culinary tradition in the Syriac Orthodox Church commemorating the Forty Martyrs of Sebaste. It is commemorated annually by Assyrians during Lent, and involves a piece of bread made into the shape of star with a coin hidden in it. The person who finds the coin is considered lucky for the year.
- Suboro (Syriac: ܣܘܒܪܐ), annual tradition among Western Assyrians of the SOC, namely involving the making of wristbands using white/red yarn. The wristbands represent the intertwined nature of the humanity (red) and the Resurrection of Jesus (white).
- Nusardil (Syriac: ܢܘܼܣܲܪܕܝܠ), commemorating the baptism of the Assyrians of Urmia by St. Thomas. Before Christianity, an ancient folk story told of Ishtar and Tammuz led to the religious celebration "Taklimtu", where every July the citizens would be blessed with holy water. It occurs after the seventh day of the Pentecost, marking the first day of summer. Assyrians celebrate by pouring water on each other to denote baptism.
- Sharra d'Mart Maryam, usually on August 15, a festival and feast celebrating St. Mary with games, food, and celebration.
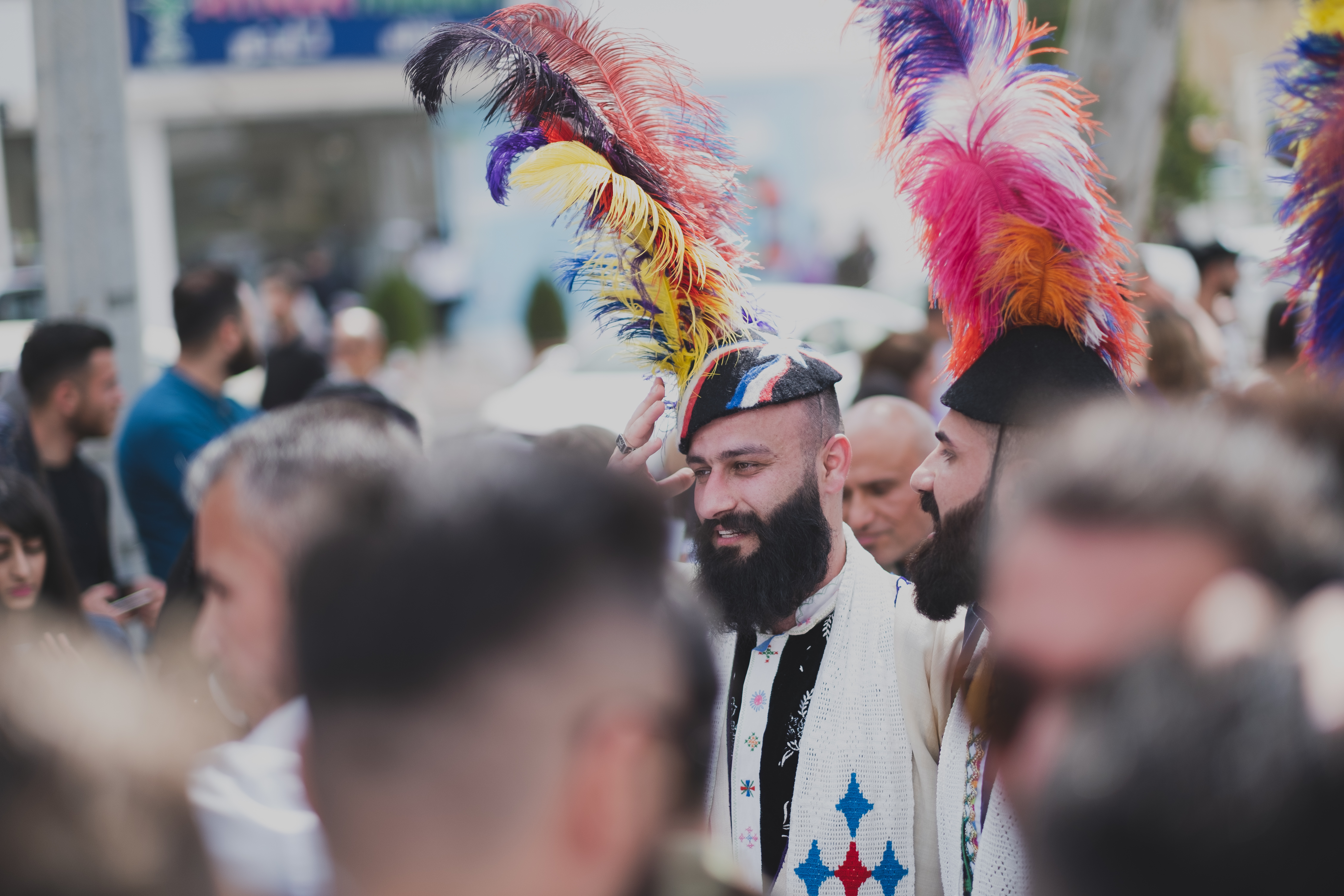
  The Assyrian New Year, Akitu festival (2019) in Duhok (Nohaadra)
  Other Sharras (special festivals) include: Sharra d'Mart Shmuni, Sharra d'Mar Shimon Bar-Sabbaye, Sharra d'Mar Mari, and Shara d'Mar Zaia, Mar Bishu, Mar Sawa, Mar Sliwa, Mar Odisho, and many more. Each town or city also have their own Sharras based on the patron saints of the churches, monasteries, or other holy sites in the settlement or nearby.
- Yoma d'Sah'deh (Syriac: ܝܘܡܐ ܕܣܗܕ̈ܐ, lit. 'Day of Martyrs' (Day of Martyrs), commemorating the thousands massacred in the Simele massacre and the hundreds of thousands massacred in the Assyrian genocide. It is commemorated annually on August 7.

Assyrians practice unique marriage ceremonies. The rituals performed during weddings are derived from many different elements from the past 3,000 years. An Assyrian wedding traditionally lasted a week. Today, weddings in the Assyrian homeland usually last 2–3 days. In the Assyrian diaspora they last 1–2 days.

=== Cuisine ===
Assyrian cuisine is similar to other Middle Eastern cuisines, and is rich in grains, meat, potato, cheese, bread and tomatoes. Typically, rice is served with every meal, with a stew poured over it. Tea is a popular drink, and there are several dishes of desserts, snacks, and beverages. Alcoholic drinks such as wine and wheat beer are organically produced and drunk. Assyrian cuisine is primarily identical to Iraqi/Mesopotamian cuisine, as well as being very similar to other Middle Eastern and Caucasian cuisines, as well as Greek cuisine, Levantine cuisine, Turkish cuisine, Iranian cuisine, Israeli cuisine, and Armenian cuisine, with most dishes being similar to the cuisines of the area in which those Assyrians live/originate from. It is rich in grains such as barley, meat, tomato, herbs, spices, cheese, and potato as well as herbs, fermented dairy products, and pickles.

=== Leadership ===
Leadership is largely decentralized and shaped by diaspora conditions. It is exercised through a combination of church authorities, political organizations, and cultural institutions. Within the Assyrian Church of the East, the Catholicos Patriarch Mar Awa III serves as the highest spiritual authority, guiding religious practice and representing the church globally. Similarly, the Chaldean Catholic Church is led by Patriarch Louis Raphaël I Sako, while the Syriac Orthodox Church is headed by Ignatius Aphrem II. Alongside religious leadership, secular advocacy groups and political parties such as the Assyrian Democratic Movement work to promote recognition, human rights, and autonomy for Assyrians, particularly in their historic homelands.

== Contributions ==
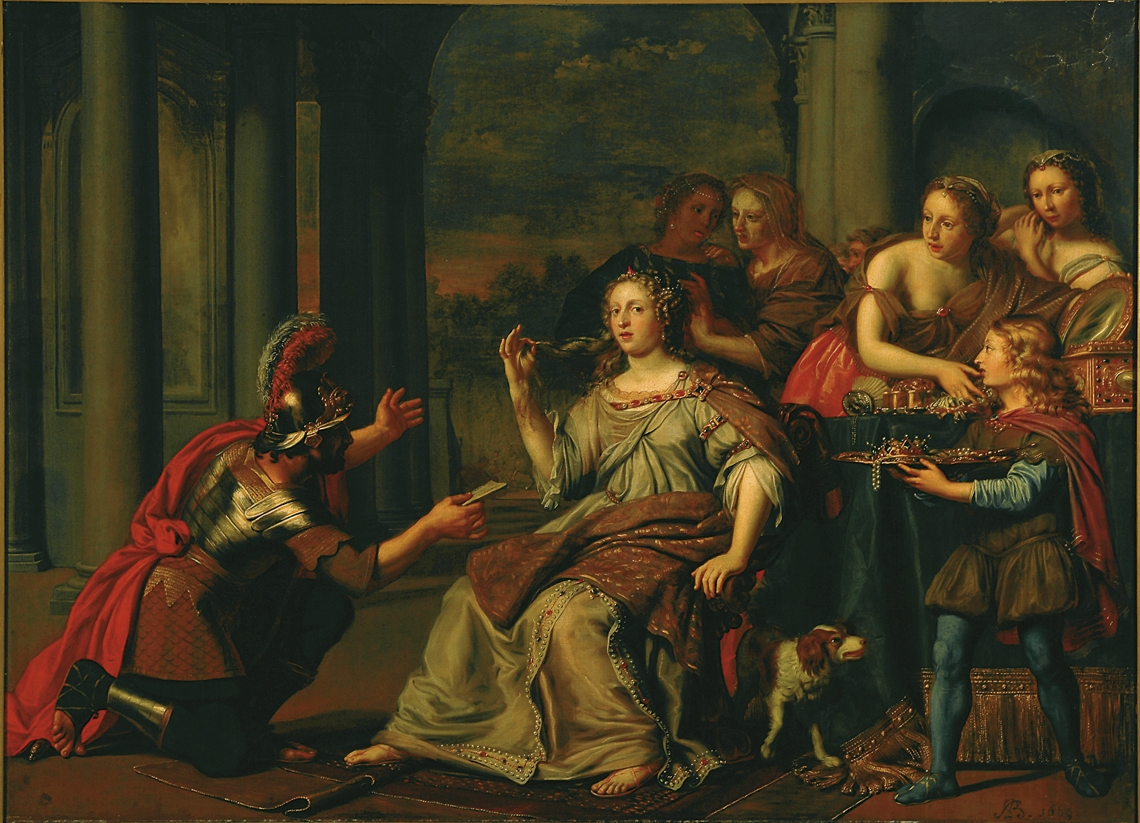
Assyrian Queen Sammu-Ramat and Semiramis c. 1669

The Assyrians are prominently featured in the Hebrew Bible and Christian Old Testament as a powerful and consequential people whose interactions with Israel and Judah shaped the region's history. Biblical narratives recount their military and administrative activity, describe the conquest and deportation of the northern Kingdom of Israel (2 Kings 17), and portray Nineveh as a major urban and religious center central to prophetic literature (notably Jonah's mission and Nahum's oracle.) Ancient Assyrian records are credited with providing the etymological origin for the biblical figure Ashkenaz. This historical term was later applied in medieval rabbinic literature to northern Europe, ultimately becoming the root designation for Ashkenazi Jews.

Advancements under the Assyrian Empire include the development of military technologies and siegecraft (including iron weapons, organized standing forces, chariot tactics, and battering-ram techniques), refining of state administration through road networks, relay stations, and extensive record-keeping on clay tablets, and engineering of large-scale irrigation and canal systems that improved agricultural productivity. Assyrian artisans and architects produced monumental palaces, ziggurats, intricate relief sculpture, stone and ivory carving, and compiled libraries (notably at Nineveh) that preserved legal, literary, and astronomical texts. During the Middle Ages, the Church of the East reached its greatest geographic extent, with missionaries establishing monasteries, schools, and Christian communities along the Silk Road as far as China (attested by the Nestorian Stele) and the Malabar Coast, contributing to the spread of Christianity alongside literacy, medicine, and Greco-Persian scholarship. The School of Nisibis emerged as one of the medieval world's leading centers of theology, philosophy, biblical exegesis, and medicine, influencing later models of higher education. Assyrian scholars made significant scientific and intellectual contributions, including Severus Sebokht, who introduced the Indian numeral system to the Middle East and advanced astronomical studies. The Syriac patriarch Ignatius Ni'matallah participated in Pope Gregory XIII's commission on calendar reform, contributing to the development of the Gregorian calendar, while Joseph Simon Assemani preserved and catalogued Syriac literary and historical traditions through works such as Bibliotheca Orientalis, which became foundational references for the study of Eastern Christianity in Europe. Since the 17th century, Assyrians have maintained Syriac Christian traditions through liturgical practice, manuscript production, and theological scholarship, particularly in monastic centres such as Mosul, Urmia, Qudshanis, and Mount Lebanon. Clergy and scholars also contributed to Syriac, Arabic, and Persian printing, education, and historical and literary preservation, helping sustain communal identity under Ottoman rule. The Sayfo and the resulting diaspora led to transnational institutions that preserved language and cultural heritage; contemporary Assyrians have contributed to academia, medicine, the arts, journalism, and politics and have advanced language revitalization, publication of literature, and revival of traditional music, dance, and crafts.

== Genetics ==
Late-20th-century DNA analysis conducted by Cavalli-Sforza, Paolo Menozzi and Alberto Piazza, "shows that Assyrians have a distinct genetic profile that distinguishes their population from any other population." Genetic analyses of the Assyrians of Persia demonstrated that they were "closed" with little "intermixture" with the Muslim Persian population and that an individual Assyrian's genetic makeup is relatively close to that of the Assyrian population as a whole. "The genetic data are compatible with historical data that religion played a major role in maintaining the Assyrian population's separate identity during the Christian era".

In a 2006 study of the Y chromosome DNA of six regional Armenian populations, including, for comparison, Assyrians and Syrians, researchers found that, "the Semitic populations (Assyrians and Syrians) are very distinct from each other according to both [comparative] axes. This difference is also supported by other methods of comparison points out the weak genetic affinity between the two populations with different historical destinies." A 2008 study on the genetics of "old ethnic groups in Mesopotamia", including 340 subjects from seven ethnic communities ("Assyrian, Jewish, Zoroastrian, Armenian, Turkmen, the Arab peoples in Iran, Iraq, and Kuwait") found that Assyrians were homogeneous with respect to all other ethnic groups sampled in the study, regardless of religious affiliation. Anthropologists indicate a great affinity between Assyrians and Caucasian Jews of the Akhaltsikhe group.

In a 2011 study focusing on the genetics of Marsh Arabs of Iraq, researchers identified Y chromosome haplotypes shared by Marsh Arabs, Iraqis, and Assyrians, "supporting a common local background." In a 2017 study focusing on the genetics of Northern Iraqi populations, it was found that Iraqi Assyrians and Iraqi Yazidis clustered together, but away from the other Northern Iraqi populations analyzed in the study, and largely in between the West Asian and Southeastern European populations. According to the study, "contemporary Assyrians and Yazidis from northern Iraq may in fact have a stronger continuity with the original genetic stock of the Mesopotamian people, which possibly provided the basis for the ethnogenesis of various subsequent Near Eastern populations".

A comprehensive study of the Assyrian diaspora in the United States sampled over 140 unrelated individuals tracing their ancestry back to historical villages across the Hakkari and Tur Abdin Mountains, the Mosul and Nineveh Plains, and the Urmia region. The project's outcomes demonstrated a powerful genetic continuity, showing that the majority of both maternal and paternal lineages originated squarely within ancient Mesopotamia and the South Caucasus. Notably, the study revealed that Assyrian maternal lineages completely lack sub-Saharan African, East Asian, and North Asian genetic markers. This distinguishes Assyrians from almost all other modern populations in the Near East, who typically possess these lineages at low frequencies due to later historical migrations. Furthermore, full sequencing of the participants' mitochondrial DNA successfully identified several entirely new maternal lineages previously unrecorded in global genetic literature, reinforcing the community's long-standing historical isolation.

=== Haplogroups ===
Y-DNA haplogroup J-M304 which originated from a geographical zone that includes northeastern Syria, northern Iraq and eastern Turkey from where it expanded to the rest of the Near East and North Africa has been found at 11% among Assyrians of Iran.

Haplogroup T-M184 [reported as K*] has been measured at 15.09% among Assyrians in Armenia. The haplogroup is frequent in Middle Eastern Jews, Georgians, Druze and Armenians. According to a 2011 study by Lashgary et al., R1b [reported as R*(xR1a)] has been measured at 40% among Assyrians in Iran, making it major haplogroup among Iranian Assyrians. Yet another DNA test comprising 48 Assyrian male subjects from Iran the northern R-M269 was also frequent at 29.2%. Lashgary et al. explain the presence of haplogroup R in Iranian Assyrians as well as in other Assyrian communities (~23%) as a consequence of mixing with Armenians and assimilation/integration of different peoples carrying haplogroup R, while explain its frequency as a result of genetic drift due to small population size and endogamy due to religious barriers.

Haplogroup J2 has been measured at 13.4%, which is commonly found in the Fertile Crescent, the Caucasus, Anatolia, Italy, coastal Mediterranean, and the Iranian plateau.

A broader evaluation of the pan-Assyrian genetic profile across various ancestral regions confirmed a highly distinct Mesopotamian character in paternal lineages. The cohort exhibited some of the highest frequencies ever reported in the Near East for Y-chromosome lines known as haplogroup T and the specific lineage J1xPage08.

== See also ==
- Assyria
- Assyrian diaspora
- Assyrian genocide (Sayfo)
- Assyrian homeland
- Assyrian independence movement
- Assyrian Universal Alliance
- The Last Assyrians
- List of Assyrians
- Mandaeans
- Mhallami
- Neo-Aramaic languages
- Proposals for Assyrian autonomy in Iraq
- Syriac Christianity
- Syriac language

== Sources ==
- Abdalla, Michael (1991). Walker, Harlan (ed.). The Way the Contemporary Western Assyrians take Food in the Middle East during Fasts and Church Holidays. Oxford Symposium on Food and Cookery. pp. 15–26. ISBN 9780907325468.
- Abdalla, Michael (2017). "The Term seyfo in Historical Perspective". The Assyrian Genocide: Cultural and Political Legacies. Vol. 1. London: Routledge. pp. 92–105. ISBN 978-1-138-28405-0.
- Aberbach, David (2003). Major Turning Points in Jewish Intellectual History. Palgrave Macmillan. ISBN 9781403937339.
- Aboona, Hirmis (2008). Assyrians, Kurds, and Ottomans: Intercommunal Relations on the Periphery of the Ottoman Empire. Amherst: Cambria Press. ISBN 978-1-60497-583-3. Archived from the original on 15 January 2023.
- Ainsworth, William F. (1841). "An Account of a Visit to the Chaldeans, Inhabiting Central Kurdistán; And of an Ascent of the Peak of Rowándiz (Ṭúr Sheïkhíwá) in Summer in 1840". The Journal of the Royal Geographical Society of London. 11: 21–76. doi:10.2307/1797632. JSTOR 1797632.
- Ainsworth, William F. (1842b). Travels and Researches in Asia Minor, Mesopotamia, Chaldea and Armenia. Vol. 2. London: John W. Parker.
- Andrade, Nathanael J. (2013). Syrian Identity in the Greco-Roman World. Cambridge: Cambridge University Press. ISBN 978-1-107-24456-6.
- Andrade, Nathanael J. (2014). "Assyrians, Syrians and the Greek Language in the late Hellenistic and Roman Imperial Periods". Journal of Near Eastern Studies. 73 (2): 299–317. doi:10.1086/677249. JSTOR 10.1086/677249. S2CID 163755644.
- Atman, Sabri (2018). "Assyrian genocide from a Gender Perspective". Sayfo 1915: An Anthology of Essays on the Genocide of Assyrians/Arameans during the First World War. Piscataway, NJ: Gorgias Press. pp. 215–232. ISBN 978-1-4632-0730-4.
- Atto, Naures (2011). Hostages in the Homeland, Orphans in the Diaspora: Identity Discourses Among the Assyrian/Syriac Elites in the European Diaspora. Leiden: Leiden University Press. ISBN 978-90-8728-148-9.
- Bae, Chul-hyun (2004). "Aramaic as a Lingua Franca During the Persian Empire (538-333 B.C.E.)". Journal of Universal Language. 5: 1–20. doi:10.22425/jul.2004.5.1.1. Archived from the original on 26 March 2021.
- Baum, Wilhelm; Winkler, Dietmar W. (2003). The Church of the East: A Concise History. London-New York: Routledge-Curzon. ISBN 978-1-134-43019-2.
- Baumer, Christoph (2006). The Church of the East: An Illustrated History of Assyrian Christianity. London-New York: Tauris. ISBN 978-1-84511-115-1.
- Begiç, H. Nurgül (2025). Traditional Turkish Handmade Dolls. Akademi Kültür / Academy Culture. p. 464. ISBN 978-625-95832-2-8.
- Beyer, Klaus (1986). The Aramaic Language: Its Distribution and Subdivisions. Göttingen: Vandenhoeck & Ruprecht. ISBN 9783525535738.
- Briquel-Chatonnet, Françoise (2019). "Writing Syriac: Manuscripts and Inscriptions". The Syriac World. London: Routledge. pp. 243–265. ISBN 978-1-138-89901-8.
- Bryce, Trevor R. (2009). The Routledge Handbook of the Peoples and Places of Ancient Western Asia: The Near East from the Early Bronze Age to the fall of the Persian Empire. London-New York: Routledge. ISBN 978-1-134-15907-9.
- Butts, Aaron M. (2017). "Assyrian Christians". A Companion to Assyria. Malden: John Wiley & Sons. pp. 599–612. doi:10.1002/9781118325216.CH32. ISBN 978-1-4443-3593-4. Archived from the original on 8 April 2022.
- Coakley, James F. (2011a). "Assyrians". Gorgias Encyclopedic Dictionary of the Syriac Heritage. Piscataway, NJ: Gorgias Press. p. 45. Archived from the original on 17 April 2022.
- Coakley, James F. (2011b). "Chaldeans". Gorgias Encyclopedic Dictionary of the Syriac Heritage. Piscataway, NJ: Gorgias Press. p. 93. Archived from the original on 1 August 2021.
- Courtois, Sebastien de (2004). The Forgotten Genocide: Eastern Christians, the Last Aramaeans. Piscataway, NJ: Gorgias Press. ISBN 978-1-59333-077-4.
- Crone, Patricia; Cook, Michael (1977). Hagarism: The Making of the Islamic World. Cambridge & New York: Cambridge University Press. p. 61. ISBN 0521211336.
- Davies, Benjamin (1872). A Compendious and Complete Hebrew and Chaldee Lexicon to the Old Testament. London: Asher.
- Donabed, Sargon G.; Mako, Shamiran (2009). "Ethno-cultural and Religious Identity of Syrian Orthodox Christians" (PDF). Chronos: Revue d'Histoire de l'Université de Balamand. 19: 69–111. Archived (PDF) from the original on 27 January 2021.
- Fiey, Jean Maurice (1965). "Assyriens ou Araméens?". L'Orient Syrien. 10: 141–160.
- Frahm, Eckart (2023). Assyria: The Rise and Fall of the World's First Empire. Bloomsbury Publishing. ISBN 9781526623706.
- Frye, Richard N. (1992). "Assyria and Syria: Synonyms". Journal of Near Eastern Studies. 51 (4): 281–285. doi:10.1086/373570. S2CID 161323237. Archived from the original on 5 February 2021.
- Frye, Richard N. (1997). "Assyria and Syria: Synonyms" (PDF). Journal of Assyrian Academic Studies. 11 (2): 30–36. Archived from the original (PDF) on 13 July 2020.
- Frazee, Charles A. (2006) [1983]. Catholics and Sultans: The Church and the Ottoman Empire 1453–1923. Cambridge: Cambridge University Press. ISBN 978-0-521-02700-7. Archived from the original on 15 January 2023.
- Fürst, Julius (1867). A Hebrew & Chaldee Lexicon to the Old Testament: With an Introduction Giving a Short History of Hebrew Lexicography. London: Williams & Norgate.
- Gallagher, Edmon L. (2012). Hebrew Scripture in Patristic Biblical Theory: Canon, Language, Text. Leiden-Boston: Brill. ISBN 978-90-04-22802-3.
- Gaunt, David; Beṯ-Şawoce, Jan; Donef, Racho (2006). Massacres, Resistance, Protectors: Muslim-Christian Relations in Eastern Anatolia During World War I. Piscataway, NJ: Gorgias Press. ISBN 978-1-59333-301-0.
- Gaunt, David (2015). "The Complexity of the Assyrian Genocide". Genocide Studies International. 9 (1): 83–103. doi:10.3138/gsi.9.1.05. ISSN 2291-1847.
- Gaunt, David; Atto, Naures; Barthoma, Soner O. (2017). "Introduction: Contextualizing the Sayfo in the First World War". Let Them Not Return: Sayfo – The Genocide Against the Assyrian, Syriac, and Chaldean Christians in the Ottoman Empire. Berghahn Books. pp. 1–32. ISBN 978-1-78533-499-3.
- Gesenius, Wilhelm; Prideaux-Tregelles, Samuel (1859). Gesenius's Hebrew and Chaldee Lexicon to the Old Testament Scriptures. London: Bagster.
- Gzella, Holger (2015). A Cultural History of Aramaic: From the Beginnings to the Advent of Islam. Leiden-Boston: Brill. ISBN 978-90-04-28510-1.
- Hanish, Shak (2015). "Assyrians". Native Peoples of the World: An Encyclopedia of Groups, Cultures and Contemporary Issues. London-New York: Routledge. p. 517. ISBN 978-1-317-46400-6.
- Healey, John F. (2010). "The Church Across the Border: The Church of the East and its Chaldean Branch". Eastern Christianity in the Modern Middle East. London-New York: Routledge. pp. 41–55. ISBN 978-1-135-19371-3.
- Healy, Mark (2023). The Ancient Assyrians: Empire and Army, 883–612 BC. Osprey Publishing. ISBN 9781472848109.
- Heinrichs, Wolfhart, ed. (1990). Studies in Neo-Aramaic. Atlanta: Scholars Press. ISBN 978-1-55540-430-7.
- Heinrichs, Wolfhart (1993). "The Modern Assyrians - Name and Nation". Semitica: Serta philologica Constantino Tsereteli dicata. Torino: Zamorani. pp. 99–114. ISBN 978-88-7158-024-1.
- Joseph, John B. (1997). "Assyria and Syria: Synonyms?" (PDF). Journal of Assyrian Academic Studies. 11 (2): 37–43. Archived from the original (PDF) on 15 July 2020.
- Joseph, John B. (2000). The Modern Assyrians of the Middle East: A History of Their Encounter with Western Christian Missions, Archaeologists, and Colonial Powers. Leiden: Brill. ISBN 90-04-11641-9.
- Laing-Marshall, Andrea (2005). "Assyrians". Encyclopedia of the World's Minorities. Vol. 1. New York-London: Routledge. pp. 149–150. ISBN 978-1-135-19388-1. Archived from the original on 15 January 2023.
- Layard, Austen H. (1849a). Nineveh and its Remains: With an Account of a Visit to the Chaldean Christians of Kurdistan. Vol. 1. London: John Murray.
- Layard, Austen H. (1849b). Nineveh and its Remains: With an Account of a Visit to the Chaldean Christians of Kurdistan. Vol. 2. London: John Murray.
- Lipiński, Edward (2000). The Aramaeans: Their Ancient History, Culture, Religion. Leuven: Peeters Publishers. ISBN 978-90-429-0859-8.
- Macuch, Rudolf (1976). Geschichte der spät- und neusyrischen Literatur. Berlin-New York: Walter de Gruyter. ISBN 978-3-11-005959-5.
- Millar, Fergus (1967). The Roman Empire and Its Neighbours. New York: Delacorte Press. ISBN 978-0-440-01769-1.
- Mooken, Aprem (2003). The History of the Assyrian Church of the East in the Twentieth Century. Kottayam: St. Ephrem Ecumenical Research Institute.
- Murre van den Berg, Heleen (2015). "Classical Syriac and the Syriac Churches: A Twentieth-Century History". Syriac Encounters: Papers from the Sixth North American Syriac Symposium. Louvain: Peeters Publishers. pp. 119–148. ISBN 978-90-429-3046-9.
- Nisan, Mordechai (2002). Minorities in the Middle East: A History of Struggle and Self-Expression (2nd ed.). Jefferson, NC: McFarland. ISBN 978-0-7864-5133-3.
- O'Mahony, Anthony (2006). "Syriac Christianity in the modern Middle East". The Cambridge History of Christianity: Eastern Christianity. Vol. 5. Cambridge: Cambridge University Press. pp. 511–536. ISBN 978-0-521-81113-2.
- Parpola, Simo (2004). "National and Ethnic Identity in the Neo-Assyrian Empire and Assyrian Identity in Post-Empire Times" (PDF). Journal of Assyrian Academic Studies. 18 (2): 5–22. Archived from the original (PDF) on 28 November 2007.
- Rollinger, Robert (2006a). "Assyrios, Syrios, Syros und Leukosyros". Die Welt des Orients. 36: 72–82. JSTOR 25684050.
- Rollinger, Robert (2006b). "The Terms Assyria and Syria Again" (PDF). Journal of Near Eastern Studies. 65 (4): 283–287. doi:10.1086/511103. S2CID 162760021. Archived (PDF) from the original on 10 October 2017.
- Schniedewind, William M. (2002). "The Rise of the Aramean States". Mesopotamia and the Bible: Comparative Explorations. London: Sheffield Academic Press. pp. 276–287. ISBN 978-0-567-08231-2.
- Southgate, Horatio (1840). Narrative of a Tour Through Armenia, Kurdistan, Persia and Mesopotamia. Vol. 2. London: Tilt and Bogue.
- Southgate, Horatio (1842). "Report of a Visit of the Rev. H. Southgate to the Syrian Church of Mesopotamia, 1841". The Spirit of Missions. 7: 163–174, 246–251, 276–280.
- Southgate, Horatio (1844). Narrative of a Visit to the Syrian (Jacobite) Church of Mesopotamia. New York: Appleton.
- Tekoğlu, Recai; Lemaire, André; İpek, İsmet; Tosun, Kazım (2000). "La bilingue royale louvito-phénicienne de Çineköy" (PDF). Comptes rendus des séances de l'Académie des Inscriptions et Belles-Lettres. 144 (3): 961–1007.
- Tezel, Aziz (2003). Comparative Etymological Studies in the Western Neo-Syriac (Ṭūrōyo) Lexicon: With Special Reference to Homonyms, Related Words and Borrowings with Cultural Signification. Uppsala: Uppsala University Library. ISBN 978-91-554-5555-2.
- Tisserant, Eugène (1931). "L'Église nestorienne". Dictionnaire de théologie catholique. Vol. 11. Paris: Letouzey et Ané. pp. 157–323.
- Travis, Hannibal (2010) [2007]. Genocide in the Middle East: The Ottoman Empire, Iraq, and Sudan. Durham, NC: Carolina Academic Press. pp. 237–77, 293–294. ISBN 978-1-59460-436-2.
- Üngör, Uğur Ümit (2011). The Making of Modern Turkey: Nation and State in Eastern Anatolia, 1913–1950. Oxford University Press. ISBN 978-0-19-965522-9.
- Winkler, Dietmar W. (2019). "The Syriac Church Denominations: An Overview". The Syriac World. London: Routledge. pp. 119–133. ISBN 978-1-138-89901-8.
- Yacoub, Joseph (2016). Year of the Sword: The Assyrian Christian Genocide: A History. New York: Oxford University Press. ISBN 978-0-19-063346-2.
- Yana, George V. (2008). Ancient and Modern Assyrians: A Scientific Analysis. Philadelphia: Xlibris Corporation. ISBN 978-1-4653-1629-5.
