= Easter sprinkling =

Easter sprinkling may refer to:

- Easter Asperges, the sprinkling of Easter water during the Easter Vigil or Easter Sunday Mass tied with the renewal of Christian baptismal vows
- Easter sprinkling in Hungary, a folk tradition associated with the celebration of Easter in that country
