= Zagmuk =

Ancient Mesopotamian New Year festival

Zagmuk (Sumerian: 𒍠 𒈬, romanized: ZAG.MU, lit. 'New Year'), which literally means "beginning of the year", is an ancient Mesopotamian festival celebrating the New Year. The feast fell in March or April, the beginning of the Mesopotamian year, and lasted about 12 days. According to the Scottish anthropologist Sir James George Frazer in the second edition of his study "The Golden Bough" (iii. 181, 182.), the date of the festivity of the beardless one was "the first day of the first month, which in the most ancient Persian calendar corresponds to March, so that the date of the ceremony agrees with that of the Babylonian New Year Festival of Zakmuk". It celebrates the triumph of Marduk, the patron deity of Babylon, over the forces of Chaos, symbolized in later times by Tiamat. The battle between Marduk and Chaos lasts 12 days, as does the festival of Zagmuk. In Uruk the festival was associated with the god An, the Sumerian god of the night sky. Both are essentially equivalent in all respects to the Akkadian "Akitu" festival. In some variations, Marduk is slain by Tiamat on the winter solstice and resurrected on the vernal equinox.

In Babylon, the battle was acted out at the royal court with the king playing Marduk, and his son-rescuer as Nabu, the god of writing. Once freed from the powers of the underworld, the king would enact the rite of hieros gamos on the 10th day of the ceremony. During this rite, the king (or En, as he was known in Sumer) would perform sexual intercourse with his spouse, normally a high priestess who had been chosen from among the naditum, a special class of priestesses who had taken a vow not of celibacy precisely, but of a refusal to bear children. The high priestess was known as the entu, and her ritual act of intercourse with the king was thought to regenerate the cosmos through a reenactment of the primordial coupling of the cosmic parents An and Ki, who had brought the world into being at the dawn of Time. If an eclipse of the sun fell on any of the 12 days of the ceremony, a substitute for the king was put in his place, since it was thought that any evils which might have befallen the king would accrue to the substitute instead. On the last day of the festival, the king was slain so that he could battle at Marduk's side. To spare their king, Mesopotamians often used a mock king, played by a criminal who was anointed as king before the start of Zagmuk, and killed on the last day.

== See also ==
- Akitu
- Nowruz
- Feast of Wine
- Ugaritic vintage rites
