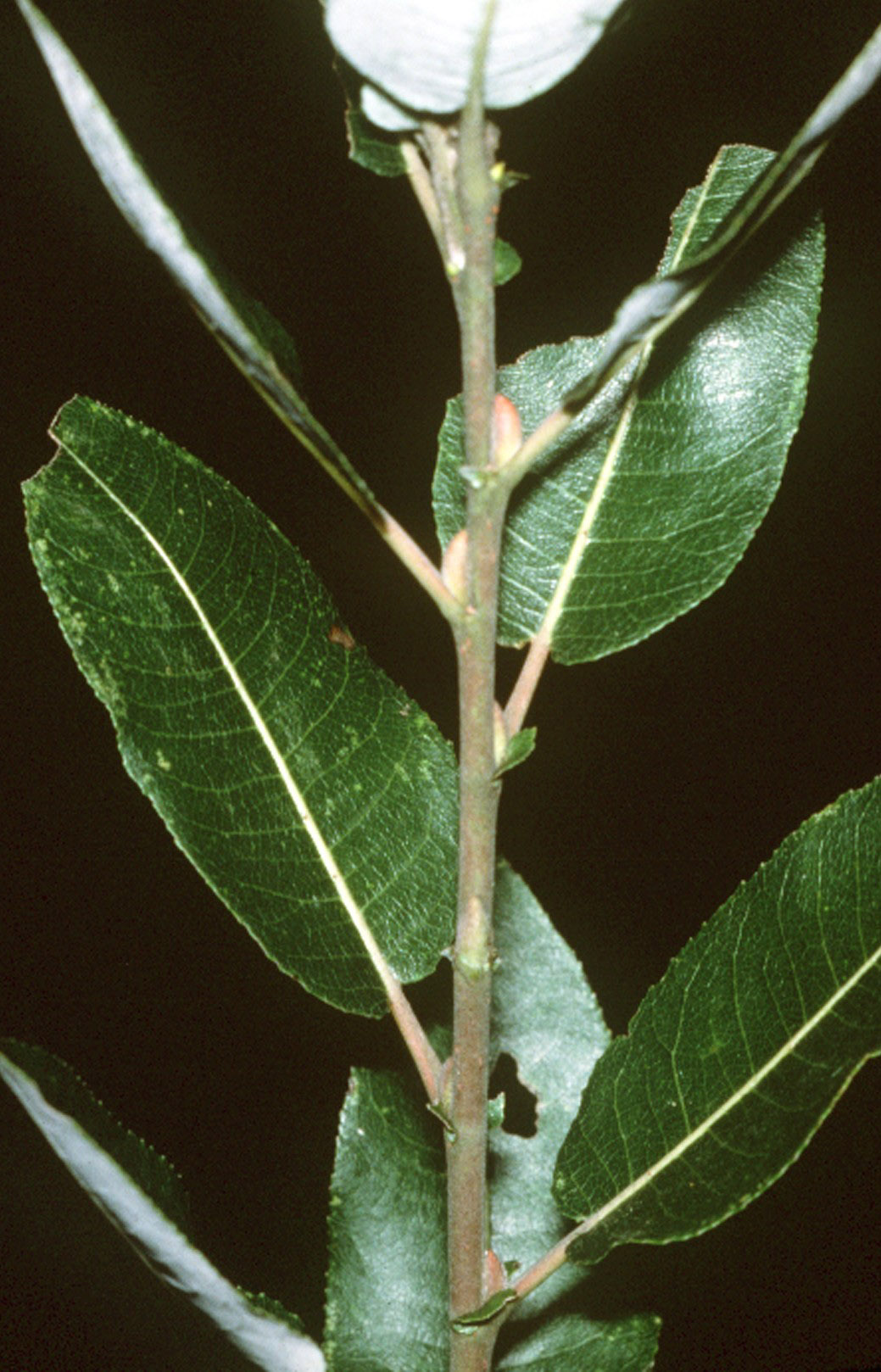
- Shoot with leaves

Conservation status
- Least Concern (IUCN 3.1)

Scientific classification
- Kingdom: Plantae
- Clade: Tracheophytes
- Clade: Angiosperms
- Clade: Eudicots
- Clade: Rosids
- Order: Malpighiales
- Family: Salicaceae
- Genus: Salix
- Species: S. discolor

Binomial name
- Salix discolor Muhl.
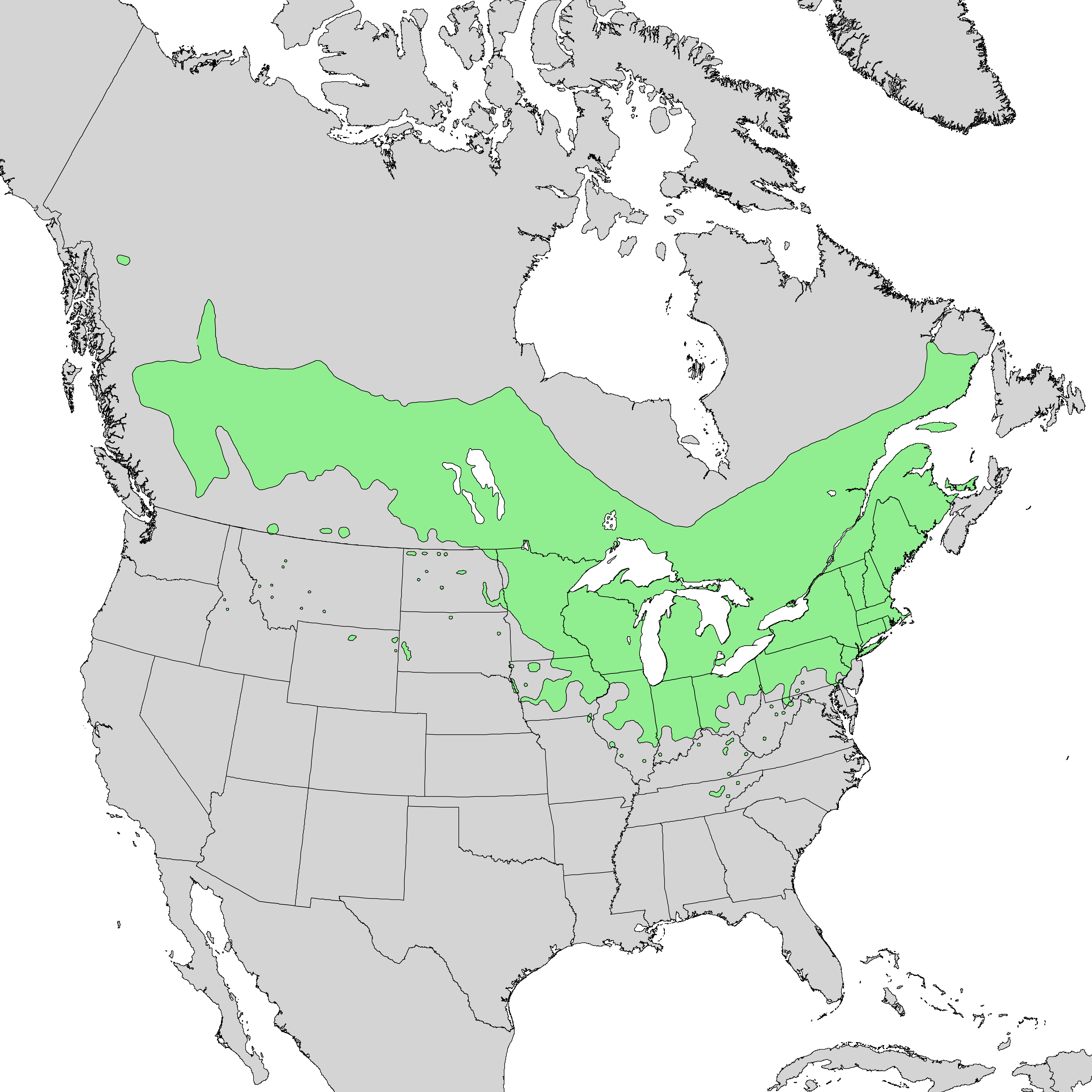
- Natural range of Salix discolor

= Salix discolor =

Species of plant

Salix discolor, the American pussy willow or glaucous willow, is a species of willow native to North America, one of two species commonly called pussy willow.

It is native to the vast reaches of Alaska as well as the northern forests and wetlands of Canada (British Columbia east to Newfoundland), and is also found in the northern portions of the contiguous United States (Washington east to Maine, and south to Maryland).

It is a weak-wooded deciduous shrub or small tree growing to 6 m (20 ft) tall, with brown shoots. The leaves are oval, 3–14 cm long and 1–3.5 cm broad, green above and downy grey-white beneath.

The flowers are soft silky silvery catkins, borne in early spring before the new leaves appear, with the male and female catkins on different plants (dioecious); the male catkins mature yellow at pollen release.

The fruit is a small capsule 7–12 mm long containing numerous minute seeds embedded in cottony down.

== Cultivation and uses ==
Like other willows, it contains salicin, and was used by Native Americans as a painkiller.

As with the closely related Salix caprea (European pussy willow), it is also often grown for cut flowers.

The flowering shoots are used for spring religious decoration on Palm Sunday, as a replacement for palm branches, which do not grow in much of North America. Various Eastern European peoples carry pussy willows on Palm Sunday instead of palm branches. This custom was brought to North America by Ukrainian Orthodox Church, Romanian Orthodox, Russian Orthodox, Ruthenian Catholic, Ukrainian Catholic, Kashubian Catholic and Polish Catholic émigrés. Sometimes, on Palm Sunday, they will bless both palms and pussy willows in church. The branches will often be preserved throughout the year in the family's icon corner.

Pussy willow also plays a prominent role in Polish Dyngus Day (Easter Monday) observances, continued also among Polish-Americans.

== Ecology ==
Male flowers provide pollen for bees, and it is a popular larval host, supporting the Acadian hairstreak, black-waved flannel moth, cecropia moth, Compton's tortoiseshell, cynthia moth, dreamy duskywing, eastern tiger swallowtail, elm sphinx, imperial moth, Io moth, modest sphinx, mourning cloak, polyphemus moth, promethea moth, red-spotted purple, small-eyed sphinx, twin-spotted sphinx, and viceroy.

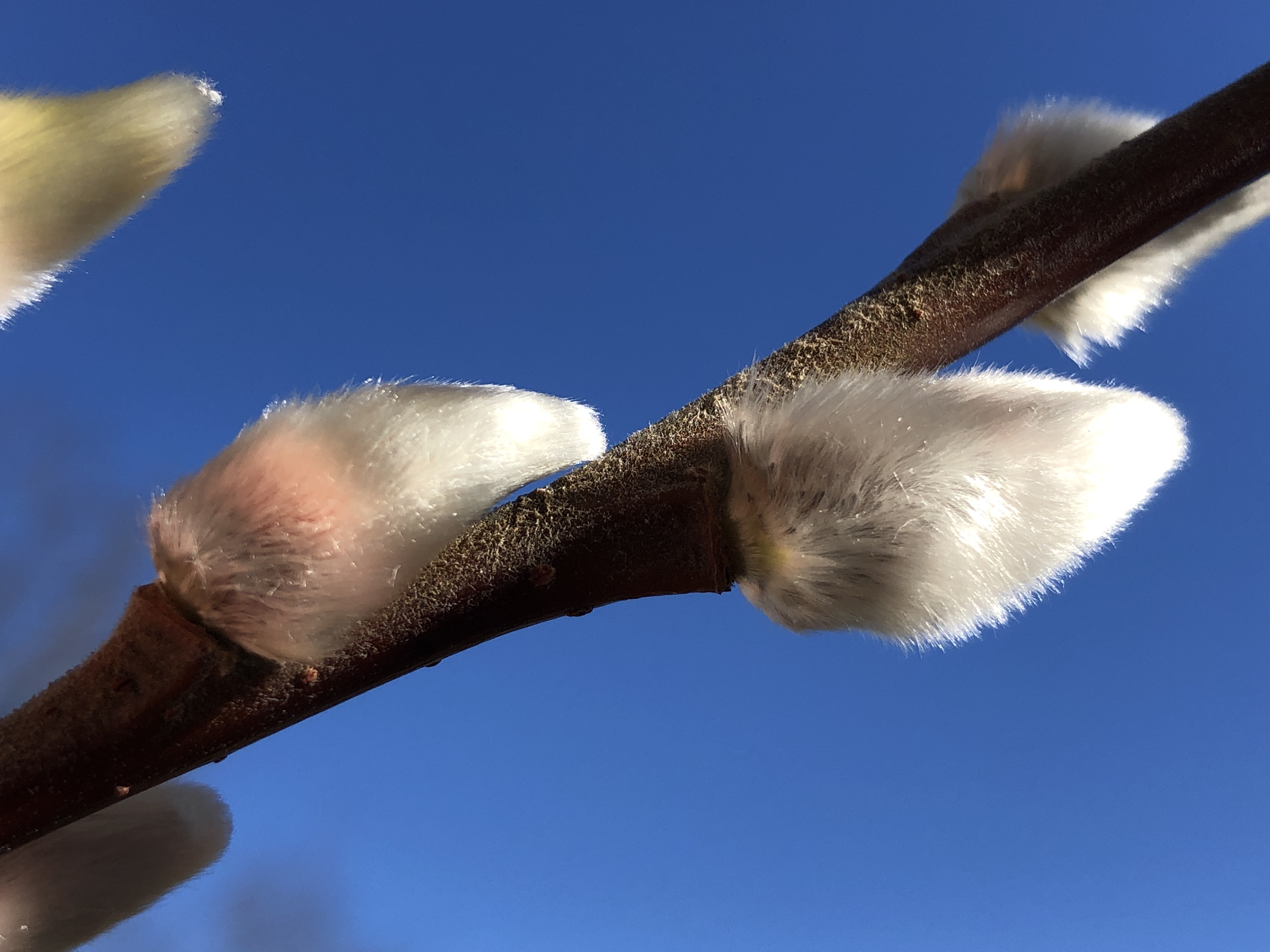
Branch with catkins in early spring

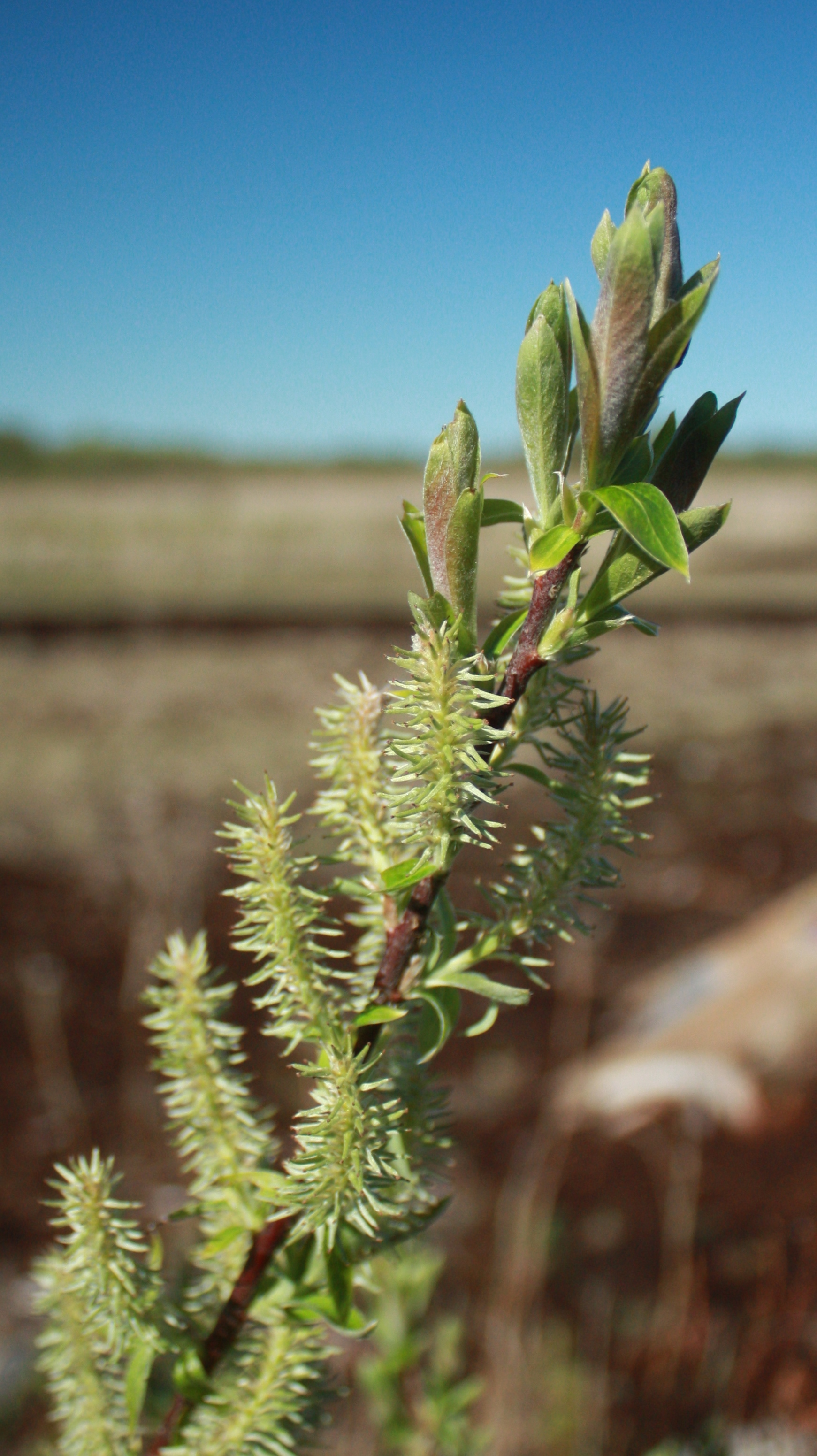
Female flowers

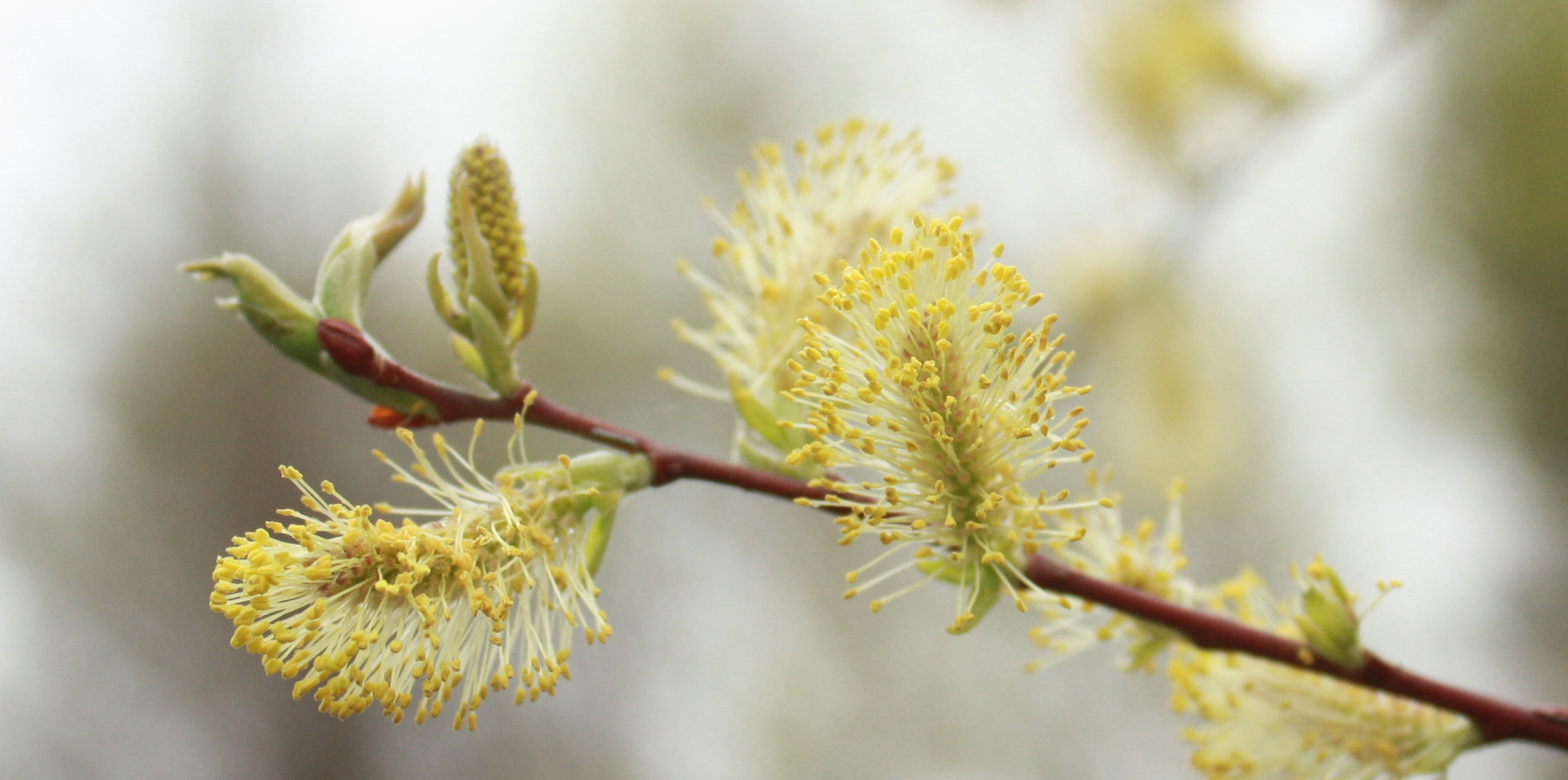
Male flowers
