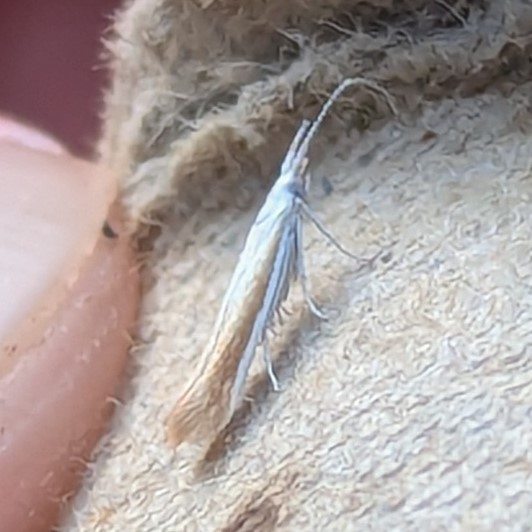

Scientific classification
- Kingdom: Animalia
- Phylum: Arthropoda
- Class: Insecta
- Order: Lepidoptera
- Family: Coleophoridae
- Genus: Coleophora
- Species: C. kearfottella

Binomial name
- Coleophora kearfottella Barnes & Busck, 1920

= Coleophora kearfottella =

Species of moth

Coleophora kearfottella is a species of moth in the family Coleophoridae that was first described by William Barnes and August Busck in 1920. It is found in North America, including New Jersey, Ontario, Quebec and Prince Edward Island.

The larvae feed on the leaves of Salix (including Salix bebbiana and Salix discolor) and Ribes species. They create a lobe case.
