= Assyrian calendar =

Solar calendar used by modern Assyrian people

The Assyrian calendar (Syriac: ܣܘܼܪܓܵܕ݂ܵܐ ܐܵܬ݂ܘܿܪܵܝܵܐ, romanized: sūrgāḏā ʾĀṯōrāyā) is a solar calendar used by modern Assyrian people.

== History ==
Historically and also in some sources in the modern day, Assyrians dated their calendar according to the Seleucid era (Syriac: ܕܝܲܘܢܵܝܹ̈ܐ, romanized: d-yawnāyē, lit. 'of the Greeks'), beginning on the first day of Tešrīn Qḏīm in 312 BC.

The modern Assyrian calendar, however, uses a different reckoning: 4750 BC was set as its first year in the 1950s, based on a series of articles published in the Assyrian nationalist magazine Gilgamesh; the first came in 1952 and written by Nimrod Simono and dealt with the Akitu festival, then an article by Jean Alkhas in 1955 (April, issue 34) fixed the year 4750 BC as the starting point. Alkhas referenced his information to a French archaeologist, whom he did not name, as stating that a cuneiform tablet dating to 4750 BC mentioned the year of the calming of the great flood and beginning of life.

== New year ==
The year begins with the first sight of Spring. In the Julian calendar, the vernal equinox moved gradually away from 21 March. The Gregorian calendar reform restored the vernal equinox to its original date, but since the festival was by now tied to the date, not the astronomical event, Kha b-Nisan remains fixed at 21 March in the Julian reckoning, corresponding to 1 April in the Gregorian calendar. and the calendar adopted by the ancient Assyrians had the month "Nisan" at the beginning of the calendar lending to the term "Kha b-Nisan", or the "first of Nisan".

== Months ==
Assyrian calendar
Season	Syriac	Transliteration	Arabic Julian/Gregorian equivalent (see Arabic names of Gregorian months § Iraq and the Levant)	Hebrew calendar equivalent	English Julian/Gregorian equivalent
Spring	ܐܵܕܲܪ	ʾĀḏar	آذَار (ʾĀḏār)	אֲדָר (ʾĂḏār)	March
Spring	ܢܝܼܣܵܢ	Nīsān	نِيسَان (Nīsān) or نَيْسَان (Naysān)	נִיסָן (Nīsān)	April
Spring	ܐܝܼܵܪ	ʾĪyār	أَيَّار (ʾAyyār)	אִיָּר (ʾĪyyār)	May
Summer	ܚܙܝܼܪܵܢ	Ḥzīrān	حَزِيرَان (Ḥazīrān) or حُزَيْرَان (Ḥuzayrān)	סִיוָן (Sīwān)	June
Summer	ܬܲܡܘܼܙ	Tammūz	تَمُّوز (Tammūz)	תַּמּוּז (Tammūz)	July
Summer	ܐܵܒ\ܛܲܒܵܚ	ʾĀb/Ṭabbāḥ	آب (ʾĀb)	אָב (ʾĀḇ)	August
Autumn	ܐܝܼܠܘܼܠ	ʾĪlūl	أَيْلُول (ʾAylūl)	אֱלוּל (ʾĔlūl)	September
Autumn	ܬܸܫܪܝܼܢ ܐ	Tešrīn Qḏīm	تِشْرِين ٱلْأَوَّل (Tišrīn al-ʾAwwal)	תִּשׁרִי (Tišrī)	October
Autumn	ܬܸܫܪܝܼܢ ܒ	Tešrīn [ʾ]Ḥrāy	تِشْرِين ٱلثَّانِي (Tišrīn aṯ-Ṯānī)	מַרְחֶשְׁוָן (Marḥešwān)	November
Winter	ܟܵܢܘܿܢ ܐ	Kānōn Qḏīm	كَانُون ٱلْأَوَّل (Kānūn al-ʾAwwal)	כִּסְלֵו (Kislēw)	December
Winter	ܟܵܢܘܿܢ ܒ	Kānōn [ʾ]Ḥrāy	كَانُون ٱلثَّانِي (Kānūn aṯ-Ṯānī)	טֵבֵת (Ṭēḇēṯ)	January
Winter	ܫܒ݂ܵܛ	Šḇāṭ	شُبَاط (Šubāṭ)	שְׁבָט (Šḇāṭ)	February

== See also ==
- Babylonian calendar
- Hebrew calendar
- Islamic calendar
- Kha b-Nisan
- Mandaean calendar
- Persian calendar
- Solar Hijri calendar
- Zoroastrian calendar
