= Easter sprinkling in Hungary =

Folk tradition

Easter sprinkling in Hungary (Hungarian: húsvéti locsolkodás or locsolás) is an Easter folk tradition.

Among Hungarians, according to this custom, on Easter Monday (Hungarian: Vízbevető Hétfő; lit. 'Water Plunge Monday') boys sprinkle water on girls they know. Historically, it was common practice to drench girls with buckets of water or even throw them into watering troughs. Today, this more extreme form of sprinkling is mainly preserved in rural or small-town settings, especially among groups dedicated to maintaining traditional customs. In modern times, a gentler version has become widespread. After reciting a short "sprinkling poem", boys lightly spray girls with perfume, though in more humorous cases, tools such as flower sprayers, soda siphons, or garden hoses may still be used. In return, the boys are rewarded with decorated red eggs, often intricately painted or dyed, known as Easter eggs.

A similar tradition also exists in Poland, called Śmigus-dyngus, and in Slovakia, called oblievačka.

== Folk tradition ==
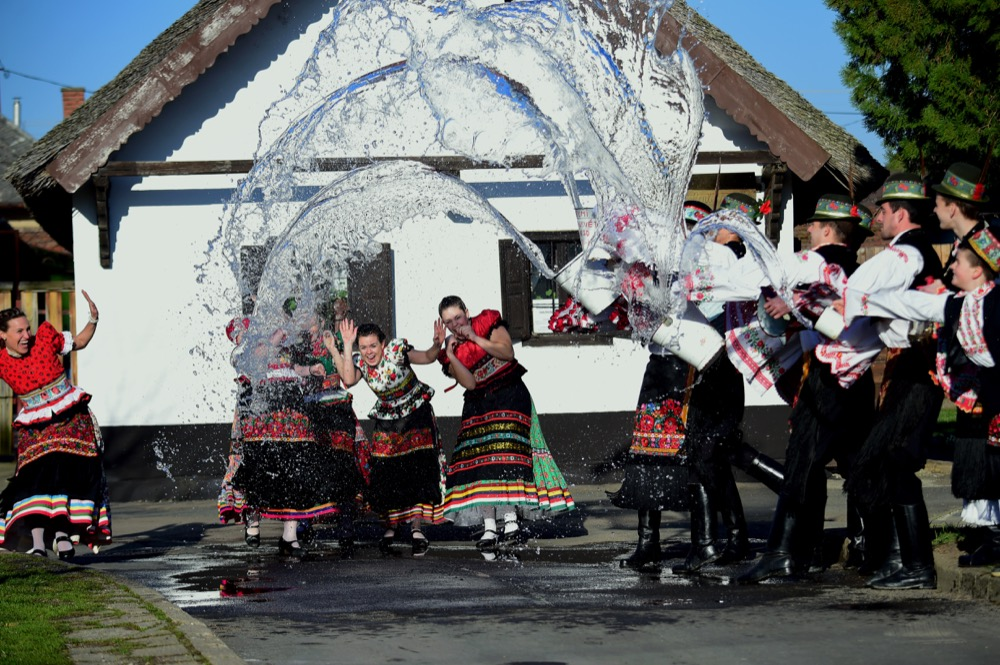
Locsolkodás in Matyóföld region of Hungary

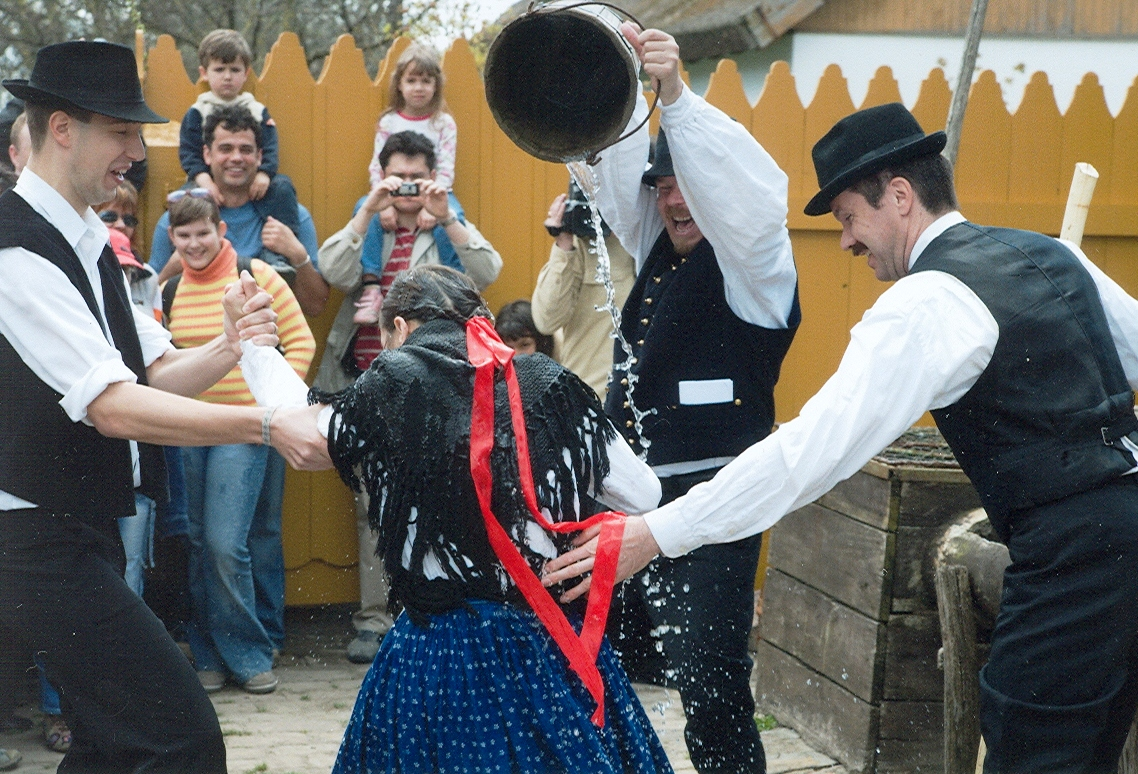
Getting soaked in Hungary on Easter Monday

Among Hungarians in Hungary and in the Carpathian Basin, this Easter Monday custom is known as locsolkodás (sprinkling). It is common between continental Hungarians and Hungarian Americans. Traditionally, young men splashed young women with a bucket of cold water (usually at dawn, when the girls were still in bed). Fifty years ago, it was still common to see girls thrown into the trough, dressed in their finest for the noble occasion. In return, women are expected to provide men with either painted eggs or a drink of palinka. Considered a rural form of flirting, the practice is no longer common.

There is an interesting parallel in the name of the tradition, locsolás or öntözés, which means "watering" because the girl is allegorically compared to a budding flower.

Since the Interwar period, perfume is sprayed instead of water, and young boys often organise musical parades for the ritual, but sometimes water guns are also used.

It was one of the most important folk festivals in Hungary. It was a festival of love, where man came together with their ladies. It played an important role in growing up, because the young people only went to the neighbourhood to celebrate, while the stags (legény) went as a group. In Hungary, it was customary to water not only the female members of the family, but also the young girls of the village, showing attraction. Often, before the locsolás, they ate szalonna and scrambled eggs and threw the eggshells under the window of a girl they were offended by.

Sometimes the locsolkodás is done in costumes. In Galgamácsa for example, the youth would wear white masks while circle dancing (maskurázás), though this tradition is more common on Shrove Tuesday.

=== Locsolóvers poem ===
The "locsolóvers", an often humorous short poem in connection with locsolkodás, has developed into a separate genre. There are many well-known poems the man is expected to know, but improvisation is also common. It is usually recited before the locsolás in which the girl is asked to allow the locsolás or to be given a kiss.

The text of the poem was often a playful threat.

Ajtó megett állok
Piros tojást várok,
Ha nem adtok lányok
Mind a kútba hánylak.

Which roughly translates to:

I stand at the door
Waiting for Red eggs,
If you don't give them to me, girls
I'll throw you all in the well.

=== Gifts ===
While chocolate eggs from the West are more common in Budapest, most towns still paint their eggs. Children build a nest for the Easter bunny to lay chocolate eggs in.

It is common for young boys to gamble with the eggs they receive. There were many forms of this, one of the most common being to roll your own egg and try to break the other's. The locsolkodó (sprinklers) usually got 8-9 eggs per house. Alongside the eggs, they were offered ham, aspic, kalach, and wine. In the evening they had a ball. When these eggs were cooked in the juices of consecrated ham, it was called kókonya.

The eggs were given to escape the locsolás or to thank it. These were also sometimes hanged on the Hajnalfa to protect from hex. On the third day of Easter, the girls water the boys. Gifts were also traditionally given this day.

"It would spoil the will to work of a young bride, girl or boy, for a whole year, if her husband or her mother did not buy her new boots for Easter, and for a girl, mostly red or yellow."

These red boots have also become a symbol of the festivity. Within the family, it was mostly given by the godparents. The girls only wore it inside the church, walking barefoot there and back so it would never get muddy.

=== Hajnalfa ===
Making the Hajnalfa (Dawn Tree) is also an important festive ritual. The boys bring a tree to the girl's garden (or use an existing tree) and decorate it like a Christmas tree (karácsonyfa) or a Maypole (Májusfa), usually with ribbons. It was considered a disgrace if there was no tree in the morning. A dawn tree meant that the occupant of the house was to undergo locsolás. It was also called Jakob-fa after since in Christian tradition the day was also called Philip-Jakob's day (Hungarian: Fülöp-Jakob napja).

=== Vesszőzés ===
Vesszőzés or sibálás is a custom similar to šibať. In Hungary, it was believed that a whip made from willow twigs would make girls healthy. After it, the girls would give the boys a bundle or a bokreta and treat them to wine. Common shapes are kígyóhátú ("snakesback"), gömbölyű ("rounded") and négyszögletes ("rectangular"), which can be made anywhere from 4 to 9 strands. In Hungary, the pussy willow was also thought to have magical properties, such as hail divination and lightning protection, but it was not associated with the holiday.

== See also ==
- Easter Asperges
- Śmigus-dyngus
- Nusardil
