= Akitu =

Spring festival in ancient Mesopotamia

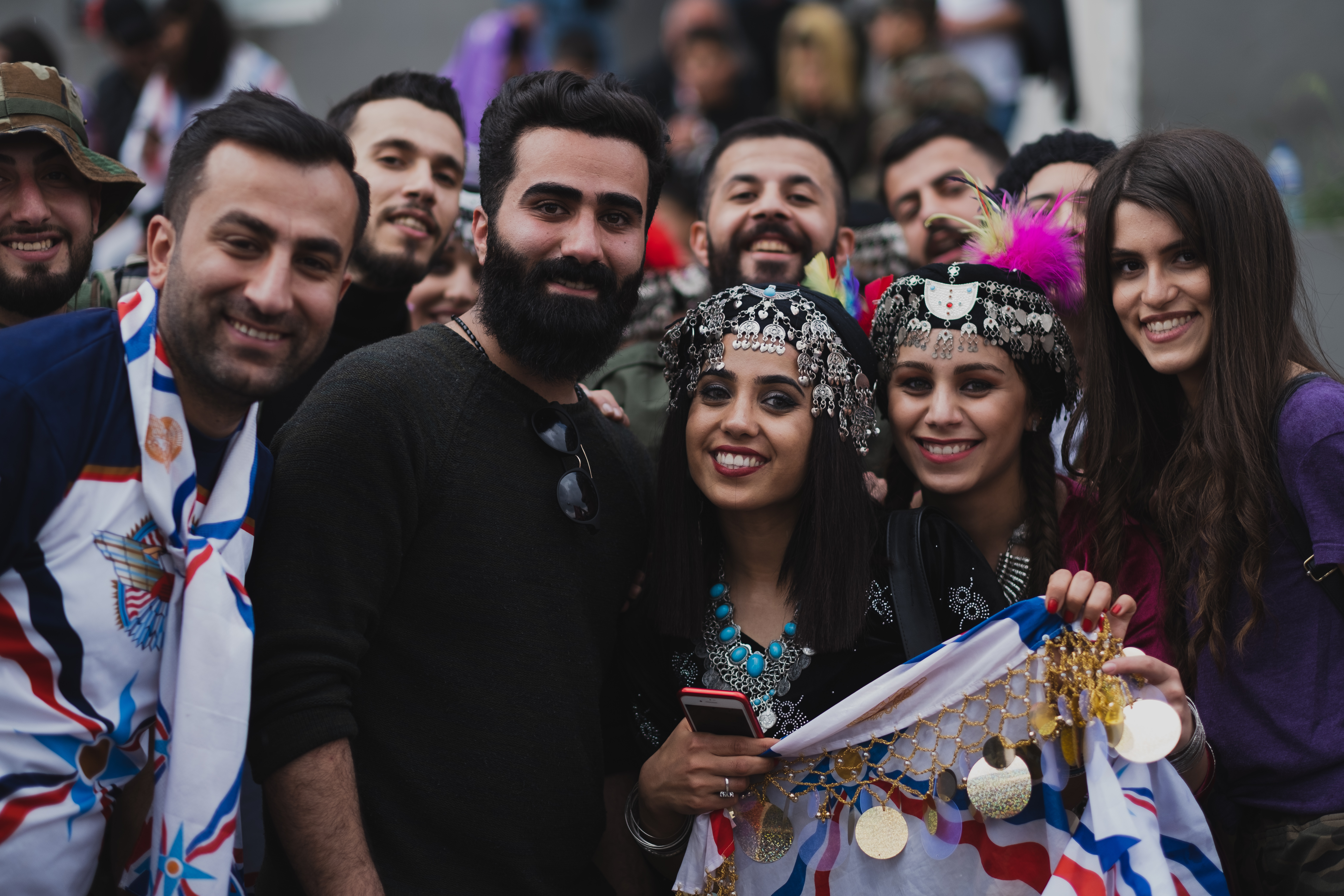
- Assyrians celebrating Akitu year 6769 Nisanu (April) 1st 2019) in Nohadra (Duhok), Iraq
- Type: National, ethnic
- Significance: New Year holiday, Easter
- Date: 1 April; varies between April 1–4
- Frequency: Annual

Akitu or Akitum (Sumerian: 𒀉𒆠𒋾, romanized: a-ki-ti) (Akkadian: 𒀉𒆠𒌈, romanized: akītu(m)) is a spring festival and New Year's celebration, held on the first day of the Assyrian and Babylonian Nisan in ancient Mesopotamia and in Assyrian communities around the world, to celebrate the sowing of barley. Akitu originates from the Sumerian spring New Year festival of Zagmuk.

== Babylonian Akitu ==
The Babylonian festival traditionally started on 4 Nissan, the first month of the year, as a celebration of the sowing of barley. All the people in the city would celebrate, including the awilu (upper class), muskena (middle class), wardu (lower class), High Priest, and the King.

=== First to Third Day ===
The priest of Ésagila (Marduk's house) would recite sad prayers with the other priests and the people would answer with equally sad prayers which expressed humanity's fear of the unknown. This fear of the unknown explains why the high priest would head to the Ésagila every day asking for Marduk's forgiveness, begging him to protect Babylon, his holy city, and asking him to have favor on the city. This prayer was called "The Secret Of Ésagila". It reads:

"Lord without peer in thy wrath,
Lord, gracious king, lord of the lands,
Who made salvation for the great gods,
Lord, who throwest down the strong by his glance,
Lord of kings, light of men, who dost apportion destinies,
O Lord, Babylon is thy seat, Borsippa thy crown
The wide heavens are thy body....
Within thine arms thou takest the strong....
Within thy glance thou grantest them grace,
Makest them see light so that they proclaim thy power.
Lord of the lands, light of the Igigi, who pronouncest blessings;
Who would not proclaim thy, yea, thy power?
Would not speak of thy majesty, praise thy dominion?
Lord of the lands, who livest in Eudul, who takest the fallen by the hand;
Have pity upon thy city, Babylon
Turn thy face towards Esagila, thy temple
Give freedom to them that dwell in Babylon, thy wards!"

On the second day the high priest would bathe in the Euphrates River before performing special prayers at the temple with the other priests.

On the third day special craftsmen would create two puppets made of wood, gold, and precious stones and dress them in red. These puppets were set aside and would be used on the sixth day. Meanwhile, the priests and the people would pray before sunset. The king took a statue of Nabu son of Marduk into the temple to be worshipped.

=== Fourth Day ===
The fourth day involved memorials and celebration. The priests would tell creation stories while the people would sing and dance.

=== Fifth Day ===
On this day the public would gather at the river to eat together and celebrate. Meanwhile, the king was brought to the temple, where he would show humility before the gods. The high priest would slap the king as a way to further induce humility; the king's tears were seen as a good omen for the coming year. The priests would then reintroduce the king to the public.

=== Sixth Day ===
Before the gods arrived, the day would be filled with commotion. The puppets that were made on the third day would be burned and mock battle would be taking place as well. This commotion signified that without Marduk, the city would be in constant chaos. The priests would also collect all statues of the gods on this day and bring them inside the temple.

=== Seventh Day ===
Marduk was said to disappear on this day to go fight the goddess Tiamat. Nabu and other gods were said to go out to go rescue Marduk from a prison in the mountains of the universe.

=== Eighth Day ===
It was said that on this day the other gods would give their power to Marduk, making him the supreme god.

=== Ninth Day ===
On this day a large procession was held with the king and the gods, adorned with gold and precious stones.

=== Tenth Day ===
It is said that on this day Marduk began celebrating his victory alongside the other gods. He returned to the capital to perform a ritual marriage ceremony to ensure the fertility of the land.

=== Eleventh Day ===
The gods return accompanied by their Lord Marduk to meet again in the Destinies Hall "Upshu Ukkina", where they met for the first time on the eighth day, this time they will decide the fate of the people of Marduk. In ancient Assyrian philosophy Creation in general was considered as a covenant between heaven and earth as long as a human serves the gods till his death, therefore, gods' happiness isn't complete except if humans are happy as well, thus a human's destiny will be to be given happiness on the condition that he serves the gods. So Marduk and the gods renew their covenant with Babylon, by promising the city another cycle of seasons. After the fate of mankind is decided, Marduk returns to the heavens.

=== Twelfth Day ===
On the last day of the festival it was believed that the gods returned to the temple.

=== Legacy ===
The festival was also adopted in the Neo-Assyrian Empire following the destruction of Babylon. King Sennacherib in 683 BC built an "Akitu house" outside the walls of Assur. Another Akitu house was built outside Nineveh. The Akitu festival was continued throughout the Seleucid Empire and into the Roman Empire period. At the beginning of the 3rd century, it was still celebrated in Emessa, Syria, in honour of the god Elagabal. The Roman emperor Elagabalus (r. 218-222), who was of Syrian origin, even introduced the festival in Italy (Herodian, Roman History, 5.6).

The new moon of Aviv, the month of barley ripening, marks the beginning of the Jewish ecclesiastical year. (Exodus 13:4; 23:15) Since the Babylonian captivity, this month has mainly been called Nisan (Nehemiah 2:1, Esther 3:7)

Kha b-Nisan is the name of the spring festival among the Assyrians. The festival is celebrated on April 1, corresponding to the start of the Assyrian calendar.

The Assyrian and Babylonian Akitu festival has played a pivotal role in the development of theories of religion, myth and ritual. While the purpose of the festival remains a point of contention among both historians of religion and Assyriologists, it is certain to have played a pivotal role in the regular setting of an agenda, priorities, and in the overall advancement of Western Civilization as being one of the first regularly occurring forums where proposals for social maintenance or change could consistently be made and crucial issues readily addressed.

== Modern observances ==
The modern observance of Akitu began in the 1960s during the Assyrian intellectual renaissance. Due to political oppression, however, the celebrations were largely private until the 1990s. It is interchangeably referred to as Akitu and Assyrian New Year, and unlike the historical festival it is only celebrated for one day, the first of April.

Assyrians continue to observe and celebrate Akitu with parades, picnics, and parties both in Iraq and in the diaspora. Those celebrating will wear traditional Assyrian clothing and poppies and use the greetings Reesh Shato Brikhto, Reesha D’Sheeta Brikhta or Akitu Breekha. Some people will dress up as ancient Assyrian royalty. Due to its modern alignment with April Fool's Day, the festival is often more lighthearted than its historical counterpart.

One tradition, Deqna Nissan or "The Beard of April", involves Assyrian women gathering plants and flowers and fashioning them into a garland for a home's front door. Newer traditions have also arisen in diaspora communities. The Assyrian community in Yonkers, New York has a tradition of raising the Assyrian flag in front of City Hall on April 1.

== See also ==
- Ancient Mesopotamian religion
- Babylonian religion
- Dehwa Rabba in Mandaeism
- Dumuzid
- Katabasis#Trip into the underworld

== Bibliography ==
- Julye Bidmead (2004). The Akitu Festival: Religious Continuity and Royal Legitimation in Mesopotamia. Piscataway, NJ: Gorgias Press. ISBN 1-59333-158-4.
- Svend A. Pallis (1926). The Babylonian Akitu Festival, Copenhagen.
- Abraham Sachs (1969). "Akkadian Rituals", in: J. B. Pritchard, ANET, 3rd. ed., Princeton, pp. 331–4.
- Karel van der Toorn (1990). 'Het Babylonische Nieuwjaarsfeest' in Phoenix. Bulletin van het Vooraziatisch-Egyptisch Genootschap Ex Oriente Lux 36/1, 10-29 online link.
- Heinrich Zimmern (1906), Zum babylonischen Neujahrhfest, BVSGW, vol. 58, pp. 126–56; vol. 70 (1918), pt. 3, 52 pp.
