= Feast of Wine =

Jewish festival in the Qumran Temple Scroll

- Type: Judaism
- Celebrations: Drinking and eating
- Observances: Offering new wine to God following animal sacrifice
- Begins: Third day of the fifth month (Av)

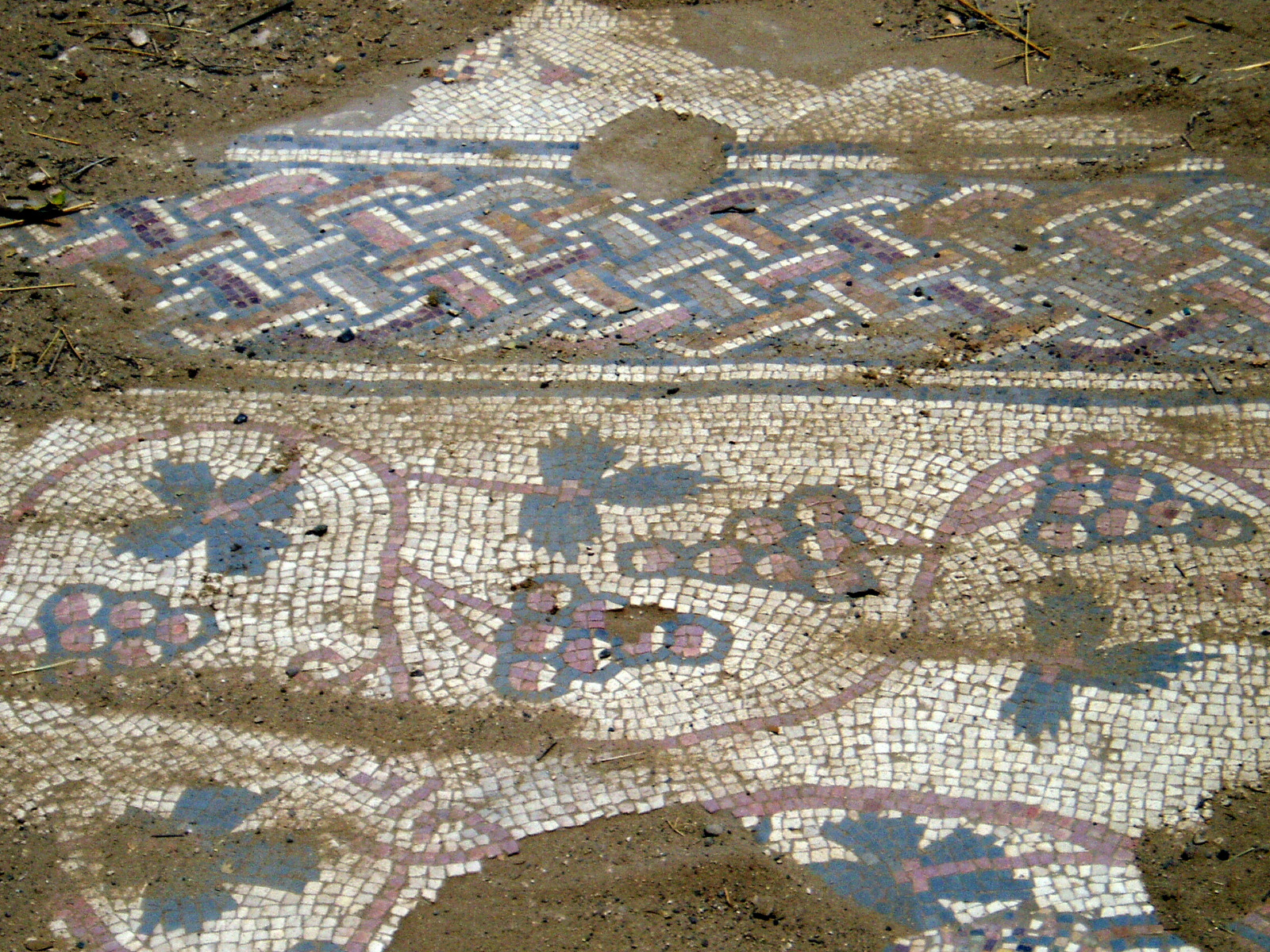
Mosaic with grapes

The Feast of Wine is a Jewish festival prescribed in the Q11 Qumran Temple Scroll, a document found among the Dead Sea Scrolls that describes an idealized temple and its regulations. It seems to have evaded notice of the composers of the Tanakh, hence it was unknown until the 90s Qumran discoveries. They also discovered a Feast of New Oil.

The festival celebrates the new wine on the third day of the fifth month (Av), fifty days after the festival of the First Fruits of grain. On this day, the peoples offer new wine to God "a third from the new wine of each of the 12 tribes" following abstinence from old wine.

Reeves sees the festival as coincident with an old way of reckoning the first day of the first month.

== Mood or manner ==
Jubilant.

== Excerpt ==
There is a Noah story, expounding on his vine aspect, known from its allusions in the Tanakh after the Flood story.

And in the seventh week, in its first year, in this jubilee, Noah planted grape-vines on the mountain where the ark came to rest, whose name was Lubar, one of the mountains of Ararat. They bore fruit in the fourth year,13 and he protected their fruit and harvested it the same year in the seventh month. And he made wine from it, and placed it in a vessel, and kept it until the fifth year, until the first day, the new moon of the first month. And he observed that day a joyful festival,14 and prepared a burnt-offering for the Lord—one young bull, one ram, and seven lambs each a year old—and one goat kid, that he might make atonement with it for himself and for his sons. And he prepared the goat kid first, and placed some of its blood upon the flesh that (was on) the altar which he had built, and all the fat he offered upon the altar, the place where he prepare the burnt-offering—the young bull, the ram, and the lambs. He (then) offered all their flesh upon the altar. And he placed all their sacrifices mingled with oil upon it, and then sprinkled the wine upon the fire which he had placed upon the altar, and (having) placed incense upon the altar, he offered a pleasing fragrance which would be acceptable to the Lord his God. And he rejoiced and drank the (new) wine, he and his sons with joy. (Jub. vii 1–6)

Reeves says see Yadin, vol. I, p. 110, n. 19

== Comparative ==
The Ugaritic Vintage Rites (KTU 1.41 // 1.87 COS 1.95) describe the most extensive Ugaritic ritual we know. It may have been a new year event. Twice-attested, it was likely canon. It mentions the new moon, grape clusters, birds, bathing, clapping, the Lady of the Temples, and other gods and goddesses.

Papyrus Amherst 63 is another New Year-emphasizing text.

== See also ==
- Ugaritic vintage rites
- Papyrus Amherst 63
- Astarte and the Insatiable Sea
- Sukkot
- Dionysus
- Bacchius Iudaeus
- Shedeh
- Zagmuk

== External ==
- https://www.thetorah.com/article/rosh-hashanah-with-the-early-israelites – On early New Year

== Bibliography ==
- Van Der Toorn, Karel (2017). "Celebrating the New Year with the Israelites: Three Extrabiblical Psalms from Papyrus Amherst 63". Journal of Biblical Literature. 136 (3): 633–649. doi:10.1353/jbl.2017.0040. ISSN 1934-3876.
- Reeves, John C. (1992). "The Feast of the First Fruits of Wine and the Ancient Canaanite Calendar". Vetus Testamentum. 42 (3). Brill: 350–361. ISSN 0042-4935. JSTOR 1518725.
