= Śmigus-dyngus =

Celebration held on Easter Monday in Poland and Central Europe

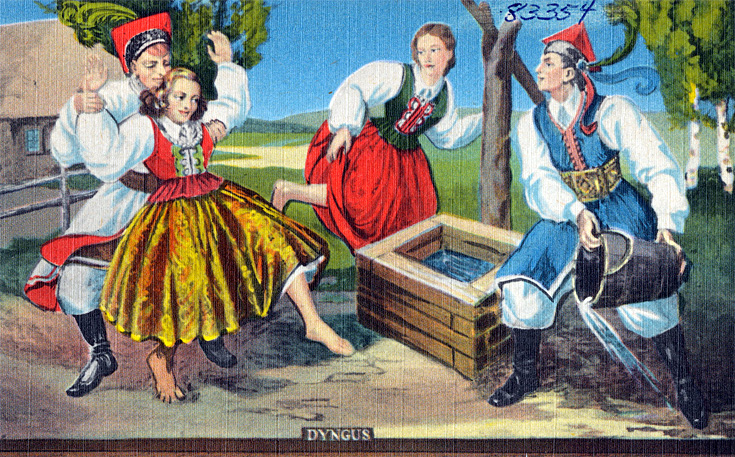
- A postcard showing youth dousing each other with water on Śmigus-dyngus
- Also called: Dyngus Day
- Observed by: Poles, Hungarians, Slovaks
- Type: Christian, cultural
- Significance: Commemorates the Baptism of Poland and the arrival of Easter Monday
- Observances: Service of Worship / Mass, the throwing of water on one another, family meals and visitation
- 2025 date: April 21 (Western); April 21 (Eastern)
- 2026 date: April 6 (Western); April 13 (Eastern)
- 2027 date: March 29 (Western); May 3 (Eastern)
- 2028 date: April 17 (Western); April 17 (Eastern)
- Frequency: annual
- Related to: Eastertide

Śmigus-dyngus (Note: Czech: Oblévačka; Slovak: Oblievačka; Hungarian: Vízbevető; German: Smigus dyngus) (Polish pronunciation: [ˈɕmigus ˈdɨnɡus]) or lany poniedziałek (Note: Ukrainian: поливаний понеділок; Serbian: Vodeni ponedeljak; Serbian Cyrillic: Водени понедељак) (Polish pronunciation: [ˈlanɨ ˌpɔɲɛˈd͡ʑawɛk]) is a celebration held on Easter Monday across Central Europe, and in small parts of Eastern and Southern Europe. The Eastertide tradition is widely associated with Poland in English-speaking countries and is observed by Polish diaspora communities, particularly among Polish Americans who call it Dyngus Day. Customs surrounding Śmigus-dyngus celebrate the arrival of Christianity in Poland. A similar tradition also exists among Hungarians, the Easter sprinkling called locsolkodás (sprinkling) and in Slovakia, called oblievačka (the pouring).

On Śmigus-dyngus, Polish families traditionally visit or call relatives, gifting them Paschal eggs. Mass has historically been well attended by Christians on Śmigus-dyngus. People douse each other in water; in particular, boys throw water over girls on Easter Monday. This is symbolic of the "cleansing of one from sins and marking the end of Lent with a day of feasting and merrymaking". The custom may derive from a commemoration of the Baptism of Poland, when the Polish people became Christians and received baptism en masse. Additionally, certain scholars trace the custom to Jerusalem, in which water was used to disperse crowds who were gathering to discuss the resurrection of Jesus.

In some regions males gently strike females with pussy willow branches obtained from Palm Sunday church services in the previous week. This is accompanied by a number of other rituals, such as making verse declarations and holding door-to-door processions, in some regions involving boys dressed as bears or other creatures. The celebration is described in writing as early as the 15th century. It continues to be observed throughout Central Europe and also in the United States, especially among Christians of the Catholic, Lutheran and Anglican traditions.

== Origins and etymology ==
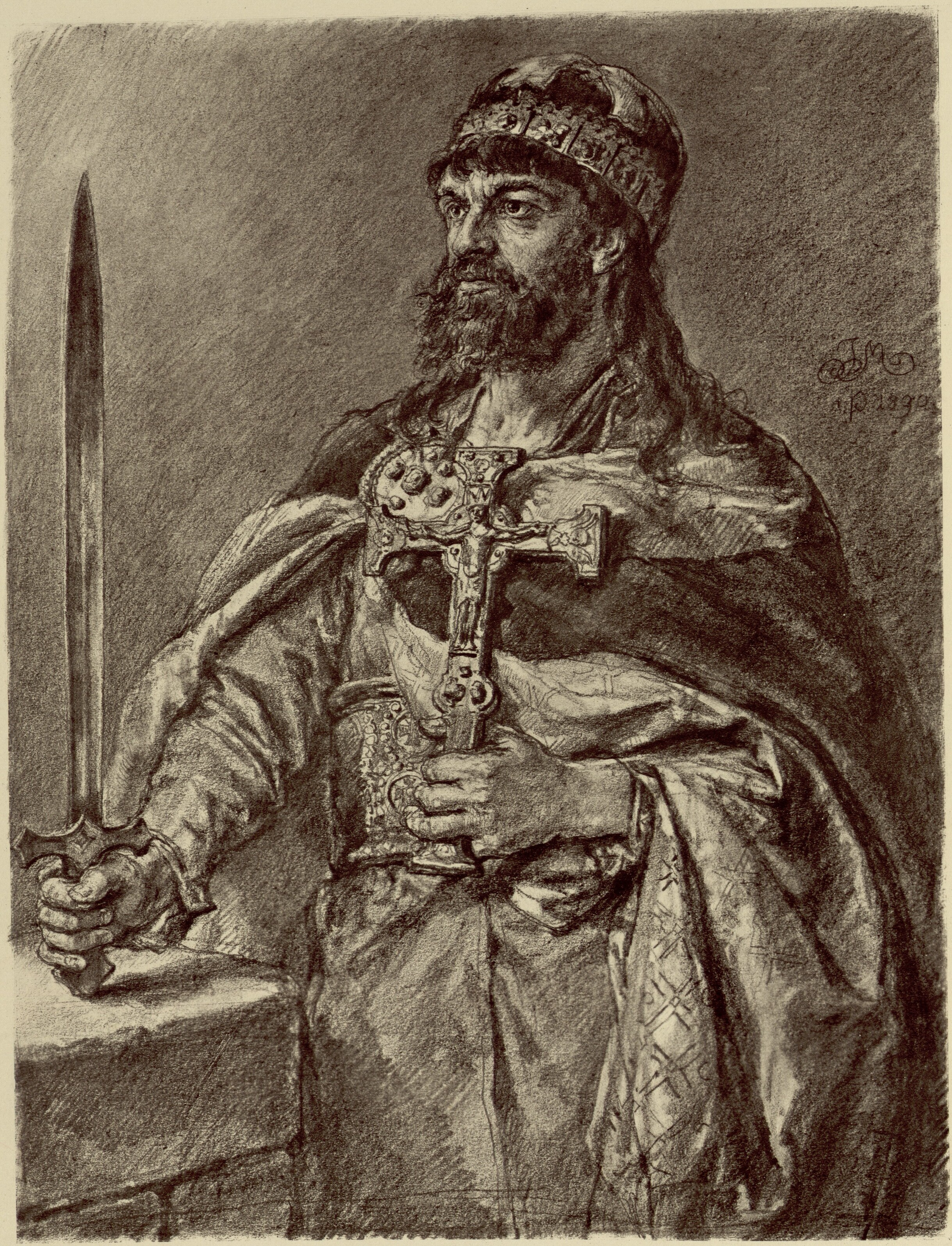
Mieszko I, the first Christian ruler of Poland, holding a crucifix in an allusion to the Baptism of Poland.

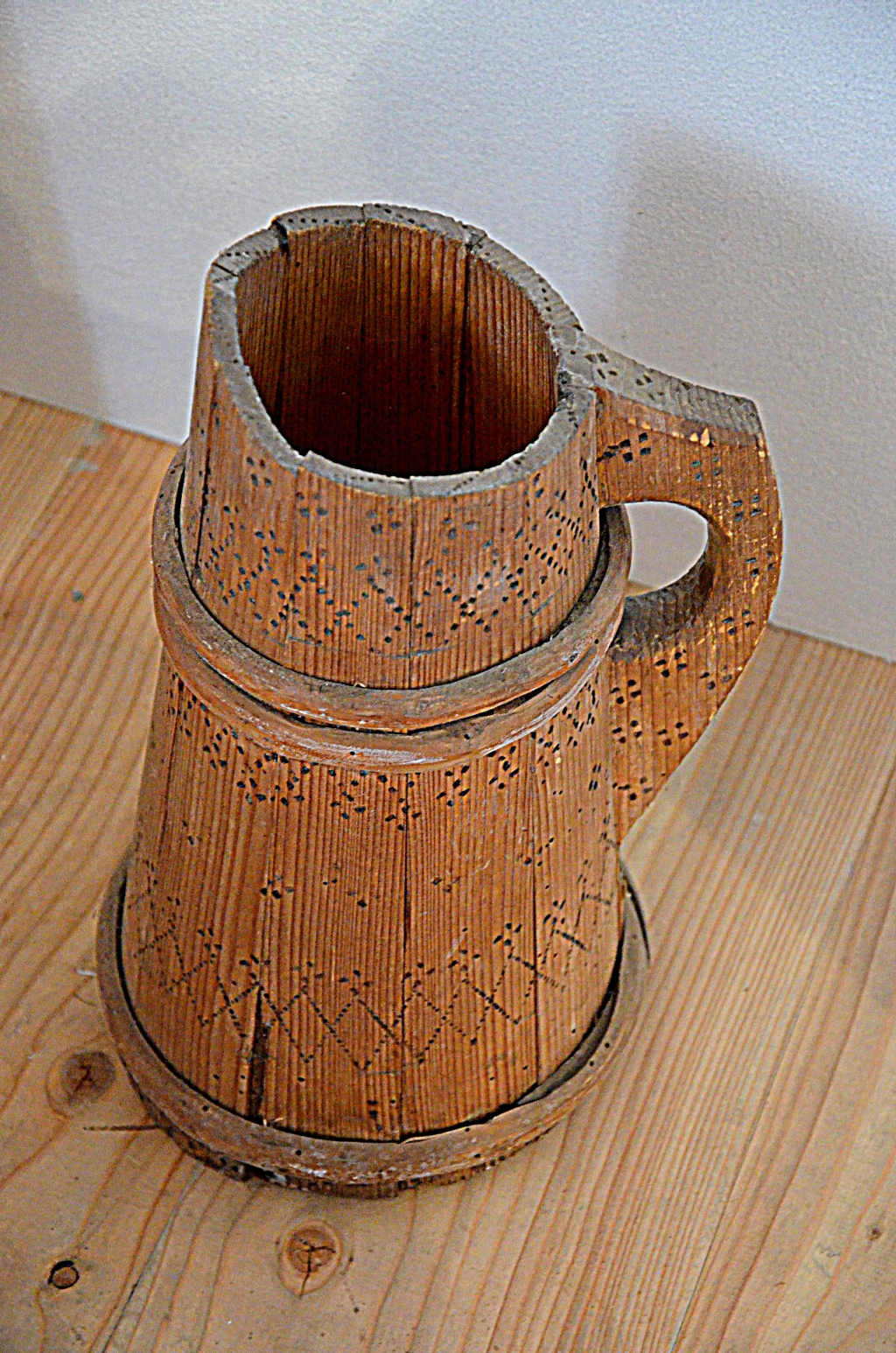
A traditional stave tankard used for soaking

The origins of the word dyngus are obscure. It may come from the German Dingeier ("owed eggs", the Easter eggs that are to be given to children) or Dingnis, Dingnus (ransom paid during the war to protect against pillaging). The celebration has been traced back to the 14th century of the Christian era, though it is claimed that it may have earlier pre-Christian origins involving the celebration of the March equinox.

Certain academics have suggested that the use of water is an allusion to the baptism of Mieszko I, the Duke of West Polans (c. 935–992) in AD 966, uniting all of Poland under the banner of Christianity. The New Cambridge Medieval History, however, suggests that it originated far to the west of Poland and was adopted under German influence. Originally śmigus and dyngus were two separate events, with śmigus involving symbolic whipping with willow twigs and the act of throwing water (oblewanki) and dyngus bribing people with pisanki to escape from śmigus; later both traditions merged.

Attempts have been made to curtail certain customs associated with Śmigus-dyngus; in 1410 the Bishop of Poznań issued an edict titled Dingus Prohibetur, which instructed residents not to "pester or plague others in what is universally called Dingus".

== Poland ==
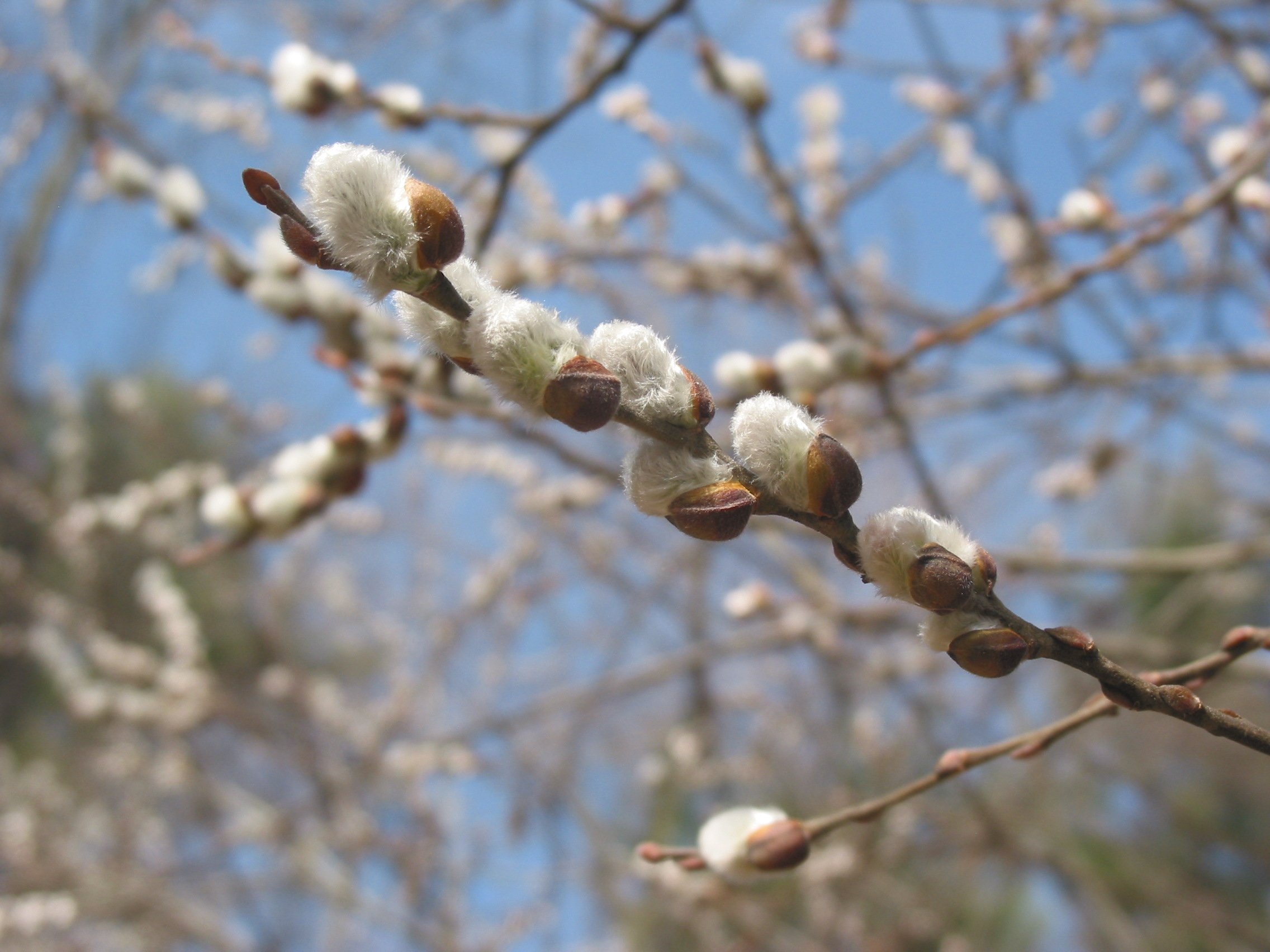
Pussy willow branches from Palm Sunday church services are used for celebrations.

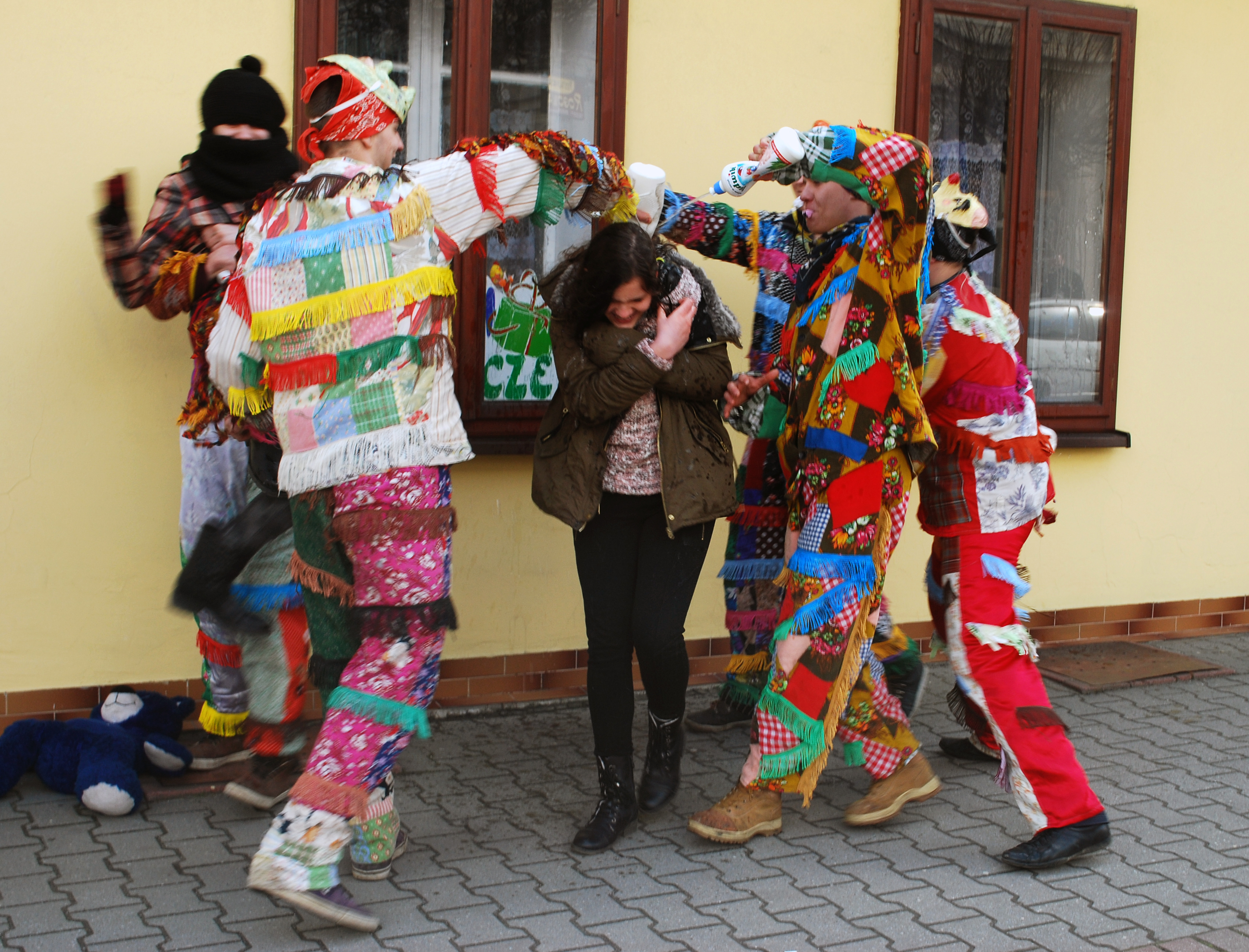
Dyngus in Wilamowice, southern Poland, where the men wander around the town in colourful handmade costumes in search of a woman to soak

The festival is traditionally celebrated by boys throwing water over girls they like. Sometimes they also strike them with pussy willows. Deborah Anders Silverman writes that "The Easter whipping custom still exists in Central Europe; Laszlo Lukacs cites variants in Poland, Hungary, and Germany. Whipping and other Dyngus Day customs are seldom observed in the older Polish communities of the United States, some of which date from the 1880s. Water splashing, however, is still done as a joke in southern Ontario, where a more recent group of Polish immigrants has settled." Boys would sneak into girls' homes at daybreak on Easter Monday and throw containers of water over them while they were still in bed.

After all the water had been thrown, the screaming girls would often be dragged to a nearby river or pond for another drenching. Sometimes a girl would be carried out, still in her bed, before both bed and girl were thrown into the water together. Particularly attractive girls could expect to be soaked repeatedly during the day. The use of water is said to evoke the spring rains needed to ensure a successful harvest later in the year. In some regions, girls could save themselves from a soaking by giving boys "ransoms" of painted eggs (pisanki), regarded as magical charms that would bring good harvests, successful relationships and healthy childbirths. In the past the girls were supposed to wait until the following day to get their revenge by soaking the boys, but in practice both sexes throw water over each other on the same day. The nowadays custom turns usually into a regular water fight.

Pussy willows appear to have been adopted as an alternative to the palm leaves used elsewhere in Easter celebrations, which were not obtainable in Poland. They were blessed by priests on Palm Sunday, following which parishioners whipped each other with the pussy willow branches, saying Nie ja bije, wierzba bije, za tydzień, wielki dzień, za sześć noc, Wielkanoc ("It's not me who strikes, the willow strikes, in a week, holy day, in six nights, Easter"). The pussy willows were then treated as sacred charms that could prevent lightning strikes, protect animals and encourage honey production. They were believed to bring health and good fortune to people as well, and it was traditional for three pussy willow buds to be swallowed on Palm Sunday to promote good health. As with the water-throwing, boys would whip girls with pussy willows on Easter Monday and girls would do the same to boys on the following Tuesday.

The celebration would traditionally be accompanied by declarations in verse, in which a young man would climb on the roof of a building in the village, beat on a tin pan and announce which girls were to be doused along with how many wagon-loads of sand, how much water and how much soap would be used on each girl. The girls would also respond in verse, announcing that there was someone who would save her. For instance,

From the tavern roof would come the announcement that Zośka, because she dressed badly, kept her house untidy, and quarreled with everyone, will have a dyngus of a hundred barrels of water, a hundred cartloads of sand and a hundred lashes. Then from a window would come the reply that Zośka is not frightened because Jasiek stands beside her with a bottle of whiskey to buy off all assailants and ransom her off from the penalty.

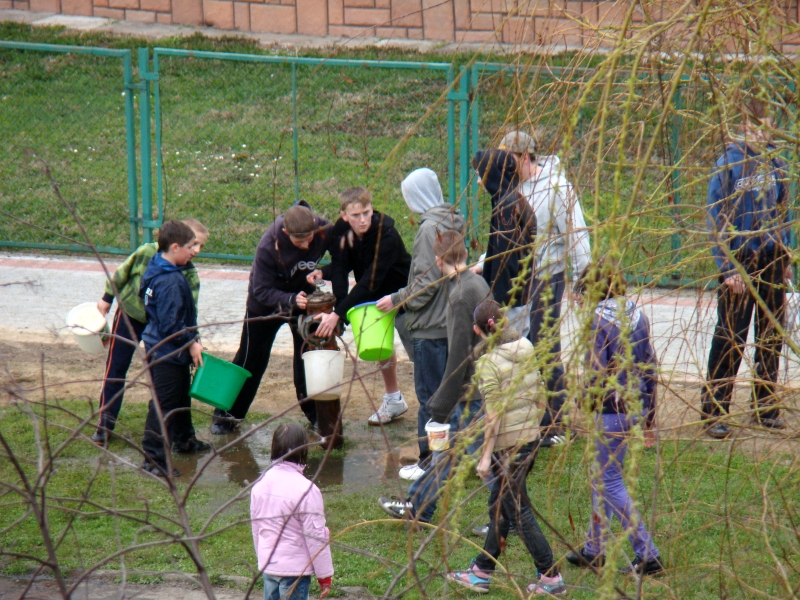
Śmigus-dyngus in Sanok, 2010

A dyngus procession would also be held, either on Easter Monday or Tuesday. A parade of boys would take part in a march known as chodzenie po dyngusie – "going on the dyngus" – or z kogutkiem – "with the cockerel", a reference to the use of a live bird, usually taken without permission and stuffed with grain soaked in vodka to make him crow loudly. (A decorated and carved wooden rooster was sometimes used as an alternative.) The rooster was a symbol of fertility, carried on a small two-wheeled wagon which had been painted red and decorated with ribbons and flowers, to which was often also added small puppets representing a wedding party. This would be pushed from door to door by the boys, who would crow like roosters and sing dyngus songs conveying good wishes and requests for gifts and food. Their objective was to encourage the inhabitants to give them food from their Easter tables, such as Easter eggs, ham and sausages. A typical dyngus song went:

Your duck has told me
That you've baked a cake
Your hen has told me
She's laid you a basket and a half of eggs
Your sow has told me that you've killed her son
If not her son then her little daughter
Give me something if only a bit of her fat
Who will not be generous today
Let him not count on heaven.

In some regional variants of po dyngusie, the boys would march through the village with one of their number dressed as a bear with a bell on his head – either wearing a real bearskin or a stand-in made of pea vines. The group would go from door to door collecting "gifts for the bear" before "drowning" the bear in a nearby stream or pond. This was probably an adaptation of a traditional ceremony to drown a straw figure of Marzanna, the spirit of winter. The "bears" were often invited in as they were believed to ensure that there would be a good harvest, reflecting a very ancient belief in the power of the bear to prevent evil, encourage crop growth and cure diseases. In the historical regions of Mazovia and Lesser Poland, boys wearing bearskins would also chase girls. A similar custom is seen in the Siwki Easter tradition.

Girls had their own version of po dyngusie in which they would go from door to door carrying a freshly cut green branch or gaj, seeking food and singing songs welcoming the "new year" that followed Easter:

Our green little tree, beautifully decked
Goes everywhere
For it is proper that it should
We go with it to the manor house
Wishing good fortune, good health
For this new year
Which God has given us.

Families would also visit each other on the same day to deliver presents of Easter eggs or rolls, receiving in return gifts of food from the Easter table.

== Hungary ==
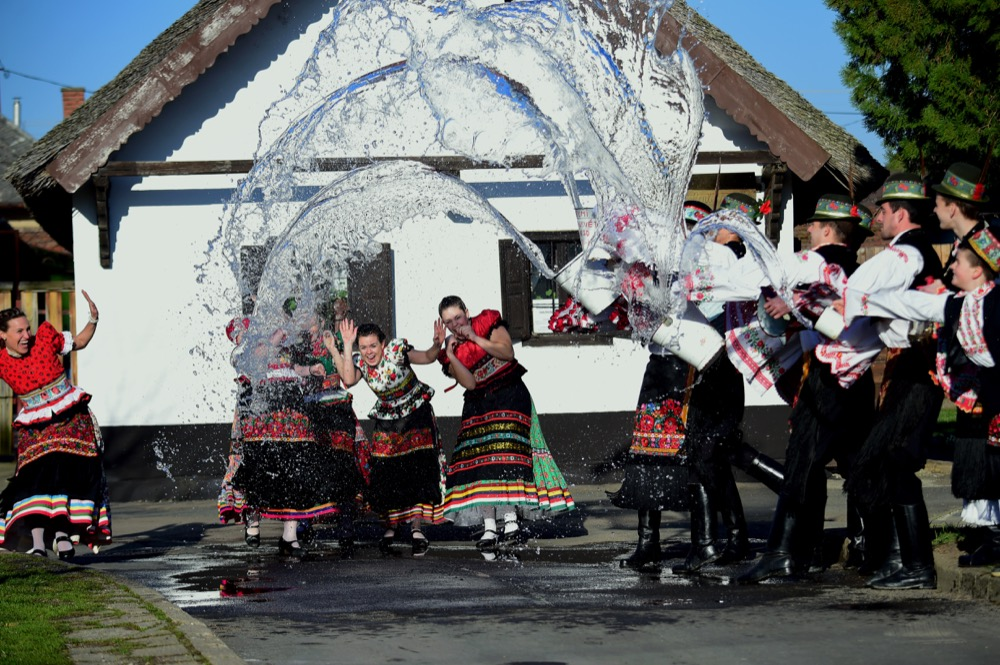
Locsolkodás in Matyóföld region of Hungary

Among Hungarians in Hungary and in the Carpathian Basin, this Easter Monday custom is known as locsolkodás (sprinkling). It is common between continental Hungarians and Hungarian Americans. Traditionally, young men splashed young women with a bucket of cold water (usually at dawn, when the girls were still in bed). Fifty years ago, it was still common to see girls thrown into the trough, dressed in their finest for the noble occasion. In return, women are expected to provide men with either painted eggs or a drink of palinka.

According to this custom, on Easter Monday boys sprinkle water on girls they know. More recently, primarily scented cologne or, in more playful variations, other liquids. The day was historically called "Water-Throwing Monday" or "Dousing Monday", as even some decades ago it was common practice to drench girls with buckets of water or even throw them into watering troughs. The girls, dressed in their finest clothes for the occasion, would take part in the ritual despite its rougher nature. Today, this more extreme form of sprinkling is mainly preserved in rural or small-town settings, especially among groups dedicated to maintaining traditional customs.

In modern times, a gentler version has become widespread. After reciting a short "sprinkling poem", boys lightly spray girls with perfume, though in more humorous cases, tools such as flower sprayers, soda siphons, or garden hoses may still be used. In return, the boys are rewarded with decorated red eggs, often intricately painted or dyed, known as Easter eggs.

== Slovakia ==
The Wet Monday custom in Slovakia called oblievačka closely follow the general customs described above. In recent years, diaspora Slovaks have made feminist complaints, regarding the dousing as a "stressful" reinforcement of gender roles.

Bands of young men and boys earn chocolate and "something for their piggy bank" by whipping – šibať – and pouring water – oblievať – on young Slovak women. These customs, "once believed to purify the soul and body, are the remnants of a complex system of Slovak folk traditions based around the seasons of the year." The holiday is celebrated the Monday following Easter as "a day of folk traditions".

== Ukraine ==
The occasion is celebrated as Drenching Monday (Обливаний понеділок; Oblyvanyi ponedilok) in Ukraine, where, in the week after Easter is known as "Bright Week", with water celebrations subsequently occupying Monday (men splashing women), Tuesday, (women splashing men) and Wednesday (everybody splashing everybody). Monday is a day for visiting neighbors, wishing them health and fortune, and exchanging Easter eggs. In Ukraine cultural importance of this holiday is more emphasized with secular festivals at cultural organizations like Kyiv's National Museum of Folk Architecture and Life of Ukraine.

In cities like Lviv (prior to events of February 2022) the Lviv City Council recognized the holiday with the creation of special zones with ongoing access to water in the city's famous Rynok Square, the event having evolved into a secular celebration of spring, emphasizing playful rather than focusing on the historical religious significance of the event. City Councillors describe it as "first of all a merry holiday," invigorating its participants, and an "inseparable" element of post-Easter celebrations.

== United States ==
=== Buffalo, New York ===
Dyngus Day is observed in many Polish American communities, including Buffalo, New York. The Buffalo dyngus celebrations started in 1961, introduced by the Chopin Singing Society, a Polish-American organization led by married judges Theodore and Ann Mikoll. The introduction was an effort by the Polish-American community in the city to find a new focus for its identity. It proved hugely successful, to the point that a local newspaper claimed that "everybody is Polish on Dyngus Day." Buffalo comedian and former television personality "Airborne Eddy" Dobosiewicz is credited with establishing the city's Dyngus Day parade in 2006 and turning the holiday into a major Buffalo event. It has become a fusion of Polish and American traditions, with polka bands, a parade, consumption of krupnik, and Polish food accompanying American patriotic songs sung in English. Party-goers dress up in the white-and-red colors of the Polish flag and carry balloons saying "Happy Dyngus Day" in English.

=== Cleveland, Ohio ===
Dyngus Day in Cleveland is celebrated with a parade, polka, and the crowning of Miss Dyngus. Large celebrations are centered on several West Side neighborhoods, including Ohio City, Tremont, and Detroit–Shoreway. The center of the celebration is held at Gordon Square. A notable local leader of the celebration is DJ Kishka, playing mostly polka and Cleveland-style Polka. Relatedly, Cleveland is home to the Polka Hall of Fame. Cleveland contains a strong Polish American community, including five churches in the city limits who continue to say Mass in the Polish language-St. Stanislaus, St. Casimir, St. Barbara, Immaculate Heart of Mary, and St. John Cantius.

Recent years have seen annual events of Pierogi-eating contests and the Miss Dyngus Day contest. Several local breweries make special releases of Polish and Dyngus Day beer.

=== Macedon, New York ===
Dyngus Day in Macedon, New York, and its sister village Hoosick Falls, is celebrated with a town festival and folk dressed along Appian Way. Local celebrations are often held as well as festivals where local residents wear bright, green colors.

=== South Bend, Indiana ===
Dyngus Day is also celebrated annually in South Bend, Indiana and the surrounding region, including in LaPorte, Indiana. In South Bend, the day marks the official beginning to launch the year's political primary campaign season (particularly among Democrats) – often from within the West Side Democratic Club, the M.R. Falcons Club, Z.B. Falcons, the South Bend Firefighters' Association and local pubs and fraternal halls. Notable politicos who have celebrated Dyngus Day in South Bend include Robert F. Kennedy; former Governor Joe Kernan; Senator Evan Bayh; former Congressman and New York University President John Brademas; former Maryland Lt. Governor Kathleen Kennedy Townsend; former Congressman, 9/11 Commission member and former Ambassador to India Timothy J. Roemer; former President Bill Clinton; the philanthropist Thomas A. White; and the late Aloysius J. Kromkowski, a long time elected St. Joseph County public servant, for whom the "Al Kromkowski polka" is named. Visitors in 2008 included then–senators Barack Obama and Hillary Clinton.

Robert F. Kennedy's 1968 appearance was marked by his downtown rally attended by a crowd of over 6,000, his participation in the Dyngus Day parade, and his leading of the crowds at the West Side Democratic Club in the traditional Polish well-wishing song Sto Lat (phonetic: 'sto laht') which means [may you live] "100 years". Indiana was RFK's first primary and first primary victory, which set in motion momentum and victories that may have led to his nomination as the Democratic Party candidate for president had he not been assassinated.

=== Pasadena, California ===
At the California Institute of Technology, the Blacker House celebrates Dyngus Day. As they already have a long-standing tradition of waiters at dinners "dumping" attendees who act out of order, Dyngus Day provides an additional excuse for the waiters to dump attendees of the opposite gender. Dumps are accompanied by light slaps by a twig from the courtyard tree, and a volunteering Senior reads a Dyngus Day poem (as songs are banned during dinner).

=== Pine Creek, Wisconsin ===
In the Polish-American community of Pine Creek, Wisconsin, when throwing water over the girls, the boys would chant Dyngus, dyngus, po dwa jaja; nie chcę chleba tylko jaja ("Dyngus, dyngus, for two eggs; I don't want bread, only eggs").

== See also ==
- Easter whip
- Water Festival Southeast Asian celebration with some similarities but a different religious and cultural background.
- Dziady śmigustne, local Polish Easter tradition
- Śmiergust
- Nusardil, an Assyrian festival with similar elements
