= Nusardil =

Assyrian Christian festival

Nusardîl
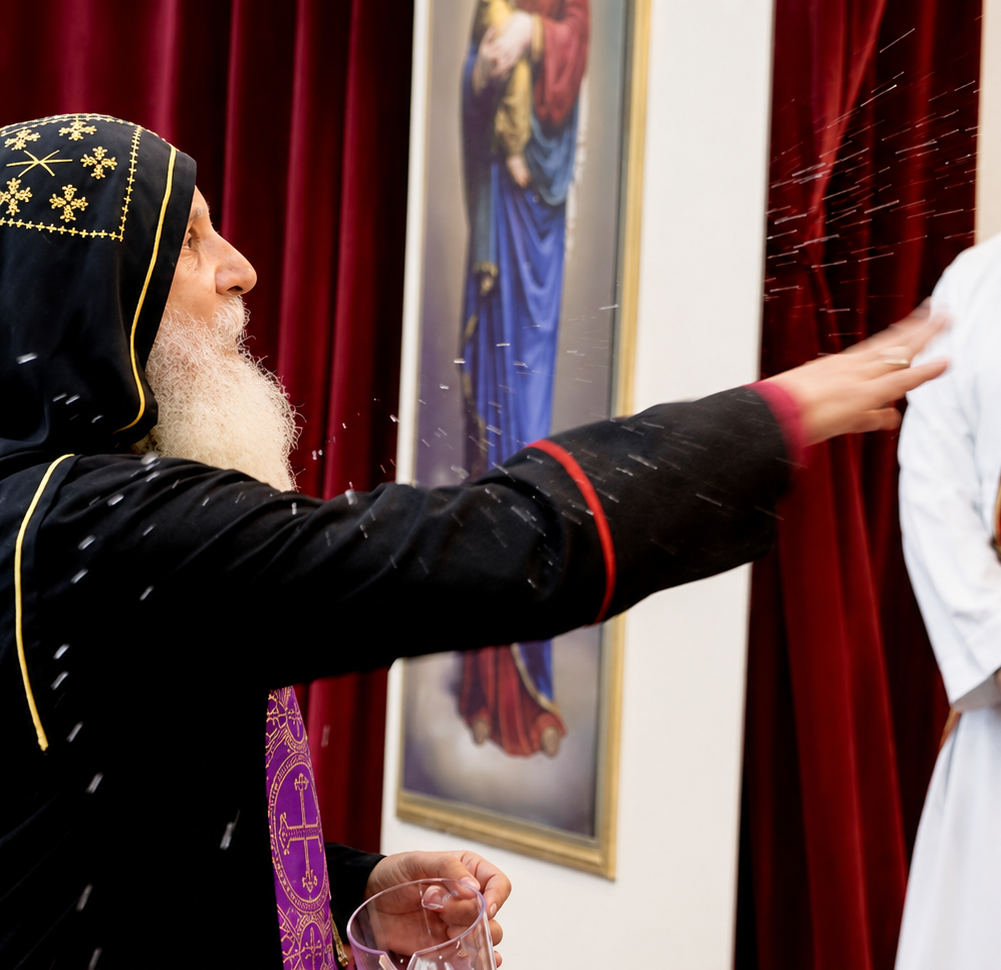
- Mar Mari Emmanuel sprinkling water on another priest during the festival in 2026.
- Official name: ܢܘܼܣܲܪܕܝܠ (Syriac)
- Observed by: Assyrian people
- Type: Assyrian Christian festival
- Significance: Commemorates the baptism of converts by Saint Thomas
- Celebrations: Divine Liturgy, blessing of water, sprinkling water on others, family gatherings and communal celebrations
- Begins: Seventh Sunday after the Ascension (Mid-July)
- Ends: Same day
- Frequency: Annual
- Related to: Thomas the Apostle

Nusardil (Syriac: ܢܘܼܣܲܪܕܝܠ), also spelled Nusardel, Musardil or Musardeh, depending on the Assyrian dialect, is a traditional Assyrian festival celebrated during midsummer by members of the Assyrian Church of the East, the Ancient Church of the East, the Chaldean Catholic Church and the Syriac Orthodox Church. Also known as the Feast of God, the Feast of the Apostles, the water holiday and the Assyrian water day, the feast commemorates the baptism of converts by Saint Thomas according to Assyrian Christian tradition, and is commonly observed through the blessing and sprinkling of water after the Divine Liturgy.

Celebrated 50 days after the Ascension of Christ, the water-sprinkling festival is described in the Ḥūdhrā, the principal liturgical book of the Church of the East. Several scholars have suggested that Nusardil preserves elements of older Mesopotamian seasonal traditions that were later incorporated into Christian practice. As a movable feast, it does not fall on a fixed calendar date and generally occurs in July, during the Assyrian month of Tammuz.

== History ==
=== Ancient origins ===
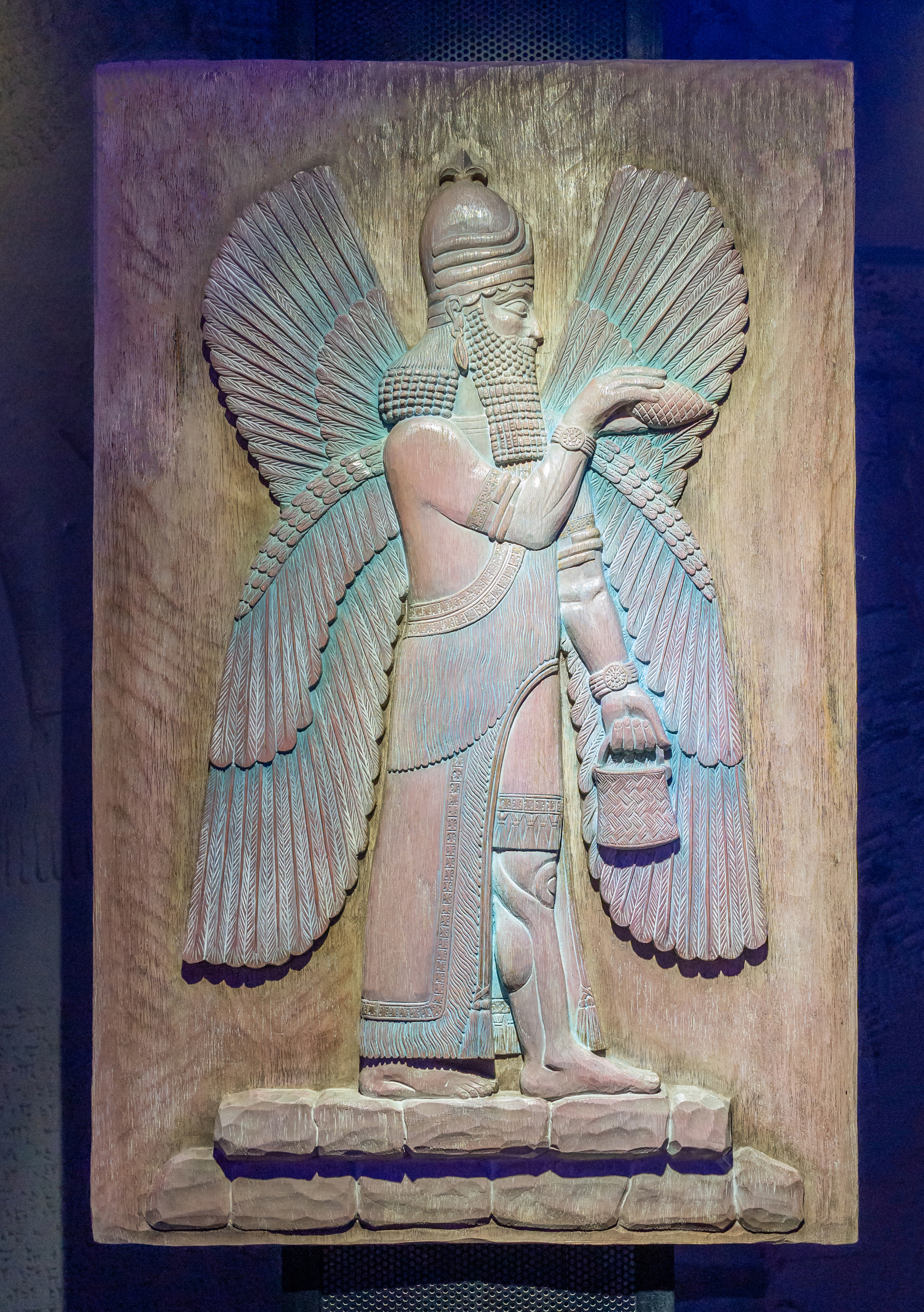
Neo-Assyrian winged protective deity, Ashur, with a ritual bucket and purifying cone.

Nusardil is an ancient Assyrian festival with origins dating back thousands of years, rooted in agricultural and religious traditions. Water played a central role in the festival, which was traditionally associated with purification and renewal. During the hot summer month of Tammuz, Assyrian kings were said to sprinkle holy water on people, crops and other objects (with a pinecone) to wash away misfortune and evil intentions, ritually purify the community, and invoke blessings for a fruitful harvest.

Water drawn from sacred springs and the Tigris and Euphrates rivers was regarded as especially sacred and was used in annual purification ceremonies. According to one interpretation, an Assyrian stone water basin discovered at the Temple of Ashur depicts water deities holding buckets and ritual cones, symbolising the collection and distribution of sacred water to bless the land and its people.

According to Encyclopaedia Iranica, the festival may have originated in ancient Assyrian and Mesopotamian rites associated with the New Year festival, while its midsummer timing may reflect earlier observances linked to the summer solstice and the Mesopotamian deity Dumuzi. Other scholars have similarly argued that the festival, along with related Assyrian customs, preserves aspects of pre-Christian Assyrian culture that were adapted into Christian tradition, serving as a cultural link to the community's ancient heritage.

=== Christian tradition ===
Following the Christianisation of the Assyrians in the 1st century AD, the festival was incorporated into the Assyrian Christian tradition, where the water-sprinkling ritual came to symbolise baptism, particularly the Baptism of Jesus and John the Baptist. According to ecclesiastical tradition, Saint Thomas passed through Urmia, where he baptised large numbers of converts by sprinkling them with water, an event commemorated as Nusardil. Longstanding Assyrian Christian tradition further holds that Thomas later sent Saint Addai to preach Christianity in Beth Nahrain (Mesopotamia), where he likewise baptised the many Syriacs who embraced the faith by sprinkling them with holy water.

One tradition associates Nusardil with the mass baptism of approximately 1.3 million people by Mar Shukha d-Eshoo, a Nestorian bishop, during the era of Genghis Khan in the early 13th century. According to this account, the bishop baptised the converts by sprinkling them with water because of their great number. According to popular belief, the practice commemorates the mass adoption of Christianity, symbolized by baptism, or the abandonment of the cult of fire through its symbolic extinguishing with water. The term Nausardil (Nusardil) also appears in a Syriac document dated 1504, referring to the eighth Sunday after Pentecost, indicating that the name was already established within the liturgical tradition of the Church of the East by the early 16th century. Elements of these purification beliefs have persisted in Assyrian folk tradition, with some Assyrians traditionally running tap water while recounting a bad dream in the belief that the flowing water will carry it away. While rooted in ancient religious and agricultural traditions, Nusardil has evolved into a festive celebration centred on water-splashing, Assyrian music, dancing and communal gatherings, with the water-splashing tradition remaining its defining feature.

=== Etymology ===
According to one interpretation, the name Nusardil is derived from the Assyrian words maryis (/marjis/; "to sprinkle") and il or el (/il/, /el/; "God"), and may be interpreted as "Sprinkling of God", as the d in nusar d'el is the Assyrian preposition meaning "of". Another interpretation suggests that Nusardil is a hybrid term combining Persian and Syriac elements: nausar (from the Persian nauua "new" and sarɛd "year") and the Syriac ܕܐܝܠ (d-īl), yielding the meaning "God's feast". The term also refers to unripe dates.

== Observance ==
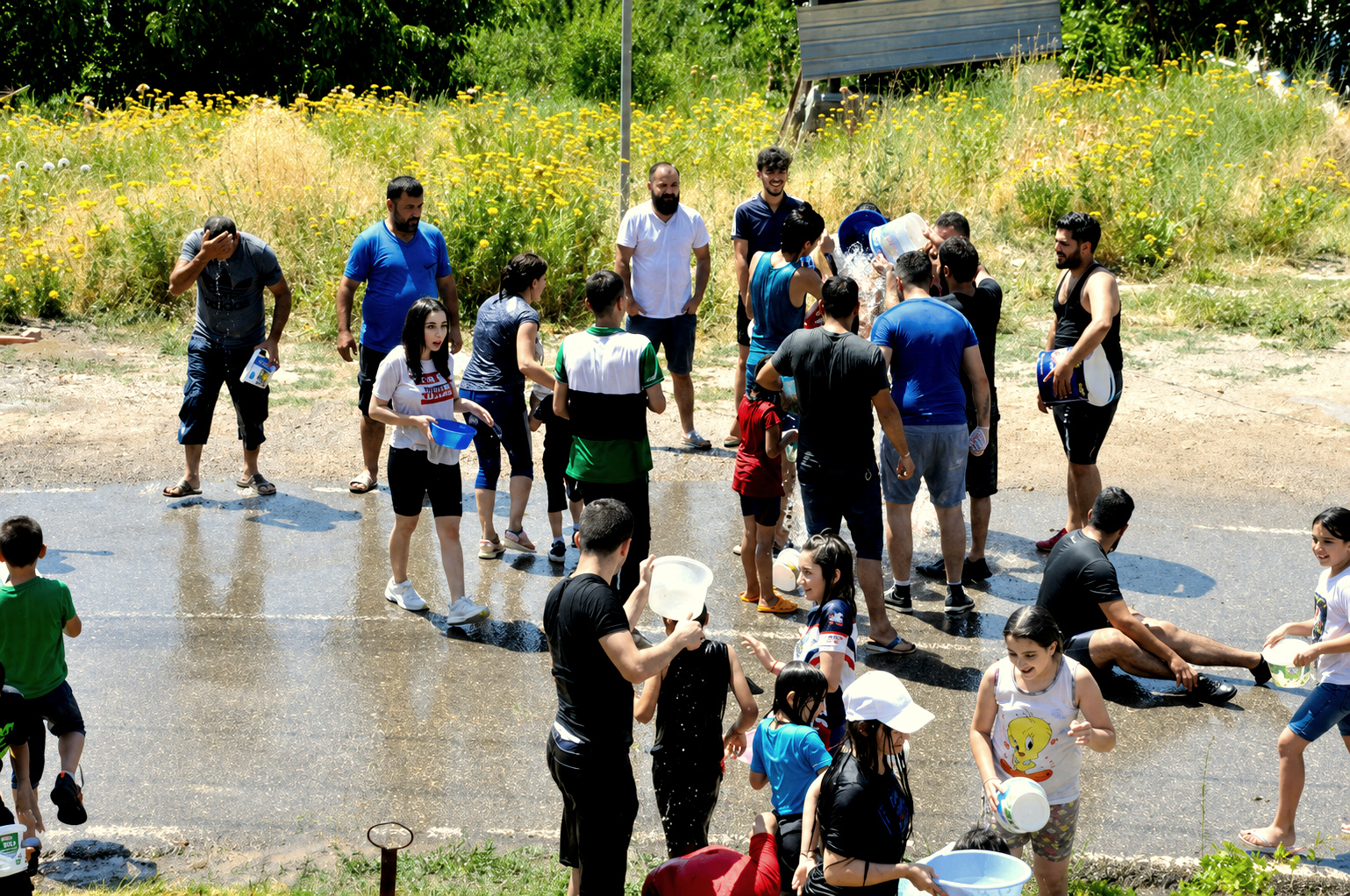
Community members of all ages taking part in the Nusardil celebration

Nusardil is celebrated annually on the seventh Sunday after the Ascension, observed as the Sunday of Penance. Following the Divine Liturgy, participants of all ages gather in church courtyards, streets and homes to sprinkle, splash, spill, or throw water on one another throughout the day as a symbol of baptism, blessing and spiritual renewal. Children frequently participate using squirt guns or similar devices. In the evening, families and communities hold social gatherings featuring traditional Assyrian folk songs, dances and other cultural performances, celebrating the festival's religious and cultural significance.

In parts of the Assyrian homeland, the festival is also traditionally marked by visits to the Tigris and Euphrates rivers, where participants enter or immerse themselves in the water as a symbolic act of restoration. In the United States, Assyrian churches commonly celebrate Nusardil with community picnics, outdoor games and water-splashing ceremonies, complementing the liturgical observance of the festival.

Regarded as one of the distinctive annual festivals of the Assyrian people, the custom remains widespread among Assyrian communities in Iraq, Iran, Syria and throughout the diaspora. Scholars have cited the feast as an example of cultural continuity in which pre-Christian Mesopotamian customs were adapted into the liturgical traditions of Syriac Christianity while retaining aspects of earlier seasonal observances.

== See also ==
- Water Festival
- Śmigus-dyngus
- Easter sprinkling in Hungary
- Vardavar
- Asperges
- Feast of the Ascension
- Kha b-Nisan
- Assyrian culture
