= Pussy willow =

Name for willow trees in early spring

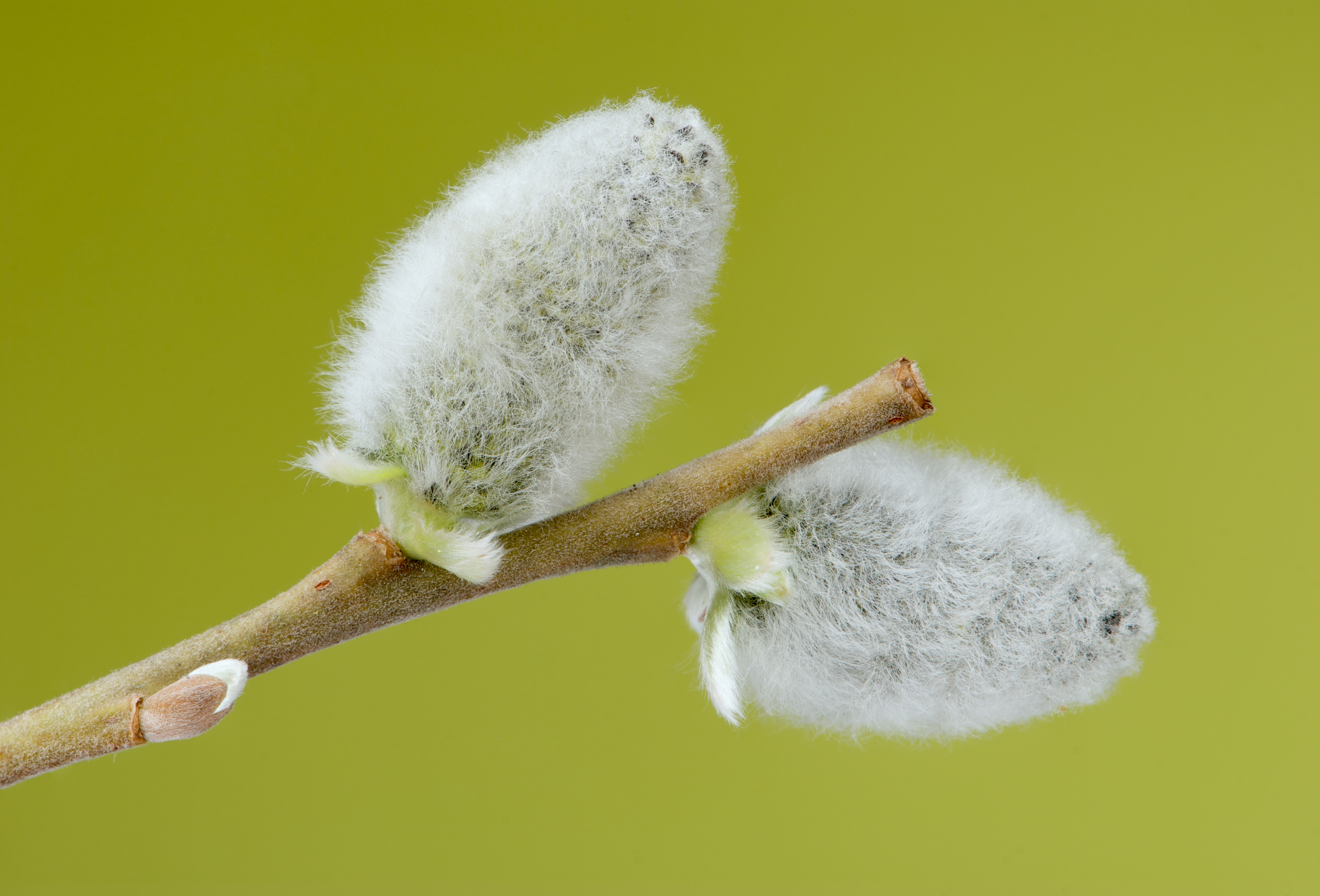
Two flowering male catkins from a goat willow tree (Salix caprea).

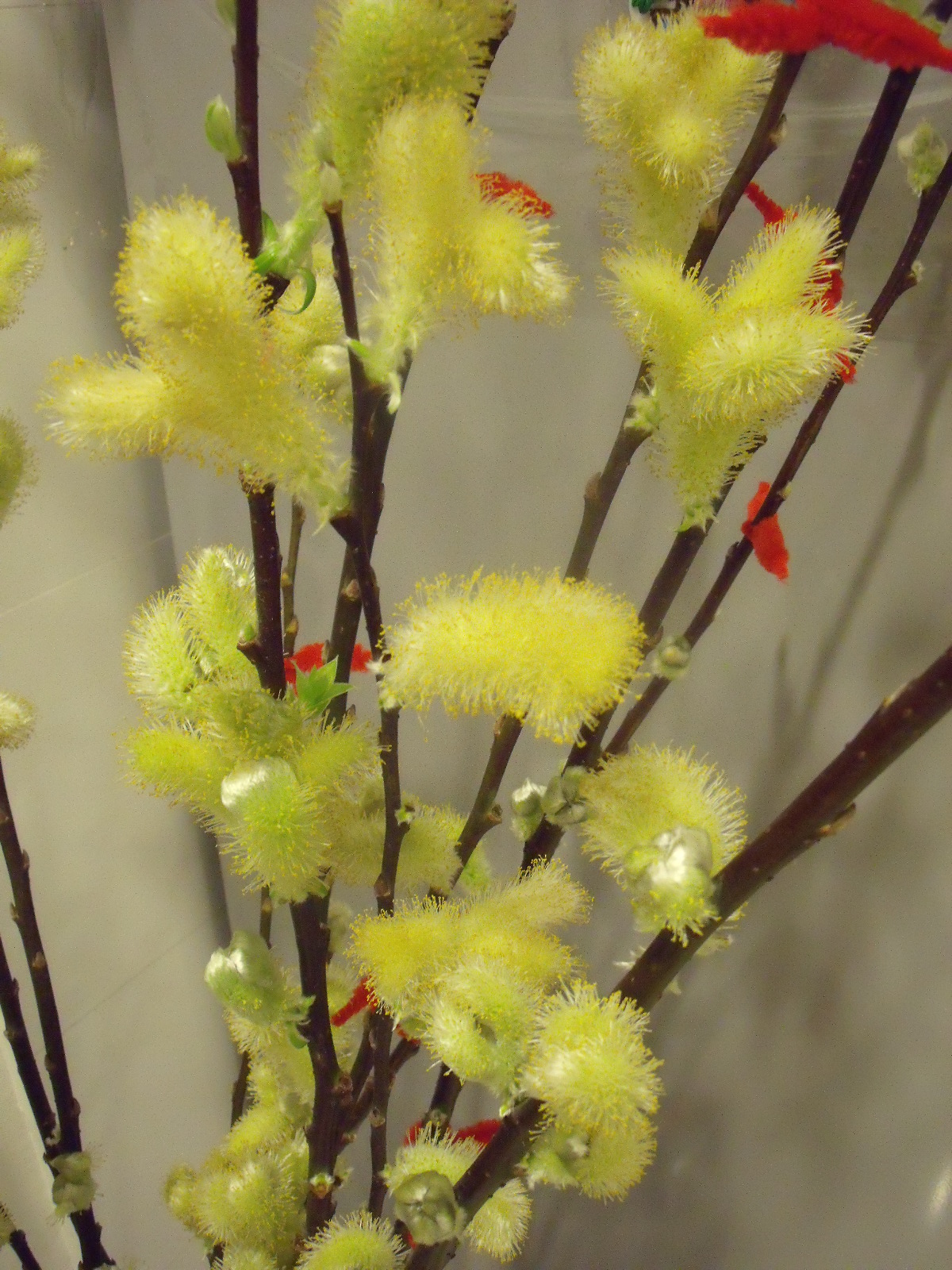
Pussy willow used as Chinese New Year decoration.

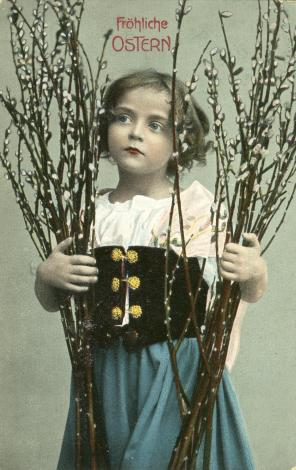
Easter postcard (Germany, 1902)

Pussy willow is a name given to many of the smaller species of the genus Salix (willows and sallows) when their furry catkins are young in early spring. These species include (among many others):

- Goat willow or goat sallow (Salix caprea), a small tree native to Northern Europe and northwest Asia.
- Grey willow or grey sallow (Salix cinerea), a small tree native to Northern Europe.
- American pussy willow (Salix discolor), native to northern North America.

Before the male catkins of these species come into full flower they are covered in fine, greyish fur, leading to a fancied likeness to tiny cats, also known as “pussies”. The catkins appear before the leaves, and are one of the earliest signs of spring. At other times of year, trees of most of these species are usually known by their ordinary names.

== Cultural traditions ==
=== Asia ===
The many buds of the pussy willow make it a favourite flower for Chinese New Year. The fluffy white blossoms of the pussy willow resemble silk, and they soon give forth young shoots the colour of green jade. In Chinese tradition, this represents the coming of prosperity. Towards the Chinese New Year period in spring, stalks of the plant may be bought from wet market vendors or supermarkets.

Once unbundled within one's residence, the stalks are frequently decorated with gold and red ornaments—ornaments with colours and textures that signify prosperity and happiness. Felt pieces of red, pink, and yellow are also a common decoration in Southeast Asia.

Xie Daoyun's comparison of snow and willow catkins is a famous line of poetry and is used to refer to precocious young female poets.

=== Europe ===
The flowering shoots of pussy willow are used both in Europe and America for spring religious decoration on Palm Sunday, as a replacement for palm branches, which do not grow that far north.

Ukrainian and Russian Orthodox; Ruthenian, Polish, Romanian, Bulgarian, Czech, Slovak, Bavarian, and Austrian Roman Catholics; Finnish and Baltic Lutherans and Orthodox; and various other Eastern European peoples carry pussy willows on Palm Sunday instead of palm branches. This custom has continued to this day among Ukrainian Orthodox Church, Romanian Orthodox, Russian Orthodox, Ruthenian Catholic, Ukrainian Catholic, Kashubian Catholic and Polish Catholic émigrés to North America. Sometimes, on Palm Sunday, they will bless both palms and pussy willows in church. The branches will often be preserved throughout the year in the family's icon corner.

Pussy willow also plays a prominent role in Polish Dyngus Day (Easter Monday) observances, continued also among Polish-Americans, especially in the Buffalo, New York, area.

=== Middle East ===
In Greater Iran it may be part of the decoration on the Haft-Seen table during the new year celebration of Nowruz on the first day of spring, and its distilled flower is used in traditional medicine.
