= Icon corner =

Small Christian worship space

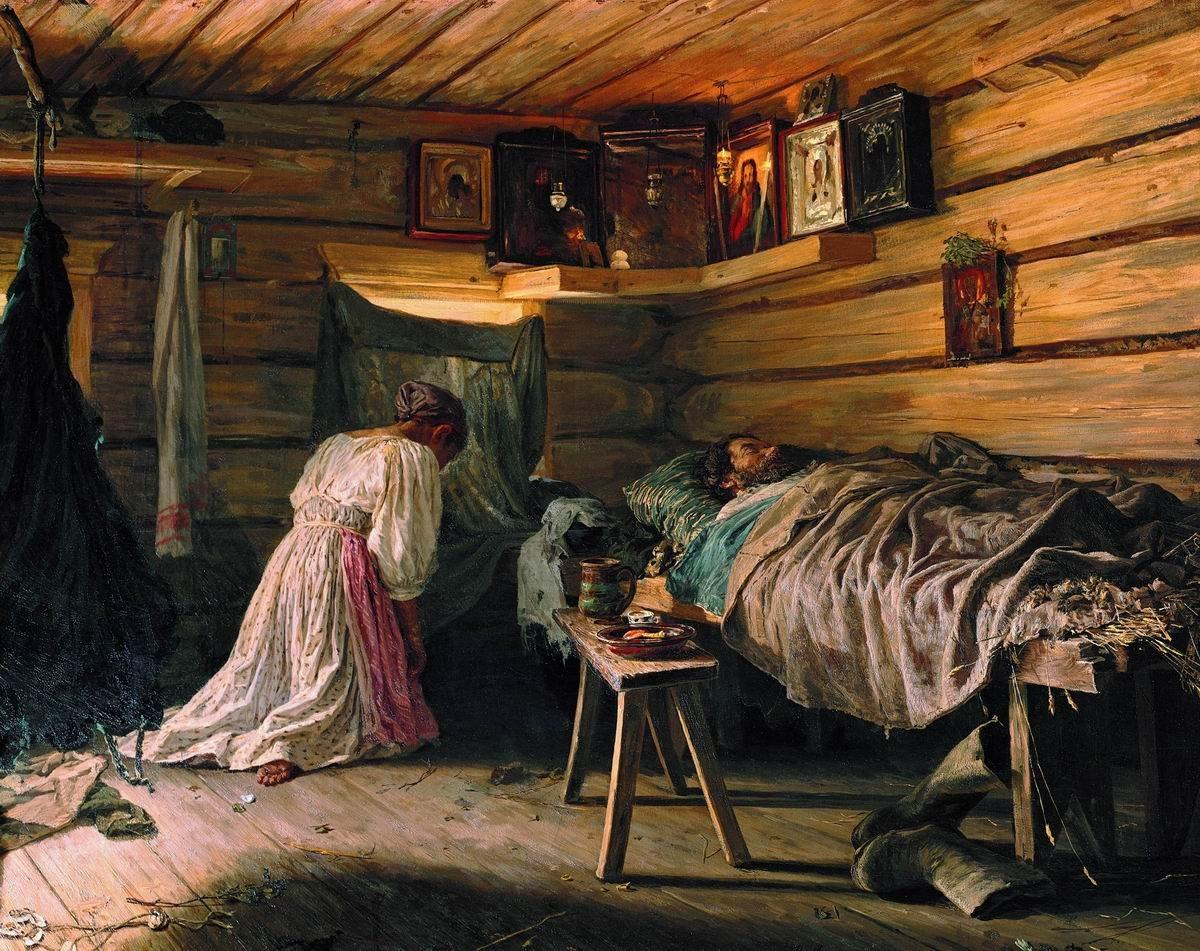
The Sick Man by Vasili Maximov (1881) portrays a woman kneeling in prayer before the icon corner (Tretyakov Gallery, Moscow).

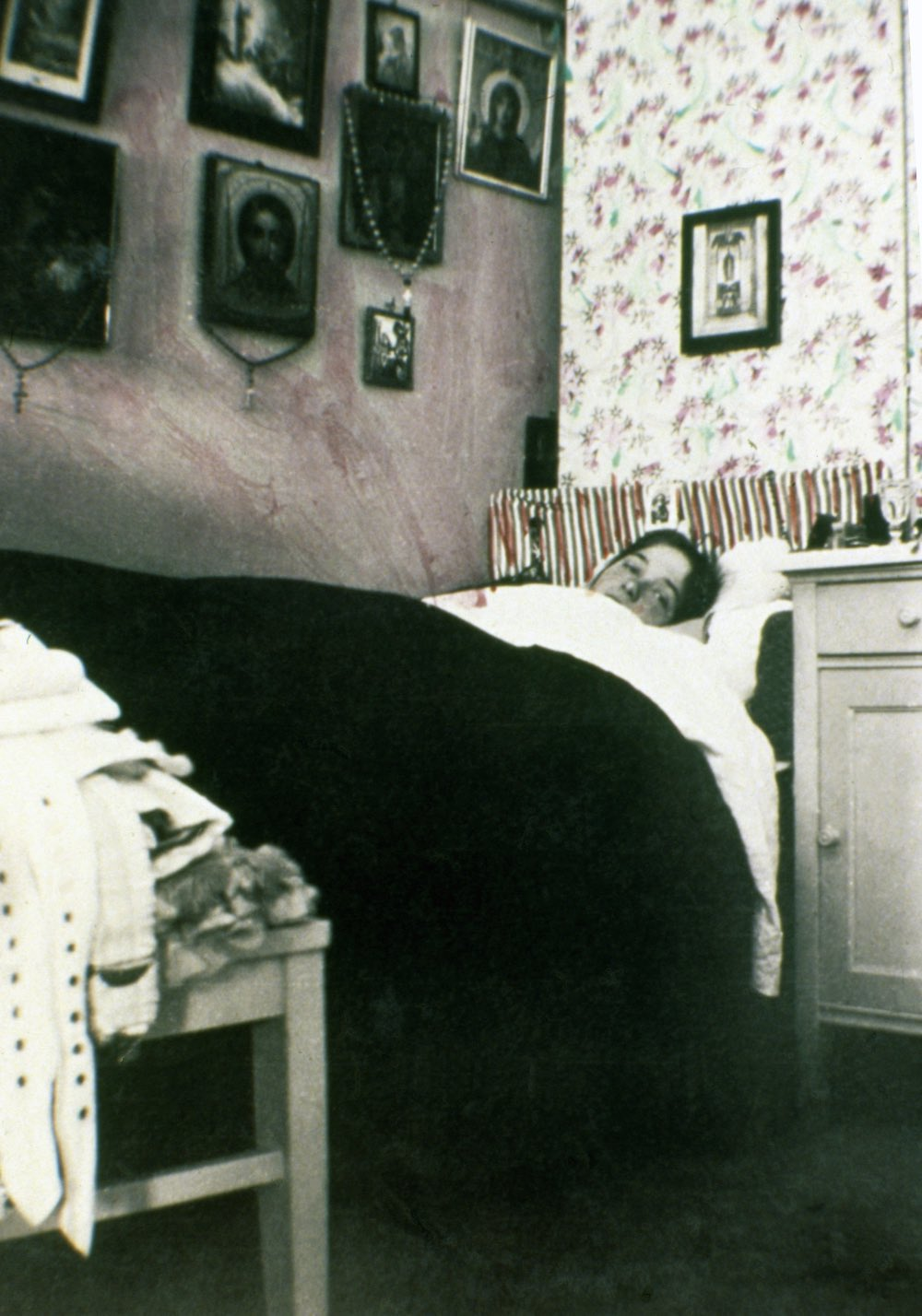
Grand Duchess Olga Nikolaevna of Russia with an icon corner in her bedroom (1915 or 1916, colorized by her sister Maria).

The icon corner, sacred corner or red corner (Greek: εικονοστάσι) is a small Christian worship space prepared in the homes of Eastern Orthodox, Greek-Catholic, Eastern Lutheran and Roman Catholic Christians. The analogous concept in Western Christianity is the home altar.

== History ==
The Book of Acts and the Epistles of the Apostle Paul record that in the early Church, Christians used to meet in the homes of the faithful. (Acts 2:46, Acts 20:7–12, 1 Corinthians 16:19, etc.) This tradition of the House church continues to this day in Eastern Christianity. The home is considered to be a microcosm of the Church. The parents (both the husband and the wife) are the "clergy" of the house church, and the children are the "laity". The wedding ceremony ("crowning") is analogous to Ordination, and the house is blessed with a rite that is based upon the Consecration of a Church. Once a year, the priest will come to bless the house with Theophany Water.

== Background ==
An Orthodox Christian is expected to pray constantly. According to Bishop Kallistos Ware, "[I]n Orthodox spirituality, [there is] no separation between liturgy and private devotion." Thus the house, just like the Temple (church building), is considered to be a consecrated place, and the center of worship in the house is the icon corner.

An icon corner is normally oriented to face east. It is often located in a corner to eliminate worldly distractions and allow prayer to be more concentrated. Here is where the icons that the family owns should be located, normally including at least icons of Christ, the Theotokos, and the Patron Saint(s) of the family. An oil lamp normally hangs in front of the icons. The careful trimming of the lamp to keep it burning at all times is interpreted as symbolic of the attentive daily care faithful Christians should take over their souls. Relics of saints (if the family possesses any) and a Gospel Book and a blessing cross would be kept there, as well as incense, holy water, palms and pussywillow from Palm Sunday, candles from Pascha (Easter), and other sacred items, as well as a personal Commemoration Book (containing the names of family and loved ones, both living and departed, to be remembered in prayer).

Ideally, the icon corner is located so that it is visible when one first enters the house from the main entrance. Traditionally, when first entering the house, an Orthodox Christian would venerate the icons before greeting the members of the house.

A traditional Orthodox family will gather together every day for morning and evening prayers. Sometimes, at the end of the prayers, the head of the household will take the hand censer and cense the icons and all the members of the household.

Often, in addition to the icon corner, a family will hang a small "portal icon" (usually of the Virgin and Christ Child) by the door, which is venerated by family and guests whenever going in or out of the house.

== Sources ==
- Mosio, Grażyna (2012). ""Święty kąt" w chłopskim domu – miejsce, symbolika, funkcja" ["Sacred corner" in peasant house - location, meaning, function] (PDF). Symbol – znak – przesłanie. Wytwory rąk człowieka (in Polish). pp. 149–173.
- Shizhenskiy, Roman (2017). "The role of food in contemporary Russian Paganism". Walking the Old Ways in a New World. Contemporary paganism as lived religion. pp. 161–182.
- Justyna Perkowska; Katarzyna Sawejko; Ewelina Sadowska; Aleksandra Szymańska; Jarosław Szewczyk (2014). ""Pokuć", czyli tradycyjny kąt obrzędowy we wnętrzu wiejskiego domu mieszkalnego na Białostocczyźnie – wyniki badań z lat 2012–2013". Architecturae et Artibus (in Polish). 6 (2): 50–64.
