= Kha b-Nisan =

Assyrian New Year

Kha b' Nisan
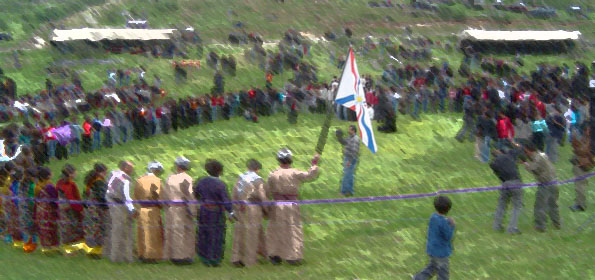
- Kha b' Nisan celebration in Nahla region
- Official name: Syriac: ܚܕ ܒܢܝܣܢ
- Observed by: Assyrian people
- Type: Cultural
- Significance: New Year holiday
- Date: 1 April
- Next time: 1 April 2027
- Related to: Akitu, Seharane, Noruz

Kha b-Nisan, Ha b-Nisin, or Ha b-Nison (Syriac: ܚܕ ܒܢܝܣܢ, "First of April"), also known as Resha d-Sheta (Syriac: ܪܫܐ ܕܫܢܬܐ, "Head of the year"), Akitu (ܐܟܝܬܘ), or Assyrian New Year, is the spring festival among the indigenous Assyrians of northern Iraq, northeastern Syria, southeastern Turkey and northwestern Iran, celebrated on the first day of April.

The festival has its roots in the ancient Mesopotamian religion and its festival of Akitu, which were practiced by Assyrians until the faith's gradual demise in the face of Syriac Christianity between the 1st and 4th centuries AD. Today, Assyrians are predominantly Christian, with most being adherents of the Assyrian Church of the East, Chaldean Catholic Church, Syriac Orthodox Church, Syriac Catholic Church, Ancient Church of the East, Assyrian Pentecostal Church and Assyrian Evangelical Church.

Celebrations involve parades and parties. Some Assyrians wear traditional costumes and dance for hours. Celebrations take place throughout Assyria and other areas in the Middle East, along with some in the United States, Europe, Australia, Canada and the Caucasus among Assyrian diaspora communities. There are often parties with food, music and dancing.

== History ==
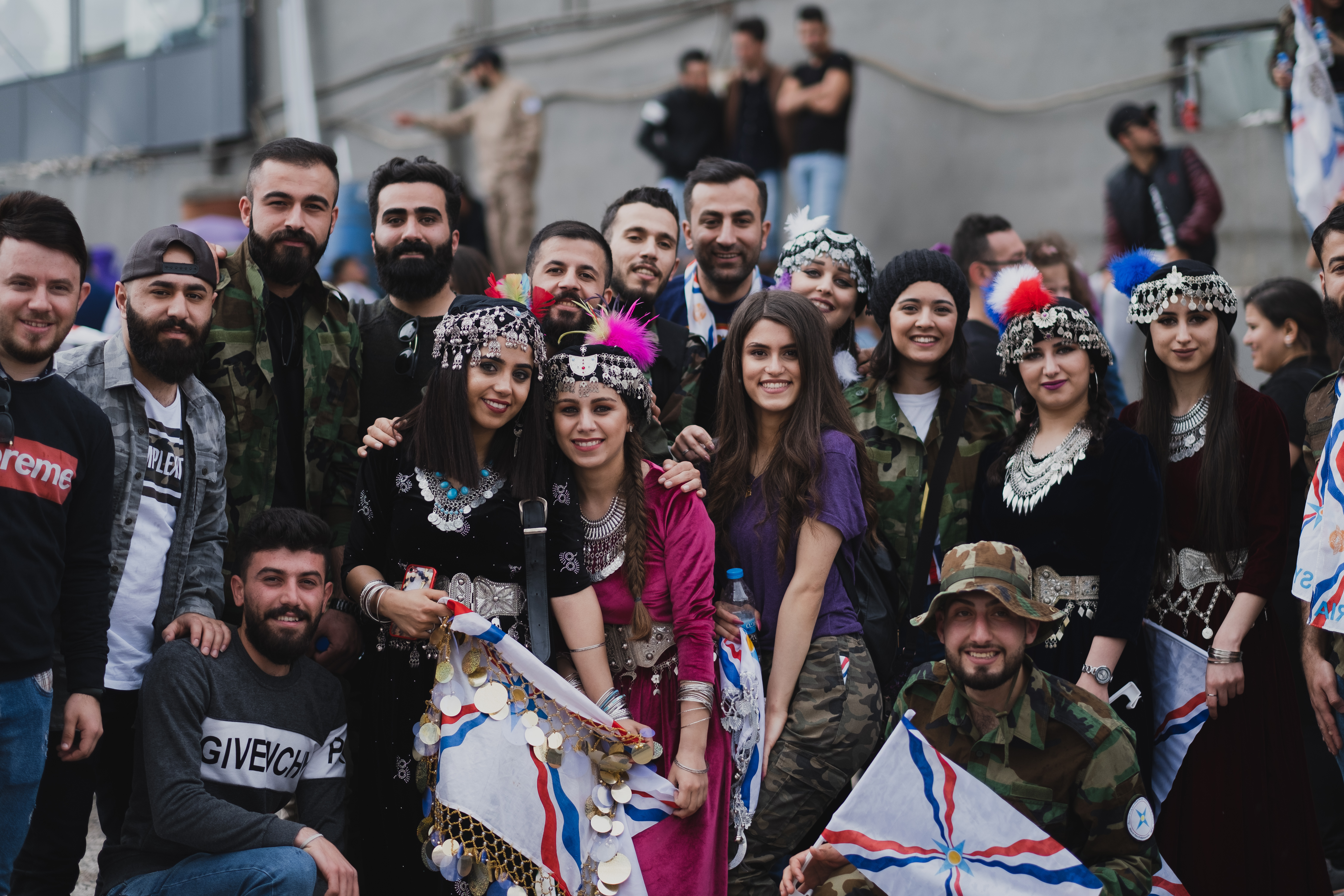
Assyrians celebrating Assyrian New Year (Akitu) 6769 (Nisan, April 1st 2019) in Nohadra (Duhok), Iraq

The month of Nisan was around the time of the vernal equinox, which is around March 21. (In the Hebrew calendar, Nisan may start a couple of weeks before the equinox.) Now the name "Nisan" is used for April, so the first of Nisan is April 1. The Vernal equinox is celebrated throughout Greater Iran as Noruz (meaning "New Day") on 21 March. However, in the ancient Assyrian, Akkadian and Babylonian traditions, the spring festival was celebrated in the first days of the month known as "Nisan" and the calendar adopted by the ancient Assyrians had the month "Nisan" at the beginning of the calendar lending to the term "Kha b-Nisan", or the "first of Nisan".

The modern observance of Akitu began in the 1960s during the Assyrian intellectual renaissance. Due to political oppression, however, the celebrations were largely private until the 1990s.

The event is largely celebrated by Assyrians residing in Syria. Although the Syrian government does not acknowledge the festival, Assyrians still continue with the celebration. In 2002, Assyrians in Syria celebrated the event with a mass wedding of 16 couples and over 25,000 attendees. After the formation of Turkey, Kha b-Nisan along with Nowruz were banned from public celebration. Assyrians in Turkey were first allowed to publicly celebrate Kha b-Nisan in 2005, after organizers received permission from the government to stage the event, in light of democratic reforms adopted in support of Turkey's EU membership bid. Around 5,000 people "including large groups of visiting ethnic Assyrians from Europe, Syria and Iraq" took part in the Kha b-Nisan celebrations.

One of the largest Assyrian New Year celebrations took place in Iraq in 2008. Public celebrations were not allowed by Saddam Hussein's regime prior to the start of the Iraq war. The event was organized by the Assyrian Democratic Movement (Zowaa) and between 45,000 and 65,000 people took part in the parade.

In 2004, Hon. George Radanovich of the California State Assembly recognized the Assyrian New Year and extended his wishes to the Assyrian community in California. This was later followed by a letter from the California governor, Arnold Schwarzenegger, to the Assyrian community in California, congratulating them on the annual celebration.

In 2020 festivities were cancelled in northeastern Syria due to the COVID-19 pandemic.

== Celebration ==
Assyrians celebrate Kha b-Nisan by holding social events including parades and parties. They also gather in clubs and social institutions and listen to the poets who recite the story of creation. Those celebrating wear traditional clothes and poppies. Some people will dress up as ancient Assyrian royalty. People greet each other by saying Reesh Shato Brikhto, Reesha D’Sheeta Brikhta or Akitu Breekha.

Due to its modern alignment with April Fool's Day, the festival is often more lighthearted than its historical counterpart.

It is a tradition in Assyrian villages for girls to gather flowers and herbs which are then suspended under the house's roof or made into a garland for a home's front door. The bunches are referred to as "Deqna d-Nisan" (ܕܩܢܐ ܕܢܝܣܢ), meaning "the beard of April/Spring".

Newer traditions have also arisen in diaspora communities. The Assyrian community in Yonkers, New York has a tradition of raising the Assyrian flag in front of City Hall on April 1. In Chicago, Illinois, it has also become tradition to hold a parade down King Sargon Boulevard.

== Image gallery ==
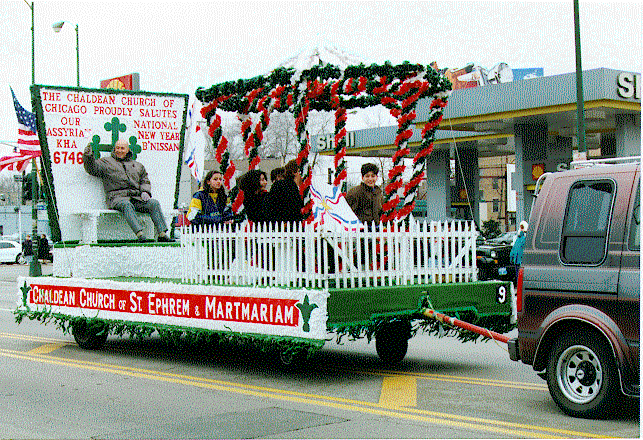
Chaldean Church float in Assyrian New Year parade in Chicago, IL

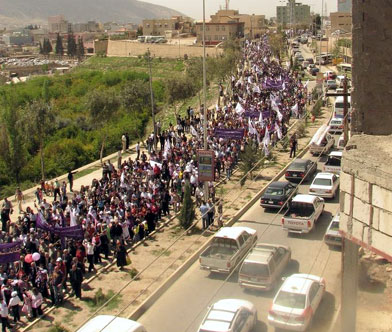
Assyrian New Year in Nohadra (Duhok), Iraq in 2008

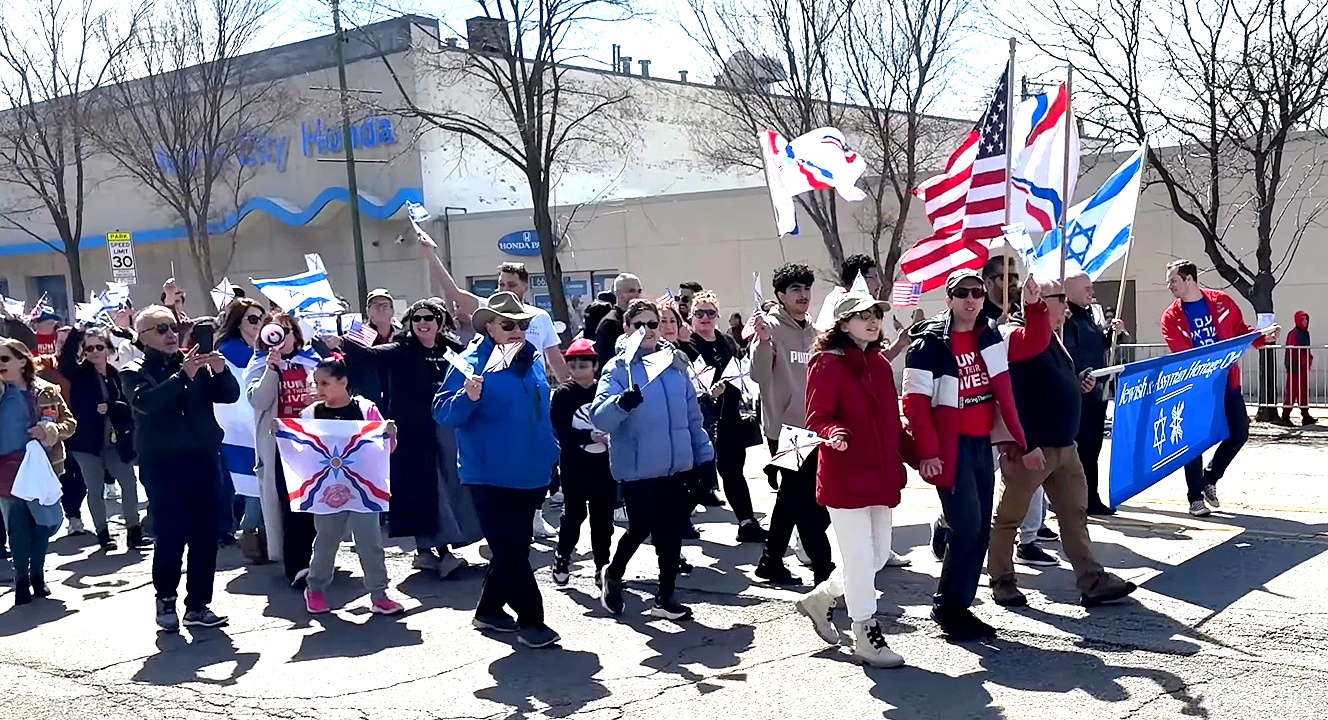
Assyrian Americans marching in solidarity with Jews in the Assyrian New Year Parade, Chicago, 2025

== See also ==
- Assyria
- Akitu
- Nowruz
- Nusardil
- Sham el-Nessim

== Sources ==
- Laing-Marshall, Andrea (2005). "Assyrians". Encyclopedia of the World's Minorities. Vol. 1. New York-London: Routledge. pp. 149–150. ISBN 9781135193881.
