= St. Barbara Church (Cleveland) =

St. Barbara's Church
- Location within Ohio
- 41.45148°N 81.69134°W
- Location: Cleveland, Ohio
- Country: United States
- Denomination: Roman Catholic Church

History
- Status: Parish church
- Dedication: St. Barbara

Architecture
- Functional status: Active
- Heritage designation: Cleveland Designated Landmark
- Architect: H. C. Gabele
- Architectural type: Church

Administration
- Province: Cincinnati
- Diocese: Cleveland

Clergy
- Pastor: Rev. Fr. Joseph T. Hilinski

St. Barbara Catholic Church (Polish: Parafia św. Barbary w Cleveland) is a parish of the Roman Catholic Church in Cleveland, Ohio, within the Diocese of Cleveland. The parish church is located on Denison Ave. between West 16th St. and the southbound entrance to SR 176, in a part of the Brooklyn Centre neighborhood previously known in Polish as na Barbarowie.

The red brick parish church, designed by H.C. Gabele, is a local landmark. It is a GNIS named feature. The church, rectory and convent buildings are listed together as a Cleveland Designated Landmark.

The parish was established in 1905.

== History ==
=== Closure controversy ===
On 4 April 2006, titular Bishop Richard Lennon was appointed Bishop of Cleveland by Pope Benedict XVI. In 2009, Bishop Lennon undertook a massive downsizing, ordering the closing of 50 parishes throughout the diocese, citing demographic shifts, the ongoing priest shortage, and maintenance costs. This led to outcry, however, not only from parishioners but from civil authorities.

The suppression of 13 of the closed parishes, among them St. Barbara's, was reversed in a ruling by the Congregation for the Clergy announced 7 March 2012. The Associated Press reported on the importance of this church to the inner city neighborhood.

On 12 March 2012, the Diocesan Department of Communications announced that, "The Diocese has not formally received from the Vatican any decrees from the Congregation of Clergy concerning parish appeals; subsequently, no response is available at this time." On 14 March 2012, Lennon, through a press release from the Diocesan Department of Communications announced that, "As indicated in my previous statement, I promised to inform you when I had received from the Vatican Congregation for Clergy decrees associated with parish appeals. The decrees arrived on Wednesday, March 14, 2012. The process to review these rulings will now be undertaken with my advisors." He further announced, on 27 March 2012, that, "With the help of a number of advisors – including members of the clergy, laity and experts in church law – I am carefully studying and seeking to fully understand the decrees. I can assure you that this is not nearly as clear-cut as it may appear on the surface. Although the decrees are brief in length, they are deep in underlying meaning and I continue to receive significant input and clarification."

St. Barbara was among eleven parishes re-established in 2012. On 27 June 2012, Lennon announced the appointment of Father Joseph Hilinski as Pastor.

The first Mass since the reopening of the church was celebrated Sunday, 22 July 2012.

== Priests ==
Assigned Priests
Start	End	Name	Surname	Position
16 July 2012	--	Joseph T.	Hilinski	Pastor
2 November 2007	9 May 2010	Lucjan	Stokowski	Administrator
31 October 1997	--	Chester C.	Cudnik	Pastor Emeritus
31 October 1997	2007	Michael	Dyrcz	Administrator
28 July 1970	31 October 1997	Chester C.	Cudnik	Pastor
10 June 1965	1 September 1970	Thaddeus M.	Swirski	Parochial Vicar
12 June 1958	29 August 1963	Chester C.	Cudnik	Parochial Vicar
--	--			
--	--			
