= KTU 1.41 =

KTU 1.41 or the Ugaritic Vintage Rites (CAT 1.87 COS 1.95) describe an extensive Ugaritic ritual. It may have been a new year's event. Twice-attested, it was likely canon. It's something of a new moon, New Year occasion like the Hebrew Feast of Wine. The "Lady of the temples" refers to the goddess, but as written it could also entail respect for the human priestess of her house.

== Lyrics ==
1 In the month of Rišn

2 On to the new moon, cutting the grape cluster

3 To Il - šlmm offerings

4 On the thirteenth, the pure king bathes himself

5 On the fourteenth: First of the tribute

6 And two small animals for the Lady of the temples,

7 Birds for the staff of gods

1 b yrh . riš yn . b ym . hdt]

2 šmtr . [utkl . il . šlmm]

3 b tltt 'šrt[. yrths . mlk . brr]

4 b arb't [. 'šrt . riš . argmn]

5 w tn šm . l[ b'lt . bhtm . 'srm . l inš]

6 ilm . wšdd . ilš š . ilhm . mlk

7 ytb . brr [.] w mhy x w qra

8 ym . 'lm . y'rb t

9 k 'gml [.]xs . w [.] x x [ dqtm]

10 w yn[t . q]rt . y'db l 'nt ]

== See also ==
- Feast of Wine
- Papyrus Amherst 63

== Bibliography ==
- Lete, Gregorio del Olmo; Sanmartín, Joaquín (2004). A Dictionary of the Ugaritic Language in the Alphabetic Tradition. Vol. 67. Leiden: Brill. ISBN 90-04-13694-0.
