= Assyrian National Broadcasting =

Private television broadcasting company

ANB SAT ܦܪܣܬܐ ܐܘܡܬܢܝܬܐ ܐܫܘܪܝܬܐ
- Country: United States
- Headquarters: San Jose, California

Programming
- Language: Assyrian

History
- Launched: August 8, 2011
- Founder: Ninos Ternian

Links
- Website: www.anbsat.com

Assyrian National Broadcasting (Syriac: ܦܪܣܬܐ ܐܘܡܬܢܝܬܐ ܐܫܘܪܝܬܐ), also known as ANB Sat, is a private television broadcasting company for the Assyrian community, available for viewing on the internet or through satellite. The channel was founded in 2011 by Ninos Ternian in order to preserve and extend the reach of Assyrian heritage, culture, and language. The channel was closed in 2021 before reopening two years later.

== History ==
Assyrian National Broadcasting was founded in 2011 by Ninos Ternian, an Assyrian entrepreneur and self-proclaimed Assyrian nationalist. Ternian had founded the channel in order to serve the Assyrian community and diaspora by creating a bridge between these communities, while preserving Assyrian culture, language, and heritage without religious, political, or any affiliation otherwise. The channel was also noted to have played a positive impact, giving Assyrian humanitarian organizations and business owners a voice to discuss developments in the community.

ANB reported on several diaspora events, such as an Assyrian festival in Turlock and the funeral of former Catholicos-Patriarch of the Assyrian Church of the East Dinkha IV. The channel has also reported on human rights violations that Assyrians face in Iraq, particularly in the Kurdish region.

== Controversy ==
In November 2019, William Bnyameen Adam, who was on reporting duty in Rojava, was detained by the Asayish forces in Zakho, Iraqi Kurdistan after traveling to a Peshmerga-run checkpoint through a smuggler. Adam had been contributing to ANB since 2014 and was reporting on the situation of Assyrians in the Al-Hasakah Governorate and Qamishli. He had previously been threatened by the Kurdistan Democratic Party for criticizing the appointment of two Assyrians to senior government positions. He was released on November 12th following negotiations, but had endured tough conditions and beatings by Asayish officers.

ANB had previously been unable to broadcast in the autonomous Kurdistan Region in northern Iraq, until it had received a license to do so in Ankawa, Erbil in June 2020. On October 26th of that year, Asayish captain Sangar Ahmed forced the channel to close its operations. The channel complied and stated that it was forced to close due to its criticism of the Barzani family, the 2017 Kurdistan Region independence referendum, and using the term "northern Iraq" to reference the KRI. The situation occurred around the time of a huge crackdown on journalists in the KRI, irrespective of ethnicity.

== Closure and reopening ==
In October 2021, it was announced that the channel would be permanently closed after several issues maintaining its status, especially following the KRG closure. At some point, however, the channel reopened and continues in its original goal of broadcasting information for the Assyrian community.

In 2026, the group temporarily stopped publishing news to their Facebook page as a result of a dispute with their trademark.

== See also ==
- Ishtar TV
- Suroyo TV
- Suryoyo Sat
- KBSV
