= Azadoota =

Australian worldbeat band

Azadoota ܐܵܙܵܕܘܼܬܵܐ
- Logo for the band

Background information
- Origin: Sydney, Australia
- Genres: Assyrian music; World music; Latin pop; Salsa music; Latin rock; Folk
- Years active: 1996–present
- Labels: Independent
- Members: Robin Zirwanda; Josh Zirwana; Danny John; Sachin John; Dave Howell
- Website: www.azadoota.com

Azadoota (Syriac: ܐܵܙܵܕܘܼܬܵܐ, lit. 'Freedom') is an Australian worldbeat band formed in 1996 in Sydney, New South Wales. Represented by traditional costumes worn in the ancient Assyrian royal court, Azadoota is the only modern Assyrian act to target their presentations specifically to mainstream audiences. The band performs original Assyrian music which the members describe as "contemporary Assyrian dance-rock worldbeat", combining styles of popular music (ex. Latin music) with the Assyrian lore provides the band's music a quality where listeners can relate to. Its founder/lead singer, Robin Zirwanda, writes and sings the songs in Assyrian Neo-Aramaic.

== Name ==
The word "Azadoota" means "freedom", and is borrowed from the Persian āzād. Regarding the name of the band, Zirwandahas stated that it represents the freedom that Assyrians in Australia have to be able to express themselves through music. The term, however, is not linguistically part of Assyrian Neo-Aramaic.

== History ==
Azadoota's lead singer and founder, Robin Haider Zirwanda, was born in Habbaniyah in 1953. He was raised by his grandparents in Dora, Baghdad, and his father, Awimalk Haider, was a soccer player who played alongside other well known players like Ammo Baba. He would work full time at the Embassy of the United States in Baghdad while playin guitar at nightclubs. He had an interest in music from a young age, often playing a number of instruments that were in his home, but especially the drums. He migrated to Australia unaccompanied in 1971 after getting papers organized in Kuwait, without knowledge of English. After his family arrived, they settled in Arnhem Land in the town of Nhulunbuy; Zirwanda had initially aspired to be a football player earlier in his career.

Zirwanda then joined a band and formed a close bond with the indigenous community there. After relocating to Sydney in the 1980s, he worked as a percussionist in the cabaret scene and also with original bands on the pub circuit. In the earlier days of his career, Zirwanda would sing his father's songs. In the 1990s, Zirwanda began to notice the rising popularity of world music and wanted to contribute with his native Assyrian Neo-Aramaic. In 1996, the band was first formed, containing members from the Netherlands to Argentina, combining Latin American music (which he took inspiration from earlier in his career) and harmony spanning across musical genres and global cultures. The band's first gig being held in Byron Bay.

The band released the album “Planetarian” in 2008 and “Beyond Bridges” in 2011. In recent years, their songs contain messages of preserving Assyrian culture for future generations. “Lishana”, which came out in 2015, became a moderate success among the Assyrian diaspora. Similar messages were found in "Mazreta" and "Unity". On January 20, 2019, the band released a music video for their 2008 song "Bruni" (included on "Planetarian"), with the location of the featured castle being the Lantarnam Hall in Los Altos, California. The video shows an Assyrian mother treating her son like a literal king, inspired by a phone call that the band's drummer at the time, Evan Yako, received.

== Concerts ==
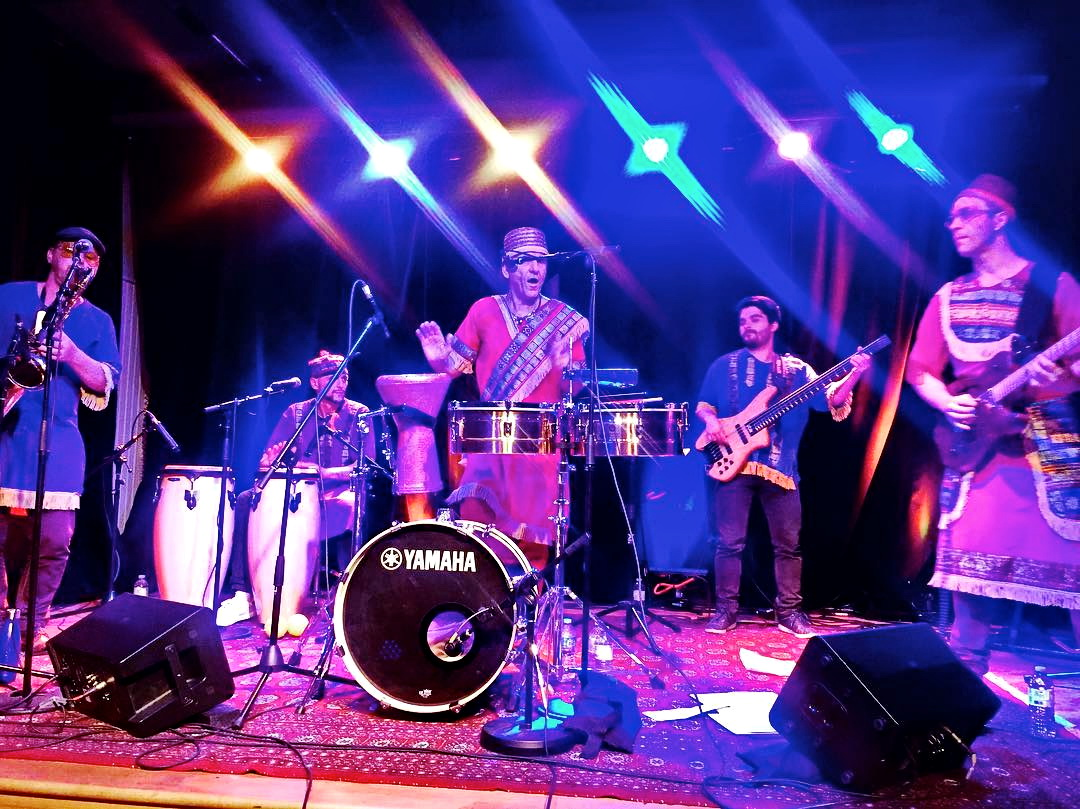
Azadoota performing in Toronto, Canada.

The band has regularly performed at a diverse range of venues, from bush halls and pubs to larger events such as festivals. Zirwanda has previously stated that festivals present good opportunities for them to represent Assyrian culture and identity to many different people. Azadoota has most notably performed at WOMADelaide in 2014 and Woodford Folk Festival in 2016. In August 2018, the band toured North America for the first time, visiting the United States and Canada. The band regularly performs at the Assyrian New Year festival in Fairfield Showground in Sydney each April.

In 2022, the band performed as part of the City of Canterbury Bankstown's "Homelands Bankstown" festival, bringing awareness to refugees in Australia. In 2024, the band performed at the Power Up Festival in Sydney. In 2025, the band performed at the National Multicultural Festival in Canberra, performing many of their recent singles.

== Musical style ==
The band makes use of a horn section, rhythm guitar, brass instruments, guira and tambourine. The band may also use rhythms of Assyrian folk music (each associated with Assyrian folk dance), whilst presenting them in contemporary arrangements. A merengue groove is also used. Robin Zirwanda fronts the band with timbales and doumbek, usually switching casually from Cuban rhythms to those of his ethnicity. Azadoota's music spans genres and generations, with diverse music styles – from percussive-heavy dance tunes inspired by Caribbean music genres, funk, folk rock, jazz fusion and reggae, to sentimental ballads.

According to the band's lead singer, the horn section indicates a revival of Assyrian culture and a resistance of the destruction occurring in their ancestral lands. Azadoota performs in attire inspired by their ancient royal ancestors, such as Ashurbanipal, Ashurnasirpal I and Nebuchadnezzar – which would showcase a flamboyant sight and also inspires discussion on themes of Assyrian heritage, musical history and cultural continuity. About the band's style, Zirwanda states:

We use contemporary instrumentation with traditional Assyrian rhythms and song-forms, but because I'm a percussionist by trade I find there's a fair bit of Latin and Afro-Cuban influence in my songwriting...I sing about my homeland Iraq, about belonging to a nation without a land, about family and of course about love. Most [of our] songs are upbeat and danceable, with a positive message.

Regarding his skills, Zirwanda states, “When you’re in percussion, you learn all the rhythms: congo, rumba. I’d be tapping on the kitchen table, then I’d start singing a song, and I’d write it that way.” The band's front man Zirwanda cites Youssou N'Dour, Salif Keita and Santana as his influence, and as well as his father. Triple J likens their musical style to Shakira and The Cat Empire. Zirwanda has oftentimes been assisted by his father with the band's songwriting, as he didn't grow up fluently understanding the language.

== Band members ==
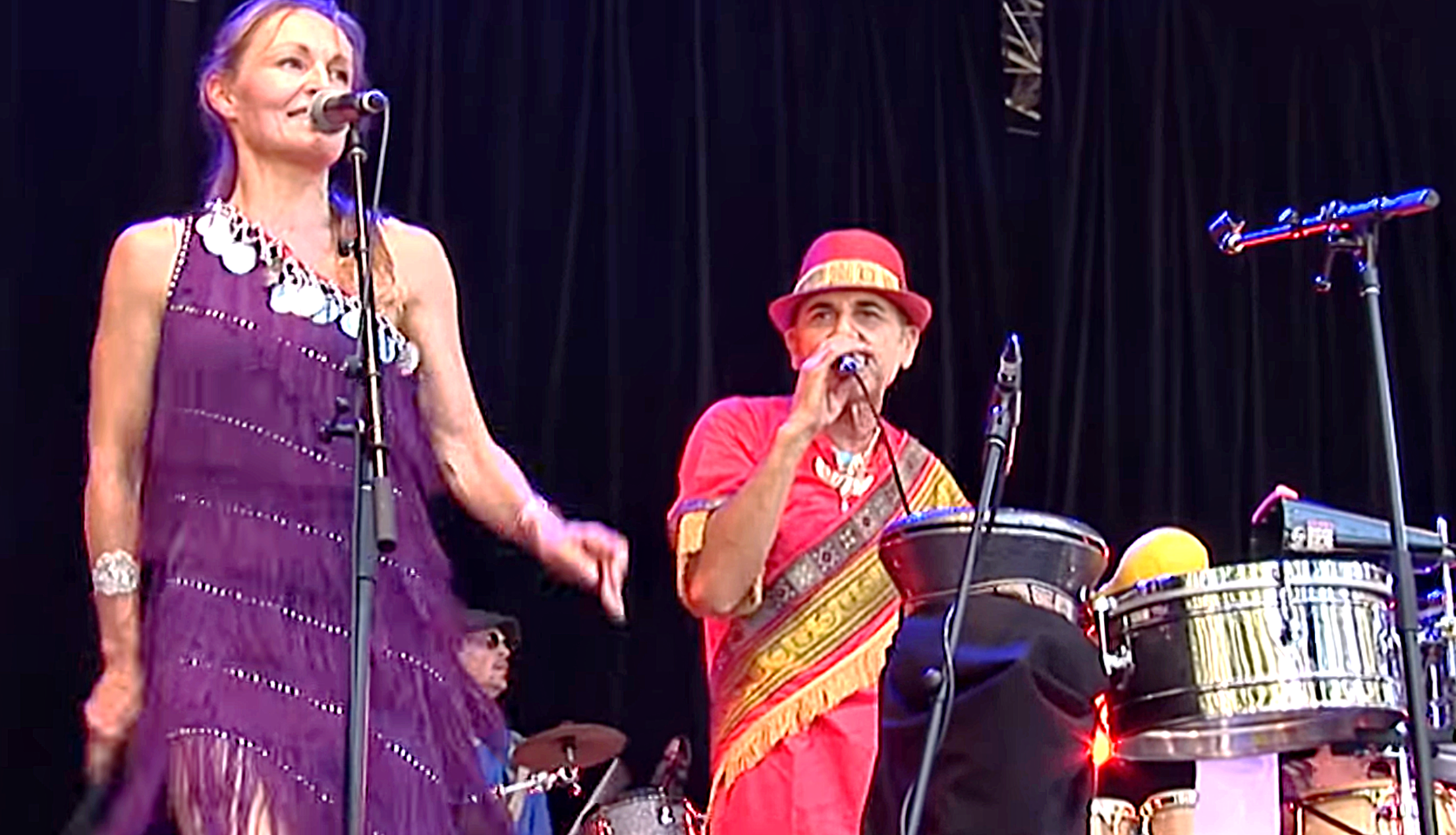
The band performing at WOMADelaide in Adelaide, 2014, with extra backup singer Tatyana Dunlop.

The band members of Azadoota have shifted over the years. The following is a list of current performers of Azadoota:

- Robin Zirwanda – front man, timbales, doumbek, and songwriter (1996 – present)
- Josh Zirwana
- Danny John
- Sachin John
- Dave Howell

Several artists have casually filled in the spots of the above members, were past members, or have simply served as additional musicians for the band past and present:

- Stuart Vandegraaff – saxophone
- Murat Kucukarslan – bass guitar
- Daniel Holmes – guitar
- Paris Freed – backup singer
- Chris Fields – drums
- Nick Ciccarelli and Marty Farrugia – trumpets
- Ben Samuels – saxophone and clarinet
- Nick Ujhazy – guitar
- Tatyana Dunlop – backing vocals and keyboard
- Ben Wild – bass guitar
- Vashti Sivell – piano
- Chris Fields and Steve Marin – drums

== Impact ==
The band's music served as inspiration for Assyrian American comedian Ramina Odicho, who had begun making TikTok videos and songs during the COVID-19 pandemic. Odicho had made a parody of Azadoota's "Brati", which pokes fun at Assyrian mother's emphasis on their sons over their daughters. The band's album covers, specifically that of Lishana, have also received positive attention.

Zirwanda has expressed his gratitude for non-Assyrians listening to Azadoota's music, stating: “It’s unbelievable; the Aussies buy your CDs, come to your gigs, and pay to see you sing in Assyrian.” Zirwanda often selects songs on a basis when performing for non-Assyrians, emphasizing honesty and emotion in his performances. On performing at concerts and festivals, Zirwanda states:

Performing at festivals is a big deal for us, because we represent such a little known-nation. We are the only band in the world performing Assyrian music on the mainstream stage, so we carry a great responsibility to spread awareness of culture and the issues facing our people in the global community. Festivals offer us a valuable opportunity to do this. Compared to 20 years ago, I think the audiences now are much more receptive to global music.

== Discography ==
=== Albums ===
- Planetarian (2008)
- Beyond Bridges (2011)

=== Singles ===
- Lishana (Jesus Spoke My Language) (2015)
- Mazreta (Spinning Top) (2017)
- Unity (2018)
- Shinneh (Years) (2018)
- Bruni (My Son) (2019)

=== Extended plays ===
- Makhdi (1997)
