= Ramina Odicho =

Assyrian-American comedian

Ramina Odicho ܪܡܝܢܐ ܥܒܕܝܫܘܥ
- Born: Chicago, Illinois, U.S.

Comedy career
- Years active: 2020 - present
- Medium: Instagram; TikTok; Stand-up comedy
- Genres: stand-up comedy; Character comedy; Heritage comedy; Comedy music; sarcasm
- Subjects: Assyrian culture; Southwestern Asia; everyday life; relationships; family; religion

Ramina Odicho (Syriac: ܪܡܝܢܐ ܥܒܕܝܫܘܥ), also known by her pseudonym Ramina Rated, is an Assyrian American comedian and influencer. Odicho has used her platform as a place to express her appreciation of Assyrian culture, and speak out on issues affecting the Assyrian and Middle Eastern communities.

Primarily recognized for her characters Yome and Yasmine, as well as for her multicultural reach, Odicho is considered to be one of the well-known Assyrian comedians in the diaspora.

== Early life ==
Ramina Odicho was the middle child in her Assyrian family, who immigrated to the U.S. from Syria. She grew up in a religious and family-oriented environment, was particularly close to her family and cousins, and was involved in her church youth group. She graduated with a master's in teaching English and taught at a high school level for eight years until her comedy career began to take off. She has previously been involved with the Assyrian community outside of religious activities, such as becoming a sponsor of her former Assyrian club at Niles West High School.

== Career ==
Odicho had been inspired to start making TikTok videos around the COVID-19 pandemic, when the app was beginning to increase in popularity. She then began to dedicate more time to creating comedic videos on Assyrian culture. She had also been inspired to make songs at the same time, inspired by the song Broni by Azadoota.

Odicho stated in 2022 that she doesn't like to use her comedy to speak up on much larger issues, and often keeps to raising awareness of Assyrians and her culture to her larger audience. Her family initially was opposed to her comedic career until they saw her successful growth on social media and the influence she was having on her community. Odicho has also described the surreal feeling that she has experienced being an influencer in her community, and the reactions she has gotten since her rise to fame. This has caused her to begin experiencing periods of stress when producing comments, and she has previously discussed how her new career in comedy began symptoms of depression.

Odicho often utilizes people she knows in her real life as inspirations for her characters, most noticeably Yome, who represents the universal Assyrian mom. She considers herself tough when it comes to critiquing her material, initially not considering stage comedy due to stage fright and difficulties approaching people in the crowd. She has previously performed in Detroit where she experienced these issues, but held a successful performance at the end.

In March 2023, Odicho held her first performance in Australia, in the Bankstown suburb of Sydney. She had previously performed for organizations such as the Assyrian Aid Society of America.

== Personal life ==
Odicho is bilingual in English and Spanish, and can also speak a varying amount of Assyrian Neo-Aramaic. She has cited her family and comedian Russell Peters as her biggest influences.
