= Assyria Liberation Party =

Assyrian nationalist political party

Assyria Liberation Party ܓܒܐ ܕܦܘܪܩܢܐ ܕܐܬܘܪ
- Founded: June 15, 1995
- Headquarters: Sweden
- Ideology: Assyrian nationalism

Website
- Archived 2018-08-08 at the Wayback Machine

The Assyria Liberation Party (Syriac: ܓܒܐ ܕܦܘܪܩܢܐ ܕܐܬܘܪ, romanized: Gabo D'Furqono Othur) is an Assyrian political party based in Sweden. The party was founded in 1995 on the principles of Assyrian nationalism and the creation of an independent, sovereign state for Assyrians.

The party's main support comes from Assyrian emigrants in the diaspora, and it has previously taken part in several conferences and discussions that advocated for greater awareness of Assyrians as well as initiatives aimed at their security and preserving their future.

== History ==
In Surayt, the word Furqono (Syriac: ܦܘܪܩܢܐ) translates to "liberation" or "salvation".

The Assyria Liberation Party was first founded on June 15, 1995. The party was founded with the aim of establishing an independent Assyrian state incorporating parts of southeastern Turkey, northeastern Syria and northern Iraq. Naures Atto argues that the formation of the party served to fill the gap in European politics that had been left open by the Assyrian naming dispute, and the institutionalization of separate Assyrian and Aramean identities in Sweden.

== Activities ==
Starting in July 1997, GFA had begun to publish its own bi-monthly Magazine titled Furqono. On March 4th, 2000, the party had also began a television station called "Assyria TV", but due to a lack of donations, it closed within the same year. The TV station is said to be the first all-Assyrian satellite station that was opened in Sweden, predating the current Assyria TV as well as Suroyo TV and Suryoyo Sat.

During a congress in November 2001, GFA affirmed its stance for a free and independent Assyria and condemned what they described as "the anti-Assyrian policy of the Arab, Turkish, and Kurdish governments. Taking part in a conference in Baghdad to discuss Assyrians in Iraq, the party mentioned the various aspects of the naming dispute in calling for separation between church and state. They also took part in many different interviews discussing the situation of Assyrians in Syria in the context of the Syrian civil war and rising sectarian violence.

The party also had an International Seyfo Committee, where they urged reparations towards descendants of those who had perished in the Assyrian genocide and inclusion of Assyrians in the Treaty of Lausanne. The party has also previously staged protests that aimed to bring more awareness to the genocide, occupying the municipal building in Södertälje in 1998 with the aim of attracting Swedish mass media to write about the Assyrian genocide. The party also carried out a three-day hunger strike later in November of that year to prevent the closure of the Mor Hananyo and Mor Gabriel monasteries.

In 2015, the party took part in an Assyrian-Yezidi coalition meeting with Mikhail Bogdanov in Moscow, and discussed the situation of minorities in Iraq and Syria following the takeover of the Islamic State. The party has previously expressed solidarity with Yezidis, inviting Grand Prince Anwar Muawiya (whom they had developed close connections with) to demonstrate a wholeness in identity.

== Bibliography ==
- Atto, Naures (5 October 2011). Hostages in the homeland, orphans in the diaspora: identity discourses among the Assyrian/Syriac elites in the European diaspora (Doctoral thesis). Leiden University.
- Lee, Sung Ock (2010). A Cultural Comparative Study on the Self-Identification of Maronites in Lebanon and Assyrians in Iraq (PDF) (PhD thesis). Lebanese University.
- Petrosian, Vahram (2006). "Assyrians in Iraq". Iran and the Caucasus. 10 (1): 113–147. doi:10.1163/157338406777979322. ISSN 1609-8498 – via JSTOR.
