= Sargon Dadesho =

Assyrian nationalist and politician from Iraq

- ܣܪܓܘܢ ܕܕܝܫܘܥ
- Born: September 18, 1948 (age 77); Habbaniyah, Iraq
- Occupations: Campaigner, broadcaster, author
- Organization(s): Bet-Nahrain, Inc.
- Political party: Bet-Nahrain Democratic Party
- Movement: Assyrian nationalism

Sargon Dadesho (Syriac: ܣܪܓܘܢ ܕܕܝܫܘܥ, Arabic: سركون داديشو; born September 18, 1948, in Habbaniyah, Iraq) is an Iraqi-American author, broadcaster, activist, and nationalist leader of Assyrian ethnicity. Based in Ceres, California, Dadesho has had an extensive career in Assyrian politics, starting from the 1970s with his height in political activity coming after the US invasion of Iraq.

Dadesho is most well known for being the subject of a failed assassination attempt, which resulted in a lawsuit that he won against the Iraqi government. He was also awarded $2.4 million from confiscated Iraqi government assets in 2003.

== Biography ==
Dadesho was born on September 18, 1948, in the city of Habbaniyah in the Al Anbar Governorate of Iraq. He had just graduated high school by the time his parents left the country for California in 1965, where he has lived ever since. The roots of his activism stem back to his college years, when he began to read more seriously about Assyrian history after wanting to understand why his family left Iraq. He had received degrees from Modesto Junior College, Stanislaus State University, and Chico State University.

Dadesho's political career is said to have begun around the 1970s, when he was involved with the Assyrian Universal Alliance. However, Dadesho desired to find a different and more militant solution to ending persecution against Assyrians in Iraq, and so he left the AUA to found the Bet-Nahrain Democratic Party in California in 1974. The party was founded as a union between Dadesho's 501(c)(03) non-profit organization Bet-Nahrain, Inc. and the Quest Movement in Chicago, headed by other advocates such as Gilyana Yonan. By this time, he had also founded the Assyrian National Congress to bring together organizations that had previously been ignored or alienated by the AUA, incorporating the BNDP and the Assyrian American Leadership Council.

== Career ==
Dadesho held a stance of Assyrian nationalism as head of the BNDP, creating the Assyrian National Manifesto which called for an Assyrian autonomous state in Mosul or Duhok. Additionally, according to the AUA, the BNDP under Dadesho was one of the very first organizations to adopt the modern Assyrian flag, alongside them and another organization called the Assyrian National Federation.

Dadesho was also a prominent advocate of the "Assyrian only" camp, a position he had uncompromisingly held after the explosion of the Chaldean identity in Assyrian politics during the 2000 US Census. Dadesho had claimed that the separation of Chaldeans from Assyrians was indicative of Saddam Hussein and his policies to hurt the Assyrian name, and he eventually filed a lawsuit alongside the ANC to try and prevent the separation of the groups into two. He had also been critical of the term "Chaldo-Assyrian", sending a letter to the office of George W. Bush that rejected the Transitional Administrative Law.

=== Bet-Nahrain, Inc. ===
Through his organization Bet-Nahrain, Inc., Dadesho was able to found a TV station, KBSV, in 1996 that broadcast to Ceres and Modesto. The channel was partially branded under the name AssyriaSat and gained attention after Dadesho's lawsuit against the Iraqi government. The organization also founded a radio station, KBES, in the late 1970s. Reports described the Bet-Nahrain organization as resembling a mini empire, embracing Assyrian iconography and culture.

In 2006, Bet-Nahrain, Inc. hosted a dinner reception, with figures of the ACOE such as Gewargis III and Odisho Oraham present at the dinner. Dadesho made a $5,000 donation for the purposes of building Assyrian schools in Iraq, after learning the situation of the community in the country post-invasion.

=== Assassination lawsuit ===
In the early 1990s, Dadesho was the planned target of a failed assassination attempt against him. The hitman, an Assyrian named Andri Khoshaba, was enlisted by the Ba'athist government of Iraq, whom he had loyalties toward after establishing close ties with Iraq's U.N. Mission. Khoshaba hoped to receive help from a friend, Rodes Youkhana, and both agreed to split $50,000 after the killing. However, Youkhana had turned over evidence of the assassination to the FBI and Khoshaba was arrested soon after. The United States expelled Hamed Ahmed al-Amery, an Iraqi U.N. official, after the foiled attempt.

Although Khoshaba was initially released due to a lack of physical evidence, he would soon after be indicted for attempting to assassinate Dadesho, as well as Jalal Talabani who had planned to visit the area. Dadesho and the ANC had gotten into contact with the United States government under the administration of George H. W. Bush soon afterwards, urging an end to the regime of Saddam Hussein.

In 1995, Dadesho won a $1.5 million settlement against the Iraqi government for emotional distress suffered after the failed assassination attempt. The Iraqi government appealed the decision, but a federal appeals court later affirmed the judgment and the appeal was denied. In April 2003, he was awarded an additional $2.4 million that came from the confiscated assets of the Iraqi government, and was one of a number of victims to finally collect judgments from lawsuits filed after the first Gulf War.

=== Zinda Magazine Assyrian of the Year ===
Wilfred Bet-Alkhas, editor and publisher of the online newsletter Zinda Magazine, selected Dadesho as the "Assyrian Person of the Year" for 2005, saying that Dadesho was "celebrated as both an Assyrian nationalist and a nemesis of Assyrian political progress".

== Controversy ==
Dadesho was a seemingly controversial figure in the Assyrian community, known for criticizing bishops of the Assyrian Church of the East as well as his personal criticisms of the Assyrian Democratic Movement under the leadership of Yonadam Kanna. These criticisms were extended to political negotiations for Assyrian politics in Iraq, when Dadesho had taken part in a conference in London and openly criticized the ADM, as well as negotiations involving the representation of Assyrians in the Iraqi constitution after 2003. Even Zinda Magazine, who awarded Dadesho "Assyrian of the Year" for 2005, noted how he had filed two lawsuits against the magazine previously for portrayal of his personal actions as well as claims of supporting Kurdish officials.

Zinda also alleged that Dadesho had provided media services to other political groups in exchange for funding, noting two separate programs that espoused Anti-Iranian sentiment where the hosts spoke Azerbaijani and Arabic.

Preceded by Yonadam Kanna	Zinda Magazine Assyrian of the Year; 2005 (6754)	Succeeded by Nuri Kino
