= Nuri Kino =

Swedish-Assyrian journalist and filmmaker

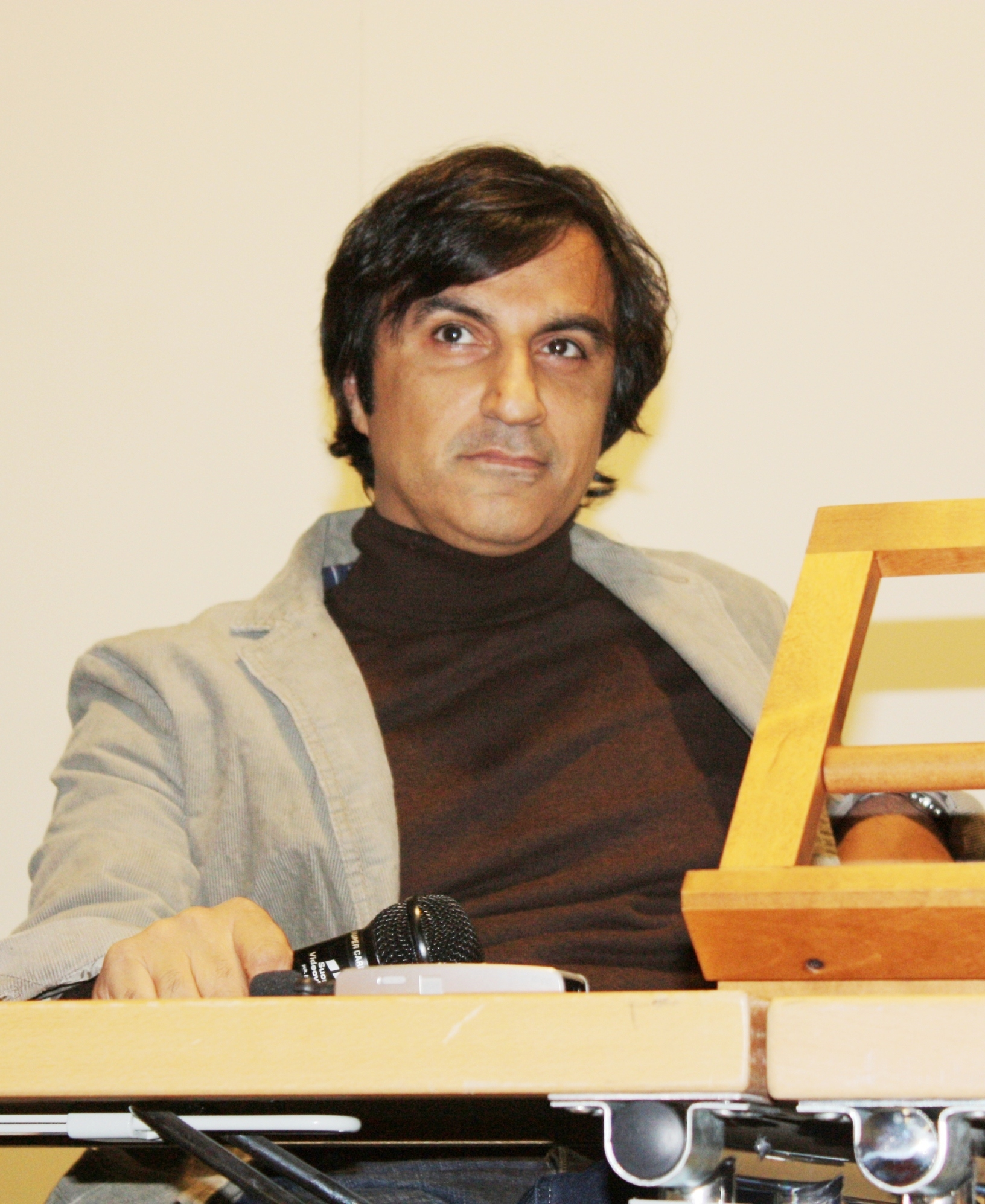
- Nuri Kino at Helsinki Book Fair 2009
- Born: Nuri Kino; 25 February 1965 (age 61); Tur Abdin, Turkey
- Occupations: Journalist, author and filmmaker
- Years active: 1999-present

Nuri Kino, (born February 25, 1965, in Tur Abdin), is a Swedish-Assyrian investigative journalist, documentary filmmaker, author and human rights advocate. He is the author of nonfiction books and journalistic reports from the Middle East, western and eastern Europe, as well as Africa, over the past two decades. He has won awards for his reporting on human-rights issues, and is the founder of human rights organization A Demand For Action (ADFA), which advocates for persecuted minorities in Iraq, Syria, Turkey and elsewhere in the Middle East.

== Life and career ==
Nuri Kino is the eldest of four children of an Assyrian family that originates from the village of Kfar-Shomaʿ, south of the City of Midyat, in a region known as Tur Abdin. His parents moved to Germany as guest workers when he was four; in 1974, when he was eight, they visited his grandparents in Sweden and decided to stay because there were more jobs. He was kidnapped twice as a child. In 1985 he became one of Sweden's first male medical recorders. He has also run a restaurant; in 1994 he was chosen as Stockholm's most popular restaurant owner.

In 1998, he graduated from the Poppius School of Journalism in Stockholm. The following year he was in Istanbul when the Marmara earthquake occurred. He was interviewed by international news agencies and wrote a widely cited report on the collapse of buildings that had been known to be weak; this was the real start of his career as a journalist. He has since worked as a freelance investigative journalist for Dagens Nyheter, Expressen, Aftonbladet and Metro. In 2002 he started freelancing for the Swedish radio station Sveriges Radio. His reporting has been focused on human rights, immigration and refugee issues, and he has worked for the media abroad in countries such as Turkey, Denmark, Norway, Finland, the U.S., and the Netherlands (reporting for the BBC and on the Dutch program Dit is de Dag).

Nuri Kino was the first journalist to interview Irena Sendler, a Polish nurse who risked her life to smuggle 2,500 Jewish children out of the ghettos of Warsaw during World War II. The article was published in the Swedish daily newspaper Dagens Nyheter on February 8, 2003. Shortly after that it was translated into several other languages and among others published in Wprost, the largest weekly magazine in Poland. The following year, two Nobel Prize laureates, Wislawa Szymborska and Czeslaw Milosz, nominated Sendler for the Nobel Peace Prize. She was nominated a number of times until her death in May 2008 but never received the prize. However, she received several national and international distinctions for her heroic deeds during the Second World War.

After a two-year hiatus from journalism, Kino went to Lebanon to write a report on the Christian minority in Syria, Mellan taggtråden (Between the Barbed Wire), published in 2013; it was widely cited in the media internationally and gave rise to many debates, among them the U.S. Congress Joint Subcommittee Hearing on Religious Minorities in Syria: Caught in the Middle.

He was selected to host the Sommar radio program on P1 on June 18, 2004.

Nuri Kino also does aid work, sometimes with the Youth Initiative of the Syriac Orthodox Church. In 2014 he founded A Demand For Action, an organization that provides relief and advocates for minorities in the Middle East, particularly Christians in Iraq and Syria. From this position, in his home town of Södertälje, Sweden, he has developed a global network of human rights experts and activists who serve as a deep resource on persecuted minorities in the Middle East, frequently sought out by national politicians, multinational organizations, the European Parliament and the United States Congress. In an interview, European Parliamentarian Lars Adaktusson said of Kino, "If Nuri would not have started ADFA we would not be able to have the ongoing genocide of Christians in Iraq and Syria recognized as a Genocide in the European Parliament. We would probably not even be aware of it. Thanks to ADFA's tireless work we have been able to even have the U.S. congress to recognize the atrocities as genocide."

Along with Swedish entrepreneur Gunilla Von Platen, Kino is leading the Swedish part of the Little Angel project; an orphanage that is being built outside Damascus in Syria where children from Iraq and Syria who have lost their families will be able to live, eat, and go to school.

=== Television and film ===
With Yawsef Beth Turo, Kino made Det ohörda ropet ("The Cry Unheard," 2001), about the killing of Assyrians in Turkey during World War I.

With Erik Sandberg, Kino made Assyriska - landslag utan land ("Assyriska - national team without a nation") for Sveriges Television. In 2006 it won the Golden Palm Award at the Beverly Hills Film Festival. With Jenny Nordberg he made the documentary The High Price of Ransom for Dan Rather Reports in 2008.

=== Books ===
In 2007, Kino published By God - Sex dagar i Amman (By God – Six Days in Amman), a report on the consequences of the Iraqi war. In 2010 he wrote Still Targeted: Continued Persecution of Iraq's Minorities, a report for Minority Rights Group International.

In 2011, he published Den svenske Gudfadern (The Swedish Godfather), about Milan Ševo, a convicted felon born in Serbia but brought up in Sweden, who claimed that close friends of King Carl XVI Gustaf had given him the task of destroying evidence that linked them and the king to porn clubs. The book was presented as a work of journalism illuminating the attraction that crime has for young people. Journalist Hanne Kjöller of Dagens Nyheter considered the book lacking in both objectivity and criticism of the sources, calling it a "portrait of an idol". However, the Swedish tabloid Aftonbladet reported that Ševo confirmed the information in the book was correct. Writing in Göteborgs-Posten, Mattias Hagberg thought the controversy detracted from Kino's message. According to the book's publisher, Kino's computer was hacked and threats were made to stop a planned TV film.

Kino has also published novels. In 2008 with Jenny Nordberg he published Välgörarna - Den motvillige journalisten (Benefactors - The Reluctant Journalist), a suspense novel whose main character he has said is based on himself; it has been translated into Finnish, German, and Norwegian.

In 2010, he and David Kushner published Gränsen är dragen, a novel set against the backdrop of the war in Iraq and the situation of Iraqi Christians; it was published in the U.S. in 2013 as The Line in the Sand.

== Awards ==
=== 2000 ===
- Awarded Guldspaden with Wolfgang Hansson for work at Aftonbladet on human trafficking.

=== 2002 ===
- Awarded Guldspaden for journalism for work on refugee children.

=== 2003 ===
- Awarded Guldspaden for a joint effort with Jenny Nordberg and Margita Boström for a Swedish Radio report titled Tolkar och spioner (interpreters and spies).

=== 2004 ===
- Ikaros Prize for Best Public Service Radio program by Swedish Radio
- Awarded Den gyllene haldan ("The Golden Halda") (also known as Det lite större journalistpriset), for journalist students at Mitt University in Sundsvall, Sweden

=== 2006 ===
- Suryoyo (Assyrian) of the Year by Hujådå.
- Journalist of the Year by Qenneshrin and Suroyo TV, a Syriac newspaper and satellite television service.
- Blatte de Luxe Award for Journalism
- Assyrian of the Year by Zinda Magazine
- Assyrian of the Year by the Assyrian Youth Federation of Sweden
- Golden Palm Award of the Beverly Hills Film Festival, for Assyriska.

=== 2007 ===
- Blatte de Luxe Award for Journalism: first person to win the award two years in a row.

=== 2008 ===
- Ikaros Prize for Best Public Service Radio program by Swedish Radio

=== 2009 ===
- One of a hundred Swedish inspiring people, awarded by Leva Magazine

=== 2010 ===
- Journalist Prize of the European Parliament for radio, with Kajsa Norell.

Preceded by Sargon Dadesho	Zinda Magazine Assyrian of the Year; 2006 (6755)	Succeeded by Sarkis Aghajan Mamendo
