= Alipınar, Bağlar =

Alipınar
- Neighbourhood
- Location in Turkey
- Coordinates: 37.90647°N 40.20969°E
- Country: Turkey
- Province: Diyarbakır
- District: Bağlar
- Time zone: UTC+3 (TRT)

Alipınar (Syriac: ʿAïn Tannūr) (Note: Alternatively transliterated as ʿAyn Tannūr. Also known as Alibar, Ali Pasha, Ali Pınar, Ali Punar, Alipunar, Ali-Punar, Ali-Pounar, Alipounor, or All-Poir.) is a neighbourhood of the municipality and district of Bağlar, Diyarbakır Province, Turkey.

== History ==
ʿAïn Tannūr (today called Alipınar) was historically inhabited by Armenians, Syriac Orthodox Christians, and Chaldean Catholics. The village is first attested in 1555, in which year a manuscript was sold to Abraham of ʿAïn Tannūr at Maʿarrīn for the use of his nephew the deacon Gīwārgīs, son of the deacon Darwīsh. ʿAïn Tannūr is named as the seat of a bishop in Patriarch Abdisho IV Maron's letter of 1562. Manuscripts were commissioned for the Church of Mār Quriāqōs at ʿAïn Tannūr in 1568 and 1573. Three men from the village accompanied the metropolitan Ḥnānīshōʿ of Mardin on his pilgrimage to Jerusalem in 1582. A manuscript was donated to the Church of Mār Quriāqōs by Gīwārgīs, son of Shāhīn, in 1661.

Patriarch Eliya IX withdrew to ʿAïn Tannūr for several weeks in 1672 after the authorities at Diyarbakır recognised the metropolitan Joseph as an independent Catholic archbishop. At this point in time, the village was largely inhabited by traditionalist Church of the East Christians, but Chaldean Catholics were in the majority several decades later. ʿAbd al-Aḥad of ʿAïn Tannūr, son of Garabet, was consecrated as metropolitan of Amid by Patriarch Joseph III at ʿAïn Tannūr on 5 November 1717 and he served in that role until his death in 1728. The Catholic community at ʿAïn Tannūr was recognised at Constantinople in 1731. It was known as Ali Punar by the 19th century.

In 1815, most of the village's Chaldean Catholic population was killed in a Kurdish raid whilst the survivors took refuge at Diyarbakır. There were 15 Armenian hearths in 1880. There was an Armenian church of Surb Astvatsamayr. Many of the Armenians in the village were killed and the Church of Mār Quriāqōs and an Armenian church were pillaged in November 1895 during the massacres in the Diyarbekir vilayet. It was located in the Diyarbakır central district (merkez kaza) in the Diyarbakır sanjak in the Diyarbekir vilayet in c. 1900. It was populated by 80 Chaldean Catholics and served by one church as part of the Chaldean Catholic diocese of Amid in 1913. In 1914, it was inhabited by 100 Syriacs, according to the list presented to the Paris Peace Conference by the Assyro-Chaldean delegation.

== Bibliography ==
- Abed Mshiho Neman of Qarabash (2021) [1918]. Sayfo – An Account of the Assyrian Genocide. Translated by Michael Abdalla; Łukasz Kiczko. Edinburgh University Press.
- Gaunt, David (2006). Massacres, Resistance, Protectors: Muslim-Christian Relations in Eastern Anatolia during World War I. Gorgias Press.
- Jongerden, Joost; Verheij, Jelle, eds. (2012). Social Relations in Ottoman Diyarbekir, 1870-1915. Brill.
- Kévorkian, Raymond H. (2006). "Demographic Changes in the Armenian Population of Diarbekir, 1895-1914". In Richard G. Hovannisian (ed.). Armenian Tigranakert/Diarbekir and Edessa/Urfa. Mazda Publishers.
- Takahashi, Hidemi (2011). "Amid". In Sebastian P. Brock; Aaron M. Butts; George A. Kiraz; Lucas Van Rompay (eds.). Gorgias Encyclopedic Dictionary of the Syriac Heritage. Gorgias Press. pp. 18–20.
- Wilmshurst, David (2000). The Ecclesiastical Organisation of the Church of the East, 1318–1913 (PDF). Peeters Publishers.
