= GFA =

GFA may refer to:

== Politics ==
- Assyria Liberation Party, an Assyrian nationalist organization
- Good Friday Agreement of 1998 concerning Northern Ireland

== Sport ==
=== Association football ===
- GFA F.C., a Burmese football club
- G.F.A. Cup, a football competition in Gozo, Malta
- Girls Football Academy, a Lebanese former women's football club
- Gambia Football Association
- Ghana Football Association
- Gibraltar Football Association
- Gloucestershire County Football Association, in England
- Goa Football Association, in India
- Gozo Football Association, in Malta
- Greenland Football Association
- Grenada Football Association
- Guam Football Association
- Guernsey Football Association

=== Other sports ===
- Gascoyne Football Association
- Gliding Federation of Australia

== Organizations ==
- Assyria Liberation Party, an Assyrian nationalist organization
- Georgia Film Academy, not-for-profit film/television program based in Atlanta, Georgia
- Glasgow Filmmakers Alliance, a Scottish trade directory
- Gliding Federation of Australia, the governing body of gliding in Australia
- Gospel for Asia, a Christian missionary organization
- Greens Farms Academy, in Connecticut, United States,
- Guitar Foundation of America, an American music organization
- Gulf Air, a Bahraini airline (ICAO designator GFA)

== Other uses ==
- Fredericton International Airport, formerly Greater Fredericton Airport
- George French Angas, English/Australian naturalist and artist
- GFA BASIC, a programming language
- "Goodbye, Farewell and Amen", the finale of the television series M*A*S*H
- Gross floor area, in building construction
- Guldfågeln Arena, the home arena of Swedish football team Kalmar FF
