= Assyrians in the Netherlands =

Ethnic group in the Netherlands

Assyrians in the Netherlands Assyriërs in Nederland
Total population
- 30.000

Regions with significant populations
- Twente, Amsterdam and surroundings

Languages
- Aramaic (Surayt and Suret); Dutch

Religion
- Syriac Orthodox, Assyrian Church of the East, Chaldean Catholic

Assyrians in the Netherlands (Dutch: Assyriërs in Nederland) are Dutch citizens of Assyrian descent. They mainly live in the east of the country, in the province of Overijssel, in such cities as Enschede, Hengelo, Rijssen, Almelo and Borne. The main reason that the Assyrians are concentrated there is because it is an industrial area which lies at the Germany–Netherlands border, where a large German Assyrian population resides. Many Assyrians in the Netherlands have relatives in Germany.

== History ==
The first Assyrians came to the Netherlands in the 1970s as a result of fights between the PKK and the Turkish army. Most of them were from the province of Mardin in southeastern Turkey, where the aforementioned conflict took place. In the 1980s, Assyrians from Syria, with almost all of them being from the originally Assyrian city of Qamishli (Syriac: ܒܬ ܙܠܝܢ Bet Zalin), began to emigrate to the Netherlands. The latest group of Assyrians to migrate to the Netherlands are from Iraq, and they have been arriving there since the first Gulf War. The large majority of Turkish and Syrian Assyrians in the Netherlands belong to the Syriac Orthodox Church since they are from the western part of the Assyrian homeland, where the Syriac Orthodox Church is the most prominent.

In the 1980s, as with other immigrants in Europe, a strong feeling of nationalism started to develop among the Assyrians in the Netherlands. This sentiment started to make Assyrians be active in working for projects that helped them preserve their identity. A few projects that started out were Assyrian society building, Assyrians churches and Assyrians language classes, which were being given in Dutch schools to Assyrian children and also on weekends in so-called Bible school classes. They also started camps for Assyrians youth and Assyrian music and dance classes were offered in the community. For adult Assyrians, lectures on society building and many social events were organized. Since 1981 there has been a Syriac Orthodox monastery in the village Glane near the German border.

The Assyrians began to organize demonstrations to bring their situation in the Assyrian homeland to the attention of the media and to bring the 20th century Assyrian genocide to the attention of the Dutch government.

== Current situation ==
The Assyrians have managed to both integrate into Dutch society and maintain their own ethnic identity, as there are a lot of social events organized by Assyrian clubs. Some of the latest projects which Assyrians in the Netherlands have started are: the Seyfo Center, the Assyrian Church Choir, representation of Assyrians in the Dutch government (such as Attiya Gamri), and the foundation of the Assyrian Youth Movement (AJF).

Assyrians in the Netherlands mostly belong to Syriac Orthodox Church, but there is also a small community belonging to the Assyrian Church of the East, Chaldean Catholic Church and Syriac Catholic Church. The first Assyrians mainly worked in factories or opened restaurants, but today, mostly attend university and work in all sectors of the economy.

== Notable people ==
- Attiya Gamri
- George Aslan
- Ninos Gouriye
- Jasar Takak

== See also ==
- Turks in the Netherlands
- Iranians in the Netherlands
- Syrians in the Netherlands
- Iraqis in the Netherlands
- Kurds in the Netherlands
