= Rozune =

Religious culinary tradition in Assyrian culture

Rozune ܪܙܘܢܐ
- Official name: ܪܙܘܢܐ
- Observed by: Syriac Orthodox Church, Assyrian people
- Type: Christian, Cultural
- Date: 9 March
- Frequency: Annual

Rozune (Syriac: ܪܙܘܢܐ), or Rozuno, is an annual religious tradition in the Syriac Orthodox Church that takes place every year on March 9th. The tradition commemorates the Forty Martyrs of Sebaste in a unique commemoration involving the baking of bread and hiding a coin to be found. The tradition continues to be commemorated across Assyrian communities of the SOC.

== Origin ==
The tradition of Rozune commemorates the Forty Martyrs of Sebaste, a group of Roman soldiers who were killed in 320 AD near the city of Sebaste (modern day Sivas, Turkey) for their Christian faith. These soldiers, who refused to renounce their faith, were tortured and imprisoned, and sentenced by the Roman governor to perish in a freezing lake naked. Although one of the 40 soldiers succumbed to a nearby bathouse, a pagan soldier decided to take their place by converting to Christianity on the spot. Eventually, the soldiers were burnt and their ashes recovered by Empress Pulcheria.

In memory of their suffering and sacrifice, Rozune developed as a tradition in the Syriac Orthodox Church, with the hidden coin symbolizing the pagan soldier who converted.

== Culture and celebrations ==
Some sources indicate that Rozune is rooted in ancient Mesopotamian traditions. Rozune is commemorated by Assyrians annually during the middle of the Great Lent fast, which itself lasts 40 days. The tradition describes a piece of bread made of wheat dough or leavening agent in the shape of a star, with a coin hidden in one of the pieces. The bread is then served, and the person who finds the coin is considered lucky for the year.

The bread is also served to animals and left in fields/vineyards to bring abundance. Rozune is similar to other culinary traditions where coins are hidden in bread, such as King cake, Bulgarian Banitsa (Bulgarian: баница), the Greek Vasilopita (Greek: Βασιλόπιτα), and Irish Barmbrack (Irish: bairín breac).

== See also ==
- Hano Qritho
- Assyrian cuisine
- Assyrian culture

== Bibliography ==
- Abdalla, Michael (1991). Walker, Harlan (ed.). The Way the Contemporary Western Assyrians take Food in the Middle East during Fasts and Church Holidays. Oxford Symposium on Food and Cookery. pp. 15–26. ISBN 9780907325468.
- Akkuş, Baran (January 2025). ŞEHİR VE KÜLTÜR: Diyarbakır’ın Binbir Rengi. Istanbul: Çinar Mat. ISBN 978-625-6132-02-3.
