= Hano Qritho =

Syriac Orthodox Church celebration

Hano Qritho ܚܢܐ ܩܪܝܬܐ
- Official name: ܚܢܐ ܩܪܝܬܐ
- Observed by: Syriac Orthodox Church, Assyrian diaspora
- Type: Christian, secular
- Date: Sunday before Lent
- Frequency: Annual
- Related to: Great Lent

Hano Qritho (Syriac: ܚܢܐ ܩܪܝܬܐ) is an annual celebration in the Syriac Orthodox Church that takes place the Sunday before Great Lent. The tradition is rooted in Mesopotamia and is based on a Biblical story; today, Hano Qritho continues to be celebrated by Assyrians in Turkey, Syria, and the diaspora.

== Origin ==
The celebration of Hano Qritho is parallel to the Biblical story of Jephthah in Judges 11 (29-40), rooted in an ancient legend in Tur Abdin. In the tale, a local king vows to sacrifice the first person who comes to meet him after his victory in battle, but that person is his daughter Hano, who comes to congratulate him. Although the king was worried and his comrades tried to dissuade him, the king stated it was impossible to back down on his promise, and so his daughter requested 40 days to celebrate with her companions in the mountains. After the 40 days, the two reunited, and the king sacrificed his daughter. Before her death, Hano requested that her friends commemorate her through song and celebrations.

== Culture and celebrations ==
Celebrations of Hano Qritho take place annually the Sunday before the start of Lent. Most recently, celebrations have been observed in northeastern Syria, Tur Abdin, and diaspora communities such as Sweden.

It's not uncommon for celebrants to perform dances and sing folk songs, though the holiday has its own unique traditions. For cuisine, Assyrians will prepare bulgur before the Lent fast in a big feast with traditional cuisine. Dishes such as Kavurma are prepared for the feast. Additionally, the name "Hano Qritho" applies to a female figurine representing fertility. A tradition of the festival is to prepare a doll based on this figure, prepared by the women of the town/village, after which children will carry it to the houses of residents. The house owners will sprinkle water on the children, symbolizing abundance. The children collect and take bulgur, meat and eggs to the local church and prepared in the feast. A traditional game of hiding the Kavurma is also played for the youth to find, before the Hano Qritho doll is smashed and leftover food is given to those in need. The effigy is buried near the church or a cemetery to complete the celebration.

In literature and music, Assyrian musician Ninib Lahdo composed a song in commemoration of the celebration, aptly titled "Hano Kritho" and written by producer George Shamoun. The song has since become one of the most well known cultural items of the celebration amongst Assyrians, including performances at Assyrian cultural centers. The poet Touma Nahroyo also composed a poem in commemoration of the holiday.

Assyrians who are members of the Assyrian Church of the East and the Chaldean Catholic Church have a celebration similar to Hano Qritho, known as Kalu Sulaqa (Syriac: ܟܵܠܘܿ ܕܣܘܼܠܵܩܵܐ), or "Bride of the Ascension". Hano Qritho was also formerly practiced by the Mhallami, an Arabic-speaking tribal ethnic group theorized to have Assyrian origins, known as "Kırd".

== Bibliography ==
- Abdalla, Michael (1991). Walker, Harlan (ed.). The Way the Contemporary Western Assyrians take Food in the Middle East during Fasts and Church Holidays. Oxford Symposium on Food and Cookery. pp. 15–26. ISBN 9780907325468.
- Begiç, H. Nurgül (21 March 2025). Traditional Turkish Handmade Dolls. Akademi Kültür. ISBN 9786259583228.
- Ozer, Cagla (19 December 2019). "A monographic research on the Assyrian culinary culture in Turkey". Journal of Ethnic Foods. 6 (26) 26. doi:10.1186/s42779-019-0036-0.

== See also ==
- Rozune
- Assyrian culture
