= KBSV =

Television station in Ceres, California

- Ceres–Modesto, California; United States
- City: Ceres, California
- Channels: Digital: 15 (UHF); Virtual: 23
- Branding: AssyriaVision, AssyriaSat

Programming
- Language: Assyrian
- Affiliations: 23.1: Independent

Ownership
- Owner: Bet-Nahrain, Inc.
- Sister stations: KBES

History
- First air date: April 14, 1996
- Former call signs: KBAV (June–August 1995)
- Former channel numbers: Analog: 23 (UHF, 1996–2009)

Technical information
- Licensing authority: FCC
- Facility ID: 4939
- ERP: 0.421 kW; 0.5 kW (STA)
- HAAT: 575.6 m (1,888 ft); 41 m (135 ft) (STA)
- Transmitter coordinates: 37°30′27.7″N 121°22′23.9″W; 37°35′20.7″N 120°57′26.8″W (STA)

Links
- Public license information: Public file; LMS
- Website: www.betnahrain.org

KBSV (channel 23) is a non-commercial independent television station in Ceres, California, United States, broadcasting Assyrian programming to the Ceres and Modesto area since 1996. It is owned by Bet-Nahrain, Inc. alongside radio station KBES (89.5 FM). The two stations share studios and a transmitter site at the Bet-Nahrain Assyrian Cultural Center on South Central Avenue in Ceres. Though holding a full-service station license, KBSV broadcasts at low power to a limited area.

== History ==
KBSV began broadcasting April 14, 1996. It was founded by Bet-Nahrain Inc., the organization of Sargon Dadesho, an Assyrian-American activist originally from Iraq; prior to the advent of channel 23, Bet-Nahrain offered an hour a day of Assyrian programming on local public-access television. The station also began webcasting 24 hours a day in 1997.

AssyriaSat was primarily used to transmit news and other information to the Assyrian community in both the homeland and diaspora, and it as well as Dadesho gained media traction after the 2003 invasion of Iraq. The program went live in Modesto–Turlock in 2002, and was the first Assyrian satellite program to go on air. Broadcasts from the program could be watched live on the Internet. In 2003, KBSV was believed to be the only non-governmental broadcast originating in the U.S. and receivable in Iraq.

KBSV was previously broadcast from Mount Oso in Stanislaus County, but it was forced to move after the property owner terminated their lease for the site and has since operated on a temporary facility basis from the KBES tower, the intended permanent location.

== Subchannel ==
Subchannel of KBSV
Subchannel	Res.	Short name	Programming
23.1	480i	KBSV-TV	Main KBSV programming (4:3)

== See also ==
- ANB SAT
- Suroyo TV
- Suryoyo Sat
- Ishtar TV

== Bibliography ==
- BarAbraham, Abdulmesih (May 7, 2024). "From Printed Magazines to TVs: The Evolution of Assyrian Media in European Diaspora". In Çelebi, Nurgül; Tunç, İsmet (eds.). Turabdin - Tarih Din Kültür. DTA Yayıncılık. p. 229. ISBN 9786259442570.
