= KBES =

Radio station in Ceres, California

- Ceres, California; United States
- Broadcast area: Central Valley
- Frequency: 89.5 MHz

Programming
- Format: World Ethnic

Ownership
- Owner: Bet Nahrain, Inc.

History
- First air date: 1979
- Call sign meaning: Bet-Nahrain/Evan Simon, a major donor

Technical information
- Licensing authority: FCC
- Facility ID: 4938
- Class: A
- ERP: 150 watts
- HAAT: 40 meters (130 ft)
- Transmitter coordinates: 37°35′21″N 120°57′23″W

Links
- Public license information: Public file; LMS
- Website: betnahrain.org

KBES (89.5 FM) is a non-commercial Assyrian radio station broadcasting a world ethnic format. Licensed to Ceres, California, United States, the station serves the Central Valley area. The station is owned by Bet Nahrain, Inc., alongside KBSV.

== History ==
KBES was first founded in 1979 and had its first broadcast on September 2 of that year. The station was founded by Sargon Dadesho the owner of Bet-Nahrain, Inc., who stated that the channel was unique in providing non-commercial, educational programming to the Assyrian community in Ceres. Dadesho also stated that KBES would be the first Assyrian radio station in the whole world.

The station had a construction permit dated back to 1977 and received a license to cover the area of Ceres later in January 1978. The station would cover primarily Assyrian related topics and culture.
