= Ishtar TV =

- Type: Satellite television network
- Country: Iraq
- Availability: Middle East, diaspora communities
- Key people: Sarkis Aghajan Mamendo
- Launch date: 2005
- Official website: www.ishtartv.com

Ishtar TV (Syriac: ܐܬܝܪܝܬܐ ܕܥܫܬܪ) is an Assyrian broadcasting channel which has its headquarters in Ankawa, Iraq. It was established by Sarkis Aghajan and was led by George Mansour, who was Ishtar TV's first General Manager, in 2005. The network broadcasts mostly in Syriac, but Arabic and Kurdish are heard throughout the day as well.

The channel is named after the ancient Assyrian goddess Ishtar, who remains a part of modern Assyrian culture. Politically, the channel is affiliated with the Chaldean Syriac Assyrian Popular Council.

== See also ==
- ANB SAT
- Suroyo TV
- Suryoyo Sat
- Ashur TV
- KBSV
- Assyria TV
