= George Aslan =

Turkish Assyrian politician

George Aslan MP
- ܓܐܘܪܓܝ ܐܪܝܐ

Member of the Grand National Assembly
- Incumbent
- Assumed office 2 June 2023
- Constituency: Mardin (2023)

Personal details
- Born: George Aryo; 1958 (age 67–68) Arbo, Nusaybin, Mardin, Republic of Turkey
- Party: Peoples' Equality and Democracy Party
- Profession: Politician

George Aslan, also known by his birth name George Aryo (Syriac: ܓܐܘܪܓܝ ܐܪܝܐ), is a Turkish politician of Assyrian descent. He is currently part of the Peoples' Equality and Democracy Party and has been a deputy for Mardin in the Grand National Assembly of Turkey since 2023.

He previously resided in the Netherlands for 37 years.

== Early life ==
Aslan was born in 1958 in the village of Arbo, Nusaybin (known in Turkish as Taşköy), completing primary school there and secondary education in Midyat. After the 1980 Turkish coup d'état, Aslan spent 26 months in the Mamak prison in Ankara and settled in the Netherlands after his release.

While living in the Netherlands, Aslan had been involved in organizations aimed towards the Dutch Assyrian community. He had been an editor of the Shemsho Magazine, as well as a member of various organizations such as the Dutch Tur-Abdin Federation and the Assyrian Mesopotamia Enschede Association (AMVE). Additionally, Aslan had been a member of the Assyrian Federation of Holland and a representative on the Kurdish Parliament in Exile and had voiced public support for Abdullah Öcalan in the wake of his arrest, as well as for Assyrian cooperation with Kurds.

Aslan returned to Turkey in 2015, having followed the political developments of the country for years up to that point. When he went to Mardin, he wasn't able to recognize the same place that he grew up in, noting how completely different everything was.

== Political career ==
Aslan had been selected as a candidate for the Party of the Greens and the Left Future in the 2023 Turkish parliamentary election, winning the spot. He had emphasized Assyrian returns to Turkey as a key part of his election to parliament, as well as standing against discrimination that the community faced and land grabbing, which had been a continuous issue that the community faced up to that point.

Aslan has previously advocated for Assyrians in Turkey in parliamentary sessions. After the murder of 92 year-old Gevriye Akguc in the Enhil village of Tur Abdin, Aslan brought up the issue in parliament, stating that the killing could've been orchestrated to prevent Assyrians from returning to their villages. In 2024, Aslan revealed that 57,000 square meters of land had been stolen from Assyrians and sold at lower prices to people who weren't native to the villages where the land had been grabbed, which he claimed exacerbated the displacement of minorities living in the country. He has also supported other Christian communities in Turkey, opening an investigation after the selling of the Surb Karapet Monastery in Muş and in regards to land grabbing after the Kurdish-Turkish conflict.

Aslan delivered a speech in 2023 after the first Syriac library was opened in Hah, expressing his support and admiration for its opening. In 2025, he extended wishes to the Assyrian community in Turkey on the occasion of Kha b'Nissan (the Assyrian New Year). In the same year, Aslan criticized the inauguration of a monument dedicated to Talaat Pasha in the Altındağ district of Ankara.

=== Harassment in parliament ===
Aslan has been through two instances of harassment in the Turkish parliament, both around Christmas for delivering holiday messages to the Assyrians of the country. In 2023, Aslan faced intervention from members of the Turkish nationalist Good Party after delivering a Christmas message in Turoyo, with permission from Deputy Speaker of the Grand National Assembly Sırrı Süreyya Önder. He responded to the Good Party by stating,

"I want to repeat what I said in the Parliament: We did not bring this language from another planet. Syriac is a language of this land. We are the indigenous people of this land for 12,000 years. We were here when no one else was on these lands. Why they react so strongly is incomprehensible. However, we know that this is a denial of real history."

Aslan once again faced a similar issue in 2024, when while delivering another Christmas message in Turoyo, speaker Bekir Bozdağ turned off his microphone, to which Aslan replied with, "Some deputies are reading Arabic verses from the Quran on the podium. Please turn it off when the verses are read. If it doesn't turn off, I, who never tease anyone, will tease you very much, believe me. If there is holiness, all holiness is given importance."

== Personal life ==
Aslan can speak five languages, namely Syriac, Kurdish, Turkish, and Dutch, with some degree of Arabic.
