= Taşköy, Nusaybin =

Village in Mardin Province, Turkey

Taşköy
- Neighbourhood
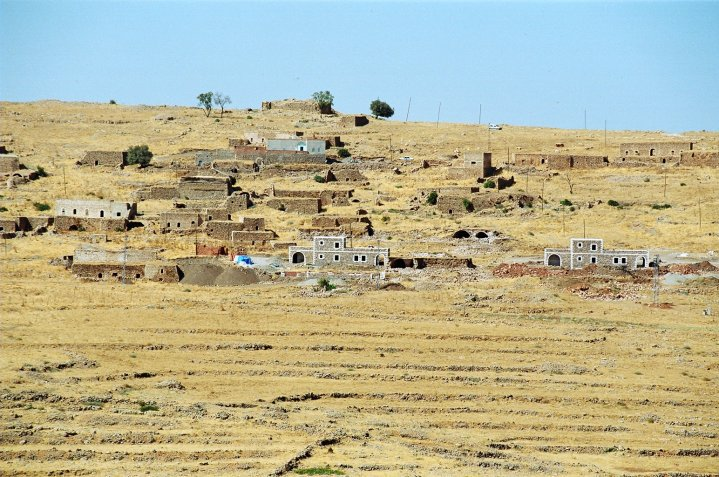

- Location within Turkey
- Coordinates: 37°16′24″N 41°29′3″E
- Country: Turkey
- Province: Mardin
- District: Nusaybin
- Population (2021): 33
- Time zone: UTC+3 (TRT)

Taşköy (Note: "Stone-village" in Turkish.) (Arabic: اربو; Kurdish: Erbo; Syriac: ܐܪܒܘ, romanized: Arbo) (Note: Alternatively transliterated as Arbō, Arbô, Ârbo, or Arbū. Nisba: Arbōyo.) is a neighbourhood in the municipality and district of Nusaybin, Mardin Province in Turkey. The village is populated by Syriacs and had a population of 33 in 2021. It is located atop Mount Izla in the historic region of Tur Abdin.

In the village, there are churches of Mor Dimet, (Note: Also spelt as Mōr Ḍīmat or Morī Dīmiṭ.) the Mother of God, (Note: Also known as the Church of the Virgin Mary.) Mor Shimun, Mor Giwergis, and Mor Shalito.

== History ==
Arbo (today called Taşköy) was an important settlement in Late antiquity. The monk-priest Shim’un (Simon) son of Sholem of Arbo at the Mar Malke Monastery (fl. 1214) and the deacon Mas’ud Turkoman of Arbo (fl. 1314) were renowned calligraphers. According to the account of the priest Addai of Basibrina in c. 1500 appended to the Chronography of Bar Hebraeus, Arbo survived Timur's invasion in 1401 (AG 1712) by the intercession of Dioscorus Behnam Shatti, metropolitan bishop of Beth Risha, after he had appealed directly to Timur's son Mīrānshāh to spare his village and had received a kerchief as a sign of his decision. However, Arbo, including the Monastery of Mar Shim’un (Simon), was destroyed alongside Nisibis and the villages of Hbab and Ma’are by Malik al-Adel, the governor of Hasankeyf, in 1403 (AG 1714).

Iyawannis Barsoum of the Zuqaqi family of Arbo was metropolitan bishop of Jazira (fl. 1415–1457). Yuhanna Addai of Arbo (d. 1432) was metropolitan bishop of Mor Gabriel Monastery. Dionysius Malke I of the Zuqaqi family of Arbo was metropolitan bishop of Ma’dan in 1450 and died in 1465. Philoxenus Ibrahim of Manim’am, metropolitan bishop of the diocese of Arbo, Nisibis, M’arē, and Kartwoytō, also known as the diocese of Beth Risha, is attested in 1454 (AG 1765). He had been ordained by Ignatius Qoma, patriarch of Tur Abdin, and was transferred to the diocese of Amid in 1455. The priest Yusuf of Arbo and Rabban Barsoum of Arbo are recorded amongst the monks residing at the Mar Malke Monastery in 1476. Ignatius Saba II of Arbo was patriarch of Tur Abdin in 1482–1489.

Iyawannis II, metropolitan bishop of Beth Risha, was killed at Arbo by the emir of Cizre in 1505 according to a Syriac memro (metrical ode) written by a priest from Habsnas. Gregorius Behnam Ḥabīb of Arbo was metropolitan bishop of Jerusalem from 1590 until his death in 1614. Yuhanna Addai of Arbo (d. 1723) was ordained as a bishop by Ignatius Denha, patriarch of Tur Abdin. The Monastery of Mar Shim’un near Arbo was inhabited by five monks in 1738. Ignatius Barsoum of Arbo, previously metropolitan bishop of the Mor Malke Monastery, was patriarch of Tur Abdin in 1740–1791. Ignatius Aho of Arbo and Ignatius Isaiah of Arbo both served as patriarch of Tur Abdin in 1791–1816. Arbo was attacked by Kurds on 15 May 1801, resulting in the death of most of the men and women and thirteen priests, and the villagers' cattle was seized, leaving those who remained to suffer from cholera and famine. There were nine priests at Arbo in 1825. Severus ʿAbd al-Nūr of Arbo claimed to be patriarch of Tur Abdin in 1834–1839.

The village was attacked by the forces of Bedir Khan Beg of Bohtan and Mir Sayf al-Din in November 1839 and many villagers, including one priest and one deacon, were killed whilst Arbo was set on fire and its citadel was destroyed. The churches of the Mother of God and Mar Dimet were destroyed and the tombs were exhumed and the bodies were set on fire. Bedir Khan Beg reportedly rode his horse over the remains of a church destroyed by his men at Arbo. Sixty men were taken captive to Amid, of whom forty died. The monk Dawud of Arbo is attested at the Monastery of Mar Awgin in 1853. In the Syriac Orthodox patriarchal register of dues of 1870, it was recorded that the village had 68 households, who paid 160 dues, and the village was served by 3 priests.

Most of the Syriacs who settled at Girefshe and Qewetla originated in Arbo. The Syriac Catholic bishop Gabriel Tappouni recorded that the village was populated by about 600 Syriacs in 100 families and were served by one priest in 1913. In 1914, it was inhabited by 300 Syriacs, according to the list presented to the Paris Peace Conference by the Assyro-Chaldean delegation. It was administered as part of the kaza (district) of Midyat. The village was located in the diocese of the Mor Malke Monastery. Amidst the Sayfo, the Syriacs of Arbo took refuge at the Mor Malke Monastery and the Mor Eliyo Monastery. The village had a population of 304 in 1960. There were 304 Turoyo-speaking Christians in 40 families at Arbo in 1966.

Arbo was completely abandoned in 1989. In 2006, a project to build eight new houses was started by some of the villagers with the intention to return. In the following year, the houses were completed and several families consequently returned to the village. The Church of the Virgin Mary was renovated by the villagers and reopened in 2014. The churches of Mor Dimet and Mor Shalito, which had begun renovation in 2017, were reopened in August 2018. The village was declared a special security zone from 4 August to 18 August 2023. In October 2025, the municipality of Nusaybin approved a request by villagers to restore the original Syriac name of the village, being the second village after Beth Kustan to have its original name restored.

== Demography ==
The following is a list of the number of Syriac Orthodox families that have inhabited Arbo per year stated. Unless otherwise stated, all figures are from the list provided in The Syrian Orthodox Christians in the Late Ottoman Period and Beyond: Crisis then Revival, as noted in the bibliography below.

- 1915: 70
- 1966: 40
- 1978: 40
- 1979: 33
- 1981: 24
- 1987: 10

== Notable people ==
- Attiya Gamri (b. 1972), Dutch-Assyrian politician
- George Aryo (b. 1958), Turkish-Assyrian politician

== Bibliography ==
- Abed Mshiho Neman of Qarabash (2021) [1918]. Sayfo – An Account of the Assyrian Genocide. Translated by Michael Abdalla; Łukasz Kiczko. Edinburgh University Press.
- BarAbraham, Abdulmesih (2021). "Returning Home: The Ambivalent Assyrian Experience in Turkey". Poligrafi. 26 (101/102): 153–176.
- Barsoum, Aphrem (2003). The Scattered Pearls: A History of Syriac Literature and Sciences. Translated by Matti Moosa (2nd ed.). Gorgias Press.
- Barsoum, Aphrem (2008a). History of the Za'faran Monastery. Translated by Matti Moosa. Gorgias Press.
- Barsoum, Aphrem (2008b). The History of Tur Abdin. Translated by Matti Moosa. Gorgias Press.
- Bcheiry, Iskandar (2009). The Syriac Orthodox Patriarchal Register of Dues of 1870: An Unpublished Historical Document from the Late Ottoman Period. Gorgias Press.
- Bcheiry, Iskandar (2013). The Account of the Syriac Orthodox Patriarch Yūḥanun Bar Šay Allāh (1483–1492): The Syriac Manuscript of Cambridge: DD.3.8(1). Gorgias Press.
- Bcheiry, Iskandar (2019). "Digitizing and Schematizing the Archival Material from the Late Ottoman Period Found in the Monastery of al-Zaʿfarān in Southeast Turkey". Atla Summary of Proceedings. 72 (January): 50–61. doi:10.31046/proceedings.2018.113.
- Biner, Zerrin Özlem (2020). States of Dispossession: Violence and Precarious Coexistence in Southeast Turkey. University of Pennsylvania Press.
- Bizzeti, Paolo; Chialà, Sabino (2024). Turchia: Chiese e monasteri di tradizione siriaca (in Italian) (2nd ed.). Edizioni Terra Santa.
- Burleson, Samuel; Van Rompay, Lucas (2011). "List of Patriarchs: II. The Syriac Orthodox Church and its Uniate continuations". In Sebastian P. Brock; Aaron M. Butts; George A. Kiraz; Lucas Van Rompay (eds.). Gorgias Encyclopedic Dictionary of the Syriac Heritage: Electronic Edition. Gorgias Press.
- Carlson, Thomas A. (2018). Christianity in Fifteenth-Century Iraq (PDF). Cambridge University Press.
- Courtois, Sébastien de (2004). The Forgotten Genocide: Eastern Christians, The Last Arameans. Translated by Vincent Aurora. Gorgias Press.
- Dinno, Khalid S. (2017). The Syrian Orthodox Christians in the Late Ottoman Period and Beyond: Crisis then Revival. Gorgias Press.
- Gaunt, David (2006). Massacres, Resistance, Protectors: Muslim-Christian Relations in Eastern Anatolia during World War I. Gorgias Press.
- Jongerden, Joost; Verheij, Jelle, eds. (2012). Social Relations in Ottoman Diyarbekir, 1870-1915. Brill.
- Keser-Kayaalp, Elif, ed. (January 2022). Syriac Architectural Heritage at Risk in TurʿAbdin (PDF).
- Palmer, Andrew (1990). Monk and Mason on the Tigris Frontier: The Early History of Tur Abdin. Cambridge University Press.
- Ritter, Hellmut (1967). Turoyo: Die Volkssprache der Syrischen Christen des Tur 'Abdin (in German). Vol. 1. Franz Steiner Verlag.
- Sinclair, T.A. (1989). Eastern Turkey: An Architectural & Archaeological Survey. Vol. III. Pindar Press.
- Tan, Altan (2018). Turabidin'den Berriye'ye. Aşiretler - Dinler - Diller - Kültürler (in Turkish). Pak Ajans Yayincilik Turizm Ve Diş Ticaret Limited şirketi. ISBN 9789944360944.
