= Kaleli, Nusaybin =

Village in Mardin Province, Turkey

Kaleli
- Neighbourhood
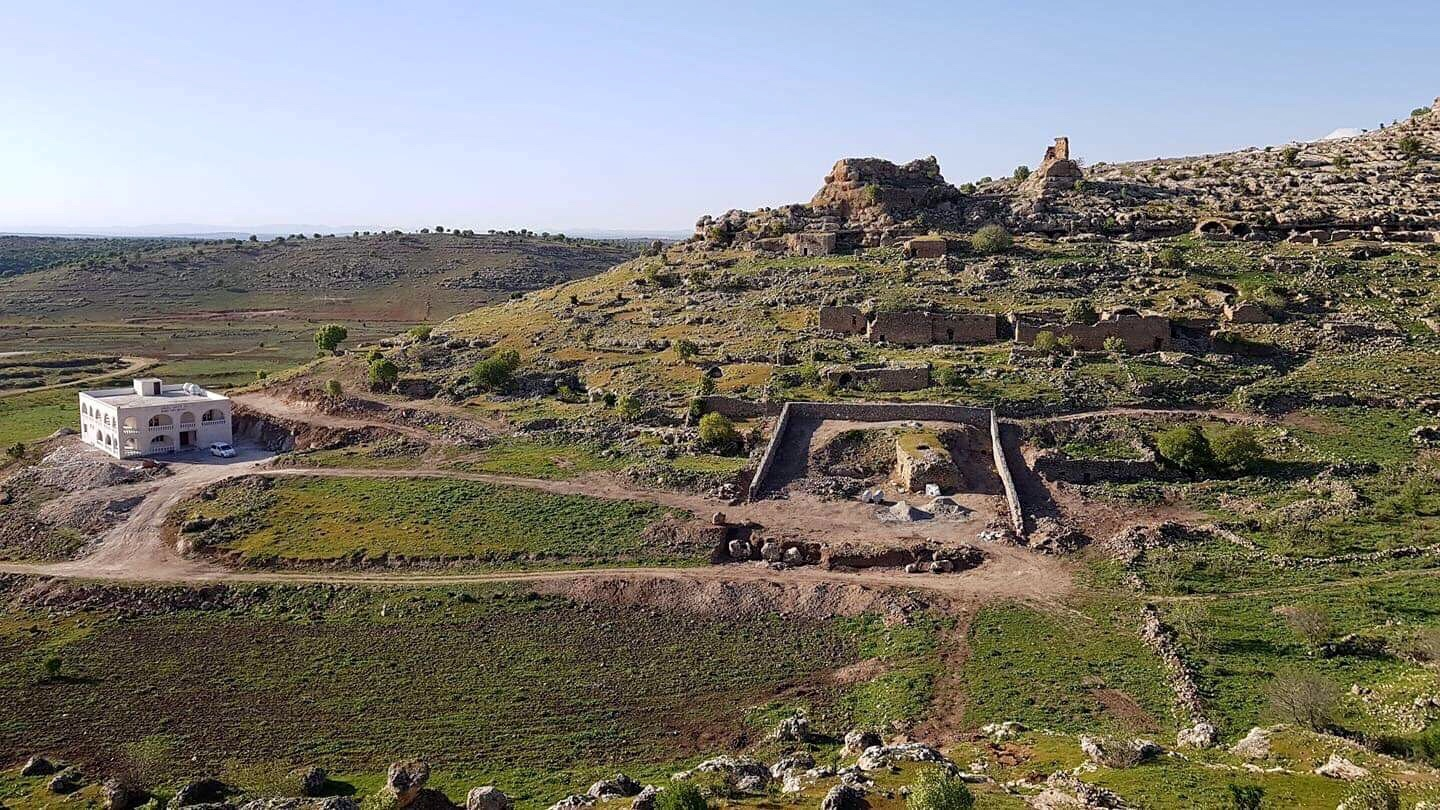

- Location within Turkey
- Coordinates: 37°14′46″N 41°29′30″E
- Country: Turkey
- Province: Mardin
- District: Nusaybin
- Population (2021): 0
- Time zone: UTC+3 (TRT)

Kaleli (Kurdish: Efşê;, Syriac: Girefshe) (Note: Alternatively transliterated as Efşi, Gerfashe, Girefş, Grafshé, or Kerefché.) is a former village in the municipality and district of Nusaybin, the Mardin Province. The village was populated by Yazidi Kurds of the Dasikan tribe. It was unpopulated as of 2021.

== History ==
Girefshe (today called Kaleli) was historically inhabited by Syriac Orthodox Christians. The village was owned by Jallo Hanna. The Syriac Catholic bishop Gabriel Tappouni recorded that 150 Syriacs in 30 families populated Girefshe in 1913 and were served by one priest. It was inhabited by 400 Syriacs in 1914, as per the list presented to the Paris Peace Conference by the Assyro-Chaldean delegation. There were 40 Syriac families in 1915, many of whom were originally from Arbo. Amidst the Sayfo, the village's population took refuge at the Monastery of Mor Malke with their property and cattle. By 1987, there were no remaining Syriacs.

Due to the oppressive Turkish state, the village saw a large-scale emigration to Europe from 1985 on. The Yazidis would largely settle in Germany. Prior to the migration, the village had around 130 households of around 500 people but the village was completely left by 1989. Since 2011, many of these families decided to return but were prevented to do so due to Turkish bureaucracy. Feleknas Uca of the HDP took the case to the Turkish Parliament in 2017. The village was declared a special security zone from 4 August to 18 August 2023.

== Bibliography ==
- Courtois, Sébastien de (2004). The Forgotten Genocide: Eastern Christians, The Last Arameans. Translated by Vincent Aurora. Gorgias Press.
- Gaunt, David (2006). Massacres, Resistance, Protectors: Muslim-Christian Relations in Eastern Anatolia during World War I. Gorgias Press.
- Jongerden, Joost; Verheij, Jelle, eds. (2012). Social Relations in Ottoman Diyarbekir, 1870-1915. Brill.
- Sediyani, İbrahim (2009). Adını arayan coğrafya. Özedönüş Yayınları. p. 256. ISBN 9786054296002.
- Tan, Altan (2018). Turabidin'den Berriye'ye. Aşiretler - Dinler - Diller - Kültürler (in Turkish). Pak Ajans Yayincilik Turizm Ve Diş Ticaret Limited şirketi. p. 169. ISBN 9789944360944.
