= Attiya Gamri =

Dutch-Assyrian politician from Turkey

- ܥܜܝܐ ܓܡܪܝ
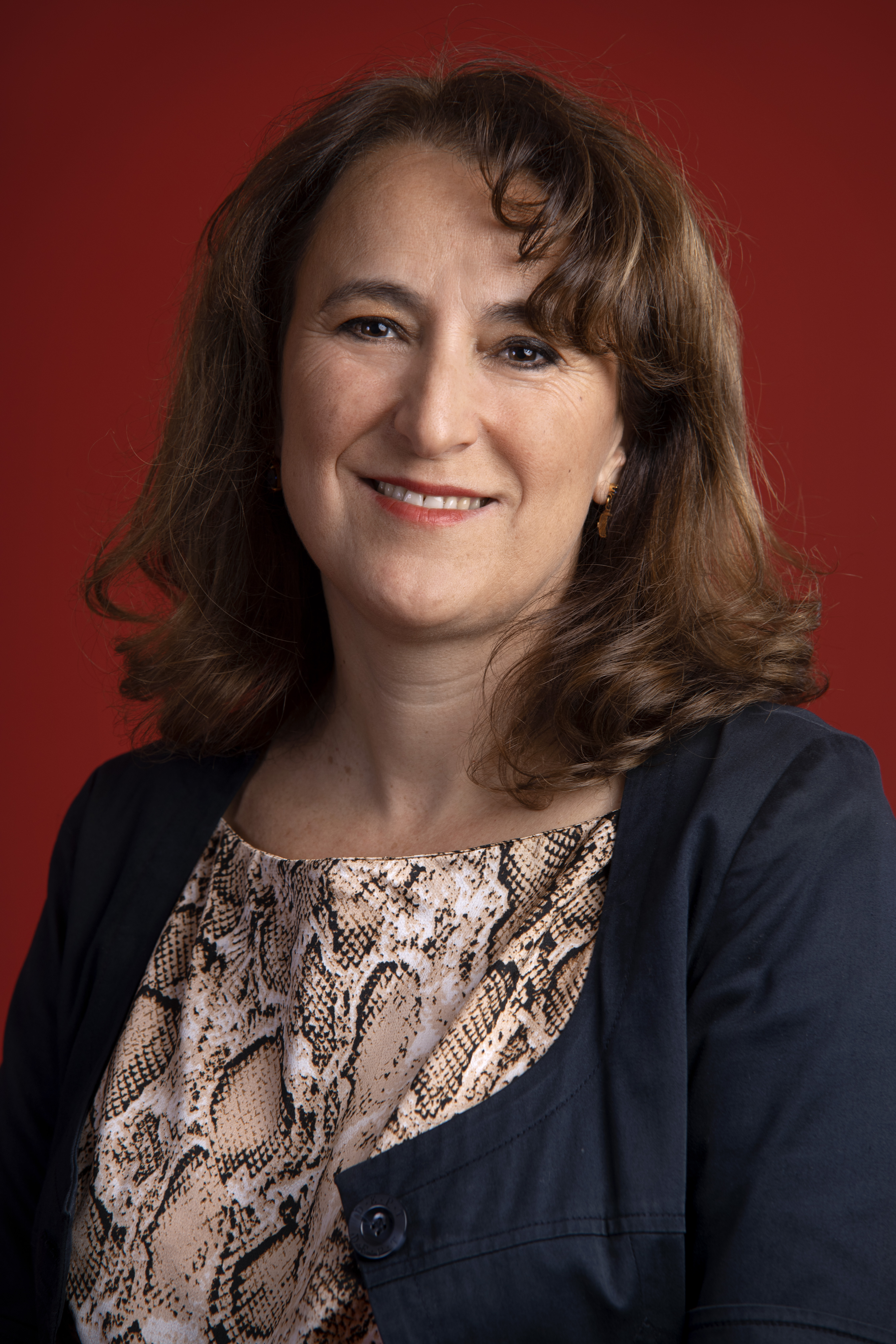
- Attiya Gamri in 2020

Member of the States of Overijssel
- In office 2003–2011

Personal details
- Born: Attiya Gamri; 1972 (age 53–54) Arbo, Tur Abdin, Turkey
- Party: Labour Party
- Website: https://www.attiya.nl/

Attiya Gamri (born 1972, Syriac: ܥܜܝܐ ܓܡܪܝ) is a Dutch politician and former member of the Provincial Council of Overijssel in the Netherlands. She is most well known for her political advocacy for Assyrians and their human rights in West Asia, as well as for her participation in Dutch politics.

== Early life ==
Gamri is originally from Arbo (Taşköy in Turkish) in Tur Abdin, Turkey to an ethnic Assyrian family. Her grandfather was previously mayor of the village. From a young age, Gamri was a first-hand witness to intimidation against Assyrians in Tur Abdin, when her mother was attacked and harassed by Kurds. She and her family left Tur Abdin for the Netherlands in 1980, and settled in Twente. During her years at university, she began heavy involvement in Assyrian activities and organizations.

Gamri has stated that she used to desire becoming a police officer before her father stopped her from doing so. She aspired to become a politician from a young age based on her experiences in Tur Abdin, and graduated with a Bachelor of Science in social sciences in 1995. She earned a Master's degree in management in 2003.

== Political career ==
Gamri was first elected as a member of the States of Overijssel in 2003, where she stayed for eight years. On 18 April 2011, Gamri was re-elected to a third term on the Provincial Council of Overijssel for four years, representing the province of North Holland.

Gamri has previously been critical of the lack of participation of women in government in the Dutch Labour Party, and has stated that there needs to be more support for women who want to get involved in party politics. In 2021, she became the first woman of Assyrian heritage to contest a national election in Europe.

Since July 2022, Gamri has been an alderman for the town of Bloemendaal. As alderman for the town, Gamri specializes in housing and has previously advocated for better housing and facilitating relocations. She has also participated in other local public work projects in Bloemandaal.

=== Assyrian advocacy ===
Gamri has been a staunch advocate for Assyrian rights and initiatives throughout her career as a politician, having made several visits to areas in the Assyrian homeland such as a trip to Urmia in 2005. In 2008, she was selected as Zinda Magazine's "Assyrian of the Year", citing her continuous work and her resilience in leading by example for Assyrians across the world. She would be the last person selected for the title before the magazine shut down the following year. Gamri was also a founding member of the Assyrian Federation of the Netherlands and the first chairwoman of the Assyrian Confederation of Europe.

In 2023, Gamri delivered a speech at the United Nations in Geneva in defense of Assyrian women in Turkey, Iraq, and Syria who were unable to speak up about their persecution. Gamri led a conference of young Assyrian leaders, which she discussed as part of an Assyria TV interview in Turoyo. In the same year, she attended the Tur Abdin International Symposium as a guest speaker, returning to the region to deliver an opening speech.

Gamri has previously emphasized engagement in dialogue regarding the Assyrian genocide with ethnic Turks and Kurds, and has expressed hope for the future of human rights for Assyrians in Turkey.

== Personal life ==
Attiya was married in 2008 to Andreas van Diepen, a Dutch engineer who studied in the Netherlands and Argentina, in a special ceremony at the Mor Mattai Monastery in the Nineveh Plains. She is the mother of two girls, and has seven siblings (four sisters and three brothers).

Gamri can speak Dutch, English, and the Turoyo dialect of Neo-Aramaic. She is a member of the Syriac Orthodox Church.

Preceded by Sarkis Aghajan Mamendo	Zinda Magazine Assyrian of the Year; 2008 (6757)	Succeeded by Award discontinued
