= George Mansour =

Iraqi politician (born 1952)

George Mansour (born December 25, 1952) is an Iraqi journalist, broadcaster and politician, a Minister of Region for Civil Society Affairs and founder and first General Manager for Ishtar Broadcasting Corporation (Ishtar TV) till June 2006. He is multilingual with proficiency in Arabic, English, Kurdish, Turkish, Russian, Persian and Syriac.

He was born in Kirkuk and studied engineering in Printing Technology and Media and had high diplomas in Philosophy and Education.

In 2003, he was General Manager at SAIC for Iraqi Media Network (IMN) TV (Aliraqia), Editor-in-chief of its TV News and producer and host to Iraqi Media Network IMN radio and TV shows. Other journalistic responsibilities included broadcasting at Radio Free Iraq in Prague, correspondent of Az Zaman and Al-Mutamar newspapers based in London, England, reporter at Sawt Alshab Al Iraqi radio based in Saudi Arabia and Radio Canada International based in Toronto and Senior Advisor for the International Organization for Migration - Canada.

He is member of many national and international organizations including International Organization of Journalists, the Kurdistan Journalists’ Union, the Canadian Iraqi Coordination Committee, the Organization for Civil Society in Iraq, the Iraqi Forum for Democracy (IFD) and participant in many international conferences in Kurdistan, Iraq and abroad and member of KRG's Honour Killing Monitoring Commission and President of the Iraqi Society of Human Rights-Canada.
