= Sarkis Aghajan Mamendo =

Iraqi Assyrian politician

Sarkis Aghajan Mamendo ܣܪܟܝܣ ܐܓܓܢ ܡܡܢܕܘ

Minister of Finance and the Economy
- In office 1999 – 7 May 2006 (in office unofficially until 2008 when another person was given the position)
- Prime Minister: Nechirvan Barzani
- Succeeded by: Bayiz Saeed Mohammad

Representative in the Kurdish Parliament
- In office 1992–1999
- Leader: Masoud Barzani

Personal details
- Born: 1962 (age 63–64) Diana, Iraq
- Party: Kurdistan Democratic Party

Sarkis Aghajan Mamendo (Syriac: ܣܪܟܝܣ ܐܓܓܢ ܡܡܢܕܘ), (born 1962) is an Iraqi Assyrian politician who was appointed Minister for Finance and Economy in the cabinet of Iraqi Kurdistan on 7 May 2006.

== Early life ==
Sarkis was born in Diyana, Erbil Governorate of Iraqi Kurdistan in 1962. He is an Assyrian with family origins from the Nochiya tribe. He was first elected into the Kurdistan National Assembly in the first Iraqi Kurdistan elections in 1992, beginning his political career. Sarkis Aghajan Mamendo was also the Minister for Finance and the Economy from 1999 to 2006, and Deputy Prime Minister from 2004 to 2006 in the Arbil and Dohuk administration.

== Activities ==
Sarkis is known, in addition to his political roles, for massive development and aid programs he has begun in which he built or repaired dozens of Churches, roads, schools and Assyrian settlements throughout northern Iraq through the "Higher Committee for Christian Affairs" that he established. He is also a major funder and owner of the new Assyrian TV channel Ishtar TV, which is broadcast in three languages (Syriac, Arabic, and Kurdish).

== Awards and controversies ==
In August 2006, Sarkis was awarded the "Knight Commander of the order of Saint Gregory the Great" by Pope Benedict XVI as a way to honour his work helping the Assyrian Christian community in Iraq. Aghajan was awarded the title, which is one of the highest and most widely recognized pontifical orders, for his contribution to the Assyrian community and his work for Christians in Iraq.

Many Assyrian non-governmental organizations claim that the Kurdistan Regional Government only appointed Aghajan to a high office in the Kurdish government in order to look tolerant towards Assyrians so that they could justify a possible annexation of Assyrian settlements in the Nineveh Plains. It has also been speculated that he gets some of his funding from lobbying efforts in the United States by the Assyrian American congresswoman Anna Eshoo for the purpose of rebuilding Assyrian settlements, although he personally claims that the money is raised by Kurdish political parties instead.

He also finances his own militia which is accused of assaulting Assyrian candidates during the 2009 Governorates Elections in Nineveh.

== Disappearance and reappearance ==
For a period during 2008-2009 the Assyrian Finance minister went missing. Many people believed that he was kidnapped or the victim of assassination. Part of this speculation was due to the fact that around the same period he went missing more than 20,000 Assyrian had been displaced and 13 killed in Mosul as part of a pogrom in 2008, and there were rumors of Corruption in the Kurdistan government, and as finance minister he might have been aware of it, leading to speculation that he might have been killed to cover it up. However, after going missing, a new finance minister was appointed, and then shortly after being replaced he was found again in the summer of 2009, when he appeared in his palace in Ankawa in what he claimed to be a medical vacation outside the country. He stopped giving funds to Assyrian Christian Communities, causing the Chaldean Catholic Church to have significant financial issues during the 2008 financial crisis, and as a result it was forced to sell land it held in the center of Baghdad.

Preceded by Nuri Kino	Zinda Magazine Assyrian of the Year; 2007 (6756)	Succeeded by Attiya Gamri
