= Eskihisar, Nusaybin =

Village in Mardin Province, Turkey

Eskihisar
- Neighbourhood
- Location in Turkey
- Coordinates: 37.165°N 41.388°E
- Country: Turkey
- Province: Mardin
- District: Nusaybin
- Population (2021): 162
- Time zone: UTC+3 (TRT)

Eskihisar (Note: Also spelt as Eski Hisar.) (Kurdish: Marinê; Syriac: Maʿarrīn) (Note: Alternatively transliterated as M’are, M’arē, M’ārī, M`arre, M‘arré, M’arrin, Marin, Mâarin, Ma’are, Ma’ren, or Ma'arre.) is a neighbourhood in the municipality and district of Nusaybin, Mardin Province in Turkey. The village is populated by Kurds of the Çomeran tribe and had a population of 162 in 2021. It is located atop Mount Izla in the historic region of Tur Abdin.

== History ==
Maʿarrīn (today called Eskihisar) was historically inhabited by Christians belonging to the Church of the East. In the late 12th century, the village began to flourish and seems to have expanded under the Artuqids prior to the onset of decline from the mid-13th century onwards. In 1271, 70 villagers from Maʿarrīn helped reconstruct the church of the nearby Monastery of Mar Awgin alongside its monks and those of the Mar Yohannan Monastery on the initiative of ʿAbdīshōʿ Bar Mshak of Gaṣlōnā, metropolitan of Nisibis, according to a historical note by the sixteenth-century monk Abraham of Kirkuk. The restoration took place under the supervision of the architect Raḥmūn. In the first half of the fourteenth century, the village gained a community of Syriac Orthodox Christians who were served by the bishop of Ma'arre, Nisibis, and Gazarta of Qardu.

In 1403 (AG 1714), Maʿarrīn was destroyed alongside Nisibis, the nearby villages of Hbab and Arbo, and the Monastery of Mar Shim’un at Arbo during an attack on the Beth Risha region by the lords of Hisn Kifa. Philoxenus Ibrahim of Manim’am, Syriac Orthodox metropolitan of the diocese of Arbo, Nisibis, M’arē, and Kartwoytō, also known as the diocese of Beth Risha, is attested in 1454 (AG 1765). He had been ordained by Ignatius Qoma, patriarch of Tur Abdin, and was transferred to the diocese of Amid in 1455. The village's decline was halted briefly in the 16th century in the early Ottoman period.

The diocese of Maʿarrīn is mentioned in 1562 in a letter from the patriarch Abdisho IV Maron to Pope Pius IV amongst those that recognised his authority. The Church of the Forty Martyrs at Maʿarrīn was likely restored in 1569/1570. It has been suggested that the Church of the Beni Shmūni at Maʿarrīn, which had originally belonged to the Church of the East, was taken over by the Syriac Orthodox Church at some point in the seventeenth or eighteenth centuries, probably as a result of the villagers' conversion amidst the schism between traditionalists and Catholics in the Church of the East. All of the Christians at Maʿarrīn adhered to the Syriac Orthodox Church by 1766. The village may have been deserted at one point and subsequently resettled by Syriac Orthodox Christians in the 19th century. In the Syriac Orthodox patriarchal register of dues of 1870, it was recorded that the village had 23 households, who paid 60 dues, and it had one priest.

The Syriac Catholic bishop Gabriel Tappouni recorded that 80 Syriacs in 15 families lived at Maʿarrīn in 1913 and were served by one priest. In 1914, the village was inhabited by 400 Syriacs, as per the list presented to the Paris Peace Conference by the Assyro-Chaldean delegation. There were 50 Syriac families in 1915. It was located in the kaza (district) of Habab, attached to the kaza of Nisibis. The village served as the residence of the chief of the Kurdish tribe of Hajo of the Haverkan confederation. Amidst the Sayfo, the Syriac villagers were murdered by local Kurds in 1915 and the Church of the Beni Shmūni was converted into a mosque. It was mostly deserted by 1978 and was used as a Bedouin encampment. By 1987, there were no remaining Syriacs.

== Bibliography ==
- Al-Jeloo, Nicholas (2015). "Transferrable Religious Heritage: Church Buildings in Northern Mesopotamia". Le patrimoine architectural de l'Église orthodoxe d'Antioche: Perspectives comparatives avec les autres groupes religieux du Moyen-Orient et des régions limitrophes. Publications of the University of Balamand. pp. 111–127.
- Barsoum, Aphrem (2008). The History of Tur Abdin. Translated by Matti Moosa. Gorgias Press.
- Bcheiry, Iskandar (2009). The Syriac Orthodox Patriarchal Register of Dues of 1870: An Unpublished Historical Document from the Late Ottoman Period. Gorgias Press.
- Bcheiry, Iskandar (2013). The Account of the Syriac Orthodox Patriarch Yūḥanun Bar Šay Allāh (1483–1492): The Syriac Manuscript of Cambridge: DD.3.8(1). Gorgias Press.
- Courtois, Sébastien de (2004). The Forgotten Genocide: Eastern Christians, The Last Arameans. Translated by Vincent Aurora. Gorgias Press.
- Gaunt, David (2006). Massacres, Resistance, Protectors: Muslim-Christian Relations in Eastern Anatolia during World War I. Gorgias Press.
- Jongerden, Joost; Verheij, Jelle, eds. (2012). Social Relations in Ottoman Diyarbekir, 1870-1915. Brill.
- Sinclair, T.A. (1989). Eastern Turkey: An Architectural & Archaeological Survey. Vol. 3. Pindar Press.
- Tan, Altan (2018). Turabidin'den Berriye'ye. Aşiretler - Dinler - Diller - Kültürler (in Turkish). Pak Ajans Yayincilik Turizm Ve Diş Ticaret Limited şirketi. ISBN 9789944360944.
- Wilmshurst, David (2000). The Ecclesiastical Organisation of the Church of the East, 1318–1913 (PDF). Peeters Publishers.
