= Suryoyo Sat =

Suryoyo Sat - ܣܘܪܝܝܐ ܣܬ
- Headquarters: Södertälje, Sweden

Programming
- Languages: Aramaic, Arabic & English

Ownership
- Owner: Bahro Suryoyo Mediaförening

History
- Launched: January, 2006

Links
- Website: www.suryoyosat.com

Suryoyo Sat (Syriac: ܣܘܪܝܝܐ ܣܬ) is an Aramaic language TV channel broadcasting from Södertälje, Sweden. The channel is broadcast to more than 80 countries.

Suryoyo Sat's programming is mainly conducted in Turoyo Neo-Aramaic and to a lesser extent in English and Arabic.

== Manipulation scandal ==
In April 2013, the Södertälje-based daily newspaper Länstidningen (LT) accused Suryoyo SAT of manipulation of a photo taken during Abdullah Güls, then President of Turkey, visit in Sweden. In the picture, where Gül poses with a Syriac Orthodox archbishop and a number of representatives from the Assyrian and Syriac-Aramaic federations in Sweden, Suryoyo SAT replaced one of the Assyrian representatives with a Syriac-Aramaic one. Two days later, Suryoyo SAT apologized for the incident, saying that the involved persons had been warned.

== See also ==
- ANB SAT
- Ishtar TV
- KBSV
- Suroyo TV
