= Suroyo TV =

Suroyo TV ܦܪܣ ܚܙܘܐ ܣܘܪܝܐ
- Headquarters: Södertälje, Sweden

Ownership
- Owner: Babylon Media Föreningen

History
- Launched: October 10, 2004

Links
- Website: Website; Youtube channel

Suroyo TV (Syriac: ܦܪܣ ܚܙܘܐ ܣܘܪܝܐ) is an Assyrian satellite television channel. Suroyo TV broadcasts from their studios in Södertälje, Sweden. Suroyo TV is a voice for the Assyrian people and their cultural heritage, history and language, as such affiliated with the secular, leftist nationalist Dawronoye movement. The channel is mainly transmitted in Surayt and Arabic but they also have some content in Sureth, Swedish, English, and Turkish.

== See also ==
- ANB SAT
- Ishtar TV
- KBSV
- Suryoyo Sat
