= Zinda Magazine =

Zinda Magazine was an online English-language Assyrian magazine based in the United States, The magazine was established by Wilfred Bet-Alkhas in 1994. The first issue of the magazine was published on 6 February 1995 with the name Zenda. Later its name was changed to Zinda. The headquarters was in Washington DC. The magazine had 30,000 subscribers from 45 countries in 2005. It awarded annual Assyrian of the Year. The magazine was closed in 2009.
