= Assyrian diaspora =

Assyrians living outside their ancestral homeland

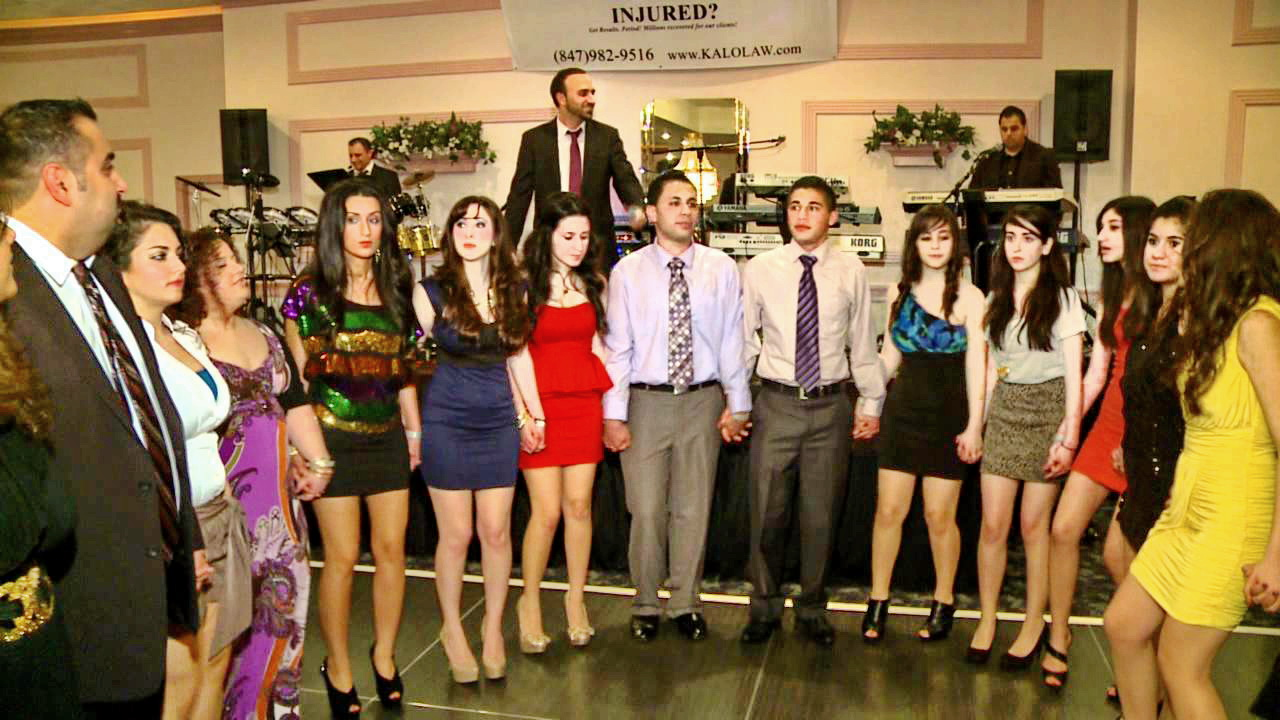
An Assyrian folk dance at an Assyrian party in Chicago

The Assyrian diaspora (Syriac: ܓܠܘܬܐ, romanized: Galuta, lit. 'exile') refers to ethnic Assyrians living in communities outside their ancestral homeland. The Eastern Aramaic-speaking Assyrians claim descent from the ancient Assyrians and are one of the few ancient Semitic ethnicities in the Near East who resisted Arabization, Turkification, Persianization and Islamization during and after the Muslim conquest of Iraq, Iran, Syria and Turkey.

The indigenous Assyrian homeland is within the borders of northern Iraq, southeastern Turkey, northwestern Iran, and northeastern Syria, a region roughly corresponding with Assyria from the 25th century BC to the 7th century AD. Assyrians are predominantly Christians; most are members of the Assyrian Church of the East, the Ancient Church of the East, the Chaldean Catholic Church, the Syriac Orthodox Church, the Syriac Catholic Church, the Assyrian Pentecostal Church and the Assyrian Evangelical Church. The terms "Syriac", "Chaldean" and "Chaldo-Assyrian" can be used to describe ethnic Assyrians by their religious affiliation, and indeed the terms "Syriac" and "Syrian" are much later derivatives of the original "Assyrian", and historically, geographically and ethnically originally meant Assyrian (see Name of Syria).

Before the Assyrian genocide, the Assyrian people were largely unmoved from their native lands which they had occupied for about 5,000 years. Although a handful of Assyrians had migrated to the United Kingdom during the Victorian era, the Assyrian diaspora began in earnest during World War I (1914–1918) as the Ottoman Empire conducted both large scale genocide and ethnic cleansing against the Assyrian people with the aid of local Kurdish, Iranian and Arab tribes. This genocide was coordinated alongside the Armenian genocide, Greek genocide and Great Famine of Mount Lebanon.

Further atrocities such as the Simele massacres of the 1930s also stimulated emigration.

Additional emigration occurred in the 1980s, as Assyrian communities fled the violence of the Kurdish–Turkish conflict and the establishment of the Islamic Republic of Iran. During the 1990s and 2000s, Assyrians left the Middle East to evade persecution in Ba'athist Iraq and from Muslim fundamentalists. The exodus continued into the mid-2010s, as Assyrians fled Iraq and northeastern Syria due to genocide by the Islamic State and other Sunni Islamist groups.

== Former USSR ==
From 1937 to 1959, the Assyrian population in the Soviet Union grew by 587.3 percent.

=== Former Soviet Union ===
==== History ====
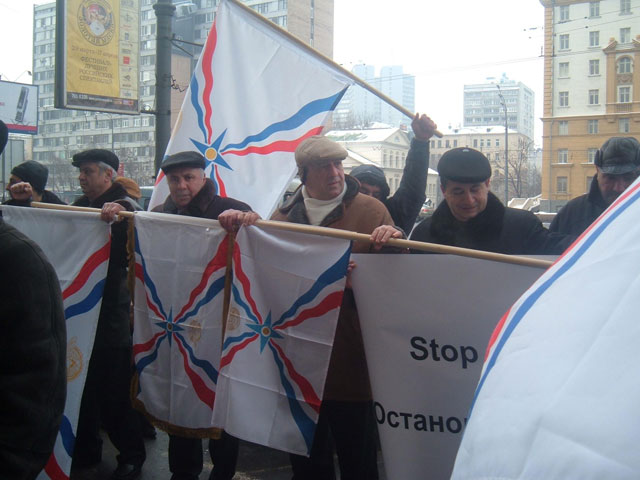
Assyrians in Russia protesting Iraqi church bombings in 2006

Assyrians came to Russia and the Soviet Union in three large waves. The first wave was after the Treaty of Turkmenchay in 1828, that delineated a border between Russia and Persia. The second was as a result of the Assyrian genocide during and after World War I; the third was after World War II, when the Soviet Union unsuccessfully tried to establish a satellite state in Iran.

Soviet troops withdrew in 1946, and left the Assyrians (who supported the coup) exposed to retaliation identical to that received from the Turks 30 years earlier. Soviet authorities persecuted Assyrian religious and community leaders in the same way that they persecuted Russians who remained members of the Russian Orthodox Church.

Most Assyrians are members of the Assyrian Church of the East; other churches include the Syriac Orthodox Church and the Chaldean Catholic Church.

=== USSR census ===
- 1897 census: 5,300 "Assyrians" (by language)
- 1919 refugee status:

7,000–8,000 Assyrian refugees in Tbilisi
2,000 Assyrians in Yerevan
15,000 Assyrians from Hakkari, 10,000 from Urmia and Salmas in the Russian region of Rostov

- 1926 census: 9,808 Assyrians (Aisor)
- 1959 census: 21,083 Assyrians
- 1970 census: 24,294 Assyrians
- 1979 census: 25,170 Assyrians
- 1989 census: 26,289 Assyrians

=== Russia ===
- 1989 census: 9,600 Assyrians, of whom 4,742 spoke the Syriac language; 1,738 in the Krasnodar region
- 2002 census: 13,649 Assyrians (ассирийцы)

=== Armenia ===
- 1926 (Soviet) census: 21,215 Assyrians
- 1989 (Soviet) census: 5,963 Assyrians
- 2001 census: 3,409 Assyrians (3rd minority ethnic group after Yazidis and Russians): 524 urban, 2,485 rural
- 2011 census: 2,769 Assyrians

=== Georgia ===
- 1926 census: 2,904 Assyrians
- 1989 census: 6,206 Assyrians
- 2002 census: 3,299 Assyrians

=== Ukraine ===
- 2001 census: 3,143

=== Kazakhstan ===
- 2005 estimates: 540 (270 in Almaty)

== Lebanon ==
Estimates on December 31, 1944, by province (muhafazah)
| Denomination | Beyrouth | Mount Lebanon | North Lebanon | South Lebanon | Biqa' | Total |
|---|---|---|---|---|---|---|
| Syriac Catholics | 4,089 | 275 | 169 | 9 | 442 | 4,984 |
| Syriac Orthodox | 2,070 | 209 | 100 | 22 | 1,352 | 3,753 |
| Chaldean Catholic | 974 | 120 | 1 | 10 | 225 | 1,330 |

1932 census and later estimates
| Denomination | 1932 census | 1944 estimates | 1954 estimates |
|---|---|---|---|
| Syriac Catholics | 2,675 | 4,984 | – |
| Chaldean Catholics | 528 | 1,330 | – |
| Syriac Orthodox | 2,574 | 3,753 | 4,200 |
| Church Of The East | 800 | 1,200 | 1,400 |

== North America ==
=== Canada ===
- 2001 Census: 6,980 Assyrians
- 2006 Census: 8,650
- 2011 Census: 10,810

=== United States ===
- 1990 census: 46,099 Assyrians
  - 19,066 born in the U.S.
  - 16,783 arrived before 1980.
  - 10,250 from 1980 to 1990
  - 27,494 listed Syriac as the "Language Spoken at Home"
  - Unemployment: 9.1 Percent
- 2000 census: 82,355 Assyrians/Chaldeans/Syrians
  - 34,484 in Michigan:
    - Sterling Heights: 5,515 (4.4 percent of the city)
    - West Bloomfield: 4,874 (7.5 percent)
    - Southfield: 3,684 (4.7 percent)
    - Warren: 2,625 (1.9 percent)
    - Farmington Hills 2,499 (3 percent)
    - Troy: 2,047 (2.5 percent)
    - Detroit, Michigan 1,963 (0.2 percent)
    - Oak Park 1,864 (6.3 percent)
    - Madison Heights: 1,428 (4.6 percent)
    - Orchard Lake Village: 241 (10.9 percent)
  - 22,671 in California:
  - 15,685 in Illinois
    - Chicago: 7,121 (0.2 percent)
    - Niles, Illinois: 3,410 (3.3 percent)
    - Maine Township, Park Ridge: 1,035 (0.8 percent)
  - Syriac speakers: 46,932

== South America ==
=== Argentina ===
In Argentina the Syriac Orthodox Church counts with a Patriarchal Vicar. However, the actual number of Assyrians is hard to know because the Argentine Census does not ask for ethnicity. Furthermore, their assimilation rate is very high, as it happens with other Middle Eastern communities settled in the country. There is an Assyrian presence in Buenos Aires, La Plata, Córdoba, Salta and Frías. In the past, intellectuals like Farid Nuzha went into exile in Argentina. Although 2,000 Assyrians are listed in Argentina, the actual number may be lower.

== Europe ==
=== Belgium ===
Assyrians arrived in Belgium primarily as refugees from the Turkish towns of Midyat and Mardin in Tur Abdin. Most belong to the Syriac Orthodox Church, but some belong to the Assyrian Church of the East and the Chaldean Catholic Church. Their three main settlements are in the Brussels municipalities of Saint-Josse-ten-Noode (where their municipal councilman, Christian Democrat Ibrahim Erkan, is originally from Turkey) and Etterbeek, Liège and Mechelen.

Two more councilmen were elected in Etterbeek on October 8, 2006: the Liberal Sandrine Es (whose family is from Turkey) and the Christian Democrat Ibrahim Hanna (from Syria's Khabur region). Flemish author August Thiry wrote Mechelen aan de Tigris (Mechelen on the Tigris) about Assyrian refugees from Hassana in the southeastern Turkish district of Silopi. Municipal candidate Melikan Kucam is one of them. In the October 14, 2012 municipal elections, Kucam was elected in Mechelen as a member of the Flemisch nationalists N-VA.

=== France ===
An estimated 20,000 Assyrians live in France, primarily concentrated in the northern French suburbs of Sarcelles (where several thousand Chaldean Catholics live) and in Gonesse and Villiers-le-Bel. They are from several villages in southeastern Turkey.

=== Germany ===
The number of Assyrians in Germany is estimated at 100,000. Most Assyrian immigrants and their descendants in Germany live in Munich, Wiesbaden, Paderborn, Essen, Bietigheim-Bissingen, Ahlen, Göppingen, Köln, Hamburg, Berlin, Augsburg and Gütersloh.

Since they were persecuted throughout the 20th century, many Assyrians arrived from Turkey seeking a better life. The first large wave arrived during the 1960s and 1970s as part of the gastarbeiter (guest worker) economic program. Germany was seeking immigrant workers (largely from Turkey) and many Assyrians, seeing opportunities for freedom and success, applied for visas. Assyrians began working in restaurants or in construction, and many began operating their own shops. The first Assyrian immigrants in Germany organized by forming culture clubs and building churches. The second wave came in the 1980s and 1990s as refugees from the Kurdish–Turkish conflict.

=== Greece ===
The first Assyrian migrants arrived in Greece in 1934, and settled in Makronisos (today uninhabited), Keratsini, Pireus, Egaleo and Kalamata. The vast majority of Assyrians (about 2,000) live in Peristeri, a suburb of Athens. There are five Christian Assyrian marriages recorded at St. Paul's Anglican Church in Athens in 1924–25 (the transcripts can be viewed on St. Paul's Anglican Church website), indicating the arrival of refugees at that time.

=== Netherlands ===
The first Assyrians came to the Netherlands in the 1970s, primarily from Turkey and observing the West Syriac Rite. The number of Assyrians in the country is estimated at 25,000 to 35,000. They primarily live in the eastern Netherlands, in Enschede, Hengelo, Oldenzaal and Borne in the province of Overijssel.

=== Sweden ===
In the late 1970s, about 12,000 Assyrians from Turkey, Iran, Iraq and Syria emigrated to Sweden. Although they considered themselves persecuted for religious and ethnic reasons, they were not recognized as refugees. Those who had lived in Sweden for a longer period received residence permits for humanitarian reasons.

Södertälje is considered the unofficial Assyrian capital of Europe because of the city's high percentage of Assyrians. The Assyrian TV channels Suryoyo Sat and Suroyo TV are based in Södertälje. From 2005 to 2006 and since 2014, the Assyrian Ibrahim Baylan has been a minister in the Swedish government.

=== United Kingdom ===
About 8,000 Assyrians live in the United Kingdom, primarily in London and Manchester. The first Assyrians arrived during the 1850s, most immigration began in the 1950s.

== Pacific ==
=== Australia ===
In the 2016 census, 46,217 people identified themselves as having Assyrian ancestry, 0.13 percent of Australia's population. Of the Assyrians in Australia, 21,000 are members of the Assyrian Church of the East and 9,000 are members of the Chaldean Catholic Church. The City of Fairfield, in Sydney, has the country's largest number of Assyrians. In Sydney, Assyrians are the leading ethnic group in the Fairfield LGA suburbs of Fairfield, Fairfield Heights and Greenfield Park.

In Melbourne, Assyrians live in the northwestern suburbs of Broadmeadows, Craigieburn, Meadow Heights, Roxburgh Park and Fawkner. In 2016, Melbourne had 13,812 people who claimed Assyrian ancestry. The Assyrian community is growing, and there are new arrivals from Syria and Iraq, adding to those with origins in Iran, Jordan and the Caucasus. In May 2013, the New South Wales parliament formally recognised the Assyrian genocide. Assyrians have been labelled as a successful minority group, and have established many churches, schools and community centres.

=== New Zealand ===
- 1991 census: 315
- 1996 census: 807
- 2001 census: 1,176
  - 465 in the Auckland region
  - 690 in the Wellington region
  - Highest unemployment rate (40 percent)
  - Highest-percentage-Christian ethnic group (99 percent)
  - English spoken: 774; no English: 348. Number of languages spoken: 1: 225; 2: 405; 3: 423; 4: 63; 5: 3
- 2006 census: 1,683

== See also ==
- Assyrian continuity
- Assyrian culture
- Assyrian homeland
- Assyrian independence movement
- Assyrians in Israel
- Eastern Aramaic languages
- History of Mesopotamia
- Name of Syria
- Refugees of Iraq
- Terms for Syriac Christians
