= Assyrian culture =

Cultural traditions of contemporary Assyrians

Assyrian culture is not only distinct in that it is different from the neighboring ethnic groups of the Assyrian homeland, but that many of its unique traits trace back to their ancient heritage in Mesopotamia. Many Assyrians (estimates of fluent speakers range from 500,000) still speak, read and write various Akkadian-influenced dialects of Eastern Aramaic, labelled by linguists as Northeastern Neo-Aramaic and Central Neo-Aramaic.

A defining trait of modern Assyrian culture is the predominance of several denominations of Syriac Christianity, notably the Ancient Church of the East, the Assyrian Church of the East, the Chaldean Catholic Church, the Syriac Catholic Church and the Syriac Orthodox Church, as well as other churches.

== Annual celebrations ==
Assyrians celebrate many different kinds of traditions within their communities, with the majority of Assyrian traditions being tied to Christianity. A number include feast days (Syriac: hareh) for different patron saints, the Rogation of the Ninevites (Syriac: ܒܥܘܬܐ ܕܢܝܢܘܝ̈ܐ, romanized: Baʿuṯa d-Ninwaye), Ascension Day (Kalo d-Sulaqa), Hano Qritho (Syriac: ܚܢܘ ܩܪܝܬܐ) and the most popular, the Kha b-Nisan (Syriac: ܚܕ ܒܢܝܣܢ, lit. '"First of April"'). Some of these traditions have been practised by the Assyrians for well over 1,500 years.

=== Assyrian Martyr's Day ===
A stylised Ṭabbakh (ܛܒܚ, 'August') in Syriac with the number 7 is often the symbol marking Martyrs Day.

The Simele massacre (ܦܪܡܬܐ ܕܣܡܠܐ, Pramta d-Simmele) was the first of many massacres committed by the Iraqi government during the systematic targeting of the Assyrians of northern Iraq in August 1933. The killing spree that continued among 63 Assyrian villages in the Dohuk and Nineveh districts led to the deaths of an estimated 3,000 Assyrians.

August 7 became known as Martyrs Day (ܝܘܡܐ ܕܣܗܕ̈ܐ, Yawma d-Sahdhe) or National Day of Mourning by the Assyrian community in memory of the Simele massacre as it was declared by the Assyrian Universal Alliance in 1970. In 2004, the Syrian government banned the Assyrian political organization and the Assyrian community of Syria from commemorating the event, and threatened arrests if any were to break the ban.

=== Resha d-Nisan ('Start of Spring' or 'Assyrian New Year') ===
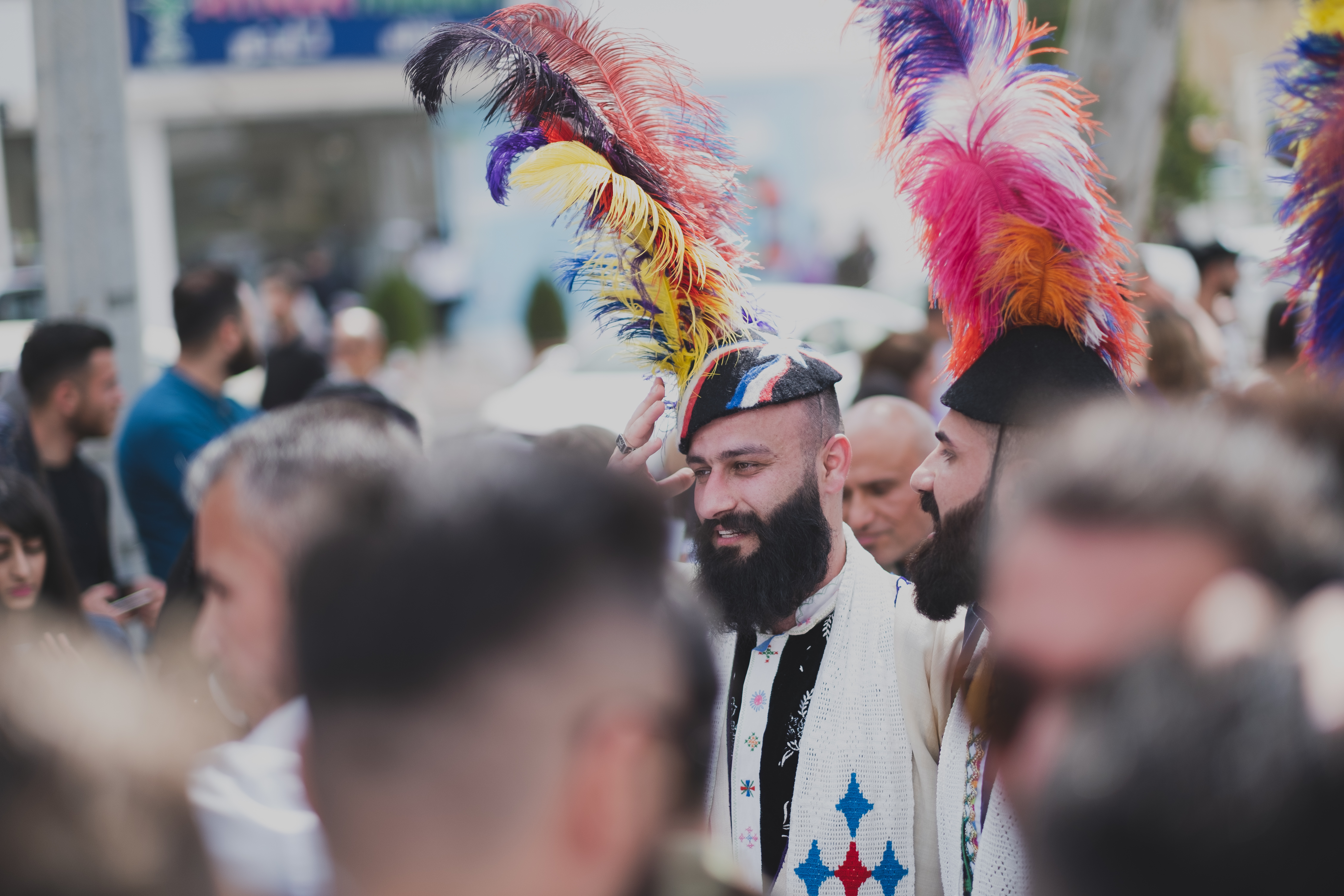
The Assyrian New Year, Akitu festival (2019) in Duhok (Nohaadra)

The Assyrian new year festival, known as Resha d-Nisan (literally 'Head of April'), is celebrated on the first day of spring and continues for 12 days.

Celebrations involve holding parades and parties, gathering in clubs and social institutions and listening to poets reciting "the Story of Creation." The men and women wear traditional clothes and dance in parks for hours.

After the formation of the Turkish state in the 1920s, Resha d-Nisan along with the Kurdish Nowruz were banned from being celebrated in public. Assyrians in Turkey were first allowed to publicly celebrate Resha d-Nisan in 2006, after organisers received permission from the government to stage the event, in light of democratic reforms adopted in support of Turkey's EU membership bid.

=== Kalo d-Sulaqa ('Bride of the Ascension') ===
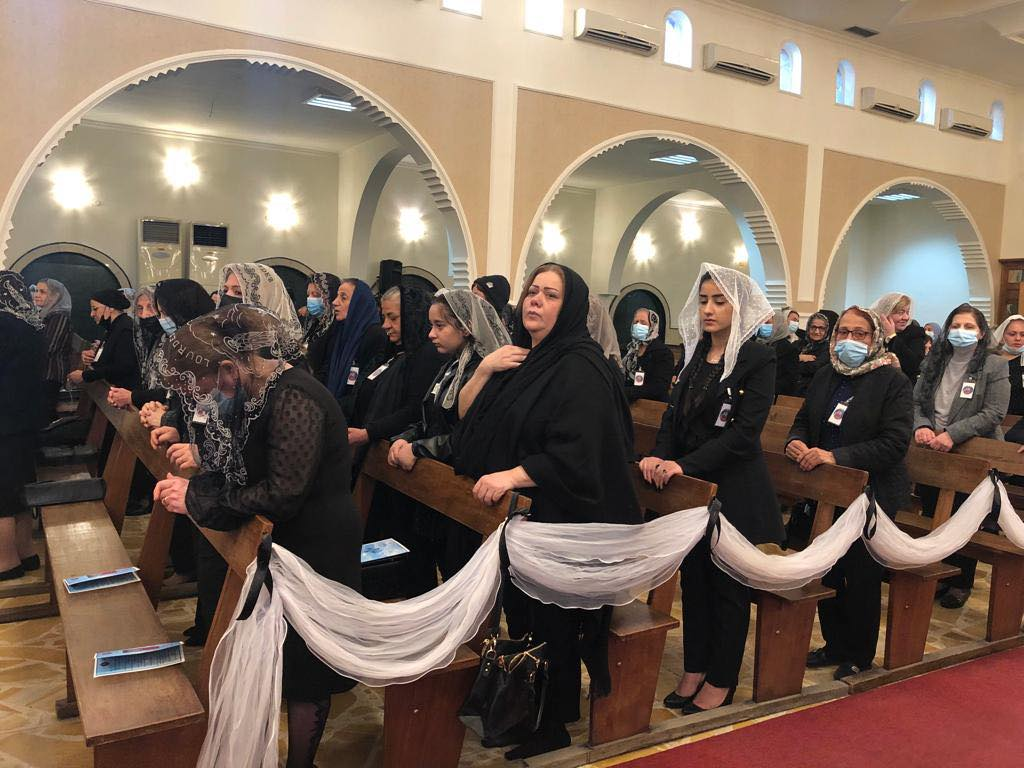
Chaldean Catholics praying in a Holy Qurbana in Baghdad, Iraq.

The legend of Kalo d-Sulaqa tells of a young Malik Shalita, governor of the Assyrian homeland's capital Mosul, who was first noticed by Tamerlane after he had successfully fought and defeated his initial attack on the city. The battle is then described as freedom fighters, both Christian and Muslim, defended against the Mongol attack.

It was during this time that, according to legend, Malik Shalita's wife organised Assyrian women dressed in white, and was given the responsibility to collect provisions from the nearby towns in order to feed the men fighting at the front. Having heard the fate that had befallen their countrymen in Tikrit and Mardin, they knew very well the fate in store for them if they were to lose this battle. Instead of running and hiding, the women prepared for the battle and joined the ranks of the defenders against unfavourable odds.

The historical account is in keeping with the legend, as both describe a brutal battle of attrition, in which both men and women joined and defended themselves against Tamerlane's attack. Malik Shalita and his wife—according to the legend dressed in white—are recorded as having been killed in this battle.

The Assyrian historian Arsanous states that the young boys and girls represent the dead young men and women who ascended to heaven because they died for the cause of Christianity and in defence of their homeland. The tragic nature of the 1401 event had left such an indelible impression on the minds of the survivors that they remembered the final battle and have honoured the memory of the fallen by re-enacting the camaraderie of the Assyrian men and women who died defending their homeland. However, those who managed to survive the massacres also in Baghdad were forced to flee into the Zagros Mountains.

There are many traditional practises that Assyrians observe when celebrating Kalo d-Sulaqa (Ascension Day). Most commonly, in Hakkari, prior to the First World War, girls in each village would gather and choose the prettiest one among them to be the Kalo d-Sulaqa ('the Bride of the Ascension') for that year. She would be dressed in a traditional Assyrian wedding costume and then paraded around the village singing and asking for walnuts and raisins, which they would then share amongst themselves in a feast held afterwards in honour of the 'bride.'

Assyrians would celebrate this day like any other feast, with music, dancing, food and drink, but also with a few differences. Apart from the little girls dressed as brides, there was also a custom practised by Assyrians living in Hakkari, where ropes were tied to strong branches of large trees. After this was done, all those present would attempt to climb one, and any not doing so would mean bad luck for them, while anyone reaching the end of the rope and the branch would have the best of luck for the coming year. This was done to represent the Ascension of Jesus and the eventual resurrection of the dead and final judgement. This custom is seldom practised today apart from certain areas in the northernmost extremities of Iraq.

In Urmi, on the other hand, it was customary for the little girls in the villages to dress as brides and when doing their rounds of their villages would also ask for pennies or trinkets. This is a reflection of the generally greater wealth of the Assyrians in the plains of that region.

It is also said that the very same custom was used during fierce battles. Young girls, dressed as brides, were ordered to take provisions to the men fighting on the battlefield. Their mothers, knowing that they may never return, used this custom to instill courage in their young daughters.

In Syria, young girls and boys would join and form a couple, dressed as bride and groom, and then go from door to door, singing. They were usually rewarded, not with money or candy, but with wheat, rice, fruits, and so on. At the end of the day, the children would go out to a field to cook and eat what they had collected.

This custom, particular to members of the Church of the East and the Chaldean Catholic Church, survives in these communities worldwide and is marked by a party, often women only. It is also a new custom to hold a mock wedding reception complete with khigga, slow dance, dinner, and cake, the only difference being that the bride, groom, best man and maid of honour are all young girls.

=== Baʿuṯa d-Ninwaye ('Fast of Nineveh') ===
The Fast of Nineveh (ܒܥܘܬܐ ܕܢܝܢܘܝ̈ܐ, Baʿuṯa d-Ninwaye, literally 'Rogation of the Ninevites') is a three-day celebration that is composed of prayers and fasting that Assyrians of the Ancient Church of the East, the Assyrian Church of the East, the Chaldean Catholic Church, the Syriac Orthodox Church and the Syriac Catholic Church (as well as The Malankara Orthodox Syrian Church and Syro-Malankara Catholic Church in India) consider sacred. The word baʿuṯa (ܒܥܘܬܐ) is a Syriac word for 'pleading,' and from this meaning we receive the title of this commemoration.

This annual observance occurs exactly three weeks before the start of Lent. This tradition has been practised by the Syriac Christians since the 6th century.

According to legend, in the 6th century, a plague inflicted the Nineveh Plains (in modern-day northern Iraq). The plague was devastating the city and the villages surrounding it, and out of desperation the people ran to their bishop to find a solution. The bishop sought help through the scriptures and came upon the story of Jonah in the Old Testament.

In the Old Testament, God sent the prophet Jonah to warn the city of Nineveh of great destruction unless they repent for their sins: "the word of the Lord came to Jonah the son of Amathi, saying: Arise and go to Nineveh, the great city, and preach in it: for the wickedness thereof is come up before me." Jonah did not wish for Nineveh to be saved since they (the people of Nineveh) were the enemies of Israel and preferred Nineveh to be destroyed. Instead of listening to God, Jonah fled to Tarshish, across the Mediterranean Sea. During his voyage, a violent storm occurred. The other sailors feared the boat would be completely destroyed and kill everyone if they did not get rid of Jonah, so they decided to throw Jonah overboard. As soon as Jonah hit the water, a giant fish swallowed Jonah whole. Jonah found himself in the dark stomach of the fish. Jonah began to pray earnestly for God to save him and, for three days and nights, Jonah prayed and asked for forgiveness for his disobedience.

On the third night the fish became violently ill and swam near to the seashore where it vomited Jonah onto the beach. Jonah, thankful that he had been spared, started on the journey to Nineveh. Reaching the walls of Nineveh, he began preaching to people as he walked through its streets, "In forty days God will destroy this city because of your great sins." The king of Assyria became disturbed at the message that Jonah preached. He called his people together and commanded them to wear sackcloth clothing and to let neither man nor animals eat as the people prayed and repented of their wicked ways. All of the people of the city cried and prayed and asked God to forgive them for their sins. The city then was not destroyed.

To this day, Assyrians of all three denominations—Catholic, Orthodox and Church of the East—still observe the fast for three days each year. Additionally, this fast has, in recent years, been adopted by sister churches to the Syriac Orthodox Church of the Oriental Orthodox communion, namely the Coptic, Armenian, Malankara, and Ethiopian Orthodox Churches.

== Marriage rituals ==
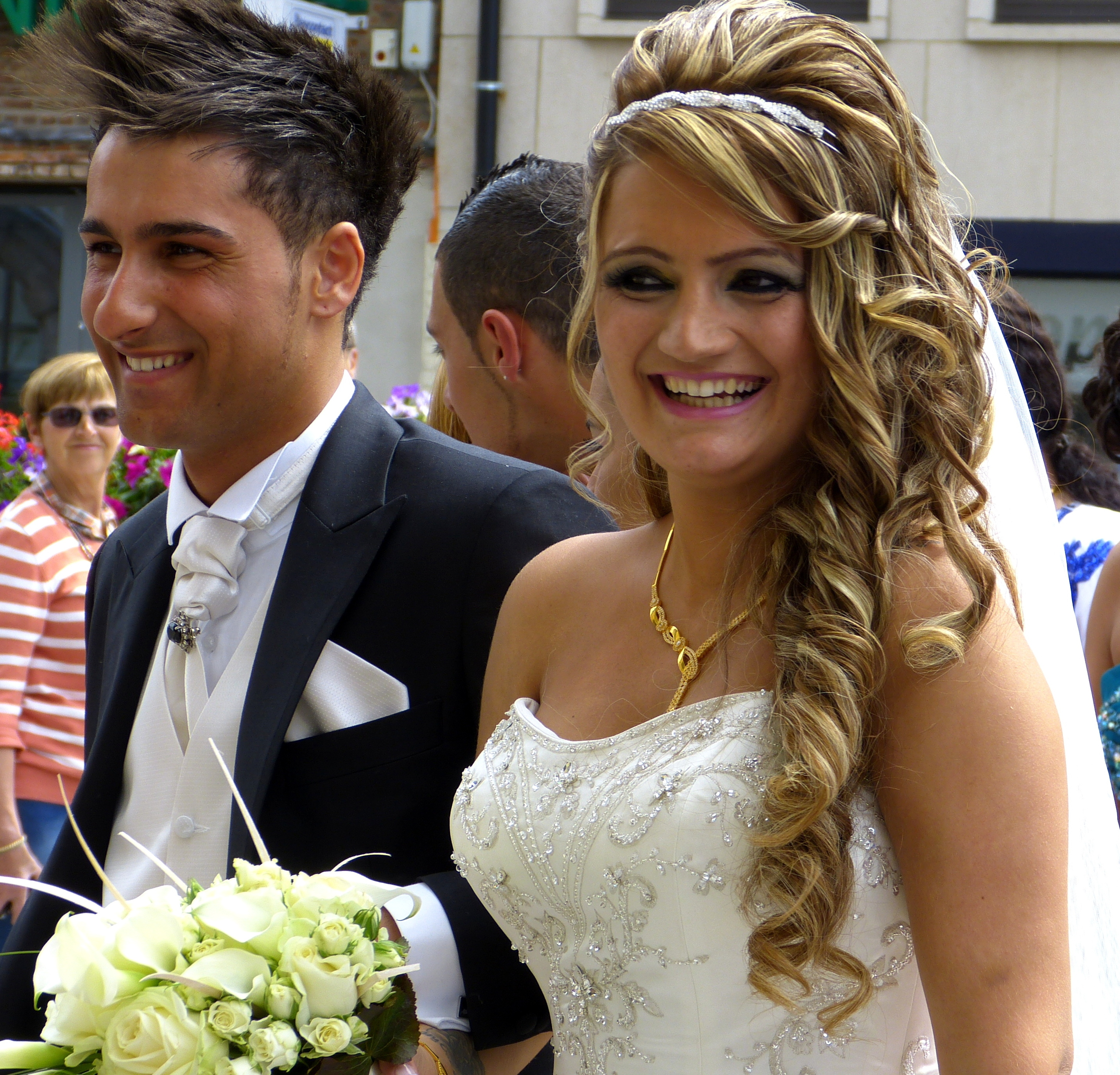
Assyrian wedding in Belgium, 2012

Assyrians have various marriage rituals that are often practiced traditionally and have carried over to diaspora communities. Some examples of traditions include the 'Showering of the groom' (Syriac: ܚܸܒ݂ܛܵܐ ܕܚܸܬܢܵܐ, romanized: Khypta d’ketna) and the Burakha (Syriac: ܒܘܼܪܵܟ݂ܵܐ). Assyrian weddings are typically massive events that not only express the marriage of a new couple, but act as a way to express Assyrian identity within a communal space.

== Funeral rituals ==
=== Traditional ===
The burial rituals of the Assyrians is described by Surma D'Bait Mar Shimun and the manner by which Assyrians of the highland cared for their dead relatives resemble what Olmsted wrote about how the ancient Assyrian cared for theirs. Surma wrote: "In some districts—as in Tkhuma for instance—food is also placed on the graves and in this valley the graves are often made with a little niche in the side of them both for this purpose and for the putting of the light." About the burial customs of the ancient Assyrians, Olmsted writes: "always the lamp was left in a niche, and even the smoke can still be seen. A large water jar, a jug, and several dishes formed the remainder of the equipment needed for the after-life ..." Surma further adds; On the morning of the resurrection day before day light Assyrians in the highland visited the graves of their loved ones and lighted tapers on their resting site. The usual greeting at this time was "light to your departed".

=== Contemporary ===
In the modern tradition, the mourning family host guests in an open house-style just after a loved one passes away. Only bitter coffee and tea are served, showcasing the sorrowful state of the family. Symbolically, some will not drink the coffee in front of them at all. On the funeral day, a memorial mass is held in the church. At the graveyard, the people gather and burn incense around the grave as clergy chant hymns in the Syriac language. The closest female relatives traditionally bewail or lament (bilyaya) in a public display of grief, with some beating their chest, as the casket descends. Other women may sing a dirge or a sentimental threnody (jnana, which are short, rhymed chants) to passionately heighten the mood of the mourning at the cemetery, similar to an Indian oppari. Zurna and dola may be played if the departed is a young, unmarried male.

During all these occasions, everyone is expected to dress in complete black, passively informing the community that they have recently buried a loved one. Following the burial, everyone would return to the church hall for afternoon lunch and eulogy. At the hall, the closest relatives sit on a long table facing the guests (akin to a bridegroom's table at a wedding) as many people walk by before leaving shaking hands, offering their condolences. At the hall, dates and halva may served to offer some "sweetness" in the bitter grieving period. On the third day, mourners would customarily visit the grave site with a pastor to burn incense, symbolising Jesus' triumph over death on the third day, and 40 days after the funeral (representing Jesus ascending to heaven), and in conclusion one year to the date. Mourners also wear only black until the 40 day mark, with no jewellery and would typically not dance or celebrate any major events for one year.

== Assyrian cuisine ==
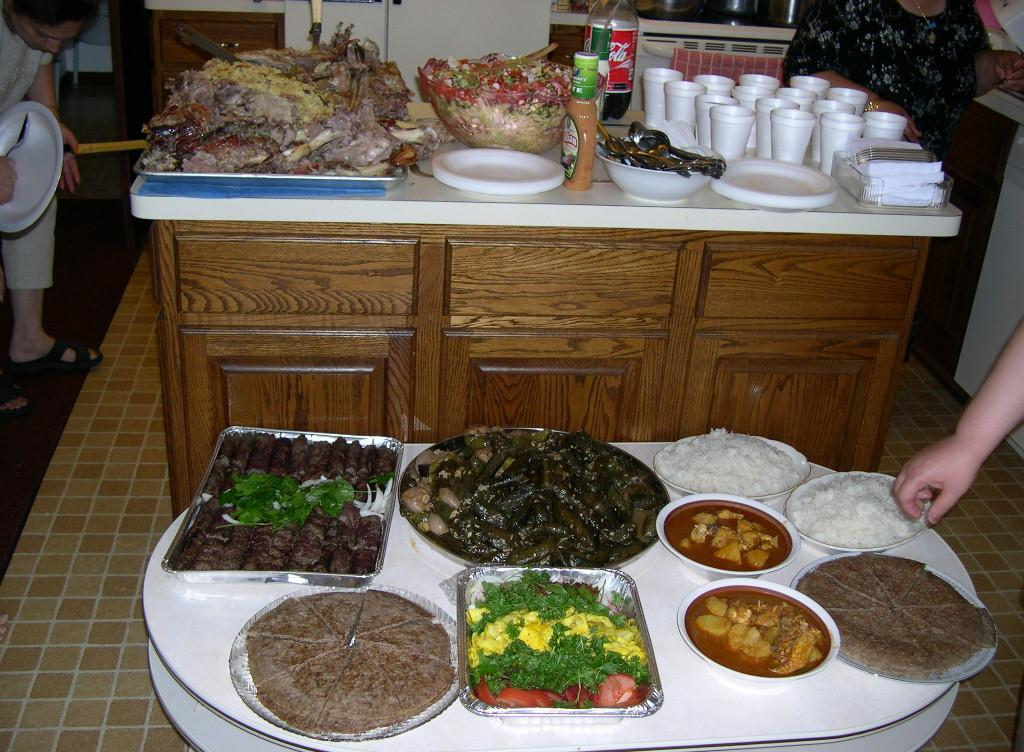
Typical Assyrian cuisine

Assyrian cuisine is primarily identical to Iraqi/Mesopotamian cuisine, as well as being very similar to other Middle Eastern and Caucasian cuisines, as well as Greek cuisine, Levantine cuisine, Turkish cuisine, Iranian cuisine, Israeli cuisine, and Armenian cuisine, with most dishes being similar to the cuisines of the area in which those Assyrians live/originate from. It is rich in grains such as barley, meat, tomato, herbs, spices, cheese, and potato as well as fermented dairy products and pickles.

== See also ==
- Christian culture
