= Minorities in Iraq =

Minorities in Iraq have been incredibly influential to the history of the country, and consist of various ethnic and religious groups. The largest minority group in Iraq is the Kurds, with Turkmen following shortly after. Prior to the 2003 invasion of Iraq, Assyrians constituted a sizeable population of 1.5 million, and belonged to various different churches such as the Assyrian Church of the East, Chaldean Catholic Church, and the Syriac Orthodox/Catholic Churches. Other minority groups in Iraq include Armenians, Mandaeans, Baháʼís, and Marsh Arabs, among others.

== Kurds ==
Flag of the Kurdistan Regional Government of Iraq

Approximate map of the Kurdish-populated region of Iraq

The vast majority of Iraqi Kurds are Sunni Muslims, with Shia and Christian minorities.

Under the Kingdom of Iraq, Kurdish leader Mustafa Barzani led a rebellion against the central government in Baghdad in 1945. After the failure of the uprising Barzānī and his followers fled to the Soviet Union. In the 1960s, when Iraqi Brigadier Abdul-Karim Qassem distanced himself from Egyptian president Gamal Abdel Nasser, he faced growing opposition from pro-Egypt officers in the Iraqi army. When the garrison in Mosul rebelled against Qassem's policies, he allowed Barzānī to return from exile to help suppress the pro-Nasser rebels. By 1961, Barzānī and the Kurds began a full-scale rebellion.

When the Ba'ath Party took power in Iraq, the new government, in order to end the Kurdish revolt, granted the Kurds their own limited autonomy. However, for various reasons, including the pro-Iranian sympathies of some Kurds during the Iran–Iraq War in the 1980s, the regime implemented anti-Kurdish policies and a de facto civil war broke out. From March 29, 1987, until April 23, 1989, the infamous Al-Anfal campaign, a systematic genocide of the Kurdish people in Iraq, was launched. For this, Iraq was widely condemned by the international community, but was never seriously punished for oppressive measures, including the use of chemical weapons against the Kurds, which resulted in thousands of deaths.

After the Gulf War, the Kurds began another uprising against the Ba'athists and established the autonomous Kurdistan Region in northern Iraq, which was never recognized by the Iraqi government until 2005. During the same year, Turkey, fighting Kurds on its on territory, bombed Kurdish areas in Northern Iraq, claiming that bases for the terrorist Kurdistan Workers Party were located in the region. However, the 2003 invasion of Iraq and the fall of Saddam, brought renewed hope to the Kurds. The Kurds have since been working towards developing the area and pushing for democracy in the country. However, most Kurds overwhelmingly favor becoming an independent nation. "In the January 2005 Iraqi elections, 98.7 percent of Kurds voted for full independence rather than reconciliation with Iraq." Almost no other political or social group in the region is agreeable to the idea of Kurdish independence. Iraq's neighboring countries such as Turkey are particularly opposed to the movement because they fear that an independent Iraqi Kurdistan would strengthen Kurdish independence movements in their own territories.

Nouri al-Maliki was at loggerheads with the leader of ethnic Kurds, who brandished the threat of secession in a growing row over the symbolic issue of flying the Iraqi national flag at government buildings in the autonomous Kurdish north. Maliki's Arab Shi'ite-led government was locked in a dispute with the autonomous Kurdish regional government, which has banned the use of the Iraqi state flag on public buildings. The prime minister issued a blunt statement on Sunday saying: "The Iraqi flag is the only flag that should be raised over any square inch of Iraq." But Mesud Barzani, president of the Iraqi Kurdistan region, told the Kurdish parliament the national leadership were "failures" and that the Iraqi flag was a symbol of his people's past oppression by Baghdad: "If at any moment we, the Kurdish people and parliament, consider that it is in our interests to declare independence, we will do so and we will fear no one." The dispute exposes a widening rift between Arabs and Kurds, the second great threat to Iraq's survival as a state after the growing sectarian conflict between Arab Sunnis and Shi'ites.

=== Shabaks ===
Although their origins are uncertain, Shabaks are considered to be of Kurdish ethnicity by some scholars, and form an estimated population of 200–500,000 as of 2017. Many Shabaks in Iraq are concentrated in the Nineveh Plains and areas such as Mosul and the Assyrian village of Bartella. They are an ethnic and religious minority, retaining their own distinct pre-Islamic religion, though many consider themselves to be Shia Muslims.

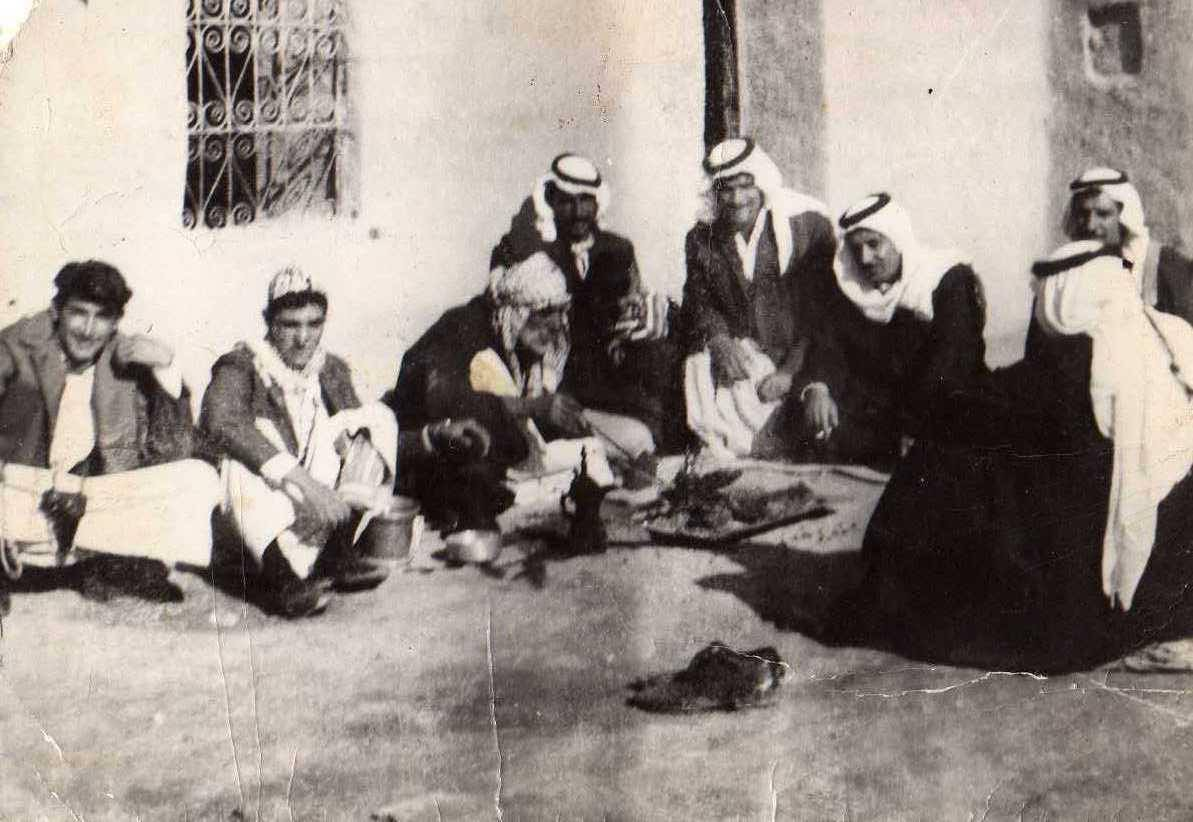
A group of Shabaks in Iraq

Shabaks have their own distinct language, Shabaki, that combines elements of Turkish and Arabic. However, many Shabaks fear that the language will be lost due to human-rights violations against them by ISIS. The Shabak are represented in the Iraqi parliament and have a militia registered under the Popular Mobilization Forces known as the Shabak Brigade.

=== Yazidis ===
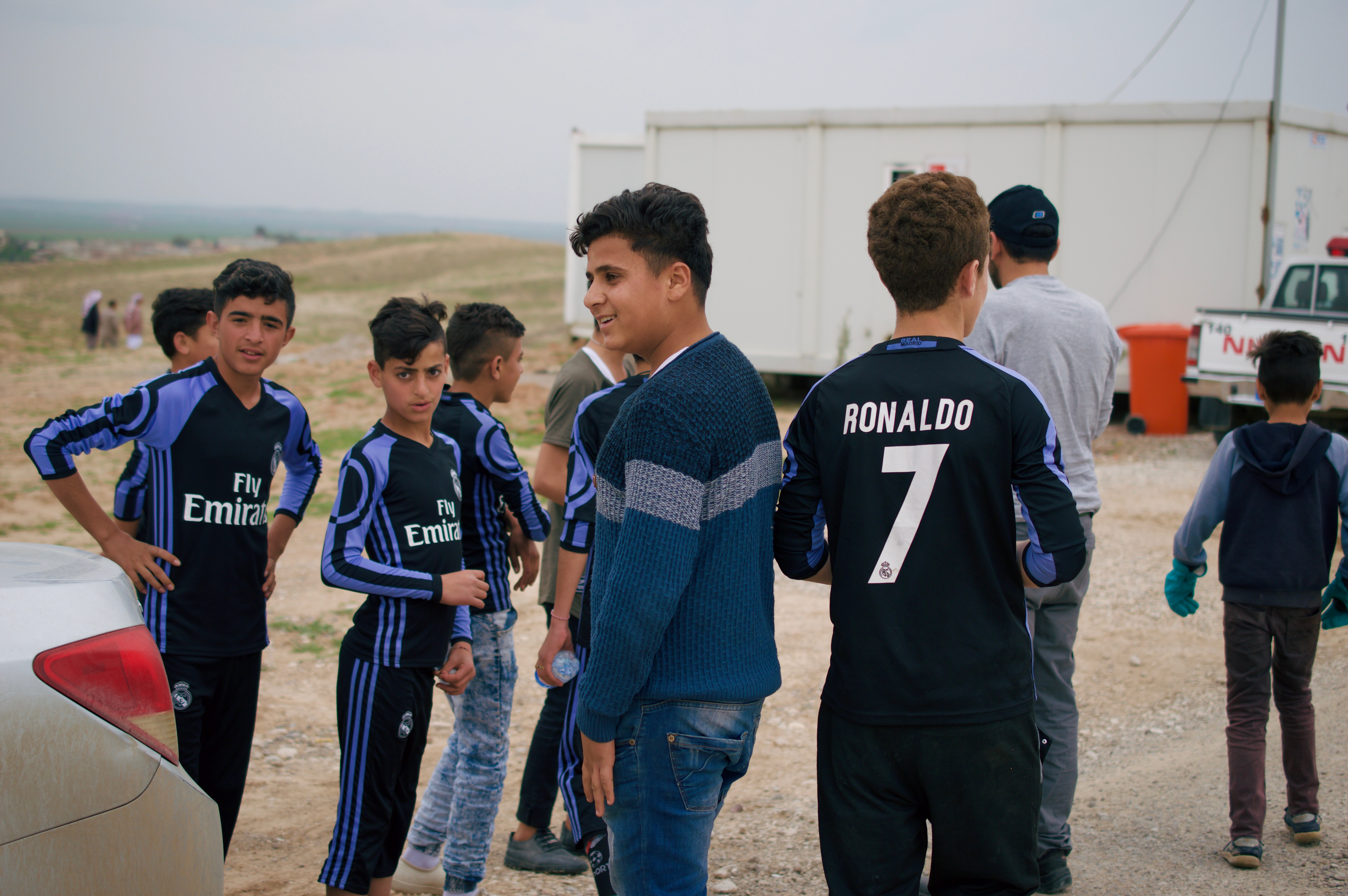
Yezidi children in an IDP camp in Dohuk

Today, there are around 650,000 Yazidis in Iraq, who primarily live in the northern areas of the country. They primarily speak Kurdish with the exception of the two villages Bashiqa and Bahzani, located near Mosul. Amongst scholars and Yazidi social circles, there is continuous debate over the identity of Yazidis and whether or not they are ethnically Kurdish or a separate group of people. Yazidism has roots in a western Pre-Zoroastrian religion, and is based in the belief that the world was created by God to be entrusted in the care of seven angels.

=== Feylis ===
The Feylis are an ethnographic group of Shia Muslim Kurds who follows the Ja'fari school. The Feylis are indigenous to Elam, Lorestan, and Kirmanshah, the region between Iraq and Iran, they live in the central and northeastern parts of Iraq. There are also a big Feyli community in Baghdad, many of whom come from well known aristocratic families, who originally migrated from Persia during the 1600 and 1700s. Their population is estimated to be around 1,500,000 to 2,500,000 in Iraq which is about 30% of the Iraqi Kurdish population. They are known for being very wealthy businessmen, bankers, merchants, politicians, senators, highly educated and dominated the politics and economy of Iraq especially during the 30s until the 70s. Unlike the other sunni Kurds the Feylis speak the southern Kurdish dialect. In the mid-1970s, the Iraqi government launched a campaign of forced deportation and exile targeting the Feyli Kurds. In 1970, more than 70,000 Feylis were deported to Iran and their citizenship was revoked, alleging that they were Iranian nationals. On 7 May 1980, Saddam Hussein signed decree number 666 which legalized and ordered the confiscation, forced deportation, exile and detention of Feyli Kurds. Saddam justified the decree by accusing Feyli Kurds of having "foreign origin" and "disloyalty to the people and father land and to the political and social principles of the Revolution", deporting over 700 000 Feylis to Iran. However, since 2003 many Feyli Kurds have returned to Iraq and been granted Iraqi citizenship.

== Turkmen ==
Flag of the Iraqi Turkmen

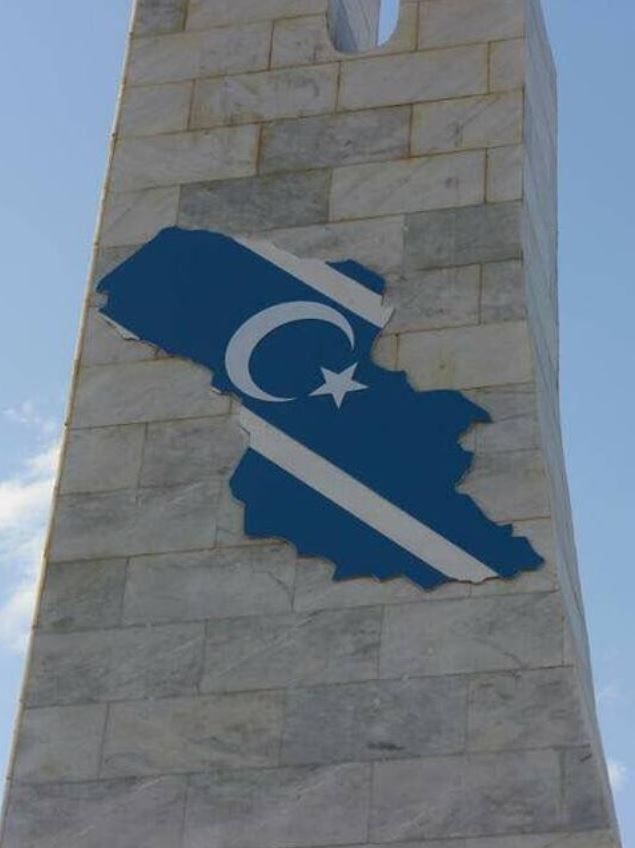
A map of Turkmeneli on a monument in Altun Kupri (Turkish: Altınköprü).

The Iraqi Turkmen are the third largest ethnic group in the country, after the Arabs and Kurds. They are a branch of the Turkic peoples and adhere to that heritage and identity, this is because most Iraqi Turkmen/Turkoman are the descendants of the Ottoman soldiers, traders and civil servants who were brought into Iraq from Anatolia during the rule of the Ottoman Empire. Since the demise of the Ottoman Empire, the Iraqi Turkmen/Turkoman have found themselves increasingly discriminated against from the policies of successive regimes, such as the Kirkuk Massacre of 1923, 1947, 1959, and in 1979 when the Ba'ath Party discriminated against the community. Although the Turks were recognized as a constitutive entity of Iraq (alongside the Arabs and Kurds) in the constitution of 1925, the Iraqi Turkmen/Turkoman were later denied this status.

According to the 1957 Iraqi census the Turkmen/Turkoman had a population of 567,000, accounting for 9% of the total Iraqi population. By 2013, the Iraqi Ministry of Planning said that there were 3 million Turkmen/Turkoman, out of a population of 34.7 million, forming 8.65% of the population. The Turkmen/Turkoman minority mainly reside in northern and central Iraq, in the so-called Turkmeneli region – which is a political term used by the Turkmen/Turkoman to define the vast swath of territory in which they have historically had a dominant population. In particular, the Turkmen/Turkoman consider the capital of Turkmeneli to be Kirkuk and its boundaries also include Tal Afar, Mosul, Erbil, Mandali, and Tuz Khurmatu. According to Liam Anderson and Gareth Stansfield, the Turkmen/Turkoman note that the term "Turcomania" – an Anglicized version of "Turkmeneli" – appears on a map of the region published by William Guthrie in 1785, however, there is no clear reference to Turkmeneli until the end of the twentieth century. According to Khalil Osman there has been "a raft of federalist schemes" proposed by various Turkmen/Turkoman political parties.

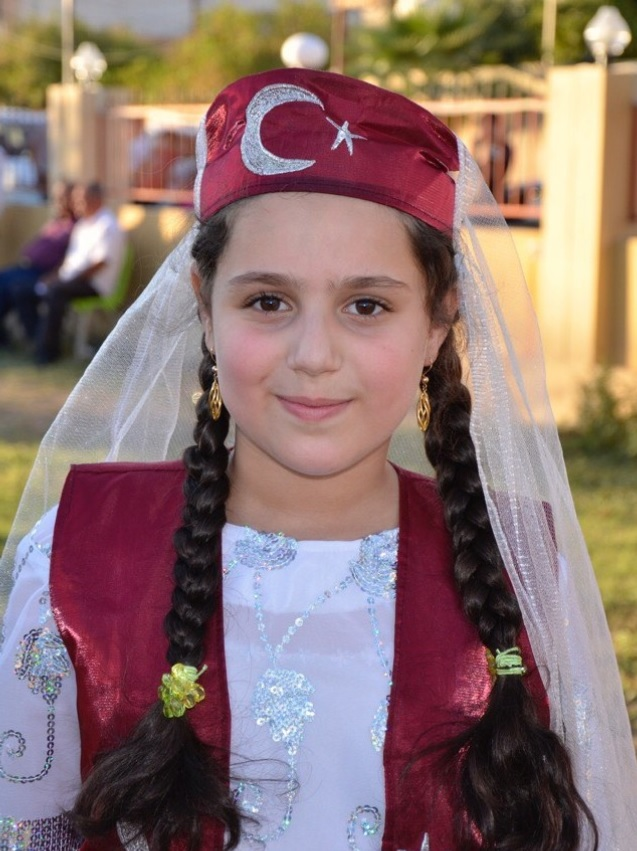
Iraqi Turkmen girl in traditional Turkish costume.

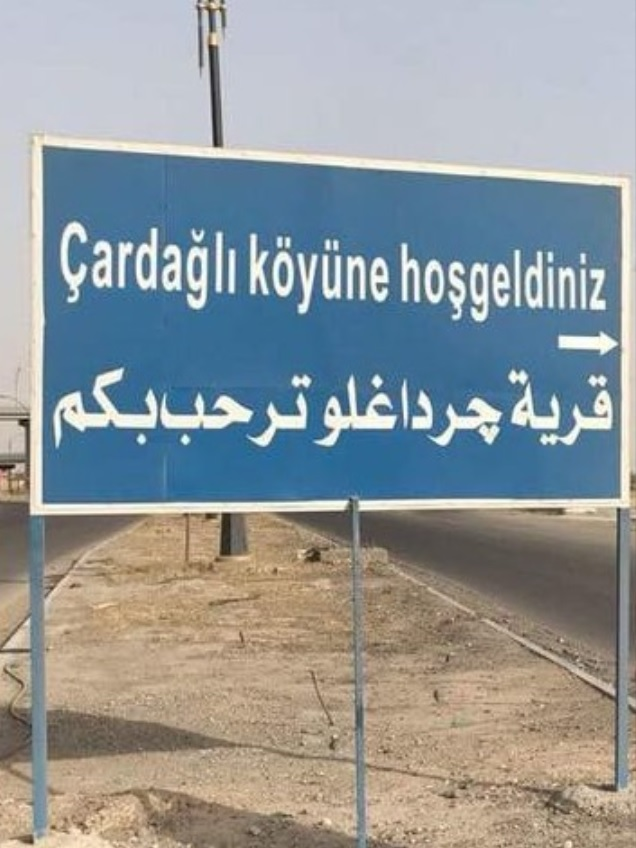
Bilingual sign (Arabic and Turkish) of a Turkmen village.

The Iraqi Turkmen/Turkoman share close cultural and linguistic ties with Turkey, particularly the Anatolian region. They are predominately Muslims, formed of a majority Sunni population (about 60%-70%) but there is also a significant number of Turkmen/Turkoman practicing the Shia branch of Islam (about 30% to 40%). Nonetheless, the Turkmen are mainly secular, having internalized the secularist interpretation practiced in the Republic of Turkey. The minority speak their own dialect of Turkish, which is often called "Turkmen". This dialect was influenced by Ottoman Turkish from 1534 onwards, but also by Persian during the brief capture of Baghdad in 1624; thereafter, in 1640, the Turkish varieties continued to be influenced by Ottoman Turkish, as well as other languages in the region, such as Arabic and Kurdish. Some linguists have suggested that the dialect spoken by Turkmen/Turkoman is similar to the South Azeri dialect used by the Turkish Yörük tribes in the Balkans and Anatolia. However, the Turkmen/Turkoman dialect is particularly close to the Turkish dialects of Diyarbakır and Urfa in south-eastern Turkey and Istanbul Turkish has long been the prestige dialect which has exerted a profound historical influence on their dialect. In addition, the Iraqi Turkmen/Turkoman grammar differs sharply from Irano-Turkic varieties, such as South Azeri and Afshar types. In 1997 the Turkmen/Turkoman adopted the Turkish alphabet as the formal written language and by 2005 the community leaders decided that the Turkish language would replace the Arabic script in Iraqi schools. The current prevalence of satellite television and media exposure from Turkey may have also led to the standardisation of Turkmeni towards Turkish, and the preferable language for adolescents associating with the Turkish culture.

== Assyrians ==
Christianity has a presence in Iraq dating to the 1st century AD, and after Israel, Iraq has the second most rich Biblical history of any country. The Christian community in Iraq is relatively small, and further dwindled due to the Iraq War to just an estimated 150,000 as of 2024. The majority of Christians in Iraq are ethnic Assyrians, who belong traditionally to the Syriac Orthodox Church, Chaldean Catholic Church and the Assyrian Church of the East, and are dispersed across the north of the country, including the Nineveh Plains, Dohuk, and Erbil.

Flag of the Assyrians

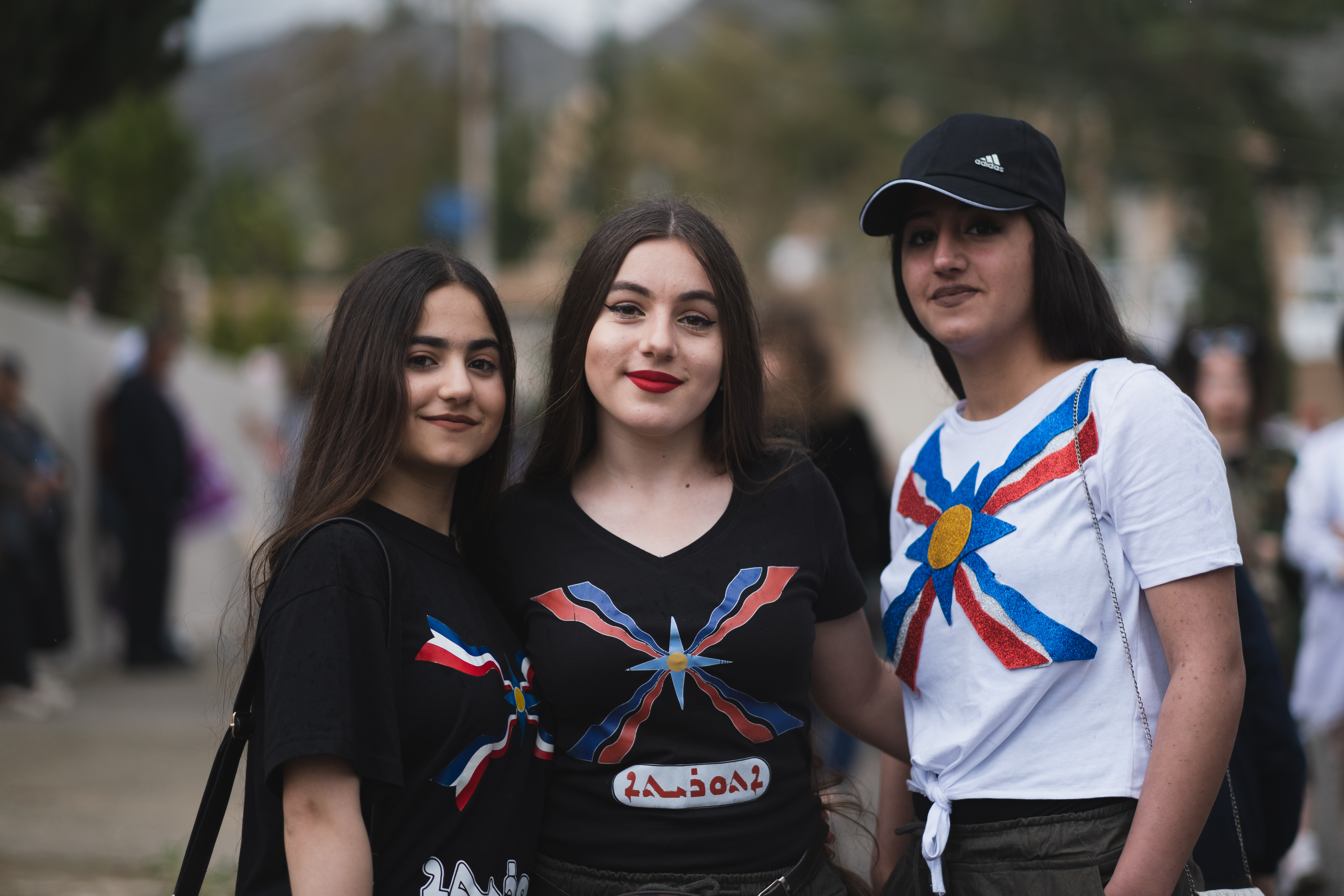
Assyrian women celebrating Akitu in Nohadra

The Neo-Aramaic-speaking Assyrians are one of the indigenous peoples of Iraq and the descendants of those who ruled ancient Akkad, Assyria and Babylonia. More generally speaking, the Assyrians (like the Mandaeans) are the descendants of the ancient Mesopotamians (Sumer, Akkad, Assyria, Babylon, Adiabene, Osroene and Hatra). They began to convert to Christianity in the 1st and 2nd centuries AD, formerly having followed ancient Mesopotamian religion. They are Iraq's fourth largest ethnic group after the Arabs, the Kurds and the Turkmen.

Many of the Assyrians in modern-day Iraq had been part of communities that have existed since ancient times, especially in the Nineveh Plains, but a number of them were settled in the country following the Assyrian genocide. Upon their resettlement in Iraq, as well as due to being religiously Christian, Assyrians were met with continued hostility from the Iraqi government and neighboring Kurdish tribes, believing that they were a product of foreign influence from the British, especially after their recruitment to the Assyrian Levies. This would be the catalyst for the Simele massacre, led by Bakr Sidqi that lasted for several days, with killings and lootings in Assyrian villages. The massacre had drastic consequences for Assyrians in the new state, propelling sectarian divisions through the creation of separate Chaldean and Syriac identities, and acting as a basis for military involvement in Iraqi politics, which has re-emerged as a continuous pattern since 1958. On the former, the Simele massacre highlighted divisions between the Assyrian community in their respective churches, as the Chaldean Catholic Church and Syriac Orthodox Church were believed to have supported the Iraqi army during the massacre under duress.

Although Assyrians experienced a relative period of calm during the Qasimist-era, they continued to come under persecution during Saddam Hussein's Ba'athist regime. When Hussein first assumed power, the Assyrian population there numbered 2 million to 2.5 million. Initially, laws were passed to recognize Assyrians right to use of language and express culture, including the right to use and teach Neo-Aramaic dialects and establish new magazines, associations, and other clubs. Additionally, Hussein appointed Assyrian politicians, namely Tariq Aziz, to high positions in the Ba'ath government. However, the inclusionary law would eventually be revoked and Neo-Aramaic language was banned from use until the 1990s. Under Saddam, persecution of Assyrians continued by evoking sectarian divisions between Chaldean Catholics and Assyrians of the Church of the East. As of result of continuous conflict, including forced conscription in the Iran–Iraq War, forced involvement in the Kurdish rebellion, and persecution for their faith, many fled to neighboring countries such as Jordan and Syria, or emigrated to Europe and the U.S. The United Nations High Commission for Refugees reports that half a million Iraqi Christians have registered for temporary asylum in Syria.

Reports published in the 1990s indicated that greater levels of freedom for Assyrians existed under the authority of the Kurdish Regional Government, however human rights violations continued. Continued mob violence and land-grabbing against Assyrians, as well as prevention of the establishment of Assyrian schools, continued to pull the KRG under scrutiny and condemnation by Assyrian organizations. Although their rights were greater than under the federal government, Assyrians were not met with much better of a situation as noted by international institutions.

After the 2003 invasion of Iraq, the situation for Assyrians drastically worsened. The lack of stability left Assyrians open to violence due to their faith, exacerbating the threat of ethnic cleansing by insurgent groups. Bombings and attacks on churches in 2004, 2010, and 2013 were several instances where Assyrians were attacked for their faith. The deaths of Chaldean Catholic clergymen Ragheed Ganni and Paulos Faraj Rahho are also testaments to the violence that Assyrians faced as Iraq became more sectarian following the deposal of Saddam Hussein. Assyrians felt pressure to convert to Islam or face death, causing most to flee. Mosul was reported as having particularly violent persecution against Assyrians, with reports suggesting that many were stopped and shot if their names indicated Assyrian ancestry or Christian religion. At the same time, the Kurdish Regional Government continued to discriminate against Assyrians, including a mysterious disappearance of Sarkis Aghajan Mamendo after speaking out against the human rights violations of the autonomous region.

The Fall of Mosul and the renewed War in Iraq (2013-2017) due to ISIS was the catalyst for much of the Assyrian exodus from Iraq. After capturing the city, the group issued a decree that Christians would have to pay jizya tax, convert to Islam, or face death, causing a complete exodus of Christians from the city. No mass was held in the city for the first time in 2000 years, and many fled to the suburb of Ankawa, Erbil. Although the city was eventually reclaimed in 2017, Assyrians were slow to return due to several challenges from militia groups, and continuing discrimination in the city. Almost no Assyrians are left in Mosul today, and the population has since dropped to just below 150,000 across the whole of Iraq.

Currently, Assyrians continue to face persecution from the KRG as well as individual Kurds, as attempts of Kurdification in Assyrian villages and cities are condoned by the government. This was after the Kurdish takeover of Assyrian towns in the Kurdistan region (such as Zakho, Ainkawa, Aqrah, etc.) and the forceful deportation and killing of Christians in that area. Federal Iraq continues to remain unstable for many Assyrian communities, as the threat of ISIS is still present and they continue to be met with discrimination and lack of representation in government. The threat of militia groups, particularly the Babylon Brigade (led by ethnic Assyrian Rayan al-Kildani) and the Shabak Brigade, remains and prevents Assyrian demographic returns to villages and political representation through hijacking of political seats in parliament.

Since the invasion of Iraq, many Assyrians have fled abroad and settled in diaspora communities. Many Assyrians from Iraq have settled in Detroit, which has the largest concentration of Assyrians outside of Iraq and is primarily composed of Chaldean Catholics from villages such as Tel Keppe and Alqosh. Chicago also has a sizeable Assyrian community, namely of the Assyrian Church of the East, and both churches have dioceses in Sydney, Australia. Despite the moves outside of Iraq, though, Assyrian diaspora communities have increasing hope for mass Assyrian returns in the future.

== Other groups ==
=== Armenians ===
The Armenians are Orthodox Christians native to the Armenian highlands. Armenians have a long history of association with Mesopotamia, going back to pre-Christian times; however, many Armenians in contemporary Iraq began to settle in the country after the Armenian genocide. Throughout the history of Iraq, Armenians have been a successful community, establishing football clubs and other establishments. Armenian folk music and dance is also admired in Iraqi culture, and Iraqi Armenians, such as Seta Hagopian, were incredibly popular in Iraqi culture. Most Iraqi Armenians live in Baghdad, Mosul, and Basra and their population is estimated at 10,000 down from 70,000 before the 2003 invasion of Iraq.

After the 2003 invasion of Iraq, many Armenians fled to the Kurdistan Region or left the country altogether. The Kurdistan Region Parliament allocates one seat to the Armenian minority, and schools/religious institutions are also established by the community. Three majority Armenian villages, Avzrog, Havresk, and Aghajanian, are also in the Kurdish region.

The Primate of the Armenian Apostolic Church is headquartered in Baghdad, and is led under Avak Asadourian. The Armenian Catholic Church also maintains a presence in Baghdad.

=== Jews ===
Iraq was home to one of the oldest Jewish communities of the Middle East. During the Ottoman period, the Jews were part of society in Iraq. Iraq's first finance minister was Sassoon Eskell, an Iraqi Jew from Baghdad.

Almost all Iraqi Jews were transferred to Israel in the early 1950s in Operation Ezra and Nehemiah and the Israeli bombing. During the time of Abdul-Karim Qasim, the Jews were re-integrated into Iraqi society. Following his overthrow in the 1963 revolution and further coup, the Jewish community faced persecution again. Most of the Jews fled Iraq. Gradually as Saddam Hussein rose to power, the remaining Jews were granted protection and freedom. Between 500 and 1,000 Jews remained in Iraq, across Baghdad, Mosul, Basra and Erbil in Kurdistan. They were not allowed to have jobs in the government and military.

During the oil boom of the 1970s, massive infrastructure projects were proposed by the government. Among them was the construction of a road in Baghdad, where an old Jewish cemetery lies on the route. The cemetery was transferred to another location in the Shi'ite neighborhood of Sadr City, under supervision of the government and Saddam paid the amount for relocation. The Meir Taweig Synagogue in Baghdad continued to function, which was also restored by Saddam. Remaining Jewish sites, some of them also revered by Muslims and Christians were protected by the Ba'ath regime.

=== Mandaeans ===
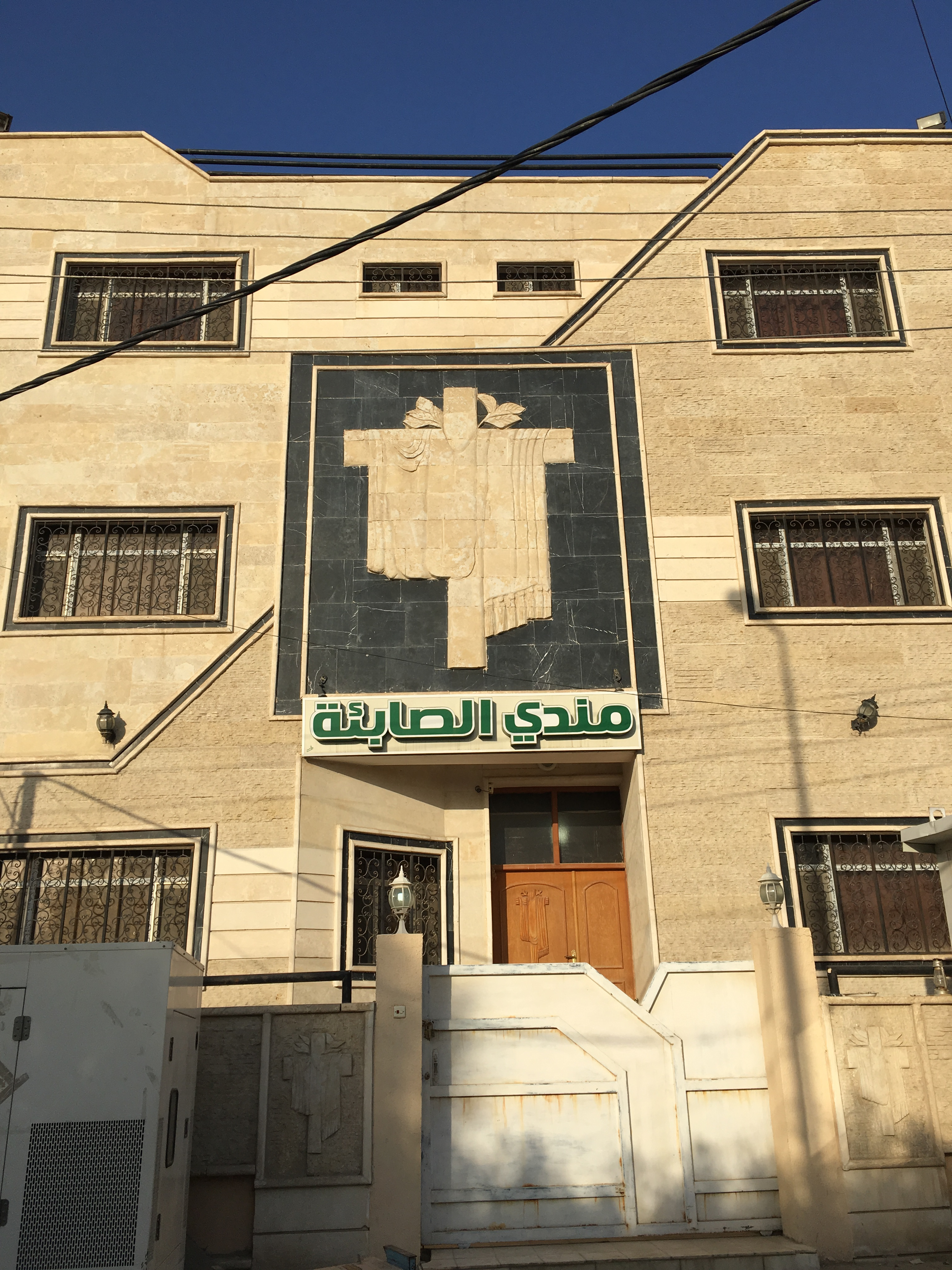
Mandaean Mandi (house of worship) in Nasiriya, southern Iraq -2016

Mandaeans, also known as Sabians (a Quranic epithet historically claimed by several religious groups) and (in Arabic) as Ṣubba, are one of the smallest ethno-religious groups in the world, with only about 75,000 followers worldwide. The oldest independent confirmation of Mandaean existence in the region is Kartir's inscription at Ka'ba-ye Zartosht and there is archaeological evidence that attests to the Mandaean presence in pre-Islamic Iraq. The Mandaeans were originally native speakers of Mandaic, an Eastern Aramaic language, before many switched to colloquial Iraqi Arabic.

The Iraqi Mandaean community, in the pre-1990 Gulf War period, was the most important in the world with 30,000–50,000 of the 70,000 total living in the country mainly in the area around the Tigris and Euphrates rivers. Mandaeans, although an ethnic and religious minority, consider themselves Iraqi and have supported the Iraqi nation patriotically. They gained large protection from the Ba'ath Party against persecution with the Ba'athist regime helping pay for the construction of Mandi's in Iraq, Saddam Hussein even allocated the land owned by the Iraqi ministry of finance to the Mandaeans in the 1980s, granting the Mandaeans a free 1,200 square meters of land, which allowed for the construction of the Sabian–Mandaean Mandi of Baghdad. The Mandaeans were considered an economically successful community, and had achieved high levels in Iraqi society, and are held in high regard as silversmiths, goldsmiths, academics and poets.

=== Marsh Arabs ===
The Marsh Arabs or Ma'dãn are an indigenous group who number 125,000 to 150,000 who live in the Mesopotamian Marshes in southern Iraq.

=== Kaka'is ===
The Kaka'is are a small Kurdish religious group who located mainly in and around Kirkuk in northern Iraq.

=== Roma (Gypsy) ===
Iraq's Roma (Kawliya) ethnic minority was looked down upon as second-class citizens under Ba'ath party rule.

=== Africans ===
The Iraqis of largely African descent live mostly around the city of Basra, having been brought to the region as slaves over one thousand years ago to work the sugarcane plantations then in existence. Although they are Muslims and Arabic-speakers, Afro-Iraqis also retain some cultural and religious traditions from their ancestral homeland. They suffer considerable discrimination due to their race, and, as a result, are restricted to working as entertainers or menial laborers. Moreover, they are often addressed by other Iraqis as 'abd, meaning "slave". In the mid-9th century, black slaves around Basra rose in a rebellion, conquering their former masters and ruling the city for 15 years before being put down by forces sent by the Caliph in Baghdad. After the fall of the Saddam Hussein regime, Afro-Iraqis have once again begun to struggle for an improvement in their condition.

== Assaults on minority Groups since 2003 ==
- August 10, 2009: Truck bombs kill at least 28 people in the Shabak village of Khazna, in Nineveh governorate
- June 20, 2009: Truck bomb kills at least 70 people in a Turkmen village near Kirkuk
- Chaldean Catholic Archbishop Paulos Faraj Rahho was kidnapped on February 23, 2008. Three of his companions were also murdered during the kidnapping. His body was found in March, and an Iraqi Al-Qaeda leader, Ahmed Ali Ahmed, known as Abu Omar, was sentenced to death in May for this crime.
- January 6, 2008: 7 Assyrian churches bombed: three churches in Mosul and four in Baghdad.
- August 14, 2007: Bombing of Qahtaniya and Jazeera - killed 796 people and wounded 1,562, targeting the Yazidi minority.
- June 4, 2007: 2 churches attacked, Ragheed Ganni, a priest, and three men were shot dead in church.
- October 2006: Orthodox priest, Boulos Iskander, kidnapped in Mosul and subsequently beheaded, and his arms and legs were cut off.
- January 2005: Syriac Catholic Archbishop of Mosul, Basile Georges Casmoussa, kidnapped on January 17 and released.
- December 7, 2004: 2 churches bombed.
- October 16, 2004: 5 churches bombed.

== See also ==
- Politics of Iraq
- Demographics of Iraq
- History of Iraq
