= List of Iraqi Armenians =

Iraqi Armenians are people born, raised, or residing in Iraq, with origins in the area known as the Armenian Highlands, which lies between the Caucasus Mountains and Anatolia.

== List ==
=== Arts ===
- Apo Avedissian - filmmaker, painter, photographer, and writer

=== Business ===
- Calouste Gulbenkian - businessman and philanthropist
- Kevork Hovnanian - builder and businessman

=== Literature ===
- Shant Kenderian - writer

=== Music ===
- Seta Hagopian - singer
- Daron Malakian - guitarist and member of the band System of a Down
- Beatrice Ohanessian - pianist

=== Politics ===
- Esabelle Dingizian - politician
- Murad Artin - politician

=== Religion ===
- Torkom Manoogian - Armenian Patriarch of Jerusalem
- Avak Asadourian - Primate of the Armenian Diocese in Iraq

=== Science ===
- Ara Darzi, Baron Darzi of Denham - surgeon and politician
- Robert Istepanian - Professor of m-health

=== Various ===
- Silva Shahakian - beauty contestant

== See also ==
- Armenians in Iraq
- List of Armenians
