= Aram Shahin Davud Bakoyan =

Iraqi-Armenian Member Of Parliament Of The Kurdistan Region

Member of Parliament in the Kurdistan Region
- Incumbent
- Assumed office 2009
- Constituency: Reserved seat for Armenians
- Majority: 4,200 votes

Leader of the Armenian Community in Zakho
- In office 1982–1990

Personal details
- Born: 1954 (age 71–72) Avzrog Miri, Kurdistan Region, Iraq
- Children: Three sons and one daughter
- Profession: Politician, former Peshmerga fighter
- Committees: Municipalities, Housing and Reconstruction

Aram Shahin Davud Bakoyan (born 1954) is a member of parliament in the Kurdistan Region of Iraq. He is of Armenian origin. He was a member of the Kurdish Peshmerga fighters between 1968 and 1974, was then imprisoned and tortured under the Saddam Hussein regime, and after release became a leader of the Armenian community in Zakho. He was elected to the Kurdistan national parliament in 2009.

== Family ==
Bakoyan was born in 1954 in Avzrog Miri, in the north of Kurdistan Region. He is a descendant of the clan Geznakh in Hakkari, today's North Kurdistan (Turkey). He has three sons and one daughter.

== Political career ==
For the 2009 parliamentary elections in Federal Kurdistan Region, eleven of the 111 seats were reserved for minorities, including Assyrians, Turkmen and Armenians. Aram Bakoyan was one of the three Armenian candidates who ran in the election campaign and he was elected. Although there were only about 800 Armenians in Kurdistan who had the right to vote at that time, Aram Bakoyan got 4200 votes. His rivals Aertex Morses Sargisyan and Eshkhan Melkon Sargisyan won respectively 2900 and 880 votes.

One important reason for the Kurdish support for the Armenian candidates and particularly for Aram Bakoyan, is the fact that he was already well known for his Peshmerga (Kurdish freedom fighter) past. In 1968 he and six other Armenians from Zakho joined the Peshmerga, fighting alongside Kurdish members of the KDP against the Baath regime of Saddam Hussein. In 1974 Bakoyan was injured by a cannon blast in the left shoulder and stayed three months in a hospital in Mahabad, in Kurdistan in Iran. His left arm remained immobilised. After coming back home, in 1977 Bakoyan was sentenced to five years in prison for his political activities. In prison Bakoyan was tortured, as were many other Kurdish political prisoners at that time. In 1979 he was released and he continued to participate actively in political and social life. Bakoyan was elected twice as leader of the Armenian community in Zakho in 1982-1990.

Today Aram is member of two committees in the Parliament - the committee for Municipalities and the committee for Housing and Reconstruction. He contributes to the new developments in Kurdistan Region, but he also works to preserve the Armenian cultural heritage and to help the Armenian community.
