= Armenian Brotherhood Church =

Armenian church founded by the survivors of the Armenian Genocide

- Scripture: Bible
- Primate: Council
- Language: Armenian
- Headquarters: Pasadena, California, United States
- Territory: Armenia
- Founder: Survivors of the Armenian genocide
- Independence: 1890s
- Recognition: Armenian Evangelical Church
- Members: 50,000
- Other names: Armenian Evangelical Brotherhood Church; Armenian Brotherhood Bible Church
- Official website: https://abbcpas.org/

The Armenian Brotherhood Church (also known by names such as the Armenian Evangelical Brotherhood Church and the Armenian Brotherhood Bible Church) started within the Armenian Evangelical Church in the 19th century.

The Armenian Apostolic Church gave rise to the Armenian Evangelical Church; similarly the Armenian Brotherhood Church was born out of the Armenian Evangelical Church.

== History ==
In the early twentieth century, a significant number of Armenians from the Cilicia region, as well as Kharput, Marash, Hasan Bay, Antep and Adana aligned themselves with the Brotherhood fellowship. This group, which emerged from the Evangelical Church, initially held unofficial meetings prior to the Armenian genocide which disrupted the group's growth in Cilicia.

Following the genocide, many Armenians people relocated to the Middle East and settled in Iraq, Syria, Lebanon, and Egypt. Europe migrants predominantly settled in Greece and France.

In the nations they settled in some members began meetings, first at homes and later in rented halls, and finally, when the number of the constituency increased and funds allowed, they began to move into church buildings.
