= Armenia–Iraq relations =

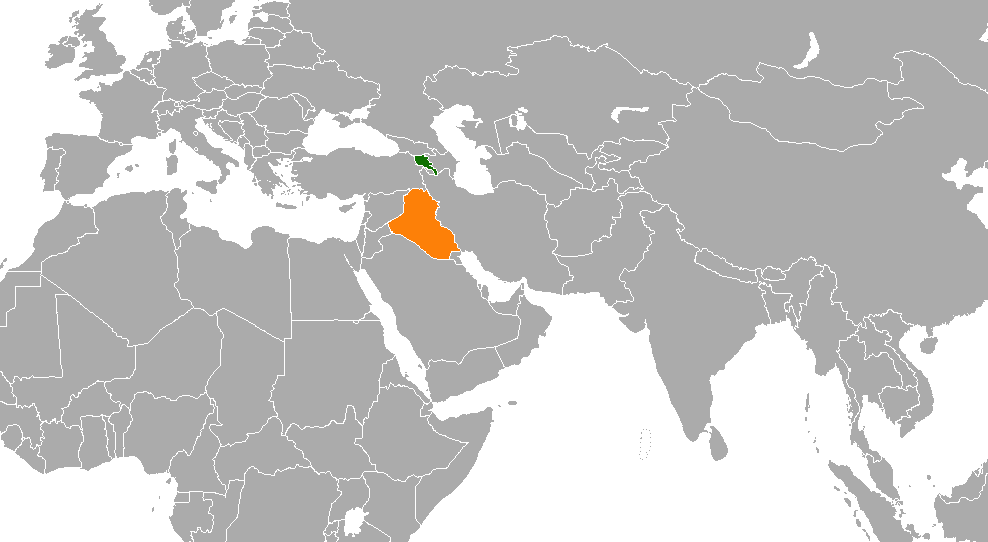

- Armenia: Iraq

Bilateral relations exist between Armenia and Iraq. Armenia has an embassy in Baghdad, and Iraq has an embassy in Yerevan.

== History ==
Armenia and Iraq have a deeply historic relationship, due to ancient connection and proximity. The cultural connection between Armenia and Iraq have been dated during Ancient Armenia and the Sumerians, who inhabited in Mesopotamia. The relations were further expanded when Armenians started to move and inhabit in Mesopotamia, which was contributed to an old and long-existing Armenian community in Iraq, where the community managed to thrive in different eras. The Kingdom of Armenia had extensive relations with Mesopotamian people.

The root of Armenians was thought to be from Mesopotamia, which lies in modern-day Iraq.

When the Armenian genocide occurred, Iraq was part of the Ottoman Empire. Many Armenians had been forcibly deported, expelled and massacred by the Ottoman military, many Armenians found refuge in Iraq and Iraqi Kurdistan. Many local Arabs had given shelters and refuge for Armenians, thus survived from the difficult time. After the conquest of Armenia by the Soviet Union, Armenia's relations with Iraq was switched to the Soviets until 1991.

== Official relations ==
Armenia and Iraq established relations after Armenian declared independence from the Soviet Union in 1992, and Armenia has opened an embassy in Baghdad in 2000 and Iraq opened its counterpart a year later. Armenia itself opposed the Iraq War, but sent troops to assist American mission in the country.

Iraq is one of Armenia's most important trade partners. In 2016, trade between them was over $140 million. Trade in 2016 between Armenia and Iraq had grown 30%.

=== Armenian genocide ===
Sporadic tensions between Iraq and Turkey, the latter is Armenia's arch-foe, have several times caused Iraqi leadership to denounce Turkey and sought to recognize the Armenian genocide.

Leadership of Iraqi Kurdistan had largely condemned the atrocities and apologized on behalf of Kurdish people to the genocide. In 2017, Armenian community in Iraqi Kurdistan saluted referendum and results in Iraqi Kurdistan while also commented about Kurdish support to Armenians during the genocide.

In 2019, Shaykh Yousif Al-Nasri, members of the Supreme Standing Committee for Co-existence and Community Peace of Iraqi Government, as well as the delegation of clergymen, called for recognition of the Armenian genocide.

== Resident diplomatic missions ==
- Armenia has an embassy in Baghdad.
- Iraq has an embassy in Yerevan.
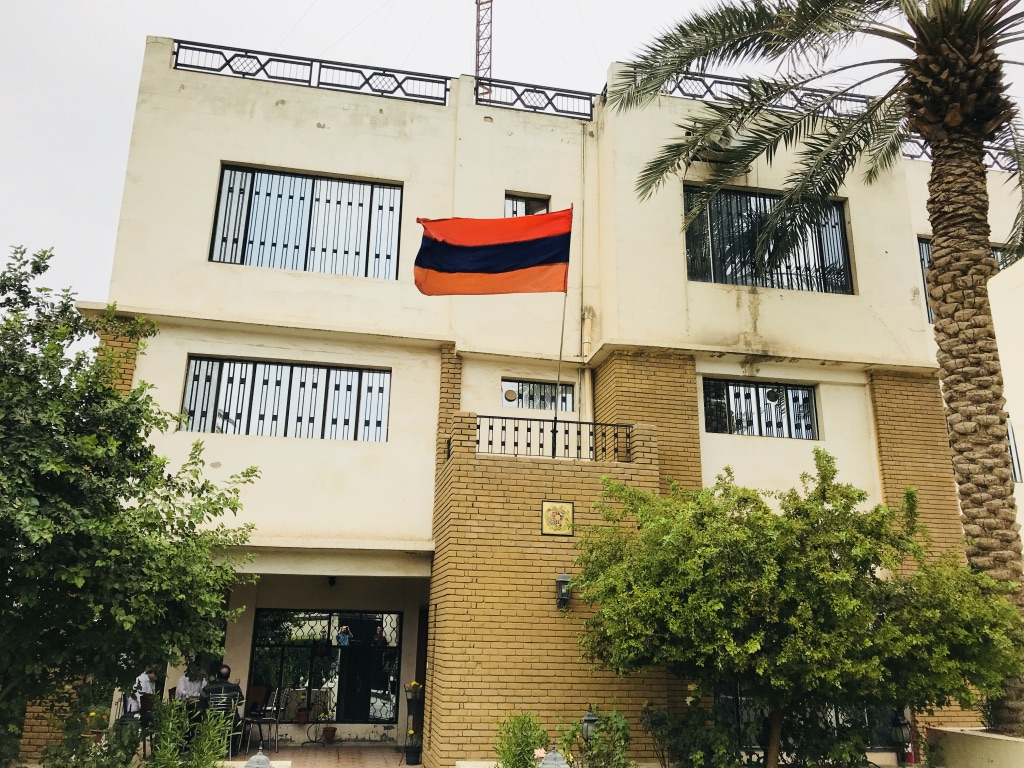
Embassy of Armenia in Baghdad

== See also ==
- Foreign relations of Armenia
- Foreign relations of Iraq
- Embassy of Armenia, Baghdad
- Armenians in Iraq
- Armenians in the Middle East
