= Silva Shahakian =

Iraqi-Armenian beauty pageant contestant

Silva Shahakian (Armenian: Սիլվա Շահակյան; born 1985) is an Iraqi–Armenian beauty pageant titleholder who was crowned Miss Iraq on April 10, 2006. She received the crown because the initial winner, Tamar Goregian, feared retribution from militants.
