= Embassy of Armenia, Baghdad =

Embassy of Armenia in Baghdad سفارة أرمينيا في بغداد Բաղդադում Հայաստանի դեսպանություն
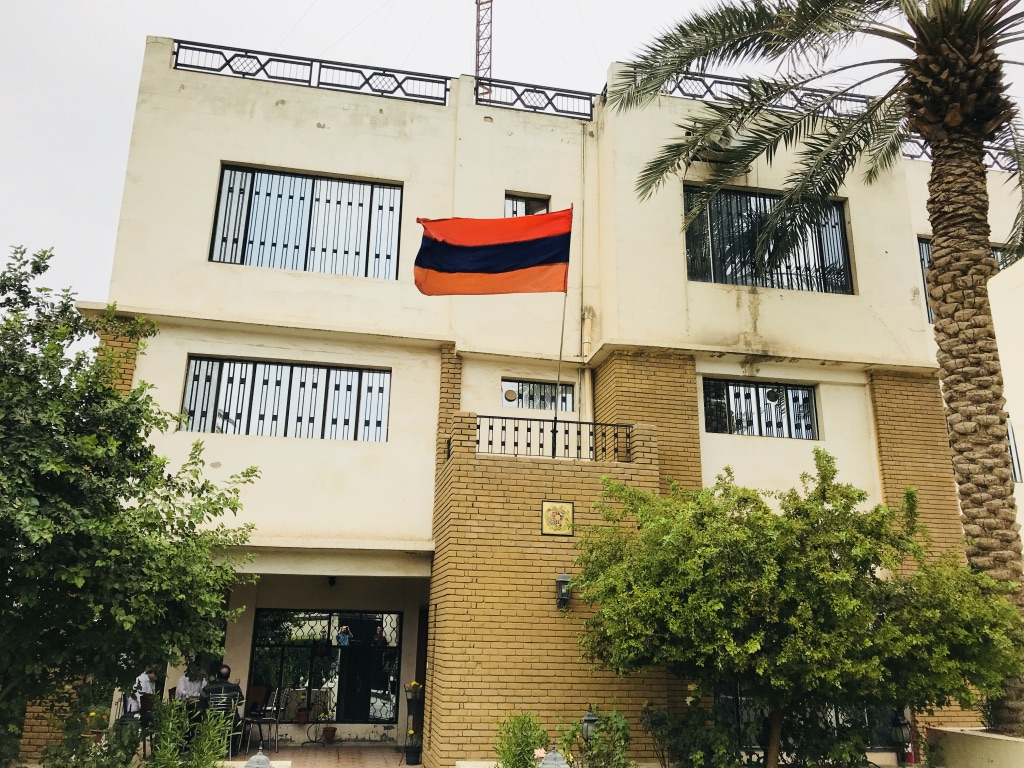
- Chancery of the Armenian Embassy
- Location: Green Zone, Baghdad, Iraq
- Address: House 5, Street 11, Section 215
- Ambassador: H.E. Mr. Hrachya Poladian

The Embassy of Armenia in Baghdad is the diplomatic mission of Armenia to Iraq. The chancery is located within Baghdad's International Zone (Green Zone).

== Bilateral relations ==
Diplomatic relations between Armenia and the Republic of Iraq were established on 12 February 1992. In 2000, Armenia opened its embassy in Baghdad, and the Embassy of Iraq was opened in Yerevan in 2001.

Due to the war in 2003, Armenia and Iraq had temporarily interrupted the activities of their embassies. Armenia reopened its embassy in Baghdad in October 2010. The Iraqi Embassy in Yerevan resumed its activities in 2012.

== Representative ==
Since November 2018, Hrachya Poladian serves as the Armenian Ambassador in Baghdad.

== See also ==
- Armenia–Iraq relations
- List of diplomatic missions of Armenia
