= Avzrog =

- Village
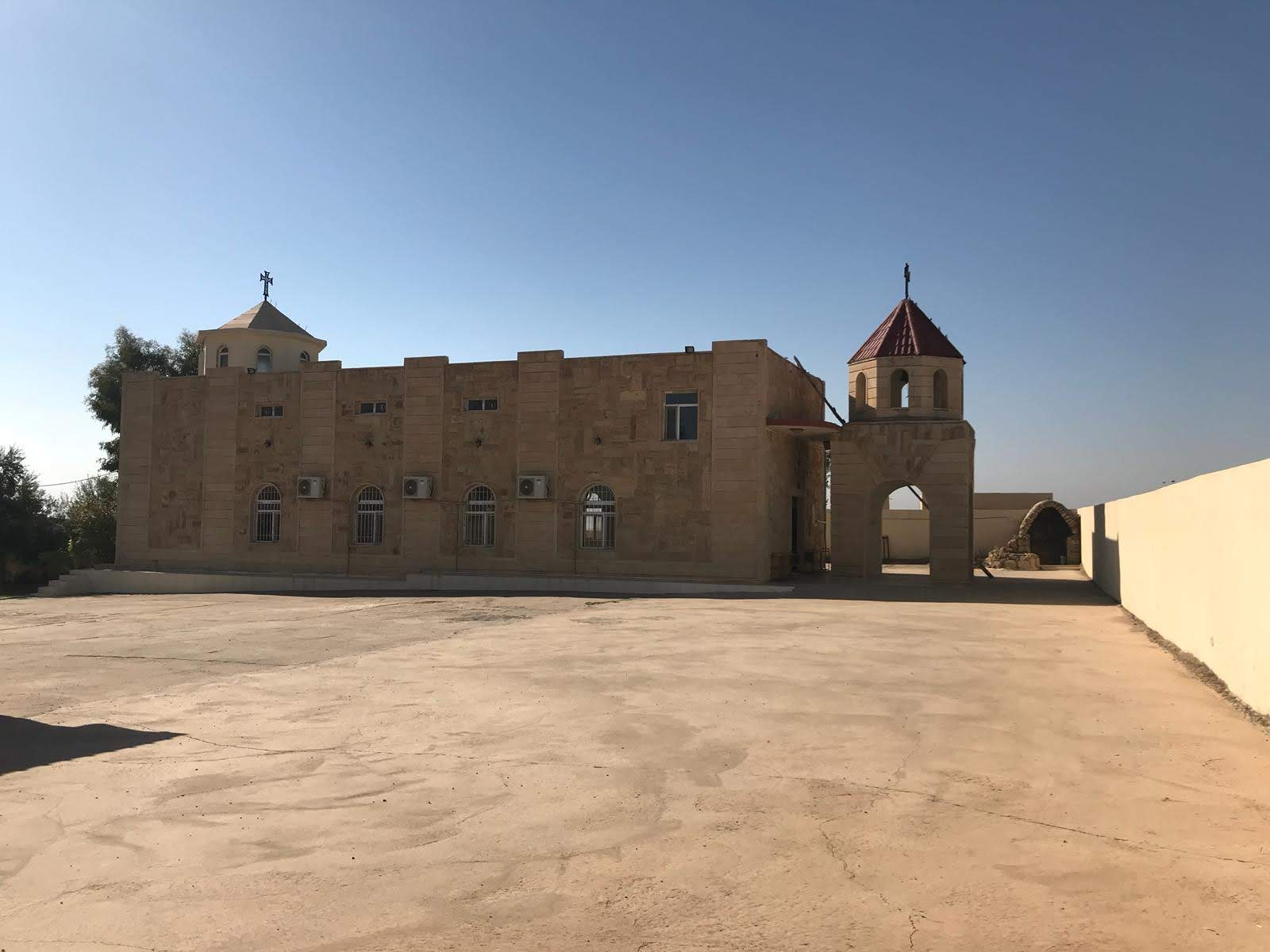
- The Armenian Sourb Vardan Church in Avzrok Miri

- Location in Iraq Avzrog (Iraqi Kurdistan)
- Coordinates: Lower Avzrog (Avzrog Miri); 36.94255°N 42.62965°E; Upper Avzrog (Avzrog Shano); 37.02012°N 42.51271°E
- Country: Iraq
- Region: Kurdistan Region
- Governorate: Dohuk Governorate
- District: Simele District
- Sub-district: Batel

Avzrog (Note: (Arabic: أفزروك; Armenian: Աւզրուկ; Kurdish: ئاڤزریك; Syriac: ܐܦ̮ܙܪܘܟ). Alternatively transliterated as Avzarok, Avzerok, Avzerog, or Avzrouk.) is a village in Dohuk Governorate in Kurdistan Region, Iraq. It is located in the district of Simele. The village is divided into lower and upper sections. In Avzrog Shano, there is a church of Mar Gewargis, and in Avzrog Miri, there is an Armenian Apostolic church of Sourp Vartan.

== Etymology ==
The name of the village is derived from "av" ("water" in Kurdish) and "zer" ("yellow" in Kurdish), and thus Avzrog translates to "yellow water".

== History ==
Avzrog Miri was founded in 1933 by Kurdish-speaking Armenians from the village of Gaznar, near Van in Turkey, who had taken refuge at Zakho amidst the Armenian genocide in 1915–1917, during the First World War, whereas Avzrog Shano was settled by Syriac-speaking Assyrians in 1936. The former was mostly inhabited by Armenians, with some Assyrians, whilst the latter was exclusively inhabited by Assyrians. A Syriac school was built at Avzrog Shano in 1947, and an Arabic school at Avzrog Miri was constructed in 1950. In the Iraqi census of 1957, Avzrog Miri was populated by 176 people.

The eruption of the First Iraqi–Kurdish War in 1961 spurred the villagers of Avzrog Shano to flee and seek refuge elsewhere until the war's conclusion in 1970, during which time, the village was looted and burned in four separate attacks. However, the villagers' return was short-lived as both Avzrog Miri and Avzrog Shano were destroyed and their inhabitants displaced by the Iraqi government in 1975, at which time the former had a population of 50 families, and 60 families in the latter. As part of the government's policy of Arabisation, the village was resettled by Arabs.

In the aftermath of the 1991 uprisings in Iraq, the Arab settlers fled, 25 Assyrian families returned to Avzrog Shano, and the Armenians began to gradually return to Avzrog Miri in 1996 after the construction of 65 houses. At Avzrog Miri, the church of Sourb Vardan was built in 2002, and the Supreme Committee of Christian Affairs constructed 20 houses and a hall, renovated the school and church, and developed the infrastructure of Avzrog Shano in the following year. More Armenians returned to Avzrog Miri in 2005 after the restoration of 40 houses, construction of 20 new houses, and development of the village's infrastructure by the Supreme Committee of Christian Affairs.

Avzrog Miri was visited by Archbishop Avak Asadourian in 2011, and was inhabited by 390 Armenians and 200 Chaldean Catholics in 2012. (Note: The Iraqi Kurdistan Christianity Project erroneously places 390 Armenians at Avzrog Shano, whereas c. 350 Armenians are attested at Avzrog Miri in 2014, and in 2018.) In the same year, 600 Syriac Orthodox Christians and 185 Chaldean Catholics resided at Avzrog Shano. The Assyrian Aid Society provided humanitarian aid to the village on 2 September 2014, and on 27 January 2015. As of November 2017, Avzrog Miri is inhabited by 268 people with 67 families, whilst Avzrog Shano has a population of 124 people with 31 families.

== Notable people ==
- Aram Shahin Davud Bakoyan (b. 1954), Iraqi-Armenian politician.
- Luis Caro Bandar (b. 1954), Assyrian politician

== Bibliography ==
- Chyet, Michael L. (2003). Kurdish–English Dictionary. Yale University Press.
- Donabed, Sargon George (2010). Iraq and the Assyrian Unimagining: Illuminating Scaled Suffering and a Hierarchy of Genocide from Simele to Anfal (PDF).
- Donabed, Sargon George (2015). Reforging a Forgotten History: Iraq and the Assyrians in the Twentieth Century. Edinburgh University Press.
- Eshoo, Majed (2004). The Fate Of Assyrian Villages Annexed To Today's Dohuk Governorate In Iraq And The Conditions In These Villages Following The Establishment Of The Iraqi State In 1921 (PDF). Translated by Mary Challita.
