= Seta Hagopian =

Iraqi singer of Armenian origin (born 1950)

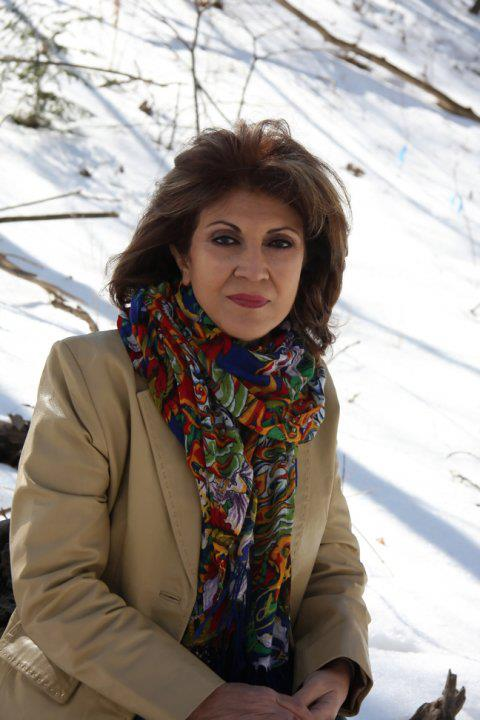

Background information
- Born: July 28, 1950 (age 75)
- Origin: Basra, Iraq
- Genres: Iraqi music, Iraqi folk music, Arabic music
- Occupation: Singer
- Years active: 1968–1984

Seta Hagopian (Arabic: سيتا هاكوبيان; Western Armenian: Սեդա Յակոբեան; born July 28, 1950, in Basra, Iraq) is an Iraqi singer of Armenian origin. Her singing career began in 1968 which led to much success for she is known to be the "Warm voice of Iraq" and has been dubbed as Iraq's Fairouz.

== Early career ==
Born in Basra, Iraq, to a family of Christian Iraqi Armenians. Her father was a tennis player who represented Iraq in numerous tournaments. Soon after Hagopian's career had begun, she was working with the most prominent composers such as Tariq al-Shibli, Farouk Hilal Khammash, Elias Rahbani and Ahmed Qasim.

Hagopian's style of music was one of the first to renew Iraqi songs through the introduction of Western instruments along with singing contemporary pop music. She has held concerts across the entire Arab world, including Iraq, Egypt, Algeria, the United Arab Emirates, Qatar as well as across Europe in Uzbekistan, Russia, Germany, Bulgaria and Spain.

Hagopian left Iraq to settle in Qatar in 1997. Since 2013 she resides in Toronto, Canada.

== Personal life ==
She is married to director Emad Bahjat. Hagopian is mother to two daughters, Nova and Naire. Nova Emad is a singer who currently resides in Canada and is following in her mother's footsteps in renewing the classical Iraqi music by infusing it with new genres, like hip hop/trance and Bossa-Nova. Naire is an editor, director, and photographer.
