= Avak Asadourian =

Iraqi bishop

His Eminence Archbishop Avak Asadourian
- Primate of the Armenian Diocese of Iraq
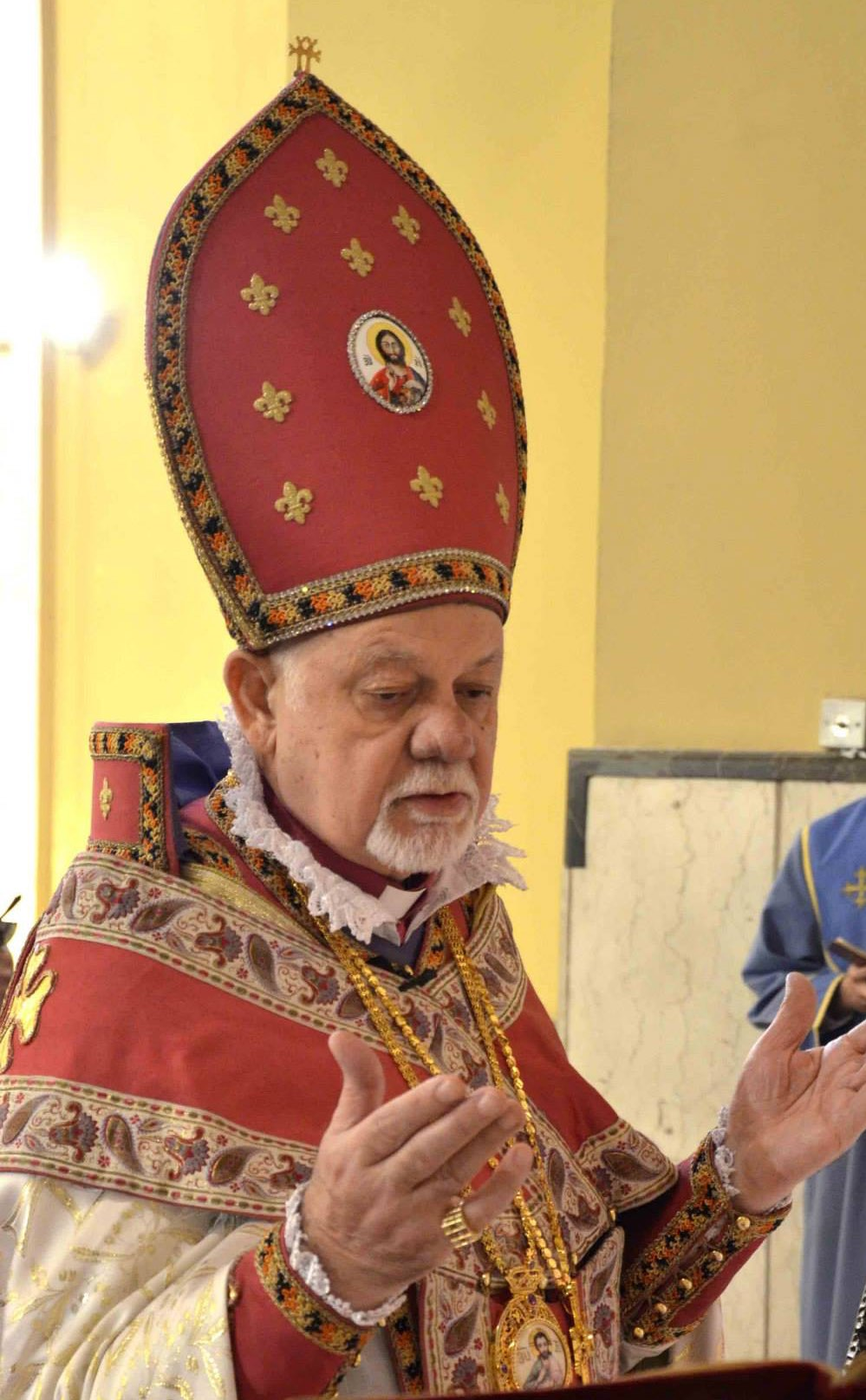
- Archbishop Avak Asadourian, Primate of the Armenian Apostolic Church in Iraq
- Native name: Ավագ Արքեպիսկոպոս Ասատուրյան
- Church: Armenian Apostolic Church
- Diocese: Armenian Diocese of Iraq
- See: Mother See of Holy Etchmiadzin
- Elected: April 1980 and enthroned in 2015
- Other posts: Secretary General, Council of Christian Church Leaders in Baghdad

Personal details
- Born: 1942 (age 83–84) Baghdad, Iraq
- Denomination: Armenian Apostolic

Avak Asadourian – Armenian: Ավագ Արքեպիսկոպոս Ասատուրյան (baptismal name Vazken) (born 26 February 1942) is the Primate of the Armenian Apostolic Church (See of Etchmiadzin) in Iraq.

== Early life and education ==
Avag archbishop Asadourian was born in 1942 in Baghdad, Iraq. Upon his graduation from primary (Svajean Armenian School) and secondary schools, he embarked on a quest to continue his higher education. From 1962 to 1965, he studied at the Jesuit-run City Engineering Faculty of the Al-Hikma University of Baghdad. He continued his studies, after being awarded a 5-year scholarship by the Calouste Gulbenkian Foundation, by attending the Department of Philosophy at the Benedictine University, in Illinois, US where he earned a Bachelor's degree, graduating in 1970.

He went on to study Philosophy at Tulane University in New Orleans where he earned his master's degree. While earning his PhD at Tulane, he also delivered lectures in the Philosophy department. In 1973, he was one of two students chosen to represent Tulane University at the International Leaders Assembly of Washington, the purpose of which was to introduce the working methods of the US government to the students.

From 1973 to 1976, he worked in the AGBU office of New York as the administrative assistant of the Eastern district, at the same time teaching Armenian language both in the Headquarters and in the AGBU.

Continuing with his studies, he enrolled in the St. Vladimir Seminary in New York and graduated with a Master of Divinity Degree in June 1996, and in November 1998, successfully defended his thesis to receive a PhD and the honors of Summa Cum Laude at Holy Cross Pontifical University. His PhD thesis entitled "The Moral Quest of Abu Hamid al-Ghazali as delineated in Mizan al-'Amal (The Criterion of Action)" was prepared for publication in book-format and printed in 2017 in Beirut by Pomigravure Printing House.

== Priesthood ==
He was ordained to the diaconate at 1974 at the St. Vartan Mother Cathedral of New York by Archbishop Torkom Manoogian. In May 1977, he was ordained as a celibate priest in the Mother Cathedral of Holy Etchmiadzin by Bishop Housik Santourian, and given the priestly name of Avak. Upon his ordination he was appointed to serve as the parish priest of the Holy Mother of Christ (now St. Stephens) church of Elberon New Jersey, USA. While there, he participated in the meetings of the National Church Assembly, representing the Eastern Diocese of the Armenian Church of America.

In February 1978, during the visit of the Supreme Patriarch and Catholicos of All Armenians, Vazgen I, he received the rank of Archimandrite.

He returned to Iraq and was appointed to serve as the Locum Tenens of the Armenian Diocese of Iraq. In April 1980, the Deputy Council of the Armenian Diocese of Iraq, elected him to serve as the Primate of the Diocese. As of 2015 he had been continuously re-elected. Upon the successful defense of his thesis entitled "This History of Soterology", he received the rank of Senior Archimandrite (Armenian: Ծայրագույն Վարդապետ, Dzayraguyn Vardapet) at the St. Mesrop church of Oshakan by Archbishop Sion Manoukian.

== Bishop and Archbishop ==
In February 1982 Father Avak was consecrated a bishop at the Mother See of Holy Etchmiadzin, Armenia by Vazgen I.

In 1984 and 1988 together with the religious leaders of different denominations of Iraq, Bishop Avak Asadourian visited the Pope of Rome. He met with the members of different Vatican committees, the Secretary of the WCC, the International Red Cross Commission, the Archbishop of Canterbury and the Committees of the Catholic Churches of different countries. The aim of these visits was to promote the establishment of peace between Iraq and Iran.

In 1984 Bishop Avak Asadourian organized a five-year-program of study for married men who after their graduation and ordination to the priesthood, would serve in the Armenian Diocese of Iraq. In 1980, when Avak Asadourian was elected as the Primate of Iraq, five of eight parishes had no priest.

He was one of 300 delegates who participated in the conference of Interchurch Support and Service Assembly of the WCC, which took place in Cyprus in 1986. At the meeting Avak Asadourian was elected as a member of the Management and Planning Commission. He took steps to include the Armenian genocide of 1915 in the definition of the final resolution.

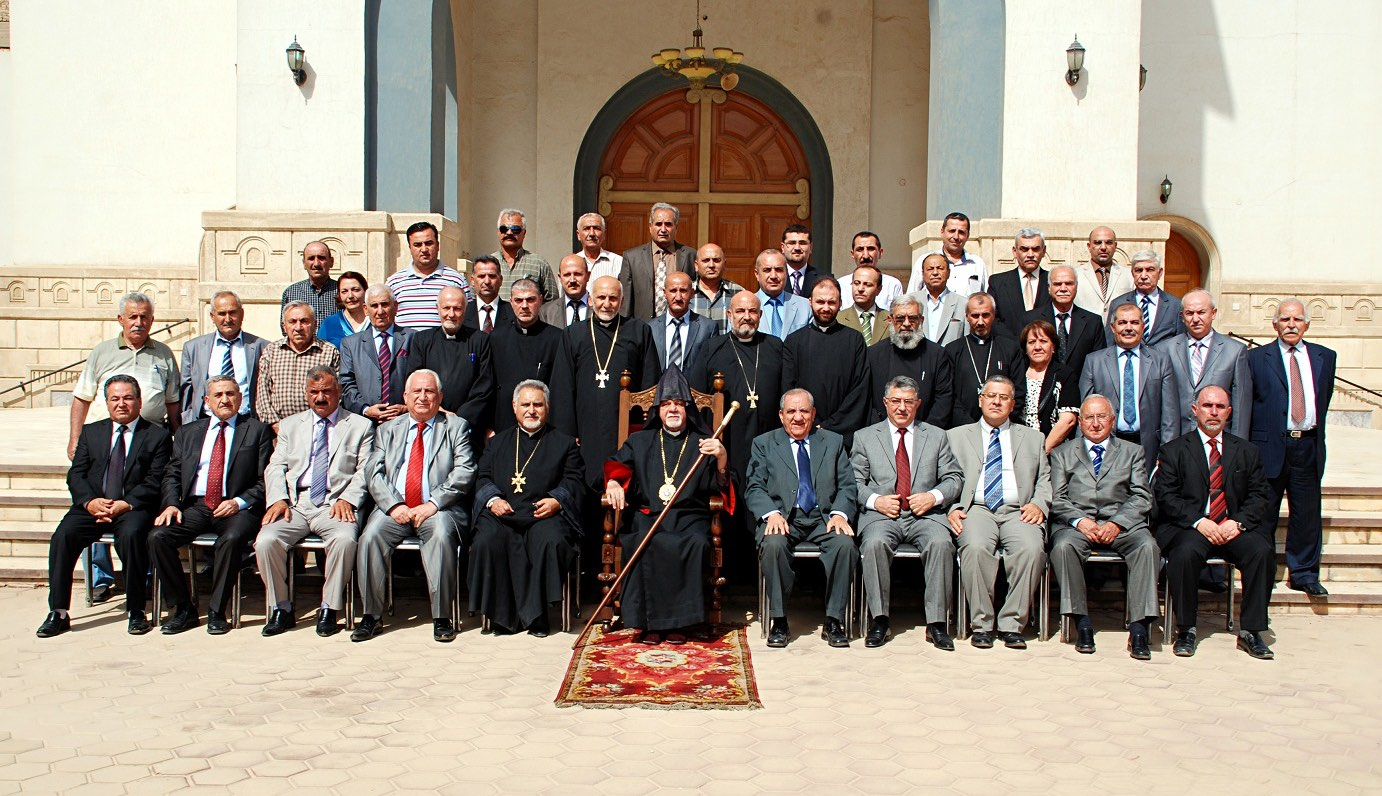
Armenian Diocesan Assembly in Iraq, 12 May 2012 Baghdad

In 1991, when the Persian Gulf War erupted, he served as a member of a delegation that met with Pope John Paul II (his fifth visit), the members of WCC, Bishop Council of Catholic Church and high officials of European Countries. He also met the UN Secretary General in New York City. During this time, he often participated in the meetings of Middle East Church Council in Amman on the impact of the Persian Gulf War.

From 1992 to 1995 he had the opportunity to visit the Churches of Sweden, Denmark, Scotland, Switzerland and England upon the invitation of these Church Councils or church leaders.

He was elevated to the rank of Archbishop by the Pontifical Encyclical of Vazgen I in December 1993.

== Primate of the Armenian Diocese of Iraq ==
During his service as the Primate of the Armenian Diocese of Iraq, Archbishop Avak Asadourian, working together with the Diocesan Council, established many programs. In 1985 he established Sunday schools in the Church Headquarters Church and in different parishes. The choir of the Headquarter Church was reorganized, another church choir consisting of young boys and girls, as well as choirs for 4 other churches were developed.

In 1986 he established the Armenian Church-loving people's Union. People of all ages attend the events organized by the union; they participate in the lectures delivered on the study of scripture and Armenian Church History. 200 people are enrolled in this program started by 9 young boys and girls.

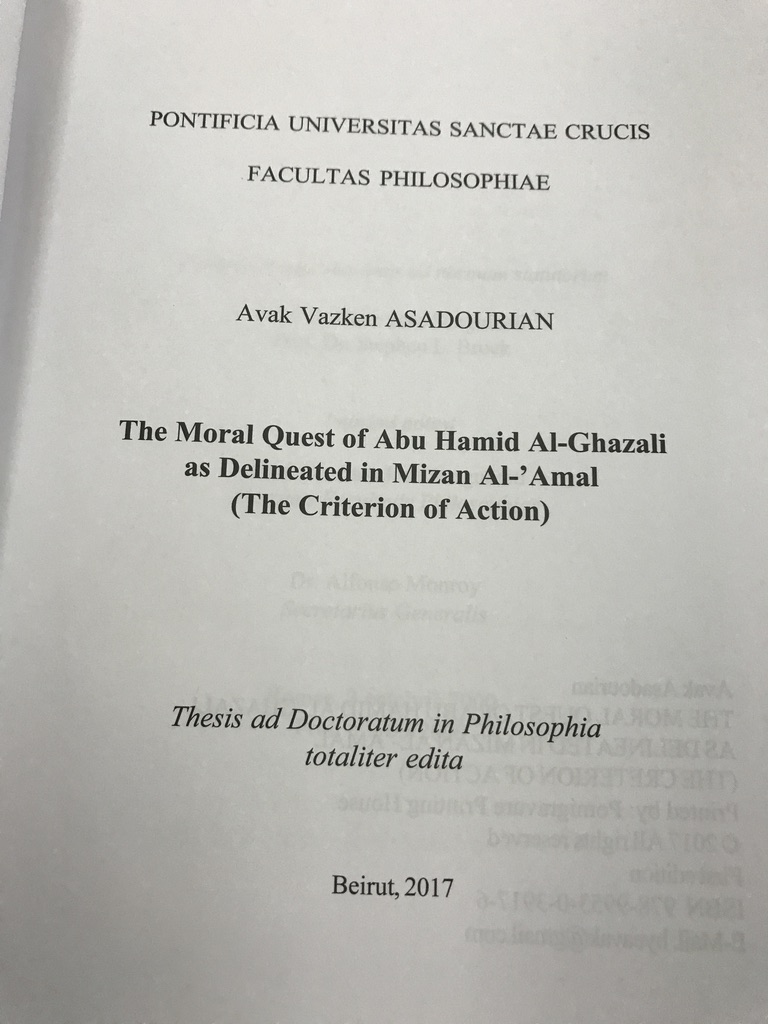
Avak Asadourian's PhD thesis entitled "The Moral Quest of Abu Hamid al-Ghazali as delineated in Mizan al-'Amal (The Criterion of Action)" published in Beirut, 2017

He undertook numerous building projects, the most significant being the creation of a museum for the Diocesan Headquarters. He collected manuscripts, encyclicals, holy objects, icons, and vestments and recording and cataloging them for the museum. The official opening of the museum took place in November 1997. It was named the "Senior Archimandrite Mesrop's Museum". Other major projects were; the construction of the Church of Holy Martyrs; the enlargement of the four Armenian churches of Baghdad; the construction of a greater complex for the Holy Mother of Christ Church of Baghdad; the construction of a new church for the village of Avzrouk, inhabited by Armenians, in the north of Iraq; establishment of cultural centers which include classrooms, a museum, a library and a great hall and the installation of a cross-stone (khatchkar) dedicated to the memory of the Armenian genocide.

Archbishop Avak published various works including; a book on the services of the "Holy Week", articles on the lives of Gregory of Narek, Nerses the Graceful and Gregory of Tatev.

On 9 February 2010, a meeting of representatives from the Christian Churches in Iraq was held at the St. Garabed Armenian Church in Baghdad. During the meeting, the representatives created a new organization titled, Council of Religious Leaders of the Christian Communities of Iraq. The council is composed of 2 Patriarchs, 26 Archbishops and Bishops representing 30 Christian-Church Communities in Iraq. By unanimous vote Avak Asadourian was elected General Secretary of the Council and his last re-election was in 2017.

In September 2011 Archbishop Avak was awarded The Medal of Services to the Motherland (second degree) by the President of Armenia, Serzh Sargsyan.

Archbishop Asadourian ordained and consecrated several Armenian Churches in Iraq. On 3 September 2015 he consecrated St. Sargis Church in Havrez, Iraqi Kurdistan, and on 14 October 2016 St. Mary Armenian church in the city of Kirkuk.

== See also ==
- Armenians in Iraq
- List of Iraqi Armenians
