= Iraqi Armenians =

Ethnic group of Iraq

Iraqi Armenians العراقيين الأرمن իրաքահայեր
- Armenia Iraq

Total population
- 6,000 (2011); about 10,000 prior to the 2003 invasion of Iraq

Regions with significant populations
- Cities: Baghdad, Mosul, Basra, Kirkuk, Baqubah, Dohuk and Zakho; Villages: Avzrog, Havresk and Ishkender

Languages
- Western Armenian; Mesopotamian Arabic; Kurdish

Religion
- Christianity (mostly Armenian Apostolic, some Armenian Catholics and pockets of Evangelical and Brethren Protestants)

Iraqi Armenians (Arabic: أرمنيون عراقيون ’Armanion Iraqion; Armenian: իրաքահայեր irakahayer) are Iraqi citizens and residents of Armenian ethnicity. Many Armenians settled in Iraq after fleeing the 1915 Armenian genocide. It is estimated that there are 6,000–8,000 Armenians living in Iraq, with communities in Baghdad, Mosul, Basra, Kirkuk, Baqubah, Dohuk, Zakho and Avzrog.

== History ==
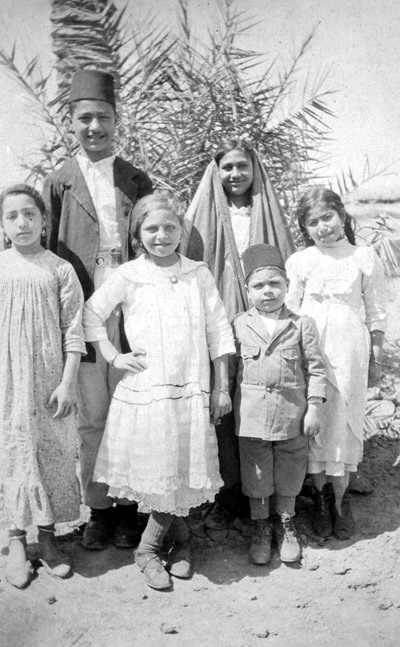
Armenian children in Baghdad, 1918

The history of Armenians in Iraq is documented since late Babylonian times. However, the general roots of the contemporary Armenian community in Iraq can be largely traced to Shah Abbas's forced relocation of the Armenians to Iran in 1604, some of whom subsequently moved on to settle in Iraq. A further 25,000 Armenians arrived in Iraq during the early twentieth century as they fled the persecution of the Armenian genocide. They established schools, athletic and cultural clubs, and political and religious institutions in urban centers across the breadth of Iraq.

During the 1980s, the Armenian community flourished as a result of President Saddam Hussein's modernization efforts, and good treatment of Armenians as it continued to rebuild its cultural institutions and even consecrated an imposing cathedral in Baghdad. Saddam retained many Armenians among his personal entourage: his nanny was Iraqi-Armenian, along with one of his body guards, his jeweler, tailor, and housestaff.

== Armenians and the political situation ==
After the launch of the second Iraqi campaign, more than 3,000 Armenians left the country, head of National Management of Armenians in Iraq Paruyr Hakopian stated. “Four years have passed since the launch of military campaign in Iraq by Coalition forces. And I confirm with certainty that the number of Armenians who have immigrated abroad does not exceed this mark,” he noted. Mr. Hakopian said four years ago there were 18,000 Armenians in Iraq and now only 15,000 of them live in the country. Generally during the past 4 years 1,500 Armenians immigrated to Syria, about 1,000 arrived in Armenia and about 500 departed for Jordan,” he stressed.

Many Armenians served in the military during Iraq's eight-year war with Iran and the Persian Gulf War. More than 130 from Zakho (a town with an Armenian population 1,500-strong) were killed in the conflict with Iran while three others, also from Zakho, were killed in coalition air strikes in Kuwait, Basra, and Mosul. Civilian casualties in the aftermath of the Persian Gulf War, following the rebellion by the Kurds, included four Armenian babies who died in fighting near the Turkish border.

=== 2003 invasion of Iraq ===
With the invasion of Iraq, the situation for Iraqi Armenians, just like the rest of Iraqis have been subject to killings and kidnappings for ransom. Many Armenians have immigrated to, Europe, the US, Canada, and Australia.

In October 2007, two Armenian women in Iraq were killed by the Australian private security contractors, Unity Resources Group, in Almasbah district in Baghdad.

The Armenian winner of the Miss Iraq competition went into hiding out of fear of being targeted by Islamic militants.

=== Deployment of Armenian troops ===
Armenia took part in the efforts of the US-led Coalition by sending a group of 46 non-military personnel, including 30 truck drivers, 10 bomb detonation experts, three doctors and three officers. They served under the Polish command in the city of Karbala and the nearby town of Hillah.

In October 2008, Armenia ended its modest presence in Iraq, citing improved security and the ongoing withdrawal of a much larger Polish army contingent that has supervised Armenian troops deployed in the country.

== Religion ==
The Iraqi Armenian community, fairly wealthy and important, is also of great age. In fact the Armenian Church in Baghdad is so old that it is regarded as sacred by Muslims, who worship there periodically.

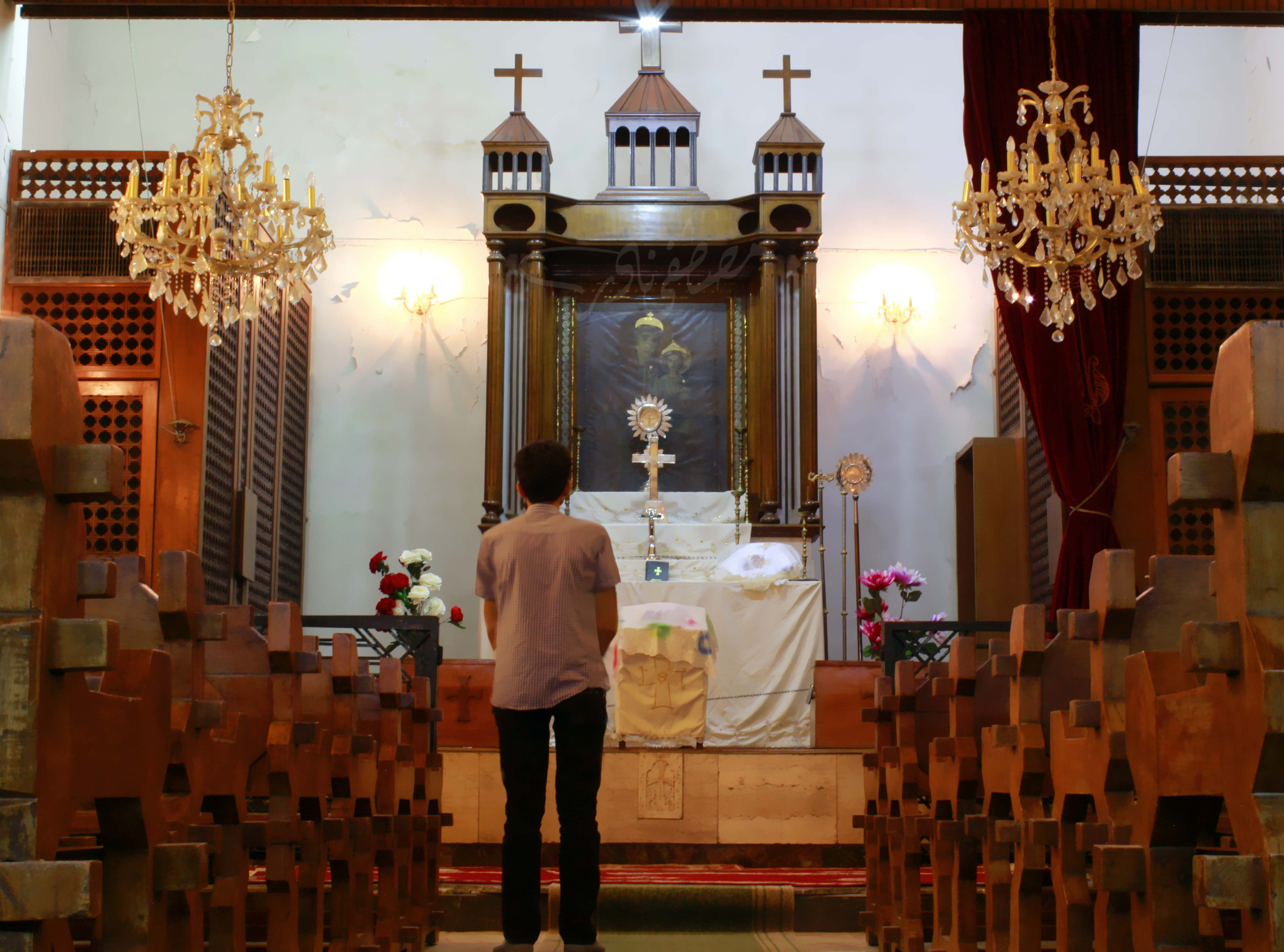
The interior of Armenian Church in Baghdad.

Armenians in Iraq are mostly members of the Armenian Apostolic Church (also known as Armenian Orthodox) or Armenian Catholic Church.

St. Gregory the Illuminator Armenian Apostolic Church (at Younis al Sabaawi Square, Baghdad) is the main church for the Armenians of Iraq. There is also the Saint Vartan Armenian Apostolic Church in Dohuk, northern Iraq. Avak Archbishop Asadourian is the Primate of the Armenian Apostolic Diocese in Iraq since April 1980.

The Armenian Catholic Archbishopric Church maintains a presence in Baghdad, as does the Armenian Evangelical Church of Baghdad.

Some Armenian churches were also targets of bombing and some Armenians have died as a result of sectarian fighting in Iraq.

== Contributions to Iraqi culture ==
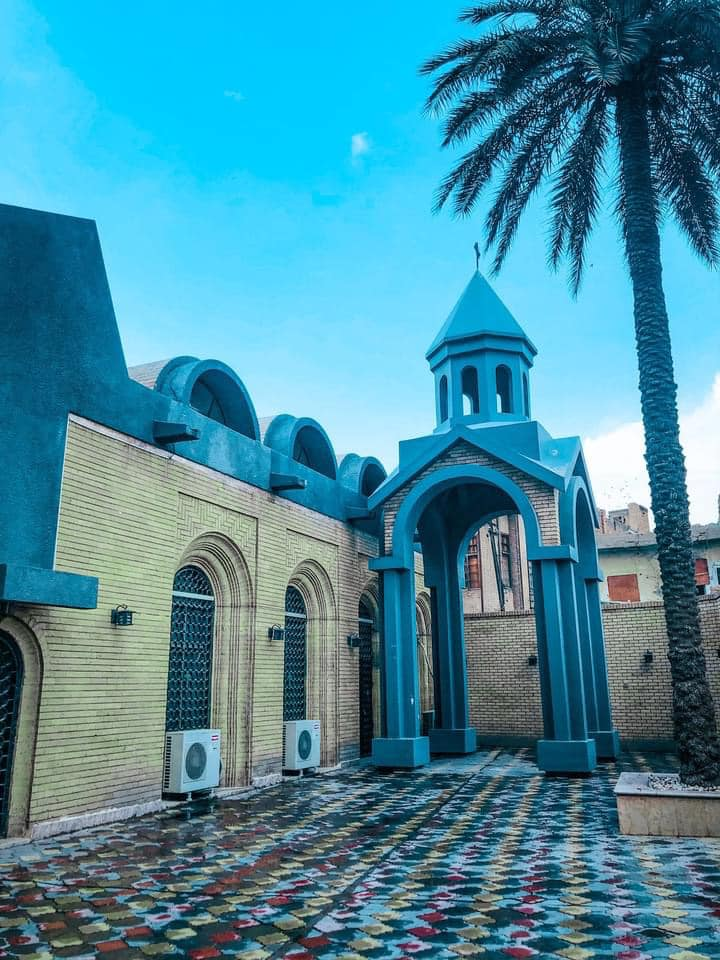
Sourp Asdvadzadzin Church in Baghdad.

The two founding members of the Western-style pop group Unknown to No One, Art Haroutunian and Shant Garabedian, are of Armenian heritage. During Saddam's reign the band could only have its music aired once they sang a song celebrating the Presidents's birthday. Unknown to No One has been given a large amount of publicity in the post-Saddam era.

The famous singer Seta Hagopian is also of Armenian descent.

== In the Kurdistan Region ==
The main city of Armenians, and the seat of the Armenian church, is Zakho.

In 1915, some Kurds and tribes participated in, or supported the Armenian genocide along with the Ottoman Army. Other Kurds opposed the genocide. The Armenian populations in Iraqi Kurdistan have been in the region since the 1920s, after they were displaced in the Armenian genocide. Their numbers have increased considerably with waves of new immigration coming from Baghdad and other Iraqi regions after the toppling of Saddam. Armenians attribute their leaving towards the north to safety concerns. A Kurdish Government official representing the Armenian community reported to Araratnews in 2011 that Iraqi Kurdistan had 3,600–3,800 Armenians- but this number is likely much higher now due to population displacements due to ISIS and Kurdish annexations of disputed territory. The Armenians of Iraqi Kurdistan have two schools (in Erbil and Dohuk) and five churches (in Dohuk, Erbil, Avzrog, Havresk, Zakho).

The Armenians in Iraqi Kurdistan have one reserved minority seat in the parliament of the Kurdistan Region of Iraq.

=== Armenian villages ===
==== Avzrog ====
A notable Armenian village exists in Avzrog, a village in the Iraqi province of Dohuk. There are in fact two Avzrogs: one populated by Armenians, and the other by Assyrians. Assyrians and Armenians maintain good relations as both were persecuted by Turks and Kurds in the Ottoman Empire. The name of the village comes from the Kurdish language: av (water) and zrog (yellow). The Armenian one is called Avzrog Miri, while the Assyrian is called Avzrog Shno.

The village was built for the first time in 1932 when the Armenians of Zakho and its suburbs decided to establish the village and settle in it. The village was destroyed in 1975 by Saddam Hussein and resettled with Arabs. In 1996, the town was repopulated with Armenians and the Arab tribes who settled in the village were driven out, and later on the local St Vartans church was reconsecrated and built in 2001. Additionally, although the villagers are Armenian, they do not speak Armenian but Kurdish. Armenians in Avzrog maintain their Armenian social identity like folklore, religion and names nevertheless. Avzrog has a total population of about 350 people.

The Armenian church of Avzrog is dedicated to Sourp Vartan.

==== Havresk ====
Havresk is an Armenian village founded in 1928 by Armenians fleeing Turkey in the Armenian genocide. It was a large and prosperous village during the 1950s, having an Artesian aquifer, library, church, and school. However, during the Al-Anfal Campaign it was destroyed and its Armenian residents forcibly evicted. It was rebuilt in 2005, however, and now has a population of 100 families. The village has 115 houses, a greenhouse, a school, and a church that was recently built in 2012. The town's mayor (mukhtar) is Murad Vardanian. The village is located roughly 5 miles southeast of Avzrog in the Plain south of Zakho.

The Armenian church of Havresk is dedicated to Sourp Sarkis.

==== Aghajanian ====
A small Armenian populated village of 20 houses was built in the Nineveh Plains of Iraq between the cities of Karemlash to the south and Bakhdida in the north. The village was created in order to accommodate Armenian refugees from Baghdad and other areas in Iraq. The village is named after the financier and developer of the village, the Assyrian politician and businessman Sarkis Aghajan Mamendo.

== See also ==
- Armenia–Iraq relations
- Armenian diaspora
- Armenians in the Middle East
- List of Iraqi Armenians
- Religion in Iraq
- Christianity in Iraq
