= Assyrian continuity =

Descent of modern Assyrians from ancient Assyrians

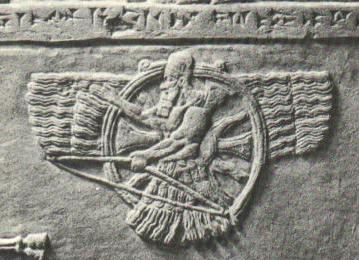
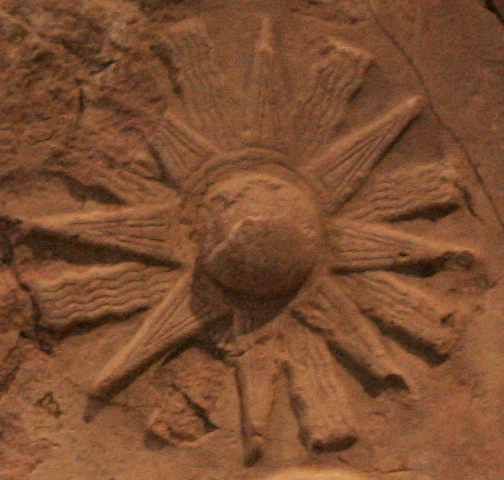
The modern Assyrian flag (top) uses ancient Assyrian iconography, including the god Ashur (bottom left) and the star of the god Shamash (bottom right)

The Assyrian continuity thesis is the idea that the modern Assyrians are to be culturally and historically identified with, and are the direct descendants of, the ancient Assyrians, who were one of several contemporary civilizations in Mesopotamia. This claimed heritage is a key aspect of the modern Assyrian identity. The modern Assyrian people are an ethno-linguistic and religious minority in their ancestral homeland, which spans parts of Iraq, northeastern Syria, southeastern Turkey, and northwestern Iran.

Assyrian culture and identity appear to have survived the violent collapse of the Neo-Assyrian Empire in 609 BC. During the long post-imperial period (6th century BC – 3rd century AD), when Assyria was also known as Athura, Provincia Assyria, and Asoristan, the Akkadian language gradually went extinct, completely disappearing by the 1st century AD. However, other aspects of the Assyrian civilization, such as religion, traditions, naming patterns, and the Akkadian-influenced dialects of East Aramaic survived in a reduced but recognizable form, before giving way to specifically native forms of Eastern Rite Christianity.

The gradual extinction of Akkadian and its replacement with Akkadian-influenced East Aramaic does not reflect the disappearance of the original Assyrian population; Aramaic was used not only by settlers, but also by native Assyrians and Babylonians, in time even becoming used by the royal administrations of Assyria and Babylonia themselves, and indeed retained by the succeeding Indo-European–speaking Achaemenid Empire. In fact, the new language of the Neo-Assyrian Empire, the Imperial Aramaic, was itself a creation of the Assyrian Empire and its people, and with its retention of an Akkadian grammatical structure and Akkadian words and names, is distinct from the Western Aramaic of the Levant which gradually replaced the Canaanite languages (with the partial exception of Hebrew). In addition, Aramaic also replaced other Semitic languages such as Hebrew, Phoenician, Arabic, Edomite, Moabite, Amorite, Ugarite, Dilmunite, and Chaldean among non-Aramean peoples without prejudicing their origins and identity. Since the Aramaic language was so deeply integrated into the empire and due to the fact it was spread chiefly by Assyria, in later Demotic Egyptian, Greek, and Mishanic Hebrew texts it was referred to as the "Assyrian writing." Due to assimilation efforts encouraged by Assyrian kings, fellow Semitic Arameans, Israelites, Judeans, Phoenicians, and other non-Semitic groups such as Hittites, Hurrians, Urartians, Phrygians, Persians, and Elamites deported into the Assyrian heartland are also likely to quickly have been absorbed into the native population, self-identified, and been regarded, as Assyrians. The Assyrian population of Upper Mesopotamia was largely Christianized between the 1st and 4th centuries AD, however Mesopotamian religion enduring among Assyrians in small pockets until the late Middle Ages, a further indication of continuity. Assyrian Aramaic-language sources from the Christian period predominantly use the self-designation Suryāyā ("Syrian") alongside "Athoraya", with early medieval Arab, Persian and Armenian sources using the derivative terms "Sūryānīyūn", "Asori" and "Assuri" respectively. The term Suryāyā, sometimes alternatively translated as "Syrian" or "Syriac", is generally accepted to derive from the ancient Akkadian Assūrāyu, meaning Assyrian. The academic consensus is that the modern name "Syria" originated as a shortened form of "Assyria" and applied originally only to Mesopotamian Assyria and not to the modern Levantine country of Syria. Christian Palestinian Aramaic texts, presumably with Greek influence, use the term "Suraya" and "Asuraya" interchangeably to refer to the ancient Assyrians.

Assyrian nationalism centered on a desire for self-determination developed near the end of the 19th century, coinciding with increasing contacts with Europeans, increasing levels of ethnic and religious persecution, along with increased expressions nationalism in other Middle Eastern groups, such as the Arabs, Armenians, Copts, Jews, Kurds, Persians, and Turks. Through the large-scale promotion of long extant terms and promotion of identities such as ʾĀthorāyā and ʾAsurāyā, Assyrian intellectuals and authors hoped to inspire the unification of the Assyrian nation, transcending long-standing religious denominational divisions between the Assyrian Church of the East, its 16th century offshoot, the Chaldean Catholic Church, the Syriac Orthodox Church, and various smaller largely Protestant denominations. This effort has been met with both support and some opposition from various religious communities; some denominations have rejected unity and promoted alternate religious identities, such as "Aramean", "Syriac", and "Chaldean". Though some religious officials and activists (particularly in the west) have promoted such identities as separate ethnic groups rather than simply religious denominational groups, they are not generally treated as such by international organizations or historians, and historically, genetically, geographically and linguistically these are all the same Assyrian people.

Many scholars in various fields have expressed support for Assyrian continuity. There is also some opposition, especially in the field of Syriac studies. According to the leading Syriac scholar Sebastian Brock, "the alleged ethnic identity with the ancient Assyrians is in fact a recent creation which has taken place in the course of the last century and a half, and it lacks any sound historical basis." According to Adam H. Becker, a Syriac scholar who has investigated the origins of Assyrian nationalism, the use of the word Assyrian itself for the modern ethnic group "derives from Western sources, not from a continuity of identity between the ancient Assyrians and the modern ones." Proponents of the thesis regard such statements as inaccurate and partial.

== Assyrians after the Assyrian Empire ==
=== Early assumption of Assyrian annihilation ===
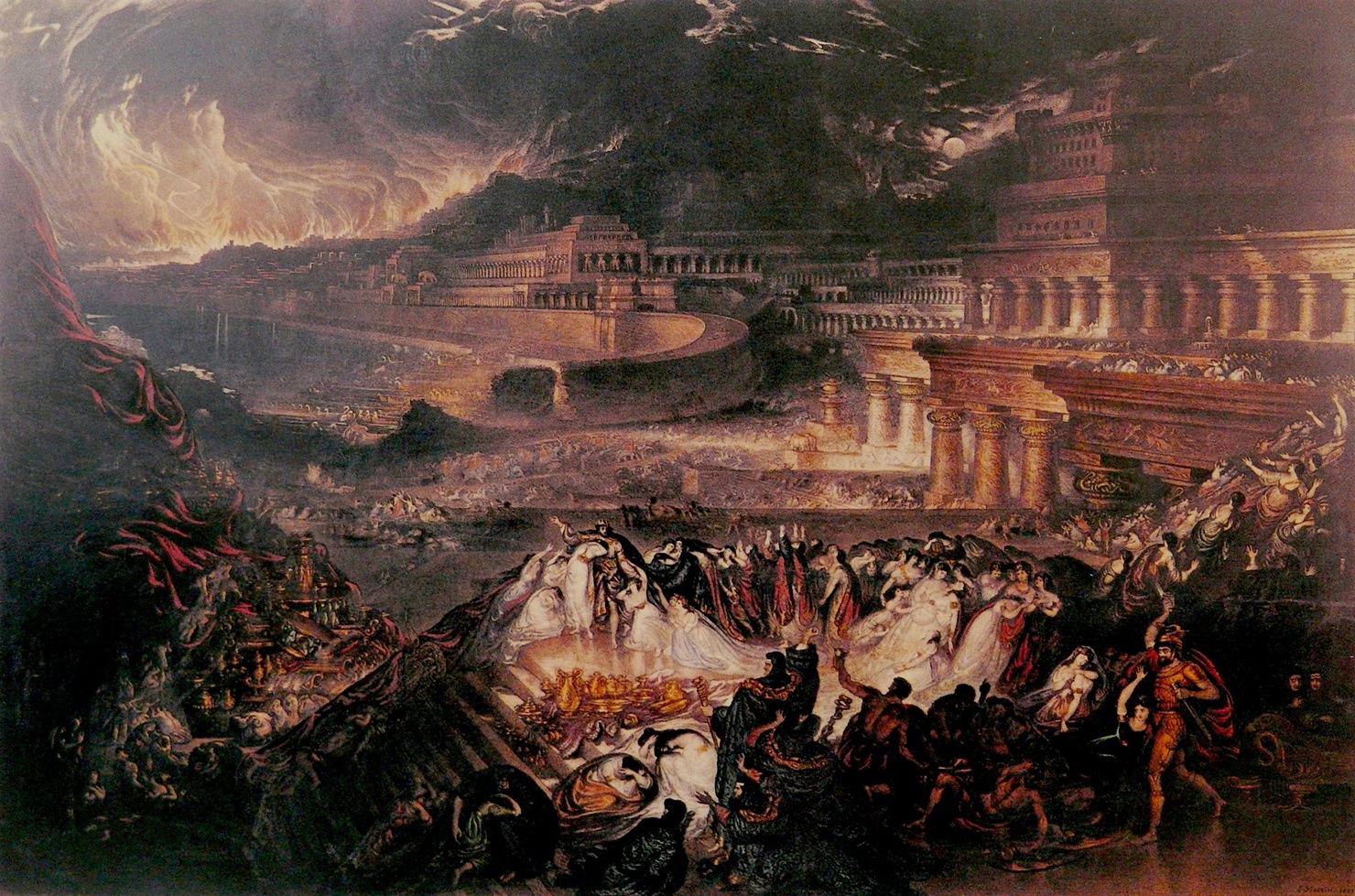
Fall of Nineveh (1829) by John Martin

Ancient Assyria fell in the late 7th century BC through the Medo-Babylonian conquest of the Assyrian Empire, with most of its major population centers violently sacked. In the millennia following the fall of Assyria, knowledge of the ancient empire chiefly survived in western literary tradition through accounts of Assyria in the Hebrew Bible and works by classical authors, both of which described Assyria's fall as violent and comprehensive destruction. Before the 19th century, the prevalent belief in Biblically influenced western scholarship was that ancient Assyria and Babylonia had been literally annihilated due to provoking divine wrath. This belief was reinforced through archaeologists in the Middle East initially not finding many remains fitting with the conventional European image of ancient cities, with stone columns and great sculptures, beyond those of ancient Persia; Assyria and other Mesopotamian civilizations left no magnificent ruins above ground—all that remained to see were huge grass-covered mounds in the plains which travellers at times believed to simply be natural features of the landscape. Early European archaeologists in the Middle East were also for the most part more interested in confirming Biblical truth through their excavations than to spend time on new interpretations of the evidence they discovered.

Though the Bible and other Hebrew texts describe the destruction of the Assyrian Empire, they do not actually claim that the Assyrian people were destroyed or replaced. The 2nd century BC apocryphal Book of Judith states that the Neo-Babylonian king Nebuchadnezzar II (r. 605–562 BC) "ruled over the Assyrians in the great city of Nineveh", the Book of Ezra refers to the Persian king Darius I as "king of Assyria", and the Book of Isaiah states that there will come a day when God will proclaim "Blessed be Egypt my people, and Assyria the work of my hands, and Israel my heritage". The erroneous idea of complete Assyrian annihilation, despite increasing evidence to the contrary, proved to be enduring in western academia. As late as 1925, the Assyriologist Sidney Smith wrote that "The disappearance of the Assyrian people will always remain a unique and striking phenomenon in ancient history. Other, similar kingdoms and empires have indeed passed away, but the people have lived on ... No other land seems to have been sacked and pillaged so completely as was Assyria". Just a year later, Smith had completely abandoned the idea of the Assyrians having been eradicated and recognized the persistence of Assyrians through the Christian period into the present.

=== Post-imperial Assyria in modern Assyriology ===
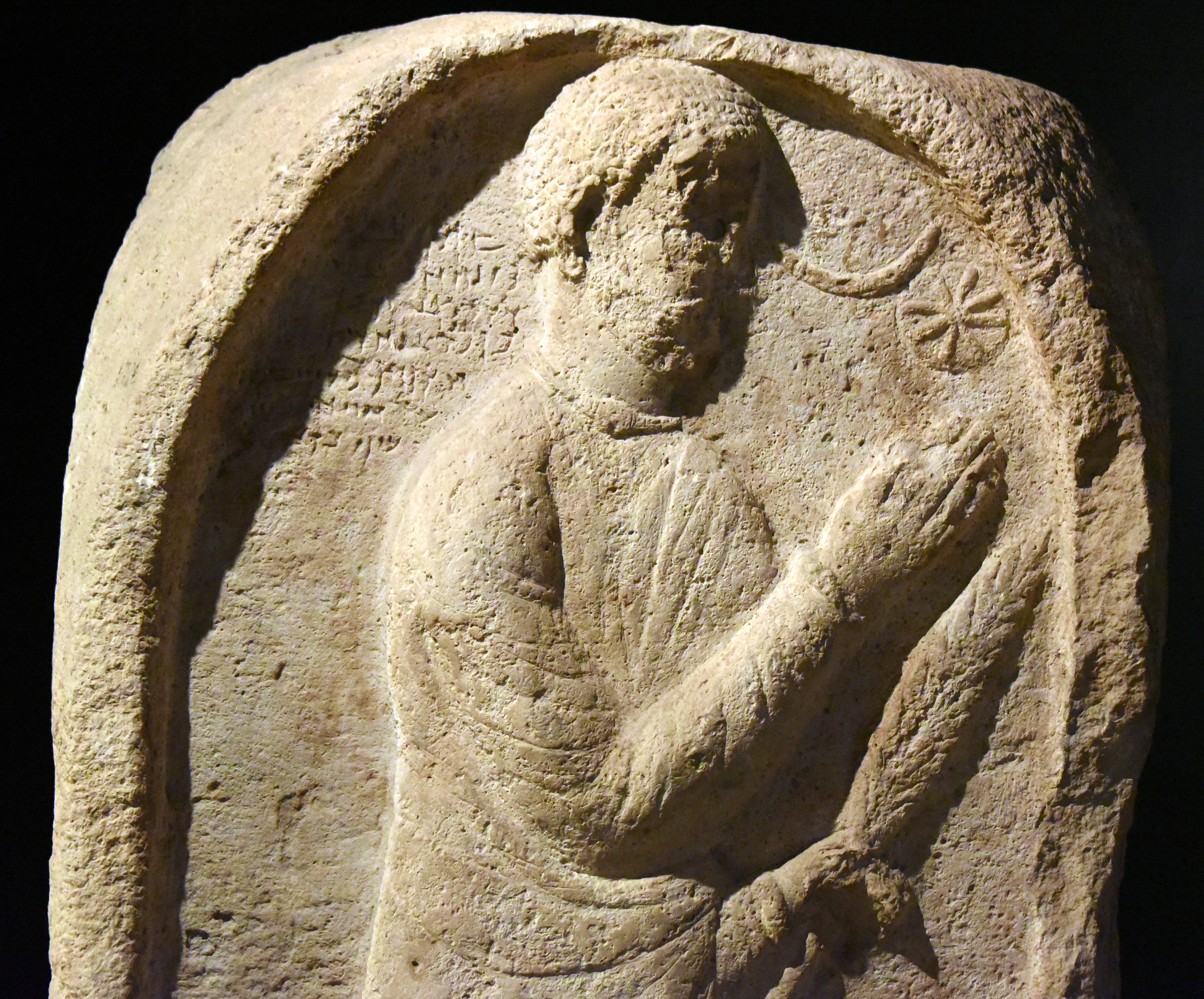
Stele in the style of ancient Assyrian royal steles, inscribed in Aramaic and erected in Assur in the 2nd century AD (under Parthian rule) by the local ruler Rʻuth-Assor

Modern Assyriology does not support the idea that the fall of Assyria also brought with it an eradication of the Assyrian people and their culture. Though in the past regarded as a "post-Assyrian" age, Assyriologists today consider the last period of ancient Assyrian history to be the long post-imperial period, extending from 609 BC to around AD 250 with the destruction of the semi-independent Assyrian states of Assur, Osroene, Adiabene, Beth Nuhadra and Beth Garmai by the Sassanid Empire, or to the end of Sassanid ruled Asoristan (Assyria) and the Islamic Conquest around 637 AD, and support a continuity into the present day.

Though the centuries that followed the fall of Assyria are characterized by a distinct lack of surviving sources from the region, at least in comparison to previous eras, the idea that Assyria was rendered uninhabited and desolated stems from the contrast with the richly attested Neo-Assyrian period, not from the actual extant written sources from the post-imperial period, which although reduced, remain unbroken through to the modern era.

Though the Assyrian bureaucracy and governmental institutions disappeared with Assyria's fall, Assyrian population centers and culture did not. At Dur-Katlimmu, one of the largest settlements along the Khabur river, a large Assyrian palace, dubbed the "Red House" by archaeologists, continued to be used in Neo-Babylonian times, with cuneiform records there being written by people with Assyrian names, in Assyrian style, though dated to the reigns of the early Neo-Babylonian kings. These documents mention officials with Assyrian titles and invoke the ancient Assyrian national deity Ashur. Two Neo-Babylonian texts discovered at the city of Sippar in Babylonia attest to there being royally appointed governors at both Assur and Guzana, another Assyrian site in the north. Arbela is attested as a thriving Assyrian city, but only very late in the Neo-Babylonian period, and there were attempts to revive the city of Arrapḫa in reign of Neriglissar (r. 560–556 BC), who returned a cult statue to the site. Harran was revitalized, with its great temple dedicated to the lunar god Sîn being rebuilt under Nabonidus whose mother was an Assyrian priestess from that city. (r. 556–539 BC). In nearby Edessa, Assyrian religious traditions also survived well into the common era. Even in certain regions beyond the Euphrates, the legacy of Assyria endured, such as in Hierapolis where Shalmaneser had once settled many Assyrians. By at least the second century CE, the memory of Semiramis and Sardanapalus was faithfully preserved by the city's inhabitants, as mentioned by Lucian.

The Assyrians who remained in their homeland clung to their old ways of living, as illustrated by the continuation of pottery forms discovered in certain areas, but also by the endurance of Assyrian cultural traditions expressed through various Aramaic legends like those of Ahiqar, Behnam, or Šamaš-šuma-ukin's rebellion against his brother Ashurbanipal. Aramaic speakers from the 9th century BCE to the late Hellenistic period lived, wrote, and thought in ways deeply connected to the practices and traditions of the Akkadian writing empires, and Aramaic scribes even purposefully adopted Assyrian and Babylonian Akkadian names for themselves in an effort to associate with the cultures of these kingdoms. Aramaic literature does not show a strong attachment to any ethnic group from the Iron Age. Instead, it celebrates the achievements of Assyrian, Egyptian, and Persian kings. In the legend of Ahiqar, Sennacherib is portrayed as a just and thoughtful ruler, in sharp contrast to the image presented in the book of Isaiah. At other times, Aramaic literature traces its lineage back to the Akkadian period with Sargon, or to Hebrew kings such as David, Solomon, and others. The story of Ahiqar, through its remembrance of the Assyrian court and its references to various Assyrian kings, attests to the continuing interest among Aramaic-speakers in identifying with an Assyrian past. It is possible that later Assyrians, seeking consolation after the fall of their empire, retained memories of their past by propagating narratives such as the Ahiqar story.

Individuals with Assyrian names are attested at multiple sites in Assyria and Babylonia during the Neo-Babylonian Empire, including Babylon, Nippur, Uruk, Sippar, Dilbat and Borsippa. The Assyrians in Uruk apparently continued to exist as a community until the reign of the Achaemenid king Cambyses II (r. 530–522 BC) and were closely linked to a local cult dedicated to Ashur. Many individuals with clearly Assyrian names are also known from the rule of the Achaemenid Empire, sometimes in high levels of government. A prominent example is Pan-Ashur-lumur, who served as the secretary of Cambyses II. Distinctively Assyrian names are also found in Aramaic and Greek throughout cities like Hatra, Assur, Dura-Europos and Palmyra, among other regions in the late antique period. Although the Assyrians no longer spoke Akkadian, they continued using traditions from Assyria's imperial period, with certain name forms surviving well into the Christian period and being attested in Syriac onomastica. In the former Assyrian territory, memories survived as tangible ruins of the past, providing later Assyrian generations who inhabited the land the means to connect themselves to an ancient past that they preserved, while Assyrian religious traditions also continued to endure even though Akkadian was forgotten. The temple dedicated to Ashur in Assur was rebuilt by local Assyrians in the reign of Cyrus the Great and Assyria also survived in exile within Babylonia, particularly within Uruk, owing to certain religious and cultural traditions surviving. The Assyrian region during this period appears to have prosperous, with multiple cities in the Assyrian satrapy being mentioned in Aramaic documents presumably as administrative centers. Assyria's rural conditions also appear to have been flourishing, with the countryside bearing abundant provisions for passing armies, and local Assyrians supplying livestock tribute to the Achaemenid kings, as depicted in reliefs.

Under the Seleucid and Parthian empires, further efforts were made to revitalize Assyria and the ancient great cities began to be resettled, with the predominant portion of the population remaining native Assyrian. The original Assyrian capital of Assur is in particular known to have flourished during the Parthian era. Continuity from ancient Assyria is clear in Assur and other cities such as Arbela during this period, with personal names of the city's denizens greatly reflecting names used in the Neo-Assyrian Empire, such as Qib-Assor ("command of Ashur"), Assor-tares ("Ashur judges") and even Assor-heden ("Ashur has given a brother", a late version of the name Aššur-aḫu-iddina, i.e. Esarhaddon), reflecting names extant in the lafe 3rd millennium BC. The Assyrians at Assur continued to follow the traditional ancient Mesopotamian religion, worshipping Ashur (at this time known as Assor) and other Mesopotamian gods such as Shamash, Ishtar, Sin, Adad, Bel, Nergal, Ninurta and Tammuz. Assur may even have been the capital of its own semi-autonomous or vassal state, either under the suzerainty of the largely Assyrian populated Kingdom of Hatra, or under direct Parthian suzerainty. Though this second golden age of Assur came to an end with the conquest, sack and destruction of the city by the Sasanian Empire c. AD 240–250, the inscriptions, temples, continued celebration of festivals and the wealth of theophoric elements (divine names) in personal names of the Parthian period illustrate a strong continuity of traditions dating back to circa 21st century BC, and that the most important deities of old Assyria were still worshipped at Assur and elsewhere more than 800 years after the Assyrian Empire had been destroyed. The cultural and historical memory of Assyria endured within Babylonia, and Assyrian scholarship impacted the Babylonian one. Assyrian personal names invoking Assur remained in use throughout Hellenistic Babylonia, with the families who bore them likely descending from Assyrians who had settled in the south. In Uruk, the cult of Assur survived, and certain temple priests carried names that included Assur. Cuneiform texts from the city preserved distinctly Assyrian and Ninevite literary traditions across various fields such as astrology, while some families even preserved ancient Assyrian cuneiform texts as heirlooms. Certain scholars in Hellenistic Uruk clearly cultivated an awareness of the Assyrian past and culture by such practices, and kept the memory of Assyria alive by preserving tales like that of Ahiqar, the sage of the Assyrian king Esarhaddon.

== Identity in ancient Assyria ==
=== Development and distinctions ===
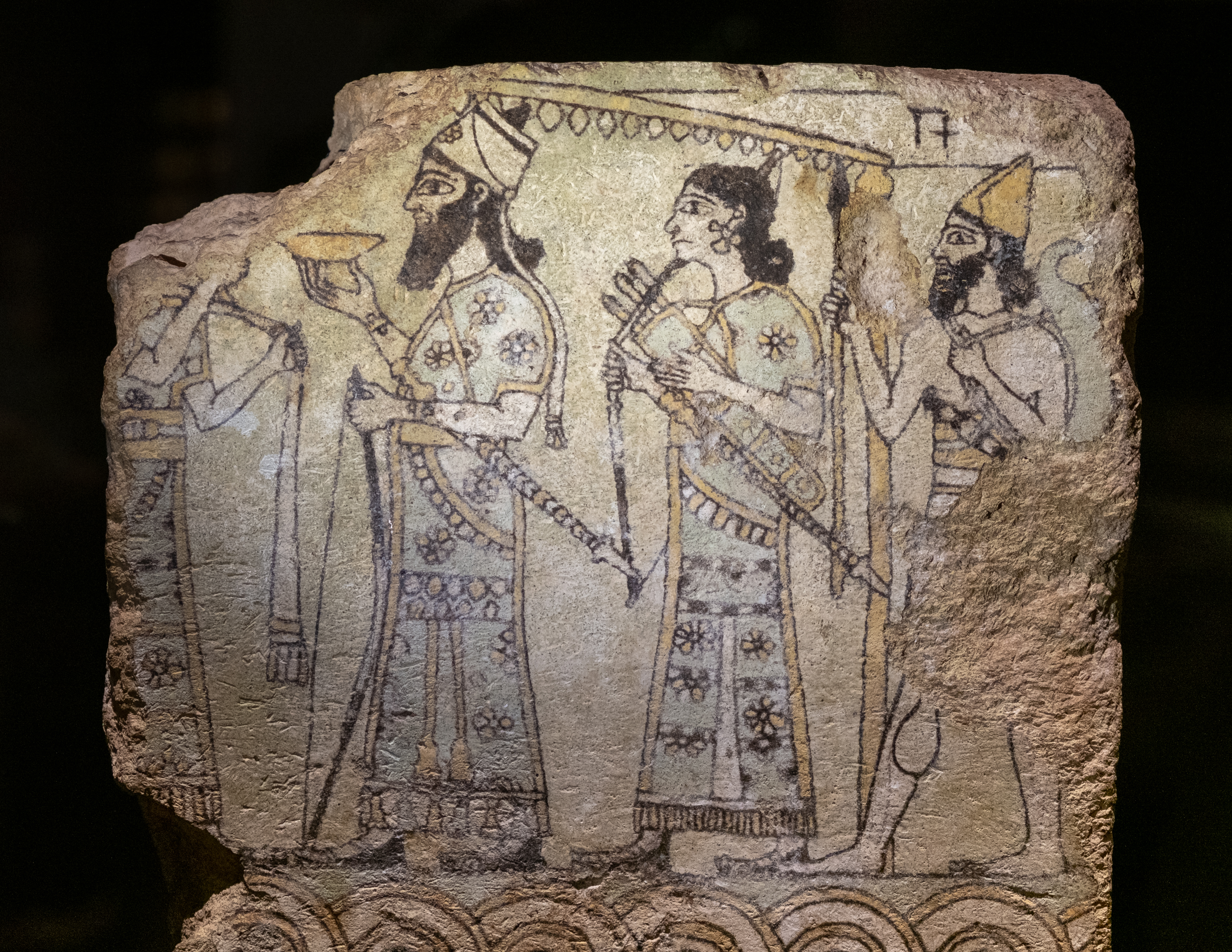
Glazed tile from Nimrud depicting a Neo-Assyrian king, accompanied by attendants

Ethnicity and culture are largely based in self-perception and self-designation. In ancient Assyria, a distinct Assyrian identity appears to have formed already in the Old Assyrian period (c. 2025–1364 BC), when distinctly Assyrian burial practices, foods and dress codes are attested and Assyrian documents appear to consider the inhabitants of Assur to be a distinct cultural group, even though they were ethnolinguistically identical to the Semites of Southern Mesopotamia (Babylonia). A wider Assyrian identity appears to have spread across northern Mesopotamia under the Middle Assyrian Empire (c. 1363–912 BC), since later writings concerning the reconquests of the early Neo-Assyrian kings refer to some of their wars as liberating the Assyrian people of the cities they reconquered. Though there for much of ancient Assyria's history existed a distinct Assyrian identity, Assyrian culture and civilization, like any other culture and civilization, did not develop in isolation. As the Assyrian Empire expanded and contracted, elements from regions the Assyrians conquered or traded with culturally influenced the Assyrian heartland and the Assyrians themselves. Early Assyrian culture was greatly influenced by the Hurrians and vice versa, a people that also lived in northern Mesopotamia, and by the culture of southern Mesopotamia, particularly that of Sumer and Babylonia.

Surviving evidence suggests that the ancient Assyrians had a relatively open definition of what it meant to be Assyrian. Modern ideas such as a person's ethnic background, or the Roman idea of legal citizenship, do not appear to have been reflected in ancient Assyria. Although Assyrian accounts and artwork of warfare frequently describe and depict foreign enemies, they are not usually depicted with different physical features, but rather with different clothing and equipment, though this may be more related to the fact Assyria mostly had contact with other societies in Western Asia, Anatolia, East Mediterranean, North Africa and Southern Caucasus where the people were likely similar physically to the Assyrians. Assyrian accounts describe enemies as barbaric only in terms of their behaviour, as lacking correct religious practices or being uncivilised, and as doing wrongdoings against Assyria. All things considered, there does not appear to have been any well-developed concepts of ethnicity or race in ancient Assyria. What mattered for a person to be seen by others as Assyrian was mainly fulfillment of obligations (such as military service), being affiliated with the Assyrian Empire politically, and maintaining loyalty to the Assyrian king; some kings, such as Sargon II (r. 722–705 BC), explicitly encouraged assimilation and mixture of foreign cultures with that of Assyria.

== Pre-modern self-identities ==
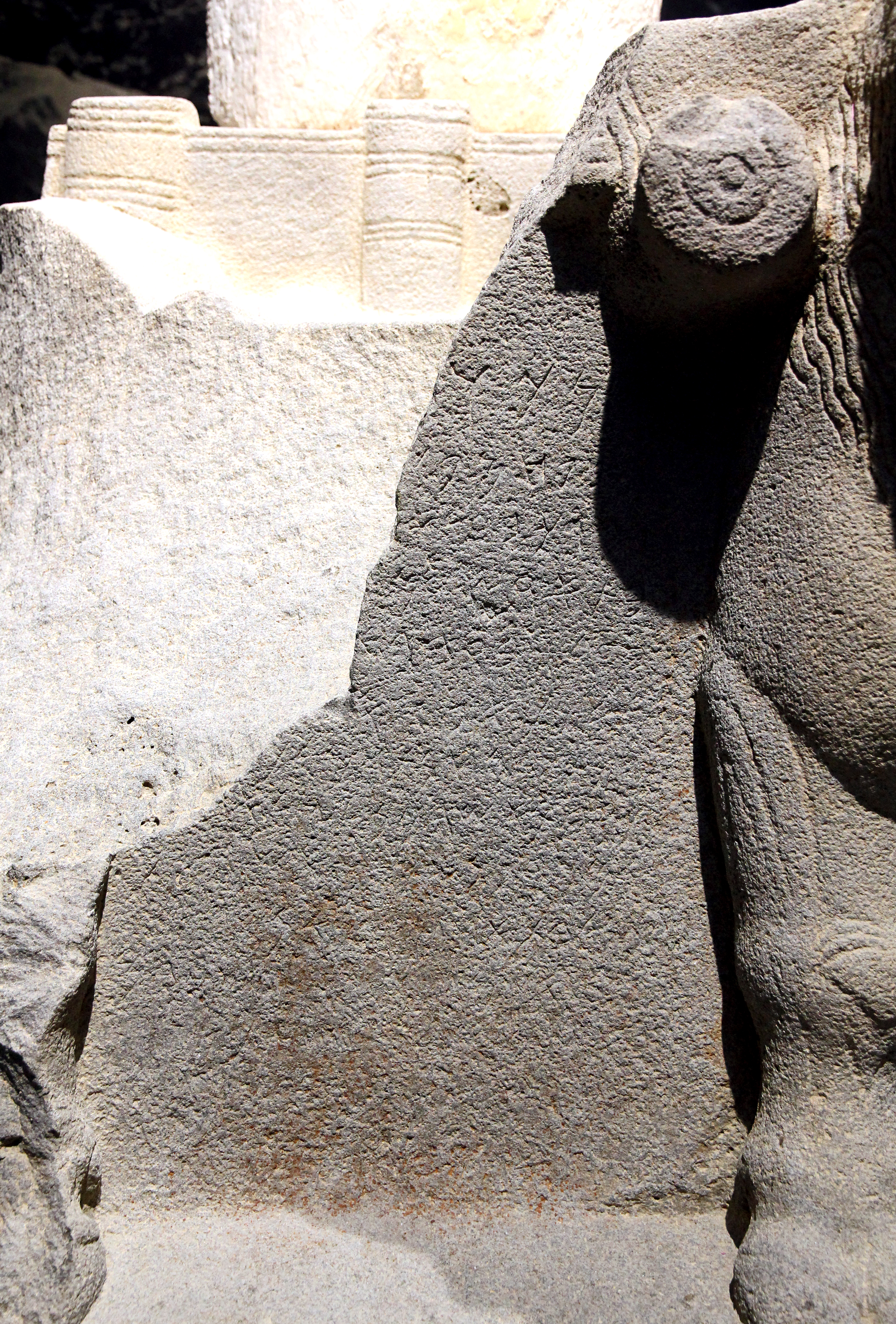
Photograph of a portion of the Çineköy inscription

Though many foreign states ruled over the Assyrian heartland in the millennia following the empire's fall, there is no evidence of any large scale influx of immigrants that replaced the original population, which instead continued to make up a significant portion of the region's people until Mongol and Timurid massacres in the late 14th century. In pre-modern ecclesiastical Syriac-language (the type of Aramaic used in Christian Mesopotamian writings) sources, the typical self-designations used is suryāyā (as well as the shortened surayā), and sometimes ʾāthorāyā ("Assyrian") and ʾārāmāyā ("Aramaic" or "Aramean"). A reluctance of the overall Christian population to adopt ʾĀthorāyā as a self-designation probably derives from Assyria's portrayal in the Bible. "Assyrian" (Āthorāyā) also continuously survived as the designation for a Christian from Mosul (ancient Nineveh) and Mesopotamia in general. It is clear from the surviving sources that ʾārāmāyā and suryāyā were not distinct and mutually exclusive identities, but rather interchangeable terms used to refer to the same people; the Syriac author Bardaisan (154–222) is for instance referred to in 4th-century Syriac translations of Eusebius's Church History as both ārāmāyā and suryāyā.

Sūryāyā, which also occurs in the forms sūrāyā and sūrōyō, though sometimes translated to "Syrian", was coined as a self-designation by Mesopotamian Christians in Edessa some time after the 5th century AD, quickly gaining widespread usage in both what would come to be called West and East Syriac traditions. This term ultimately derives from the ancient Akkadian term assūrāyu ("Assyrian"). Luwian and Aramaic texts from the time of the Neo-Assyrian Empire, such as the Çineköy inscription, sometimes use the shortened "Syria" for the Assyrian Empire. The consensus in modern academia is thus that "Syria" is simply a shortened form of "Assyria". The modern distinction between "Assyrian" and "Syrian" is the result of ancient Greek historians and cartographers, who designated the Levant as "Syria" and Mesopotamia as "Assyria". By the time the terms are first attested in Greek texts (in the 4th century BC), the local denizens in both the Levant and Mesopotamia had already long used both terms interchangeably for the entire region, and continued to do so well into the later Christian period. Whether the Greeks began referring to Mesopotamia as "Assyria" because they equated the region with the Assyrian Empire, long fallen by the time the term is first attested in Greek, or because they named the region after the people who lived there, the (As)syrians, is not known. It is known however, the Seleucid Greeks conceived that the Aramaic-speakers of the east were descended from the ancient Assyrians, an idea which the Seleucids borrowed from Classical Greeks, who deemed Assyrians and Syrians to be identical. Although the term "Syria" began to be confined to the region west of the Euphrates, the conflation of "Assyrian" and "Syrian" persisted, which is evident among certain communities well into the late medieval period. Even Josephus the Hebrew, who had a more unique stance on Syrian identity, perpetuated the traditions of Strabo and Herodotus which held Assyrians and Syrians to consisted of the same ethnos, mentioning the "Syrians" in Babylonia. This region was once under Assyria, and therefore Josephus followed the reasoning of Strabo, who argued that its inhabitants could be called "Assyrians" or "Syrians" interchangeably. Syrians in Roman Syria could also posit themselves as constituting the same ethnic group and heirs of an ancient legacy that their counterparts, the Assyrians in the Parthian and Sasanian kingdoms, claimed. Thus, those inhabiting Roman Syria could still envision the ancient Assyrians as their direct ethnic ancestors or at least the founders of their ethnos. In general, Syrians themselves adopted the Greek formulations that conceived of the Aramaic-speakers of the Near East as being descended from the Assyrians and understood their past through it. In doing so, they came to see themselves as an ethnic group. Hence, from the 1st and 2nd centuries CE, authors from Roman Syro-Mesopotamia, such as Tatian and Lucian, writing in Greek and Aramaic, extensively used the Assyrian past to define their communities in relation to the Greeks and Romans and bore their self-ascriptions as "Syrian" and "Assyrian" with significance. Tatian and Lucian designated themselves as Assýrios not only to denote Syrian origin, but to stress a native cultural identity in contrast with Greek. As expressed by the writer Meleager of Gadara, Syrians, it seems, came from Assyria. Furthermore, although the Seleucids emphasized their Macedonian origins and implemented a policy of Hellenization upon the inhabitants of the Near East whom they ruled over, they eventually began to assimilate into the native Assyrian population of Mesopotamia and adopt their customs, coming to be seen by their contemporaries and even themselves as the heirs of the Neo-Assyrian empire and dynasty. The (As)Syrians too came to see the Seleucids as the successors of Assyria, counting them in continuity with Semiramis and Sardanapalus, thereby Assyrianizing them. The Roman historian Titus Livius particularly captures this process of Greek assimilation into the native populations when he laments that the Macedonians who settled within Mesopotamia have "degenerated into Syrians". Semiramis herself also gained popularity in the East, with women in Mesopotamia bearing her name. Although the Greek provides the basis for the modern tale, the earliest forms of the Saga likely derived from perishable Aramaic sources in the Levant and Mesopotamia, as the tale displays Akkadian influences.

Although suryāyā is thus clearly connected to "Assyrian," the more prevalent term for ancient Assyrians, ʾāthorāyā is not the typical self-designation in pre-modern sources. Syriac sources did however prominently use ʾāthorāyā in other contexts, particularly in relation to ancient Assyria. Ancient Assyria was typically referred to as ʾāthor, which also survived as a designation for the region surrounding its last great capital, Nineveh. The reluctance of Medieval Syriac Christians to use ʾāthorāyā as a self-designation could perhaps be explained by the Assyrians described in the Bible being prominent enemies of Israel; the term ʾāthorāyā was sometimes employed in Syriac writings as a term for enemies of Christians. In this context, the term was sometimes applied to the Persians of the Sasanian Empire; the 4th-century Syriac writer Ephrem the Syrian for instance referred to the Sasanian Empire as "filthy ʾāthor, mother of corruption". In a similar fashion, the term in this context was also sometimes applied to the later Muslim rulers. Though not used by the overall Syriac-speaking community in the Middle Ages, the term ʾāthorāyā did survive as a self-identity throughout the period as it was the typically used designation for a Syriac Christian from Mosul (ancient Nineveh) and its vicinity. While terms like Assyrian, Babylonian, and Aramean became associated with paganism and their use declined, positive references to Assyrian heritage of Syriac Christians can still be found, for instance, in the writings of Abdisho of Nisibis who took a contrary view. The older association of Assyria with the Aramaic-speaking homeland persisted however, and some Syriac intellectuals continued to use "Assyria" and "Assyrians" to refer to their land and people. Despite this, most Syriac Christians primarily identified themselves by village or religion, as was customary in the Middle East. Although terms like Nineveh, Assyria, and Babylon would have been known through biblical texts, Syriac authors likely instead drew on inherited traditions and an awareness of these regions as their ancestral lands for their usage, favoring such antique designations over more contemporary terms. The use of terms such as ʾāthor and ʾāthorāyā points to, at the very least, a recognition of the ancient Assyrians, and to an awareness among Syriac Christians of northern Mesopotamia of their impact on the region, which they had once made the center of their empire.

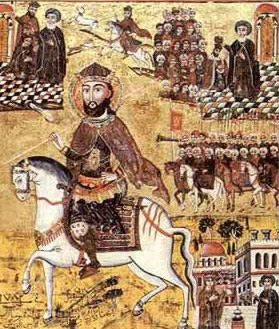
A medieval icon depicting Saints Behnam, Sarah, and the Forty Martyrs; their legend prominently incorporates the ancient Assyrian king Sennacherib

Pre-modern Syriac-language sources at times identified positively with the ancient Assyrians, with the regional population keeping the memory of Assyria alive in the local Syriac histories of the Sasanian period, drawing connections between the ancient empire and themselves. Most prominently, ancient Assyrian kings and figures long appeared in local folklore and literary tradition and claims of descent from ancient Assyrian royalty were forwarded both for figures in folklore and by actual living high-ranking members of society in northern Mesopotamia. Figures like Sargon II, Sennacherib (r. 705–681 BC), Esarhaddon (r. 681–669 BC), Ashurbanipal and Shamash-shum-ukin long figured in local folklore and literary tradition. In large part, tales from the Sasanian period and later times were invented narratives, based on ancient Assyrian history but applied to local and current landscapes. Medieval tales written in Syriac, such as that of Behnam, Sarah, and the Forty Martyrs, for instance by and large characterize Sennacherib as an archetypical pagan king assassinated as part of a family feud, whose children convert to Christianity. The appearance of Sennacherib in this story is not strange, as many Syriac sources from late antiquity and the early medieval period refer to both him and the Assyrians, usually with the goal of portraying Syriac Christians as the heirs of an Assyrian past. The story is, however, unique in portraying the Assyrian king as the father of the two martyrs. Sennacherib also appears in the Sasanian period stories of Mar Awgin, Mar Qardagh, Mar Mattai, and Mar Behnam. Although these stories often confused his figure, they likely relied upon inherited local traditions as well as the Bible for their memory of this king.

The 7th-century Assyrian History of Mar Qardagh made the titular saint, Mar Qardagh, out to be a descendant of the legendary Biblical Mesopotamian king Nimrod and the historical Sennacherib, with his illustrious descent manifesting in Mar Qardagh's mastery of archery, hunting and polo. A sanctuary constructed for Mar Qardagh during this time was built directly on top of the ruins of a Neo-Assyrian temple. The legendary figure Nimrod, otherwise traditionally viewed as simply Mesopotamian, is explicitly referred to as Assyrian in many of the Sasanian-period texts and is inserted into the line of Assyrian kings. Nimrod, as well as other legendary Mesopotamian (though explicitly Assyrian in the texts) rulers, such as Belus and Ninus, sometimes play significant roles in the writings. Certain Christian texts considered the Biblical figure Balaam to have prophesied the Star of Bethlehem; a local Assyrian version of this narrative appears in some Syriac-language writings from the Sasanian period, which allege that Balaam's prophecy was remembered only through being transmitted through the ancient Assyrian kings. In some stories, explicit claims of descent are made. According to the 6th-century History of Karka, twelve of the noble families of Karka (ancient Arrapḫa) were descendants of ancient Assyrian nobility who lived in the city during the time of Sargon II. The goal of this specific Syriac text was to demonstrate that the past continued to the present without break, and hence, it begins with the pious king Sargon, who built the city and enacted the fast of Ninevites, and ends with the Assyrian martyrs who made it a blessed field for Christianity. Later on, the bishop of Karka d-Bet Selok, who was influenced by this story, Sabrisho, implemented the Fast of the Ninevites in efforts to act like the righteous king Sargon, who was the first to listen to Jonah's message. With this, the story of Jonah acted as a way to link Syriac Christians with a local Assyrian past. Generally, Syriac Christians of northern Mesopotamia were fascinated with the story of Jonah, and some Syriac works implied that the Ninevites, their alleged Assyrian ancestors, were the first Gentile converts to Christianity, as Jonah prefigured Christ. As the biblical story and fast held particular importance within both the East and West Syriac traditions, only later spreading to other churches through patriarchs of Assyrian origin, it implies that Syriac Christians believed it referred to their own ancestors. Accordingly, Ephrem, although he portrays the Assyrians negatively in other works, praises the inhabitants of Nineveh and the Assyrian king at his repentance, presenting the Assyrians as a penitent people in contrast to the Israelites who are cast as arrogant.

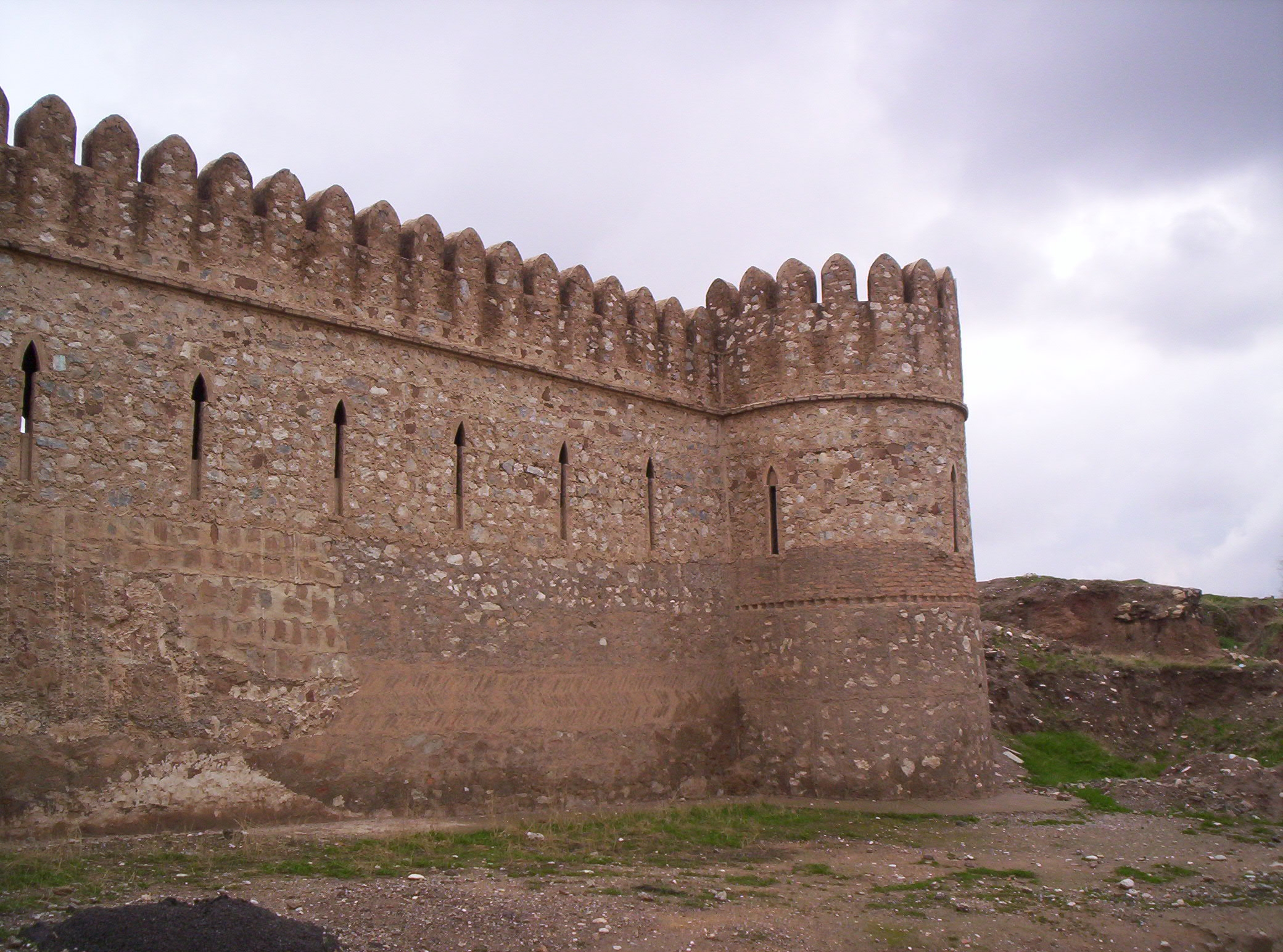
Citadel of Karka d-Bet Selok (Kirkuk) in modern day Iraq

To account for the appearance of Assyrian figures like Sennacherib and Esarhaddon in these Syriac texts, scholars have argued that oral, folkloric memories of the ancient Assyrians continued in regions such as Arbela, Nineveh, and Assur. Thus, although the Assyrian state collapsed, the memories of such ancient kings loomed large in the Assyrian heartland, and ruins in the region were attributed to ancient Assyrians. In places such as Nisibis, Arbela, and Karka d-Bet Selokh, these ruins of old encouraged links between the Syriac Christians and the ancient Assyrians, causing distant antiquity and Christian martyrdom to form the basis for the developed histories of these areas. Local communities in northern Mesopotamia commemorated the memory of a great past they called ʾāthor (Assyria), with Syriac Christians recognizing such ruins as the works of their ancestors, even if the exact historical details of the empire had been forgotten. Pagan rituals and rites of Assyrian origin also continued to be practiced deep into late antiquity, likely connecting their practitioners to a distant past through stories and ideas that were passed down. Syriac authors acknowledged this tradition and reinforced these ideas with validity by creating new Christian literary narratives in a landscape already rich with meaning. The Christianized inhabitants of Assyria and Babylonia during the 3rd and 4th centuries were largely the same pagan population of the Assyro-Babylonian empires and were the successors of this cultural background. In keeping with this background, they developed a personal approach to their Christian faith, retaining some knowledge from their past, particularly Assyrian traditions. So when Christianity spread to Adiabene, church leaders purposely suppressed some customs continuing from Assyria's imperial period, but at the same time, they integrated memories of Assyria into their emerging stories with the goal of forging a Christian identity compatible with local traditions. Although most Syriac authors were uninterested in nations without relevance to biblical accounts, local Syriac histories and hagiographies preserved garbled accounts of Assyrian city foundations and the ancestry of social elites, likely being derived from oral tradition rather than written sources. According to East Syrian synodical documents, Assyria was transformed into an archdiocese, and its bishop of Adiabene centered in Arbel, bore the title "Metropolitan of the Assyrians." The archbishopric of Adiabene, in this context should be understood in its Hellenic and Parthian boundaries, which extended to the Khabur River, and not the region only between the Greater and Lesser Zab. Hence, by late antiquity, Syriac-speaking authors in Adiabene were positing that they, as Assyrians, were descended from the ancient Assyrians. A reason as to why the term "Syrian" as a self-identity is not explicitly found within these texts is possibly due to the Syrians being seen as meek people in the Sasanian regions, and thus it is unsurprising that these hagiographers sometimes avoided the term. Syriac Christians who lived within metropolitan regions of Beth Garmai, Adiabene, and Mosul of northern Mesopotamia often turned to the Assyrian past to narrate themselves as its heirs in their efforts to include themselves in the political spheres of the Sasanian empire and to present themselves as the natives of the land, descending from a distinctly Assyrian population, in contrast with their fellow Zoroastrians. Survival of references to ancient Assyria in late antique and medieval Syriac sources are common, with Fergus Millar noting that Syriac Christians who lived in what was once ancient Assyria did not suffer a 'historical amnesia,' retaining awareness of their Assyrian origins and the history of their native region. Comparative to southern Mesopotamia, which felt no connection with Babylonian continuity, the Christians of northern Mesopotamia employed the terms Assyria and Assyrians to identify themselves and developed notions that they were connected to the Assyrians of antiquity through various tales. The hagiography of Mar Qardagh reveals the outlook of a writer who considered the nobles of Adiabene to be of a local Assyrian origin, and the story of Mor Behnam serves to assign Syriac Christians origins more deeply into antiquity, connecting them with the ancient Assyrians. Syriac writers institutionalized narratives of Christianized Assyrians like those of Behnam, Qardagh, and Karka d'Bet-Selok into their collective memory of the Assyrian past to self-fashion themselves as a Christianized Assyrian people, placing the ancient Assyrians at the center of their region's communal history above even the Seleucids and Persians. These tales and their accompanying festivals were also read and practiced annually by both elites and commoners to celebrate and honor such martyrs. As a result, Christianized Assyrians and Assyria remained prominent in Syriac Christian communities well into the Medieval Ages and beyond, serving as a living link to their ancestry. When retold they fostered a sense of belonging for Syriac Christians to an ancient past, intertwined with Assyria, and served to strengthen the identity of their community by emphasizing their distinctiveness and forming a link to antiquity. Notably, the hagiographers of legends as those of Behnam and Qardagh felt the need to include their Assyrian ancestry, when their Zoroastrian background alone would have sufficed. These Assyrian martyrs were considered by the Syriac authors of their tales to be the true children of the ancient Mesopotamians. Qardagh's hagiography and his recognition as an Assyrian plays a key role in defining the identity of the Church of the East, which, by at least the seventh century, openly professed its Assyrian heritage. The memory of Assyria and of its rulership was not only alive, but used by the Church of the East as an identity marker in a Zoroastrian milieu.

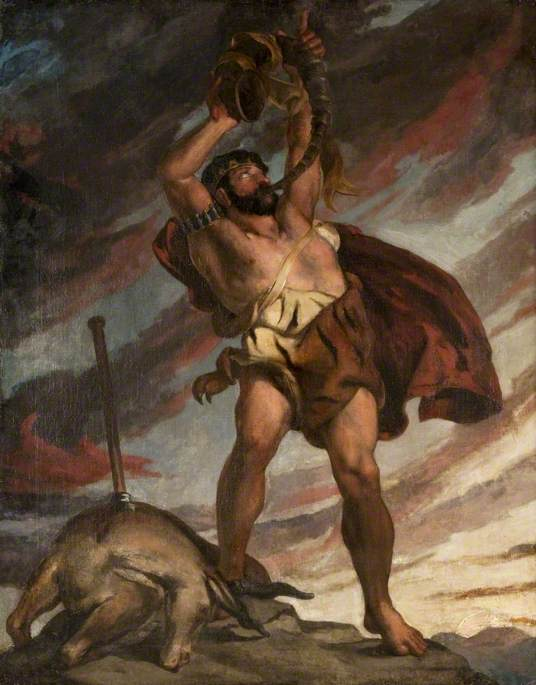
Painting of the Mesopotamian king Nimrod

The biblical king Nimrod is also of great importance for the identity formation among both East and West Syrians. Several Syriac writers hold a positive view of him, and despite Nimrod being overwhelmingly considered a depraved figure in other Christian literature, the Syriac tradition holds a confident view of him. Some of those who purported this image included, but were not limited to, Ephrem the Syrian, Jacob Serugh, and Narsai. Although some have suggested this positive view derives from a defunct, unwritten, Jewish tradition in Mesopotamia, this is hardly a viable theory. The development of this position on Nimrod appears to be an internal development within the Syriac and a form of local patriotism by Syriac Christians, and it is because Nimrod had become a cultural hero and a foundational figure among the Christians of upper Mesopotamia that they supplanted the negative view of him for a positive one. The biblical foundations that Nimrod created in Genesis 10:10-12 were associated with the important urban centers of northern Mesopotamia, such as Nisibis and Edessa, by these authors. His unusual role as a positive foundational figure contributed to a sense of a "Syrian" ethnicity and played a significant role in their supposed claims of descent. The position Nimrod played in creating a distinctive identity for Syriac Christians in Mesopotamia also finds appeals to him as a direct ancestral figure. The fact that the inhabitants of this geographical area considered themselves to be Nimrod's descendants is perhaps expressed most vividly in the Acts of Mar Mari, whose author declares the Syriac Christians within the region as "The sons of the powerful Nimrod" (bnay Nemrud gabārā). Further, Catholicos Timothy I brought up Nimrod in one of his letters to claim him as the ancestor of the Syriac Christians and, in doing so, positioned himself as Nimrod's heir. Syriac Christians also bore the name of Nimrod himself. Due being the first earthly ruler, Nimrod was frequently identified with the mythical Assyrian king Ninus by Jacob of Edessa and many other Syriac writers. Likewise, Ephrem also declares the ancient Assyrians to be "the race of Nimrod." Ephrem in particular seems to stress the importance of his region and its connection with Nimrod, identifying him with the northern Mesopotamian territories and ascribing his biblical foundations to known cities in the region. This is perhaps one of the signs of an ethnic community, being geography and a link to a territory, but at least, his positive view of Nimrod, who reigned in his own land, is conspicuous. In general, the foundation of cities by various civic developers such as Nimrod, Belus, Semiramis, and Belochus all appear within the Syriac literature. The northern Mesopotamian Christian centers being founded by various Assyrian and Babylonian figures was interwoven into the writing of multiple Syriac writers potentially in efforts to boost their national identity, ascertaining to a form of nationalism, as these were some of the most important sites for Syriac Christianity. Syriac authors endowed Nimrod with a positive image, and the cities he established were replaced by cities familiar to them in northern and southern Mesopotamia. He was recast from a biblical figure into a founding hero, coming to embody a memory of the local Mesopotamian past for Syriac Christians.

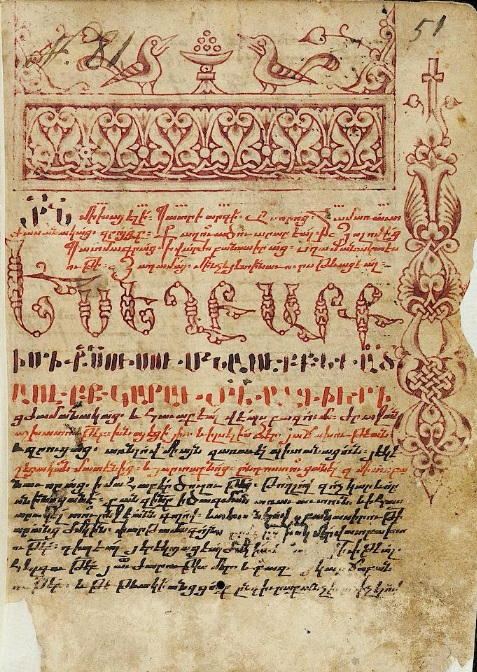
The Armenian translation of Michael the Syrian's world Chronicle

Among West Syrians, the results of the Leiden project have argued that the Syriac Orthodox have been continuously reconstructing their past since their inception as a Christian community in hopes of legitimizing their existence as a distinct group. As Syriac became a symbol of religious recognition and also a primary feature of an ethnic community, it allowed Syriac Christians to turn to an ancient past in hopes of defining themselves. They reasoned that the Assyrians and Babylonians spoke Syriac, which was Aramaic, and hence they were a part of the Syrian people. This is a process of social identity construction, and one should not think of ancient fault lines here. Therefore, some Syrians, including those in the Syriac Orthodox tradition, eventually ethnicized their confessional identity and linked themselves to the ancient ethnonym "Assyrian" in their historiographical traditions, with certain scholars having demonstrated that the medieval Syriac Orthodox patriarchate portrayed the ancient Assyrians as the ancestors of the Christians of northern Mesopotamia. This idea started as early as Severus Sebokht, who marked astronomy as one of the cornerstones of civilization and who identified the ancient peoples of modern-day Iraq as suryāyē (Syrians) in his discourse against the Greeks. Severus invoked this continuity in efforts to disprove claims of Greek superiority. Jacob of Edessa, Severus's disciple, also stressed that the Assyrian kings, or synonymously, Chaldean kings, were the ancestors of the Syrians and that they belonged to "our tongue." Jacob also aimed to prove, according to the Greek books, that "empires arose from our people more powerful than all the empires of their times." Later on, Dionysius, inspired by Jacob's arguments, also wrote about the identity of the Syrians. He used the Old Testament to demonstrate that the Syrians were a people with a prestigious history and many kings in Damascus, Babylonia, Assyria, and Edessa. He aimed to demonstrate a continuous existence of a Syrian empire, and thus considered the Assyrians and Chaldeans as belonging to the people of the Syrians, this empire only disappearing when Cyrus put an end to it. Dionysius's conception of a Syrian identity was rooted in territory, language, and history of kingship. His arguments paved the way for other Syriac authors to form their own ethnic arguments, like Michael. Dionysius also recognized that the Syrians east of the Euphrates were termed such in a metaphorical way, and that they held the kings of Assyria, Babylon and Edessa, also believing these Syrians were Mesopotamians, distinct from those in Syria proper which was the west of the Euphrates and held the Aramean kingdoms. His passage was directed at those who claimed the Syrians had no kings. The sense of a Syrian identity dating back to antiquity based on language is notably expressed by Michael, who counted 194 kings for the Syrians, including the Assyrians and Babylonians within this list. For him, the Aramaic language was the common connection between the Babylonians, Assyrians, and the various Aramean principalities. It was a tool for him to prove the historical identity of the Syrians against his opponents, who claimed the Syrians had no kings. However, this does not mean that Michael's views of the Syriac Orthodox was not ethnic. In fact, language is used to prove common descent. Michael recognized that both the Arameans and Assyrians were called Syrians and that they were both the forebearers of the Syriac tradition, but distinguished them. The "Syrians" east of the Euphrates were called such metaphorically and were putatively descended from the Assyrians and Babylonians. Despite the prominence of Edessa, he continued to maintain that the Syrians, in the proper sense, were most specifically those west of the Euphrates who traced descent from the Arameans. Previous writers of Syriac were already aware of the interchangeability of the terms "Aramean," "Syrian," and "Assyrian," and even of "Assyria" with "Aram." However, the equation of the three terms was precisely the point that Michael Rabo strenuously argued for in his appendix against the Greeks. He harmonized existing arguments about the Syrians and succeeded in identifying them with Aramean and Assyrian history. Michael also offers a passage where he assimilates the terms "Assyrian" and "Syrian" with each other while enumerating nations which developed a writing system. This passage is believed to derive from an earlier lost work of an anonymous Syriac writer during the reign of Abd al-Malik, who copied Hippolytus's list of literate peoples and equated the Syrians with the Assyrians in his list of the sons of Shem, an idea that later influenced eight other East and West Syriac authors in their versions. Within the Syriac tradition, the Assyrians of Hippolytus's list are replaced by their equivalent, the Syrians. The Chronicle of 1234 further shares many similarities with Michael's list, the most significant being is that both Syriac witnesses equate the Assyrians to the Syrians while mentioning those people who are literate in the world. A sense of continuity between the Aramaic and Semitic-speakers of the ancient Near East and those of the Late Antique and Medieval Near East would also continue after Michael, such as in Bar Hebraeus's Chronicle. His source, Michael, had identified both the Assyrians and Arameans as the ancestors of the Syrians, grouping them under the term "Chaldean." Bar Hebraeus removed the difficulties in the identification of the old Mesopotamians and uses the term "ancient Syrians," which included ancient speakers of Aramaic from Syria, Assyria, and Babylon. He explicitly identifies the Chaldean kings with these ancient Syrians, terming them such. Bar Hebraeus connected the Syriac Orthodox to the Ancient Near Eastern Empires using neutral terms like "ancient Syrians" and "our Syrians" to avoid the debate about the "true Syrians" discussed by Michael. Patriarch Philoxenus I Nemrud and his cousin, the priest Nebuchadnezzar, had names that harkened back to the ancient Assyrian and Babylonian kings. These choices were certainly inspired by Michael's historical vision, which held the ancient Mesopotamians to be Syrians. The name of king Sargon is also attested in Syriac Christians from the 7th century onwards, appearing in the personal names of a priest named Sargon and another, Autel, son of Sargon. The father of John of Damascus, Sarjun Ibn Mansur, was also titled after the ancient king. Likewise with the names Nemrud and Nebuchadnezzar, these were likely attempts to link themselves with a pre-Christian Assyrian past. According to the Syriac interpretation of ancient history, centered on the belief that powerful "Syrian" kingdoms existed on both sides of the Euphrates and that the Syriac Orthodox had their own sovereign kings, which aimed to defend the Syriacs by emphasizing the importance of the kingdoms that arose from them, as presented by Jacob, Dionysius, and Michael, the Seleucids were likewise regarded as local Syrian kings in the ancient sense of the word. Since Alexander conquered Persia, which had previously conquered the Mesopotamian kingdoms that these authors referred to as "Syrian" kingdoms, the Seleucids were viewed as restorers of local Syrian royalty. Therefore, they were regarded as "Syrians" by Syriac authors who aimed to demonstrate their historical heritage. Alexander, although Greek, was considered native. This explains the development of a hybrid Syrian identity based on the usage of Aramaic but marked by Greek culture. Claims of an autonomous past for Syrians, like those made by Dionysius Telmahroyo, seem to have been accepted by Arab authors, particularly Masudi, who mentions that the kings of Nineveh and Mosul were Syrians, a point which Michael would have agreed on. They had now constituted a nation, analogous to the Romans, Arabs, and Persians in his view. Both the Assyrian and Aramean pasts furnished Syriac Christians with ancestral narratives that could define them as linguistically, territorially, or theologically legible to more powerful audiences. The Aramean past offered a spatial orientation to the west in Syria, while the Assyrian past offered a link to Mesopotamia eastward. Thus, Syriac-speaking authors, both Syriac Orthodox and from the Church of the East, considered themselves not the stock of conquered peoples but of empire builders and great victors. This was a process that gradually crystallized based on available sources of their time, but by at least the 12th century, the Syriac Orthodox were aware of having a core composed of the cultural traditions of the Assyrians and Arameans.

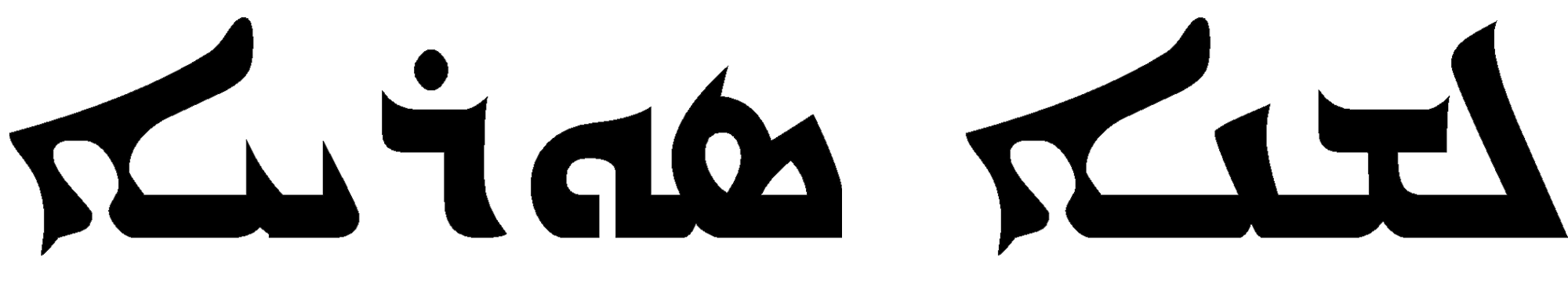
The Classical Syriac language

Michael was the first writer to acknowledge community on a larger scale, counting East Syrians as part of his people. Theologically, he distinguished his community from the East Syrians, but in times of hardship, he grouped West and East Syrians all under the ethnic term "Syrian." East Syrian pre-Christian history and early Christian history were treated as the history of his own community by Michael, and he reflects a conscious group identity with East Syrians based on common name, ancestry, memories, language, regional culture, and to an extent, also a common homeland and solidarity between the two groups. Michael's predecessors also acknowledged linguistic unity and at times shared cultural elements between both Syrian groups, but they were less pronounced ideas compared to Michael. This idea of unity with East Syrians was also expressed by Dionysius of Tel Mahre, although to a lesser extent, who became aware of a homeland and started to look for a common name. Dionysius represents the final phase of a gradual development to a common community. Various Syriac sources also indicate that East and West Syrians lived in the same regions and cities, in fact, there was also an increase in contact and shared use between the two groups literary traditions. Eliya of Nisibis for example, used West Syrian sources, and this exchange of knowledge can be seen in various genres of Syriac literature. Bar Ebroyo, too, considered East Syrians to be of the same people as his community. He clearly indicated that anyone who speaks or spoke Aramaic belonged to his community, with his homeland being Mesopotamia, including the region east of the Tigris. In this way, Bar Ebroyo tactically included East Syrians in his general "Syrian" terminology and even dedicated a section in his works to mentioning the patriarchs of the Church of the East.

== Modern identity and nationalism ==
=== 19th century identities and developments ===
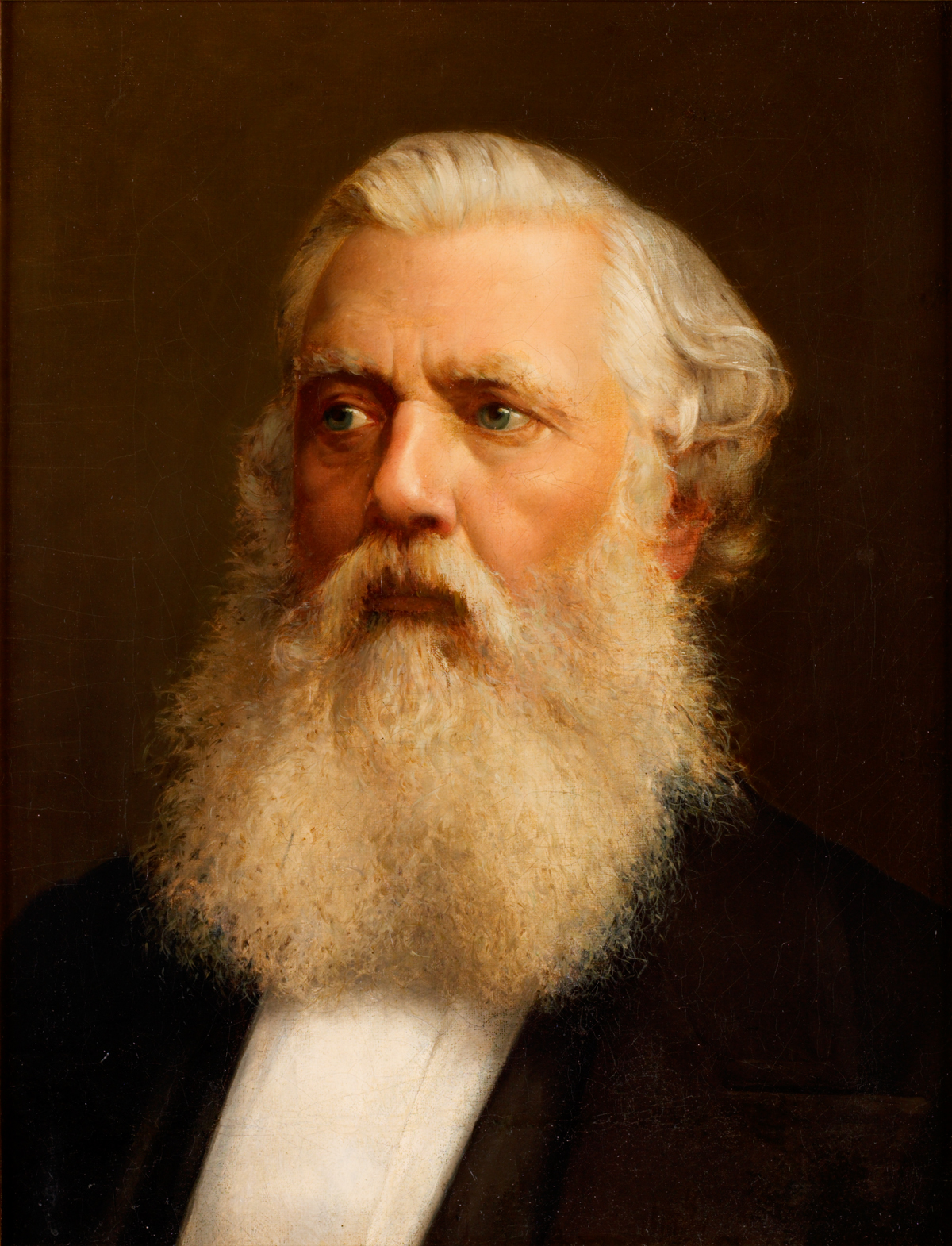
Austen Henry Layard (1817–1894), credited with the popularization of Assyrian continuity in western academia

Early travellers and missionaries in northern Mesopotamia in the 19th century observed connections between the indigenous Christian population and the ancient Assyrians. The British traveller Claudius Rich (1787–1821) referenced "Assyrian Christians" in Narrative of a Residence in Koordistan and on the site of Ancient Nineveh (published posthumously in 1836, though describing an 1820 journey). It is just possible that Rich considered "Assyrian" a geographic, rather than ethnic, term since he in a footnote on the same page also referenced the "Christians of Assyria". More clear-cut evidence of Assyrian self-identity in the 19th century can be seen in the writings of the American missionary Horatio Southgate (1812–1894). In Southgate's Narrative of a Visit to the Syrian [Jacobite] Church of Mesopotamia (1844) he remarked with surprise that Armenians referred to the Syriac Christians as Assouri, which Southgate associated with the English "Assyrians", rather than Syriani, which he himself had been using. It seems that the Assyrian identification had been in use for several decades before Layard's excavation, such as in Kharput, but also even the Syriac Orthodox Church in Constantinople bore the name "Assyrian Orthodox" as early as 1844. Early Jacobites found it conventional to use the English "Assyrian" to translate emic sūryōyō and its equivalents in other languages. Armenian and Georgian sources have since antiquity consistently referred to Assyrians as Assouri or Asori, with Armenian Christian literature in particular often referring to Syriac as "Assyrian". Southgate also mentioned that the Syriac Christians themselves at this point claimed origin from the ancient Assyrians as "sons of Assour". Southgate's account thus demonstrates that modern Assyrians still claimed ancient Assyrian descent already in the early 19th century, a period prior to the great archaeological discoveries of the mid to late 19th century. Despite the survival of Assyrian self-ascription among some villages in the Syriac Orthodox heartland, even in areas that had never encountered missionaries or archeologists, the majority identified primarily as sūryōye.

Connections between the modern population and ancient Assyrians were further popularized in the west and academia by the British archaeologist and traveller Austen Henry Layard (1817–1894), responsible for the early excavations of several major ancient Assyrian sites, such as Nimrud. In Nineveh and its Remains (1849), Layard argued that the Christians he met in northern Mesopotamia and southeast Anatolia claimed to be "descendants of the ancient Assyrians". It is possible that Layard's knowledge of them as such derived from his partnership with the local Assyrian archaeologist Hormuzd Rassam (1826–1910).

Towards the end of the 19th century, a so-called "religious renaissance" or "awakening" took place in Urmia, Iran. Perhaps partly encouraged by Anglican, Roman Catholic and Russian Orthodox missionary efforts, the concepts of nation and nationalism were introduced to the Assyrians in Urmia, who began to revive the term ʾāthorāyā as a self-identity, and began building a national ideology more heavily based around ancient Assyria than Christianity. This was not an isolated phenomenon: Middle Eastern nationalism, probably influenced by developments in Europe, also began to be strongly expressed in other communities during this time, such as among the Armenians, Arabs, Kurds, Pontic Greeks, Maronites, Jews and Turks. This time also saw the development of Literary Urmia Aramaic, a new literary language based on the at the time spoken Neo-Aramaic dialects. Through the promotion of an identity rooted in ancient Assyria, various communities could transcend their denominational differences and unite under one national identity. Overall, the connection to the Assyrians of antiquity was certainly stimulated by ancient traditions in Syriac literature which linked the Syrians with the empires of biblical times, that of the Assyrians and Babylonians.

=== Contemporary identities and name debate ===
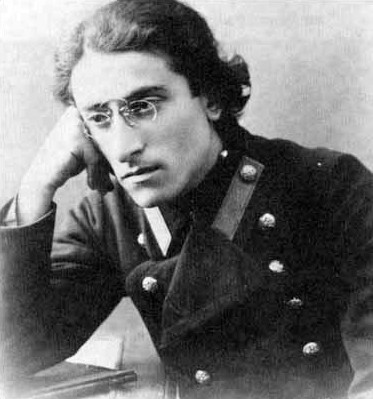
Freydun Atturaya (1891–1926), a prominent early Assyrian nationalist

In the years before World War I, several prominent East Aramaic-language authors and intellectuals promoted Assyrian nationalism. Among them were Freydun Atturaya (1891–1926), who in 1911 published an influential article titled Who are the Syrians [surayē]? How is Our Nation to Be Raised Up?, in which he pointed out the connection between surayē and "Assyrian" and argued for the adoption of ʾāthorāyā. Prominent Assyrian intellectuals across the three main religious denominations (Chaldean, Nestorian, Jacobite) advocated for a transformation of the meaning of "Assyrian" in the English language. The early 20th century saw an increase in the use of the term ʾāthorāyā as a self-identity. Also used as the neologism ʾasurāyā, perhaps inspired by the Armenian Asori. The adoption of ʾāthorāyā and a stronger association with ancient Assyria through nationalism is not a unique development in regard to the Assyrians. Greeks, for instance, due to associating the term "Hellene" with the pagan religion, overwhelmingly self-identified as Romans (Rhōmioi) up until nationalism around the time of the Greek War of Independence, when a more strong association with Ancient Greece spread among the populace. Today, sūryōyō or sūrāyā are the predominant self-designations used by Assyrians in their native language, though they are typically translated as "Assyrian" rather than "Syrian".

Today, as a consequence of World War I, the Sayfo (Assyrian genocide) and various other massacres, a majority of the Assyrians have been displaced from their homeland, and today they live in diaspora communities in countries such as Germany, Sweden, Denmark, the United Kingdom, Greece, Australia, New Zealand and the United States. In the aftermath of these events, explicit Assyrian self-identity became even more widespread and established in their communities, not only in order to unify communities in the diaspora (which often originated in different regions) but also because "Syrian" became internationally established as the demonym of the newly created country of Syria. Many Assyrians who were not members of the Assyrian Church of the East also embraced Assyrian nationalism, such as D. B. Perley (1901–1979), who in 1933 helped found the Assyrian National Federation and religiously identified himself as a Syriac Orthodox Christian but ethnically identified himself as an Assyrian. In 1935, Perley wrote that "The Assyrians, although representing but one single nation as the direct heirs of the ancient Assyrian Empire … are now doctrinally divided … No one can coherently understand the Assyrians as a whole until he can distinguish that which is religion or church from that which is nation …" and even proposed uniting all Assyrians under a single patriarch of the Church of the East.

For communities that identify themselves as Assyrian, Assyrian continuity forms a key part of their self-identity. Many modern Assyrians are named after ancient Mesopotamian figures, such as Sargon, Sennacherib and Nebuchadnezzar (and indeed many Assyrian family names still link to ancient Mesopotamian names), and the modern Assyrian flag displays symbolism which is derived from ancient Assyria. From the second half of the 20th century to the present, Assyrians, particularly in the diaspora, have continued to promote Assyrian nationalism as a unifying force among their people. Some denominational groups have opposed being lumped in as "Assyrians" and as a result, they have founded counter-movements of their own; the so-called "name debate" is still a hotly discussed topic within Syriac Christian communities today, especially in the diaspora which lives outside the Assyrian homeland. Modern international organizations generally do not recognize Assyrians, Syriacs, Arameans and Chaldeans as members of different ethnic groups, instead, they merely consider these names alternate names for Assyrians and numerous church leaders have also affirmed that they belong to the same ethnic group, albeit to different Christian denominations.

== Other forms of continuity ==
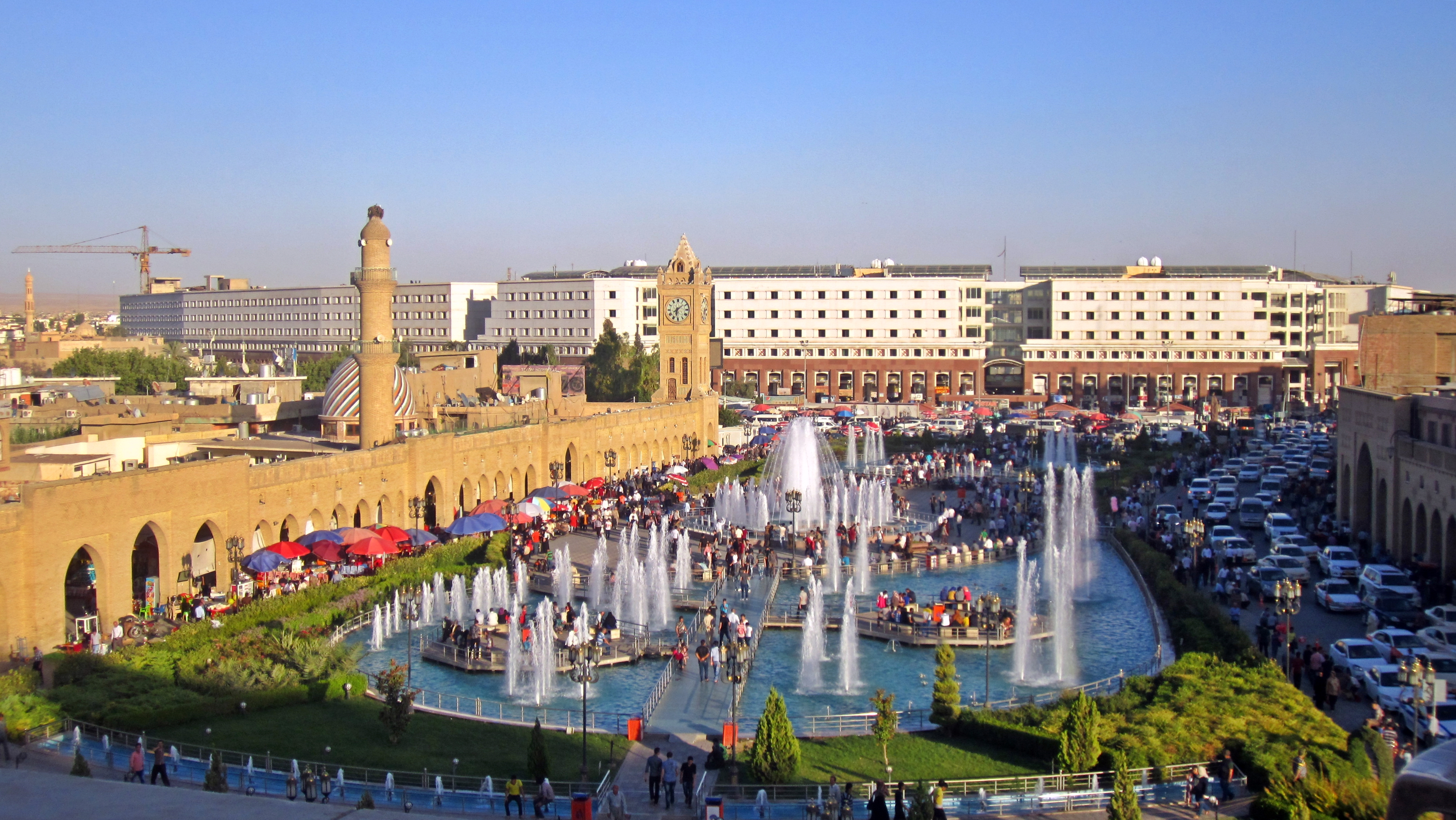
The city of Erbil (ancient Arbela), today the de facto capital of the autonomous Kurdistan Region in Iraq, has been continuously inhabited since the days of the Neo-Assyrian Empire

In addition to continuity in written record, self-designation and self-perception, there continued to be important continuities between ancient and contemporary Mesopotamia in terms of religion, literary culture and settlement well after the post-imperial period.

=== Assyrian settlements ===
Assyrian settlements continued to be occupied into the Christian period and through to the present day. The ancient capital of Nineveh, for instance, became the seat of a bishop, the Bishop of Nineveh, and a church (later converted to a mosque under Islamic rule) was built on top of the ruins of an ancient Assyrian palace. The main population center in the city gradually shifted to the opposite bank of the river, which became the city today known as Mosul; ancient Nineveh only gradually fell into ruin and eventually became open countryside. Though most of the old population centers were similarly gradually abandoned and fell into ruin some also endured. The ancient city of Arbela, today known as Erbil, has been continuously inhabited since the time of the Neo-Assyrian Empire.

=== Religion ===
Although the ancient Mesopotamian pantheon ceased to be worshipped in Assur and its surrounds with the city's destruction in the 3rd century AD, it persisted at other Assyrian localities, despite the overwhelming conversion of the region to Syriac Christianity, for much longer; the old faith persisted at Harran until at least the 10th century and at Mardin until as late as the 18th century.

Map of modern Assyrian Aramaic dialects

The Fast of Nineveh is a three-day fast commemorating the repentance of the Ninevites at the hands of Jonah and is found in all of the traditional churches of modern Assyrians, such as the Syriac Orthodox Church, Assyrian Church of the East and Chaldean Catholic Church. This fast is unique to the Assyrian Christian communities and connects Assyrians to their ancient heritage.

Nusardil (Feast of God) is another religious festival unique to Assyrians and found across all three churches and is usually celebrated in July. Following the holy mass, members of the community throw water at each other in an act of cleansing the path of God. This tradition likely finds its origins in ancient Assyrian and Mesopotamian rituals, such as the New Year. Such festivals, among others found locally in the Assyrian community, served to adapt to Christian needs yet also recall their ancient Assyrian heritage, acting as a link to a pre-Christian past. Certain Syriac religious works from the fourth or fifth century AD also drew on Assyro-Babylonian stories and fables, not found anywhere in other Christian texts, incorporating these concepts into their writings.

=== Language ===
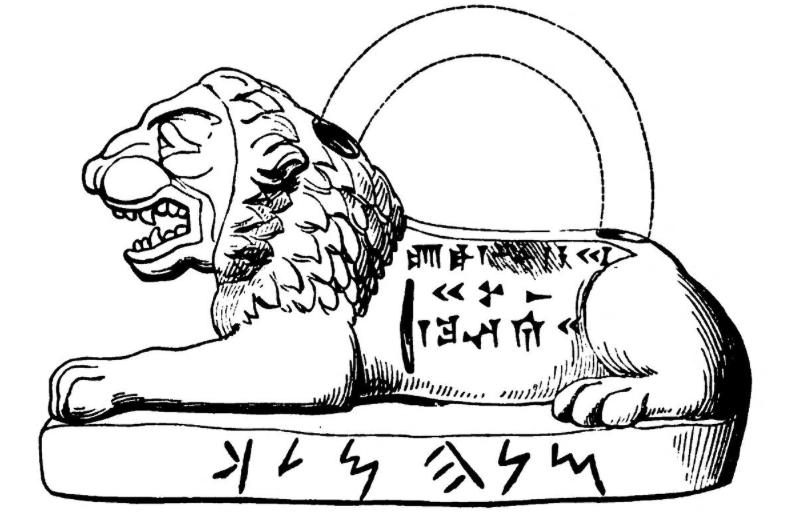
Line drawing of an Assyrian lion weight once belonging to the king Shalmaneser V (r. 727–722 BC). The weight is inscribed in both Akkadian and Aramaic.

In the wake of the Late Bronze Age collapse around 1200 BC, Aramean tribes began to migrate into Assyrian ruled territory. In the first millennium BC, Aramean linguistic influence on Assyria grew greater and greater, owing to further migrations as well as mass deportations enacted by several Assyrian kings. Though the expansion of the Assyrian Empire, in combination with resettlements and deportations, changed the ethno-linguistic make-up of the Assyrian heartland to some degree, there is no evidence to suggest that the more ancient Assyrian inhabitants of the land ever disappeared or became restricted to a small elite, nor that the ethnic and cultural identity of the new settlers was anything other than "Assyrian" after one or two generations.

Because the Assyrians never imposed their language on foreign peoples whose lands they conquered outside of the Assyrian heartland, there were no mechanisms in place to stop the spread of languages other than Akkadian. Beginning with the migrations of Aramaic-speaking settlers into Assyrian controlled territory during the Middle Assyrian period, this lack of linguistic policies facilitated the spread of the Aramaic language. As the most widely spoken and mutually understandable of the Semitic languages (Semitic being the language group containing many of the languages spoken through the empire, although Indo-European, Hurro-Urartian and various isolates were also present), Aramaic grew in importance throughout the Neo-Assyrian period and increasingly replaced the Akkadian language even within the Assyrian heartland itself. From the 9th century BC onwards, Aramaic became the de facto lingua franca, with Akkadian becoming relegated to a language of the political elite (i.e. governors and officials).

The widespread adoption of the language does not indicate a wholesale replacement of the original native population; the Aramaic language was used not only by settlers but also by native Assyrians, who adopted it and its alphabetic script. The Aramaic language had entered the Assyrian royal administration by the reign of Shalmaneser III (r. 859–824 BC), given that Aramaic writings are known from a palace he built in Kalhu. By the time of Tiglath-Pileser III (r. 745–727 BC), the Assyrian kings employed both Akkadian and Aramaic-language royal scribes (with Sumerian still being used for religious purposes), confirming the rise of Aramaic to a position of an official language used by the imperial administration. It is clear that Aramaic was spoken by the Assyrian royal family from at least the late 8th century BC onwards, given that Tiglath-Pileser's son Shalmaneser V (r. 727–722 BC) owned a set of lion weights inscribed with text in both Akkadian and Aramaic. A recorded drop in the number of cuneiform documents late in the reign of Ashurbanipal (r. 669–631 BC) could indicate a greater shift to Aramaic, often written on perishable materials like leather scrolls or papyrus, though it could perhaps alternatively be attributed to political instability in the empire. The denizens of Assur and other former Assyrian population centers under Parthian rule, who clearly connected themselves to ancient Assyria, wrote and spoke in Aramaic.

Though modern Assyrian languages, most prominently the Suret language, are Neo-Aramaic languages with little resemblance to the old Akkadian language, they are not wholly without Akkadian influence. Most notably there are numerous examples of Akkadian loanwords in both ancient and modern Aramaic languages. This connection was noted already in 1974, when a study by Stephen A. Kaufman found that the Syriac language, an Assyrian Aramaic dialect today mainly used liturgical language, has at least fourteen exclusive (i.e. not attested in other dialects) loanwords from Akkadian, including nine of which are clearly from the ancient Assyrian dialect (six of which are architectural or topographical terms). A 2011 study by Kathleen Abraham and Michael Sokoloff on 282 words previously believed to have been Aramaic loanwords in Akkadian determined that many such cases were questionable, and also found that 15 of those words were actually Akkadian loanwords in Aramaic and that the direction of the loan could not be determined in 22 cases; Abraham's and Sokoloff's conclusion was that the number of loanwords from Akkadian to Aramaic was far larger than the number of loanwords from Aramaic to Akkadian. Elements of Neo-Assyrian Akkadian survived the fall of the empire, with the language imparting a noticeable lexical heritage on certain varieties of Aramaic which were present in the northern Mesopotamian area. Akkadian is the underlying substrate of multiple modern Syriac phenomena, some of which have managed to survive four-thousand years, and both languages can help to decipher each other in their linguistics at times.

== Academia and politics ==
The use of the Assyrian name by modern Assyrians has historically led to controversy and misunderstanding, not only within but also outside the Assyrian community. Discussions on the connection between the modern and ancient Assyrians have also entered into academia. In addition to support by prominent historical Assyriologists, such as Austen Henry Layard and Sidney Smith, Assyrian continuity enjoys wide support within contemporary Assyriology. Among proponents of continuity are prominent Assyriologists such as Simo Parpola, Robert D. Biggs, H. W. F. Saggs, Georges Roux, J. A. Brinkman, Mirko Novák, and Robert Rollinger. Historians of other fields have also supported Assyrian continuity, such as the Iranologist Richard Nelson Frye, Philip K. Hitti, Patricia Crone, Michael Cook, Mordechai Nisan, Aryo Makko, Helen Younansardaroud, Onver A. Cetrez, Racho Donef, linguist Geoffrey Khan, Eden Naby, Cynthia Jean, Andreas D. Boldt, Amar Annus, Artur Boháč, John MacGinnnis, Natalie Naomi May, Maria Gabriella Micale, Svante Lundgren, and Joshua J. Mark (contributor of the World History Encyclopedia). Other scholars supporting continuity include, among others, the linguist Judah Segal, the political scientist James Jupp, the genocide researcher Hannibal Travis, alongside the political scientist and genocide researcher Adam Jones, and the geneticists Luigi Luca Cavalli-Sforza, Paolo Menozzi, Alberto Piazza, Mohammad Taghi Akbari, Sunder S. Papiha, Derek Frank Roberts, and Dariush Farhud. Numerous scholars who themselves are of Assyrian origin, such as Efrem Yildiz, Sargon Donabed, Odisho Malko Gewargis, Edward Y. Odisho, Konstantine Matveef, Shamiran Mako, Fuat Deniz, Helen Malko, and William Piroyan, Amir Harrak, Hirmis Aboona, Nicholas Al-Jeloo, Zack Cherry, Alda Benjamen, and Joseph Yacoub have also published academic works and lectures in support of Assyrian continuity.

Wholesale opposition of Assyrian continuity is not reflected within Assyriology, Karen Radner considers Assyrian continuity to still be a matter of debate, but also opposes the idea that Assyrian identity only emerged in the 19th century, noting that modern Christians in northern Mesopotamia saw themselves as descendants of the ancient Assyrians long before the discovery of ancient sites and visits by foreign missionaries, as can for instance be gathered from the accounts of Horatio Postgate. Due to the efforts of many scholars in diverse fields of study, such a denial of Assyrian continuity has become increasingly difficult to sustain in academia. Some opponents to Assyrian continuity, such as Becker, have argued that the rich Christian literature from the Sasanian period connecting with ancient Assyria was simply based on the Bible, rather than actual remembrance of ancient Assyria, despite several figures appearing in the tales, such as Esarhaddon and Sargon II, barely being mentioned in the Bible. (Note: Sargon II was for instance due to being mentioned only once in the Bible long forgotten in western scholarship and was only accepted as a real Assyrian king within Assyriology in the 1860s.) The texts are also very much a local Assyrian phenomenon, given that the historical accounts presented in them are at odds with those of other historical writings from the Sasanian Empire. The use of Assyria and Assyrians in Syriac texts is not fundamentally the product of an invention based on foreign or biblical sources, but rather a reinterpretation of the Syriac Christian past founded on local histories and memories that encountered Roman and Christian texts, and were fused with them.

Names clearly reminiscent of those used by Assyrians in the Neo-Assyrian Empire continued to be used at Assur throughout the post-imperial period, at least until the 3rd century AD. Some opponents to Assyrian continuity, such as David Wilmshurst, hold that ancient Assyrian names ceased being used in the Christian period and that this in turn was evidence of a lack of continuity. There is some evidence of continued use of names with explicit ancient Mesopotamian connections in the Christian period; Arabic-language records from 13th-century Rumkale for instance record a man by the name Nebuchadnezzar (rendered Bukthanaṣar in the Arabic text), a relative of a Patriarch of the Syriac Orthodox Church named Philoxenus Nemrud (also a name with ancient Assyrian connections, deriving either from Nimrud or Nimrod); both of these names are also however mentioned in the Bible. Modern Assyrian authors, such as Odisho Malko Gewargis, contend that a decrease in ancient pagan names invoking gods such as Ashur, Nabu and Sîn is hardly surprising given the Christianization of the Assyrians; similar cases of native names being increasingly replaced by Biblically derived names are also known from numerous other Christianized peoples.

=== Denial ===
Some academics, most notably the historians J.F. Coakley, John Joseph, David Wilmshurst and Adam H. Becker, have opposed continuity between modern and ancient Assyrians, typically arguing that modern Assyrian identity only emerged in the middle to late 19th century as a consequence of interactions with foreign missionaries and/or the discovery of ancient Assyrian ruins. Wilmshurst labeled Assyrian descent "a travesty of the truth" and claimed that "the native Christian population of Iraq and Iran is thoroughly mongrel, and has been for centuries."

Modern Assyrians consider opposition to Assyrian continuity to be offensive, and associate it with other historical forms of oppression against them. Sargon Donabed, for instance, considers the use of terms such as "Chaldeans", "Syrian", "Syriacs", "Arameans", or more extremely "Arab Christians", "Kurdish Christians" and "Turkish Christians", to be harmful as they add to division and confusion in regard to identity and are "clearly reflective of modern political parlance". In a 2022 article, Donabed also wrote that denial of Assyrian continuity constitutes a normalization and propagation of epistemic violence against Assyrians in academia, manifested in ways such as scare quotes in Syriac studies and reducing Assyrians to being defined as solely "Nestorians" from Hakkari. Director of the Leiden Project, Prof. Bas ter Haar Romeny, also reminds that denying modern Syriac Christians the right to identify with the ancient Assyrians would be using a double standard.

Aryo Makko has stated that Western scholarship has treated Assyrian identity in a pejorative, even hostile, fashion, refusing to refer to it without citations or viewing the existence of an Assyrian identity as regrettable. He states that the understanding of Assyrian identity originates in Orientalism and studying Assyrians as only Eastern Christians, based on the study of Syriac language religious sources, and ignores both contemporary processes and Armenian, Persian, and Ottoman sources. He further states that these disciplines were unchallenged on their position until recently, and that Assyrian identity suffered from the challenge of its historicity by Syriac studies scholars and related academics, who "viewed it as funny, illegitimate and even dangerous."

Anti-Assyrian tendencies to deny Assyrian identity have been documented especially since after the Simele massacre in 1933. Views against Assyrian continuity are heavily attributable to the actions of the government in Ba'athist Iraq (1968–2003), which sought to counteract Assyrian demands for autonomy through refusing to recognize Assyrians as a third ethnic minority of the country, instead promoting Assyrians, "Syrians" and Chaldeans as separate peoples, and undercounted Assyrians in censuses; in 1977, it was made impossible to register as Assyrian in the national census and Assyrians were consequently forced to register as Arabs for fear of losing employment and ration cards. In Sweden, the advent of the Assyrian naming dispute saw arguments from those emphasizing "Syrian" or "Syriac" identity involving a denial of Assyrian continuity, insisting that ancient Assyrians had long died out and that the term was invented by the British to support imperialism in Iraq.

Members of the Assyrian community, such as David Barsum Perley, have previously challenged denial of Assyrian continuity. In particular, Perley challenged Arnold J. Toynbee and Adolf Leo Oppenheim.

Arbella Bet-Shlimon, in contrast to other scholars, argues that the debate over whether or not Assyrians are direct descendants of ancient Assyrians is a form of discredited race science. She holds that the denial of Assyrian identity outside of direct descent from ancient Assyrians has contributed to anti-Assyrian sentiment in academia.

== Genetics ==
Genetic testing of Assyrian populations is a relatively new field of study, but has hitherto supported continuity from Bronze and Iron Age populations and underlined the notion that Assyrians historically rarely intermarried with surrounding populations. Genetic studies conducted in 2000 and 2008 support Assyrians as genetically distinct from other groups in the Middle East such as Arabs, Kurds, Turks, Iranians, Armenians, Shabaks, Turcomans and Levantine peoples, with high endogamy; indicating that the community has historically been relatively closed owing to their religious and cultural traditions, with little intermixture with other groups. A study from 2017 investigating the genetics of various northern Iraqi population groups found that Assyrians and Yezidis clustered together, but away from other population groups in northern Iraq analyzed by the study, with the Iraqi Assyrians seen to be a genetically homogenous and enclosed group of people. According to the study, "contemporary Syriacs and Yazidis from northern Iraq may in fact have a stronger continuity with the original genetic stock of the Mesopotamian people, which possibly provided the basis for the ethnogenesis of various subsequent Near Eastern populations."

== See also ==
- Assyria
- Neo-Assyrian Empire
- Old Assyrian Empire
- Middle Assyrian Empire
- Achaemenid Assyria
- Asoristan
- History of the Assyrians
- Assyrian culture
- Assyrian cuisine
- Assyrian Music
- Assyrian nationalism
- Assyrian Church of the East
- Syriac Orthodox Church
- Chaldean Catholic Church
- Name of Syria
- List of ethnic Assyrians
- Nationalist historiography

== Bibliography ==
=== Books ===
- Becker, Adam H. (2015). Revival and Awakening: American Evangelical Missionaries in Iran and the Origins of Assyrian Nationalism. Chicago: University of Chicago Press. ISBN 978-0-226-14528-0.
- Benjamen, Alda (2022). Assyrians in Modern Iraq: Negotiating Political and Cultural Space. Cambridge: Cambridge University Press. ISBN 978-1-108-83879-5.
- Brock, Sebastian P.; Taylor, David G.K., eds. (2001). The Hidden Pearl: The Syrian Orthodox Church and its Ancient Aramaic Heritage. Volume I: The Ancient Aramaic Heritage. Volume II: The Heirs of the Ancient Aramaic Heritage. Volume III: At the Turn of the Third Millennium: the Syrian Orthodox Witness. Rome: Trans World Film Italia.
- Cameron, Averil (2009). The Byzantines. Oxford: John Wiley and Sons. ISBN 978-1-4051-9833-2.
- Cavalli-Sforza, Luigi Luca; Menozzi, Paolo & Piazza, Alberto (1994). The History and Geography of Human Genes. Princeton: Princeton University Press. ISBN 0-691-08750-4.
- Cetrez, Önver A.; Donabed, Sargon G.; Makko, Aryo, eds. (2012). The Assyrian Heritage: Threads of Continuity and Influence. Uppsala: Uppsala Universitet.
  Review: Tower, Daniel (2013). "Önver A. Cetrez, Sargon G. Donabed, and Aryo Makko, eds.: The Assyrian Heritage: Threads of Continuity and Influence. Uppsala: Acta Universitatis Upsaliensis, 2012; pp. xiii + 345". Journal of Religious History. 37 (3): 431–433. doi:10.1111/1467-9809.12087.
- Crone, Patricia; Cook, Michael A. (1977). Hagarism: The Making of the Islamic World. Cambridge: Cambridge University Press. ISBN 978-0-521-21133-8.
- Düring, Bleda S. (2020). The Imperialisation of Assyria: An Archaeological Approach. Cambridge: Cambridge University Press. ISBN 978-1-108-47874-8.
- Gaunt, David; Atto, Naures; Barthoma, Soner O. (2017). Let Them Not Return: Sayfo – The Genocide Against the Assyrian, Syriac, and Chaldean Christians in the Ottoman Empire. New York: Berghahn. ISBN 978-1-78533-498-6.
- Harper, Prudence O.; Klengel-Brandt, Evelyn; Aruz, Joan; Benzel, Kim (1995). Assyrian Origins: Discoveries at Ashur on the Tigris: Antiquities in the Vorderasiatisches Museum, Berlin. New York: Metropolitan Museum of Art. ISBN 0-87099-743-2.
- Holloway, Steven W. (2003). "The Quest for Sargon, Pul and Tiglath-Pileser in the Nineteenth Century". In Chavalas, Mark W.; Younger, Jr, K. Lawson (eds.). Mesopotamia and the Bible. Edinburgh: A&C Black. ISBN 978-1-84127-252-8.
- Hitti, Philip K. (1951). History of Syria: Including Lebanon and Palestine. London: MacMillan. OCLC 5510718.
- Jackson, Cailah (2020). Islamic Manuscripts of Late Medieval Rum, 1270s-1370s: Production, Patronage and the Arts of the Book. Edinburgh: Edinburgh University Press. ISBN 978-1-4744-5150-5.
- Jupp, James (2001). Australian People: An Encyclopedia of the Nation, its People and their Origins. Cambridge: Cambridge University Press. ISBN 0-521-80789-1.
- Kaufman, Stephen A. (1974). The Akkadian Influences on Aramaic. The Oriental Institute of the University of Chicago Assyriological Studies. Chicago: University of Chicago Press. ISBN 0-226-62281-9.
- Minov, Sergey (2020). Memory and Identity in the Syriac Cave of Treasures: Rewriting the Bible in Sasanian Iran. Leiden: BRILL. ISBN 978-90-04-44550-5.
- Nisan, Mordechai (2002). Minorities in the Middle East: A History of Struggle and Self-Expression (2nd ed.). Jefferson: McFarland. ISBN 978-0-7864-1375-1.
- Radner, Karen (2015). Ancient Assyria: A Very Short Introduction. Oxford: Oxford University Press. ISBN 978-0-19-871590-0.
- Roux, Georges (1992). Ancient Iraq. Penguin Books. ISBN 978-0-14-012523-8.
- Saggs, Henry W. F. (1984). The Might That Was Assyria. London: Sidgwick & Jackson. ISBN 978-0-312-03511-2.
- Segal, Judah B. (1970). Edessa: The Blessed City. Oxford: Clarendon Press. ISBN 978-0-19-821545-5.
- Travis, Hannibal (2010). Genocide in the Middle East: The Ottoman Empire, Iraq, and Sudan. Durham: Carolina Academic Press. ISBN 978-1-59460-436-2.
- Wilmshurst, David (2011). The martyred Church: A History of the Church of the East. London: East & West Publishing Limited. ISBN 978-1-907318-04-7.

=== Book chapters ===
- Becker, Adam H. (2008). "The Ancient Near East in the Late Antique Near East: Syriac Christian Appropriation of the Biblical East". Antiquity in Antiquity: Jewish and Christian Pasts in the Greco-Roman World. Tübingen: Mohr Siebeck. pp. 394–415. ISBN 978-3-16-149411-6.
- Butts, Aaron Michael (2017). "Assyrian Christians". In E. Frahm (ed.). A Companion to Assyria. Hoboken: John Wiley & Sons. ISBN 978-1-118-32524-7.
- Donabed, Sargon (2019). "Persistent Perseverance: A Trajectory of Assyrian History in the Modern Age". In Rowe, Paul S. (ed.). Routledge Handbook of Minorities in the Middle East. London: Routledge. ISBN 978-1-138-64904-0.
- Frahm, Eckart (2017). "Introduction". In E. Frahm (ed.). A Companion to Assyria. Hoboken: John Wiley & Sons. ISBN 978-1-118-32524-7.
- Frahm, Eckart (2017). "The Neo-Assyrian Period (ca. 1000–609 BCE)". In E. Frahm (ed.). A Companion to Assyria. Hoboken: John Wiley & Sons. ISBN 978-1-118-32524-7.
- Frahm, Eckart (2017). "Assyria in the Hebrew Bible". In E. Frahm (ed.). A Companion to Assyria. Hoboken: John Wiley & Sons. ISBN 978-1-118-32524-7.
- Haider, Peter W. (2008). "Tradition and change in the beliefs at Assur, Nineveh and Nisibis between 300 BC and AD 300". In Kaizer, Ted (ed.). The Variety of Local Religious Life in the Near East: In the Hellenistic and Roman Periods. Leiden: BRILL. ISBN 978-90-04-16735-3.
- Hauser, Stefan R. (2017). "Post-Imperial Assyria". In E. Frahm (ed.). A Companion to Assyria. Hoboken: John Wiley & Sons. ISBN 978-1-118-32524-7.
- Kalimi, Isaac; Richardson, Seth (2014). "Sennacherib at the Gates of Jerusalem: Story, History and Historiography: An Introduction". In Kalimi, Isaac; Richardson, Seth (eds.). Sennacherib at the Gates of Jerusalem: Story, History and Historiography. Leiden: Brill Publishers. ISBN 978-90-04-26561-5.
- Luukko, Mikko; Van Buylaere, Greta (2017). "Languages and Writing Systems in Assyria". In E. Frahm (ed.). A Companion to Assyria. Hoboken: John Wiley & Sons. ISBN 978-1-118-32524-7.
- Makko, Aryo (2012). "Discourse, Identity and Politics: A Transnational Approach to Assyrian Identity in the Twentieth Century". In Cetrez, Önver A.; Donabed, Sargon G.; Makko, Aryo (eds.). The Assyrian Heritage: threads of continuity and influence. Uppsala: Uppsala Universitet. ISSN 1654-630X.
- Michel, Cécile (2017). "Economy, Society, and Daily Life in the Old Assyrian Period". In E. Frahm (ed.). A Companion to Assyria. Hoboken: John Wiley & Sons. ISBN 978-1-118-32524-7.
- Naby, Eden (2006). "Assyrian Nationalism in Iraq: Survival under Religious and Ethnic Threat". In Burszta, Wojciech J.; Kamusella, Tomasz & Wojchiechowski, Sebastian (eds.). Nationalisms Across the Globe: An Overview of Nationalisms in State-Endowed and Statless Nations, Volume II: the World. Bygoszcz: School of Humanities and Journalism. ISBN 83-87653-46-2.
- Novák, Mirko (2016). "Assyrians and Arameans: Modes of Cohabitation and Acculuration at Guzana (Tell Halaf)". In Aruz, Joan; Seymour, Michael (eds.). Assyria to Iberia: Art and Culture in the Iron Age. New York: Metropolitan Museum of Art. ISBN 978-1-58839-606-8.
- Payne, Richard (2012). "Avoiding Ethnicity: Uses of the Ancient Past in Late Sasanian Northern Mesopotamia". In Pohl, Walter; Gantner, Clemens; Payne, Richard (eds.). Visions of Community in the Post-Roman World: The West, Byzantium and the Islamic World, 300–1100. Farnham: Ashgate Publishing. ISBN 978-1-4094-2709-4.
- Radner, Karen (2021). "Diglossia and the Neo-Assyrian Empire's Akkadian and Aramaic Text Production". In Jonker, Louis C.; Berlejung, Angelika & Cornelius, Izak (eds.). Multilingualism in Ancient Contexts: Perspectives from Ancient Near Eastern and Early Christian Contexts. Stellenbosch: African Sun Media. ISBN 978-1-991201-16-4.
- Reade, Julian Edgeworth (2018). "Nineveh Rediscovered". In Brereton, Gareth (ed.). I am Ashurbanipal, king of the World, king of Assyria. London: Thames & Hudson. ISBN 978-0-500-48039-7.
- Shehadeh, Lamia Rustum (2011). "The name of Syria in ancient and modern usage". In Beshara, Adel (ed.). The Origins of Syrian Nationhood: Histories, pioneers and identity. Oxford: Routledge. ISBN 978-0-415-61504-4.
- Tamari, Steve (2019). "The Land of Syria in the Late Seventeenth Century: ʿAbd al-Ghani al-Nabulusi and Linking City and Countryside through Study, Travel, and Worship". In Tamari, Steve (ed.). Grounded Identities: Territory and Belonging in the Medieval and Early Modern Middle East and Mediterranean. Leiden: BRILL. ISBN 978-90-04-38533-7.
- Trolle Larsen, Mogens (2017). "The Archaeological Exploration of Assyria". In E. Frahm (ed.). A Companion to Assyria. Hoboken: John Wiley & Sons. ISBN 978-1-118-32524-7.

=== Journal articles ===
- Abraham, Kathleen; Sokoloff, Michael (2011). "Aramaic Loanwords in Akkadian – A Reassessment of the Proposals". Archiv für Orientforschung. 52: 22–76. JSTOR 24595102.
- Akbari, Mohammad Taghi; Papiha, Sunder S.; Roberts, Derek Frank; Farhud, Dariush (1986). "Genetic differentiation among Iranian Christian communities". American Journal of Human Genetics. 38 (1): 84–98. PMC 1684716. PMID 3456196.
- Bahrani, Zainab (2006). "Race and Ethnicity in Mesopotamian Antiquity". World Archaeology. 38 (1): 48–59. doi:10.1080/00438240500509843. JSTOR 40023594. S2CID 144093611.
- Banoei, Mohammad Mehdi; Chaleshtori, Morteza Hashemzadeh; Sanati, Mohammad Hossein; Shariati, Parvin; Houshmand, Massoud; Majidizadeh, Tayebeh; Soltani, Niloofar Jahangir; Golalipour, Massoud (2008). "Variation ofDAT1 VNTR Alleles and Genotypes Among Old Ethnic Groups in Mesopotamia to the Oxus Region". Human Biology. 80 (1): 73–81. doi:10.3378/1534-6617(2008)80[73:VODVAA]2.0.CO;2. JSTOR 41465951. PMID 18505046. S2CID 10417591.
- Bet-Shlimon, Arbella (21 April 2026). ""Propaganda of the Victims": Atrocity Denial, Ethnic Nationalism, and the Disparagement of Assyrians in Middle East Studies". Review of Middle East Studies. Cambridge University Press. doi:10.1017/rms.2026.10037.
- Biggs, Robert D. (2005). "My Career in Assyriology and Near Eastern Archaeology" (PDF). Journal of Assyrian Academic Studies. 19 (1): 1–23. Archived from the original (PDF) on 27 February 2008.
- Dalley, Stephanie (1993). "Nineveh after 612 BC". Altorientalische Forschungen. 20 (1): 134–147. doi:10.1524/aofo.1993.20.1.134. S2CID 163383142.
- Donabed, Sargon (August 2022). "The Existential Threat of Academic Bias: The Institutionalization of Anti-Assyrian Rhetoric". International Journal of Middle East Studies. 54 (3): 547–553. doi:10.1017/S0020743822000770. eISSN 1471-6380.
- Donabed, Sargon (2012). "Rethinking Nationalism and an Appellative Conundrum: Historiography and Politics in Iraq". National Identities. 14 (4): 407–431. Bibcode:2012NatId..14..407D. doi:10.1080/14608944.2012.733208. S2CID 145265726.
- Donabed, Sargon; Mako, Shamiran (2009). "Ethno-cultural and Religious Identity of Syrian Orthodox Christians". Revue d'Histoire de l'Université de Balamand: 71–113. ISSN 1608-7526.
- Efstathiadou, Anna (2011). "Representing Greekness: French and Greek Lithographs from the Greek War of Independence (1821–1827) and the Greek-Italian War (1940–1941)" (PDF). Journal of Modern Greek Studies. 29 (2): 191–218. doi:10.1353/mgs.2011.0023. S2CID 144506772.
- Frye, Richard N. (1999). "Reply to John Joseph" (PDF). Journal of Assyrian Academic Studies. 13 (1): 69–70. Archived from the original (PDF) on 11 July 2020.
- Gaunt, David (9 December 2010). "Identity Conflicts among Oriental Christians in Sweden" (PDF). Sens Public. doi:10.7202/1064038ar. ISSN 2104-3272.
- Gewargis, Odisho Malko (2002). "We Are Assyrians" (PDF). Journal of Assyrian Academic Studies. 16 (1): 77–95. Archived from the original (PDF) on 21 April 2003.
- Kuhrt, Amélie (1995). "The Assyrian heartland in the Achaemenid period". Pallas. Revue d'études antiques. 43 (43): 239–254. JSTOR 43660582.
- Livingstone, Alasdair (2009). "Remembrance at Assur: The Case of the dated Aramaic memorials". Studia Orientalia Electronica. 106: 151–157.
- Lundgren, Svante (2023). "When the Assyrian Tragedy Became Seyfo: A Study of Swedish-Assyrian Politics of Memory". Genocide Studies International. 14 (2): 95–108. doi:10.3138/GSI-2022-0002. S2CID 257178308.
- Morrison, Susannah (2018). ""A Kindred Sigh for Thee": British Responses to the Greek War for Independence". The Thetean: A Student Journal for Scholarly Historical Writing. 47 (1): 37–55.
- Parpola, Simo (1999). "Assyrians after Assyria". Journal of Assyrian Academic Studies. 13 (2).
- Parpola, Simo (2004). "National and Ethnic Identity in the Neo-Assyrian Empire and Assyrian Identity in Post-Empire Times" (PDF). Journal of Assyrian Academic Studies. 18 (2): 5–22.
- Petrosian, Vahram (2006). "Assyrians in Iraq". Iran and the Caucasus. 10 (1): 138. doi:10.1163/157338406777979322. S2CID 154905506.
- Reade, Julian E. (1998). "Greco-Parthian Nineveh". Iraq. 60: 65–83. doi:10.2307/4200453. JSTOR 4200453. S2CID 191474172.
- Rollinger, Robert (2006). "The Terms "Assyria" and "Syria" Again". Journal of Near Eastern Studies. 65 (4): 283–287. doi:10.1086/511103. JSTOR 10.1086/511103. S2CID 162760021.
- Smith, Sidney (1926). "Notes on "The Assyrian Tree"". Bulletin of the School of Oriental Studies, University of London. 4 (1): 69–76. doi:10.1017/S0041977X00102599. JSTOR 607403. S2CID 178173677.
- Valk, Jonathan (1 November 2020). "Crime and Punishment: Deportation in the Levant in the Age of Assyrian Hegemony". Bulletin of the American Schools of Oriental Research. 384: 77–103. doi:10.1086/710485. S2CID 225379553.
- Yildiz, Efrem (1999). "The Assyrians: A Historical and Current Reality". Journal of Assyrian Academic Studies. 13 (1): 15–30.

=== Other ===
- Mark, Joshua J. (2018). "Assyria". World History Encyclopedia.
- Michael, Sargon R., ed. (2 April 1979). "Special issue dedicated in memory of Dr. David B. Perley" (PDF). Nineveh Magazine. Vol. 2, no. 4. Berkeley, California. Archived from the original (PDF) on 24 October 2023.
- Salem, Chris (24 December 2020). "A Name Chaldeans Forgot: Assyria". Medium.
