= Rediscovery of Sargon II =

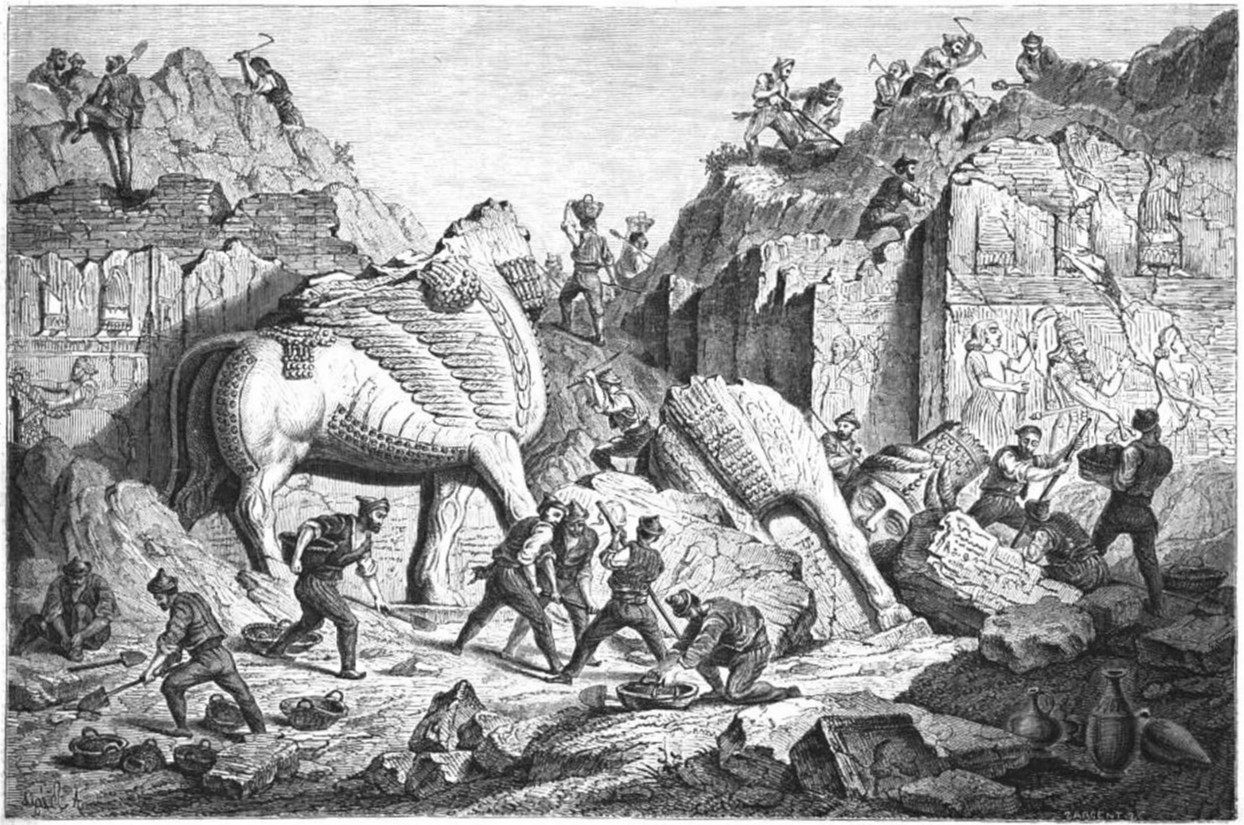
1861 illustration by Eugène Flandin of excavations of the ruins of Dur-Sharrukin, the Assyrian capital city founded by Sargon II

Sargon II ruled the Neo-Assyrian Empire from 722 to 705 BC as one of its most successful kings. In his final military campaign, Sargon was killed in battle in the south-eastern Anatolian region Tabal and the Assyrian army was unable to retrieve his body, which meant that he could not undergo the traditional royal Assyrian burial. In ancient Mesopotamia, not being buried was believed to condemn the dead to becoming a hungry and restless ghost for eternity. As a result, the Assyrians believed that Sargon must have committed some grave sin in order to suffer this fate. His son and successor Sennacherib (r. 705–681), convinced of Sargon's sin, consequently spent much effort to distance himself from his father and to rid the empire from his work and imagery. Sennacherib's efforts led to Sargon only rarely being mentioned in later texts. When modern Assyriology took form in Western Europe in the 18th century, historians mainly followed the writings of classical Greco-Roman authors and the descriptions of Assyria in the Hebrew Bible for information. Given that Sargon is barely mentioned in either, he was consequently forgotten, the then prevalent historical reconstructions placing Sennacherib as the direct successor of Sargon's predecessor Shalmaneser V and identifying Sargon as an alternate name for one of the more well-known kings.

After centuries of Sargon being forgotten, there were important developments in Assyriology in the 19th century and the traditional reconstruction of Assyrian history became increasingly challenged in the scholarly community. In 1825, Ernst Friedrich Karl Rosenmüller was the first to recognize Sargon, based solely on the name's single appearance in the Bible, as a distinct king. Though there was some further scholarly support during the years that followed, the most significant developments came after the ruins of Sargon's ancient capital city, Dur-Sharrukin, were discovered by Paul-Émile Botta in 1843. Before the cuneiform inscriptions were deciphered in 1847 it was impossible to identify the builder of the city. In 1845, Isidore Löwenstern was the first to suggest Sargon as the builder; though Löwenstern's analysis had little scientific basis, his conclusion was by coincidence correct. Sargon was securely identified as the builder of Dur-Sharrukin by Adrien Prévost de Longpérier in 1847, after the inscriptions had been deciphered. Sargon was despite this not immediately recognized as a distinct king, with some still preferring to view him as the same person as one of the more well-established kings. Works published in the 1850s and 1860s, most prominently publications by Edward Hincks, Austen Henry Layard and George Smith, slowly turned Sargon into a textbook entity. In 1886, he received his own entry in the Ninth edition of the Encyclopædia Britannica and by the beginning of the 20th century he was as well-accepted and recognized as any of the other great Neo-Assyrian kings.

== Background ==
=== Sargon's death and its implications ===
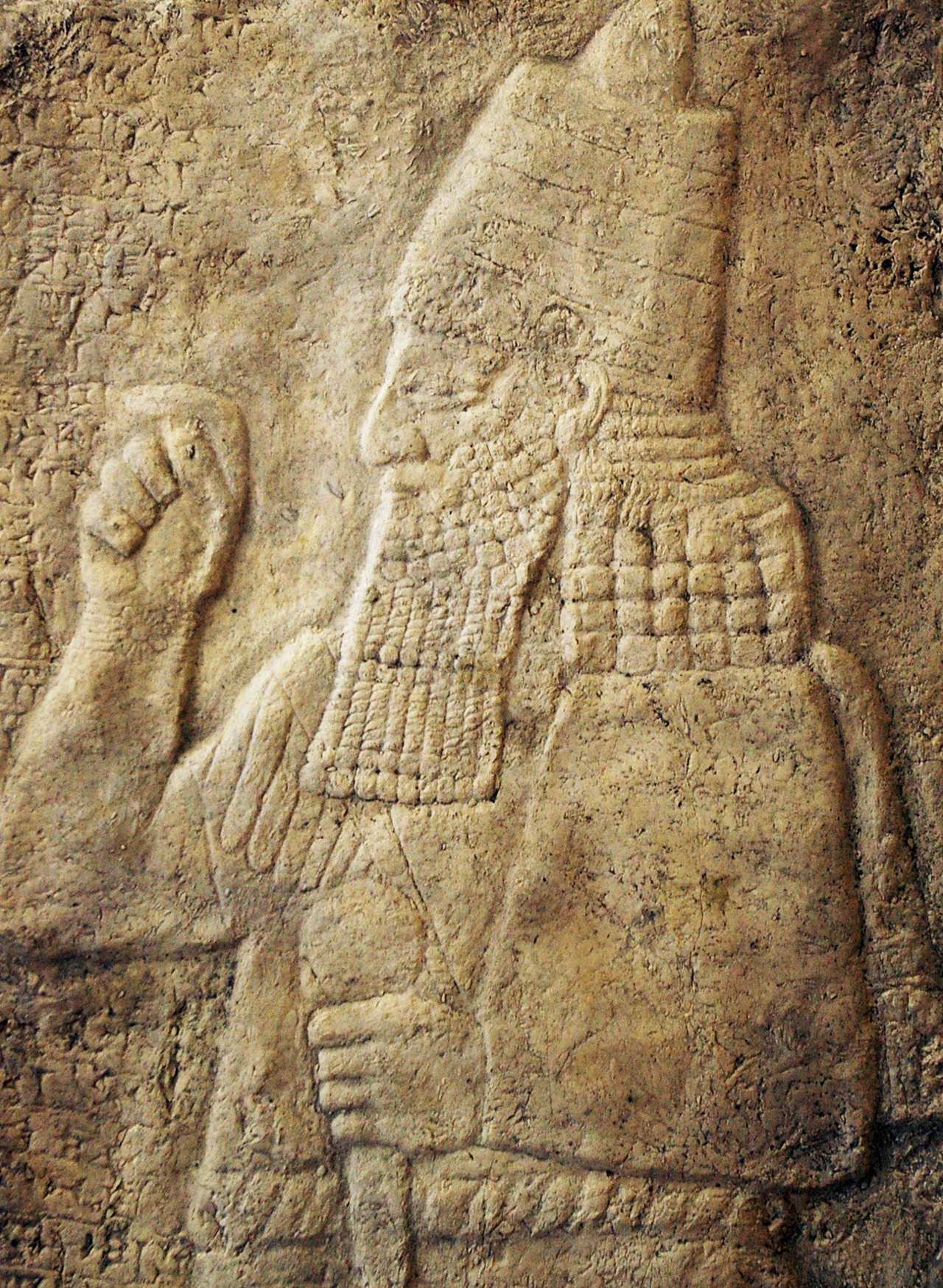
Disturbed by the manner of his father's death, Sargon II's son Sennacherib (r. 705–681 BC; pictured), spent much effort to distance himself from his father and rid the Neo-Assyrian Empire of Sargon's work

Sargon II acceded to the throne of the Neo-Assyrian Empire in 722 BC. By the time of his death in 705, he had ruled the empire with remarkable success for 17 years. Sargon significantly expanded the empire's borders, defeated its most prominent enemies and founded a new capital city named after himself, Dur-Sharrukin. His final military campaign, directed to the notoriously difficult to control region of Tabal in southeastern Anatolia, ended in disaster as the Assyrian camp was attacked by Gurdî of Kulumma and Sargon was killed in the fighting, with the soldiers unable to retrieve his body.

Sargon's legacy in ancient Assyria was severely damaged by the manner of his death; his battlefield death and the inability to recover his body was a major psychological blow for the empire. The ancient Assyrians believed that unburied dead became ghosts (eṭemmu) that could come back and haunt the living; these ghosts were further believed to have a miserable existence, being constantly hungry and restless. Sargon's son and successor, Sennacherib (r. 705–681) was horrified by Sargon's death and believed that he must have committed some unforgivable sin which made the gods abandon him, perhaps that he had offended Babylon's god upon his capture of that city in 710. As a consequence of the theological implications of Sargon's death, Sennacherib did everything he could to distance himself from his father and never wrote or built anything in his memory; he transferred the capital to Nineveh and worked to rid the empire of Sargon's imagery and works. Images Sargon had created at the temple in Assur were for instance made invisible through raising the level of the courtyard.

=== Sargon in ancient sources ===
Due to Sennacherib's efforts, Sargon is scarcely mentioned in ancient sources. He was mentioned as an ancestor in the inscriptions of some later Assyrian kings, such as his grandson Esarhaddon (r. 681–669 BC), his great-grandson Shamash-shum-ukin (r. 668–648 BC in Babylonia) and his great-great-grandson Sinsharishkun (r. 627–612 BC). Ancient Assyria fell in the late 7th century BC, a little less than a century after Sargon's death. Because cuneiform was not decoded by modern researchers until the middle of the 19th century, these references confirming Sargon's existence could not be read by authors and scholars for many centuries following Assyria's fall.

The local population of northern Mesopotamia never forgot ancient Assyria or its most prominent rulers. That Sargon was remembered in some capacity in Mesopotamia comes from scant later Aramaic-language sources. According to the 6th-century AD History of Karka, twelve of the then contemporary noble families of Karka (ancient Arrapḫa) were descendants of ancient Assyrian nobility, explicitly noted as living there in the "time of Sargon". The personal name Sargon also survived, with there for instance being records of a priest at Mardin in the 8th century AD called Sarguno. These scant sources had little impact on later scholarship in Western Europe, where knowledge of Assyria was mainly derived from the writings of classical Greek and Latin authors as well as the accounts of the Assyrian Empire in the Bible.

Though some Assyrian kings, such as Sennacherib and Esarhaddon, are mentioned in multiple places in the Bible, Sargon's name appears only once (Isaiah 20.1) and he is unmentioned in Classical sources. Early Assyriologists were puzzled by the appearance of the name Sargon in the Bible and tended to identify it as a second name of one of the better known kings, typically Shalmaneser V, Sennacherib or Esarhaddon. Sargon is recorded in Ptolemy's 2nd century AD Canon of Kings as one of the rulers of Babylon, though under the Greek name Arkeanos. Though scholars found it difficult to identify Arkeanos, it was not the only name in the Canon of Kings at the time unsupported by other known sources. Various explanations were proposed for the identity of Arkeanos; as late as 1857, Maximilian Wolfgang Duncker suggested identifying Arkeanos as a brother of Sennacherib and a vassal ruler of Babylonia. (Note: Duncker's proposal postdated the rediscovery of Dur-Sharrukin and the emergence of the idea that Sargon was a separate king. Recognition of Sargon's existence was closely followed by scholars recognizing him and "Arkeanos" as the same figure. In the same year as Duncker's proposal (1857), Julius Oppert and Joseph Bonomi the Younger had for instance already identified Sargon and "Arkeanos of Ptolemy" as the same king.)

== Rediscovery of Dur-Sharrukin ==
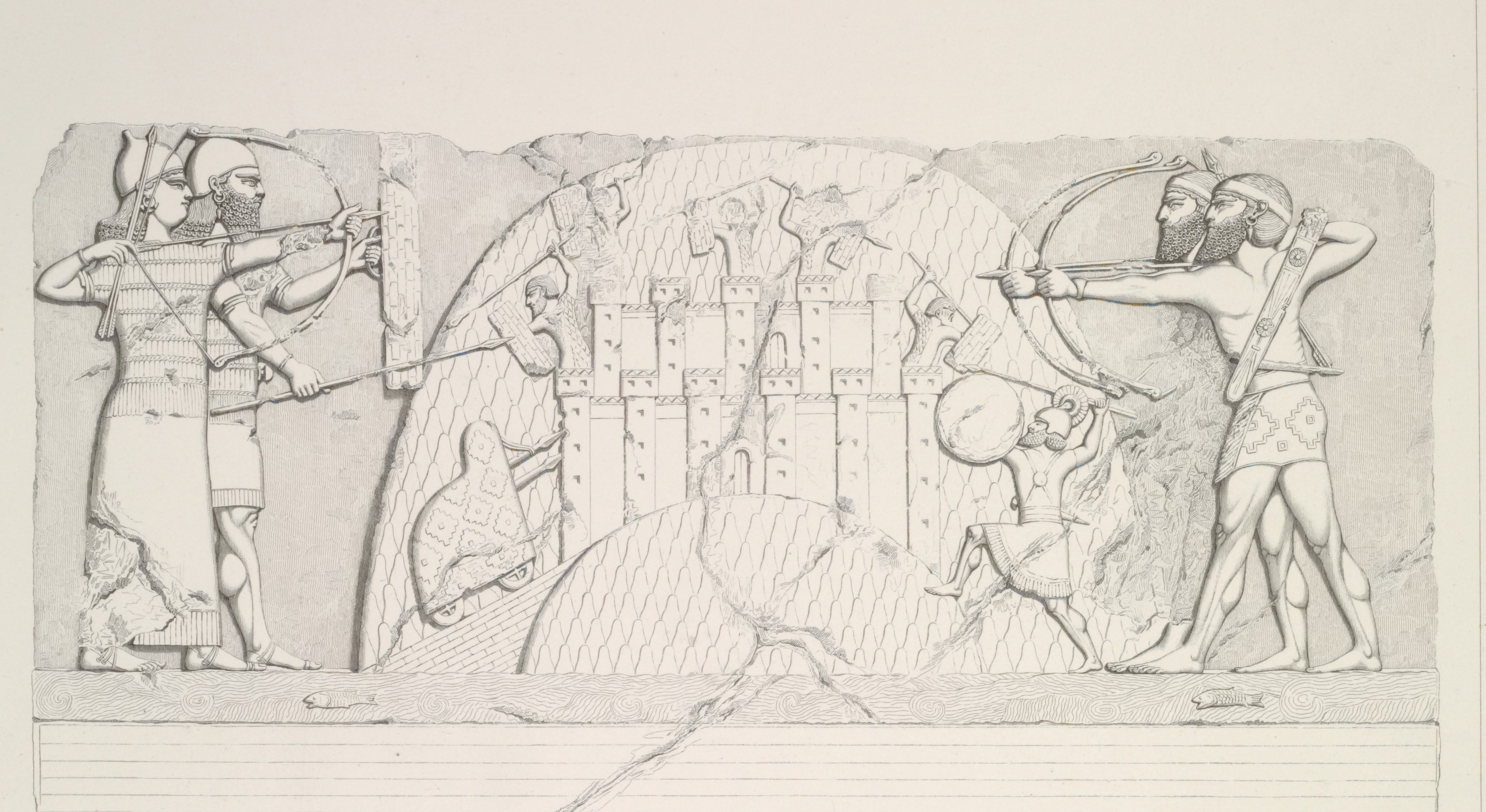
1849 illustration of a relief from Dur-Sharrukin by Eugène Flandin

Mesopotamia was long ignored by western archaeologists. Unlike other ancient civilizations, Assyria and other Mesopotamian civilizations left no magnificent ruins above ground; all that remained to see were huge grass-covered mounds in the plains which travellers at times believed to simply be natural features of the landscape. Such scant remains did not fit well with the European idea of ancient great cities, with stone columns and great sculptures like those of Greece and Persia. In the early 19th century, European explorers and archaeologists first began to investigate the ancient mounds, though early archaeologists were chiefly interested in confirming Biblical truth through their excavations rather than spending time on new interpretations of the evidence they discovered. The early excavations were in large part inspired by archaeological finds of the British business agent Claudius Rich at the site of Nineveh in 1820. After Rich's findings, Julius von Mohl, secretary of the French Société Asiatique, persuaded the French authorities to create the position of a French consul in Mosul, and to start excavations at Nineveh. The first consul to be appointed was Paul-Émile Botta in 1841.

Using funds secured by Mohl, Botta conducted extensive excavations at Nineveh. Because the ruins of the ancient city were hidden very deep below layers upon layers of later settlement and agricultural activities, Botta never reached them. At the same time as the excavation project at Nineveh failed to conjure up anything of note, the ruins of Dur-Sharrukin were rediscovered by chance. After Botta heard from the locals in 1843 that some finds had been made at the village of Khorsabad, 20 kilometers to the northeast, Botta transferred his efforts there. Through excavations headed by Botta and his associate Victor Place, the ruins of Sargon's ancient palace were quickly discovered. Botta did not know what he had found given that cuneiform had not yet been decoded, and simply referred to the site as a "monument" in his writings. The great works of art found at Dur-Sharrukin included great reliefs and stone lamassus. The discovery was swiftly communicated in scholarly circles by Mohl in Paris. In 1847, the first ever exhibition on Assyrian sculptures was held in the Louvre, composed of finds from Sargon's palace. After returning to Europe in the late 1840s, Botta compiled an elaborate report on the findings, complete with numerous drawings of the reliefs made by the artist Eugène Flandin. The report, published in 1849, showcased the majesty of Assyrian art and architecture and garnered exceptional interest. Under Botta and Place, virtually the entire palace was excavated, as were portions of the surrounding town.

== Academic developments ==
=== Sargon in early scholarship ===
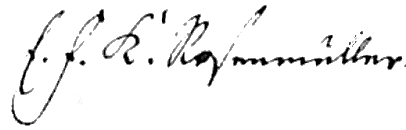
Signature of Ernst Friedrich Karl Rosenmüller, who in 1825 was the first modern scholar to view Sargon II as a distinct historical king

Dependent on classical and Biblical information, early Assyriologists reconstructed the line of Assyrian kings as beginning with the legendary Ninus and Semiramis (Note: Ninus is a purely legendary figure, with no analogue in actual Assyrian history. Semiramis was based on the historical 9th-century BC queen Shammuramat but misplaced in the chronology.) in the 28th century BC, followed by a long gap where no rulers were known, and resuming with Pul, (Note: "Pul" was used in later Greco-Roman texts as the name for Tiglath-Pileser III, but was erroneously interpreted by western scholars as a separate king. The name was long entrenched in Assyriology, with scholars for decades after cuneiform was deciphered misreading inscriptions and trying to find a historical analogue.) Tiglath-Pileser, Shalmaneser, Sennacherib, Esarhaddon and finally Sardanapalus, (Note: Sardanapalus is a legendary figure primarily based on Ashurbanipal but also incorporating elements of Shamash-shum-ukin and Sinsharishkun.) under whom the Assyrian Empire fell. Ninus and Semiramis were sometimes omitted given that scholars doubted the historicity of their legend, but the sequence from Pul onwards was produced identically by virtually all scholars in the 18th century. (Note: The Assyria reconstructed by Assyriologists prior to archaeological discoveries in Mesopotamia and the decipherment of cuneiform is so markedly different from the historical civilization that some scholars view it as a distinct intellectual construct referred to as "classical Assyria".) As mentioned, Sargon's name appearing only once in the Bible led scholars to identify the name as a secondary name of one of the more well-known kings; among others, Campegius Vitringa and Humphrey Prideaux identified Sargon with Shalmaneser, Robert Lowth identified Sargon with Sennacherib, and Perizonius and Johann David Michaelis identified Sargon with Esarhaddon.

In the early 19th century, the straightforward academic vision of Assyria began to be increasingly challenged. Particularly in German scholarship, the first half of the 19th century saw some historians suggesting that Sargon was a distinct historical king. The first historian to do so was Ernst Friedrich Karl Rosenmüller in 1825, who placed Sargon as Tiglath-Pileser's successor. Sargon was also counted as a distinct king by Wilhelm Gesenius in 1828, August Wilhelm Knobel in 1837, Heinrich Ewald in 1847 and Georg Benedikt Winer in 1849; he was sometimes placed after Tiglath-Pileser and sometimes after Shalmaneser.

=== Dur-Sharrukin and cuneiform ===
1853 photograph of excavations at Sargon II's palace in Dur-Sharrukin

Shortly after the finds at Dur-Sharrukin were publicized, the German Assyriologist Isidore Löwenstern was the first to suggest that the city had been constructed by the Sargon briefly mentioned in the Bible, though he also identified Sargon with Esarhaddon. Löwenstern's identification, published in 1845, was more of a bizarre accident than thorough scholarship. Löwenstern worked two years before cuneiform was deciphered and based his identification primarily on a relief from Dur-Sharrukin depicting a seaside city under Assyrian attack. In the inscription accompanying the relief, Löwenstern erroneously read Ashdod, a city mentioned in conjunction with Sargon in the Book of Isaiah. Löwenstern isolated the signs he believed to represent the king's name and, based on their resemblance to Hebrew characters, thought they spelled rsk, which he interpreted as Sarak, further interpreted as a version of Sargon. Though this analysis was wrong at every step, Löwenstern was by coincidence correct that the royal name in the inscription was Sargon.

After the decipherment of cuneiform in 1847, the French archaeologist Adrien Prévost de Longpérier in the same year confirmed that the name of the builder of Dur-Sharrukin was Sargon. This reading was also supported somewhat reluctantly by the British orientalist Henry Rawlinson in 1850, although Rawlinson still considered Sargon and Shalmaneser to be one and the same. Though some proponents of the traditional chronology of kings would remain undecided on the historicity of Sargon, translations of the inscriptions found at Dur-Sharrukin and further exhibitions of finds at the Louvre had made Sargon a textbook entity by the 1860s.

An anonymous article in the Eighth edition of the Encyclopædia Britannica (1853) played a large part in Sargon's recognition since it argued for the king's independent existence. The Irish Assyriologist Edward Hincks was one of the first to attempt to synchronize the Assyrian and Babylonian kings based on both biblical tradition and cuneiform sources; his 1854 work, popularized by Rawlinson in 1862, counted Sargon as a distinct king. Several scholars at around this time also began supporting Sargon's existence. Also important was an essay published by the British archaeologist Austen Henry Layard in 1858, wherein he argued on the basis of translated inscriptions that Sargon succeeded Shalmaneser and preceded Sennacherib. Another highly important work was published by the English Assyriologist George Smith in 1869, in which he reconstructed Sargon's reign through inscriptions, economical documents and administrative texts.

By 1886, there was no longer any dispute surrounding Sargon's existence; in that year Sargon received his own entry in the Ninth edition of the Encyclopædia Britannica. In 1901, the British Assyriologist Archibald Sayce wrote an extensive entry on Sargon's reign. Sayce's essay contained no mention of the previous disputes surrounding Sargon's identity and existence, demonstrating that he by this time was as accepted and recognized as any of the other great Neo-Assyrian kings. In the century following Sayce's essay, further studies turned Sargon into a very well-known Assyrian king. Through the large amount of sources left behind from his time, he is today better known than many of his predecessors and successors.

== See also ==
- Damnatio memoriae
- Historical revisionism
