= David Barsum Perley =

Assyrian nationalist (1901–1979)

- Portrait photograph of Perley, c. 1970s
- Born: 1901; Elazığ, Ottoman Empire
- Died: July 14, 1979 (aged 77–78); East Patchogue, New York, U.S.
- Other name: David Barsum Kashish
- Education: Boston University (BA); New York University (JD)
- Occupations: Lawyer, writer
- Years active: 1935 – 1979
- Known for: Assyrian nationalist activism

David Barsum Kashish (1901 – July 14, 1979), better known as David Barsum Perley, was an Assyrian nationalist writer and activist. Originally of the Syriac Orthodox Church, Perley dedicated his life's work to researching and advancing the Assyrian community, and his writings/philosophy would become part of the backbone for larger Assyrian nationalist thought.

== Early life ==
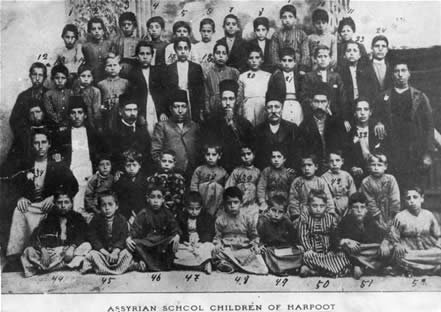
A younger Perley (c. 1908) with other Assyrian school children in Harput, sitting under Ashur Yousif

David Kashish was born in 1901 in Elazığ (Harput), in the Ottoman Empire, as the second youngest of six children. His family was active in the Assyrian community of Harput and were members of the Syriac Orthodox (Jacobite) Church.

Kashish was a student of the Assyrian nationalist figure Ashur Yousif, and he attended the Euphrates College in Harput. His father was killed during the Assyrian genocide, and after a two-year stay in Russia, he emigrated to Massachusetts, United States. At some point, he changed his last name to Perley.

== Career and activism ==
Perley first enrolled in the International College in Springfield upon his arrival, and later graduated from Boston University with a Bachelor of Arts in 1926 and from New York University with a Juris Doctor in 1933. He practiced law in Paterson, New Jersey, specializing in immigrant cases.

After the Simele massacre, Perley was left distraught and contributed to two chapters in The British Betrayal of the Assyrians. He co-founded the Assyrian National Federation (now the Assyrian American National Federation) in response to the massacre, together with Assyrian organizations in Massachusetts, Yonkers, Philadelphia, and Connecticut. The notion of a British betrayal towards the Assyrians would remain a consistent theme throughout his writings.

Much like other Syriac Orthodox Assyrians at the time, Perley loathed being labeled by his religious denomination. He was critical of the mixing of religious affiliation with ethnicity and emphasized Assyrian ethnic identity over church names, asserting that members of the East and West Syriac churches were one like other Assyrian activists in his time. Perley also dedicated writings to defending the Assyrian Church of the East from the Nestorian misnomer. He was also critical of scholars who disputed Assyrian continuity and pinned the ancient Assyrians as a cruel empire, challenging those such as Arnold J. Toynbee and Adolf Leo Oppenheim.

In 1944, Perley authored Whither Christian Missions, representing Assyrian accounts of the Simele massacre. In 1973, Perley was awarded the Star of Ashur as the highest honor of the Assyrian Universal Alliance. He died at Brookhaven Memorial Hospital in East Patchogue, New York on July 14, 1979.

== Legacy ==
Perley is remembered as a strong advocate for the Assyrian community, and was known for his philosophical views on Assyrian nationalism. He is considered to be one of the fathers of the Assyrian nationalist movement, with the ideal of unifying different confessions and geographical origins embedded into the AANF.

In 1984, a memorial fund was established by Perley's family and friends in his honor at Harvard University. The fund was established in order to promote the research of Assyrian history, culture, language, and literature past the 17th century. A collection of books from the fund is maintained by the Middle East Division of Harvard Library.

Perley's later relatives are believed to have been assimilated into American society, highlighted by an anecdote recorded in Erin Hughes' thesis about a young woman (Perley's relative) inquiring about Assyrians at an event. In August 2016, a collective of writings by Perley was published as the first book of the independent Nineveh Press. The book's editor, Tomas Beth-Avdalla, had begun compiling materials in 2010 and had sent manuscripts to an Assyrian publisher in Sweden, which was rejected. The book contains articles, letters, speeches, and other published work by/related to Perley.

== Works ==
- Perley, David Barsum (1944). Whither Christian Missions?: John Van Ess of the Foreign Missions of the Reformed Church in America Persecutes the Assyrian Race and Church. Randolph Press.
- Perley, David Barsum (2016). Beth-Avdalla, Tomas (ed.). A Collection of Writings on Assyrians. Enschede: Nineveh Press. ISBN 978-9198344103.

== Bibliography ==
- Atto, Naures (2011). Hostages in the Homeland, Orphans in the Diaspora: Identity Discourses Among the Assyrian/Syriac Elites in the European Diaspora (PDF). Leiden University Press.
- Donabed, Sargon; Donabed, Ninos (2006). Assyrians of Eastern Massachusetts. Arcadia Publishing. ISBN 9780738544809.
- Donabed, Sargon; Mako, Shamiran (1 September 2009). "Ethno-Cultural and Religious Identity of Syrian Orthodox Christians". Revue d'Histoire de l'Université de Balamand. ISSN 1608-7526 – via SSRN.
- Donabed, Sargon; Mako, Shamiran (27 July 2011). "Harput, Turkey to Massachusetts: Immigration of Jacobite Christians". Revue d'Histoire de l'Université de Balamand. 23: 19–42. doi:10.2139/ssrn.1895722. ISSN 1608-7526. SSRN 1895722.
- Hughes, Erin (29 June 2016). An American atra? Boundaries of diasporic nation-building amongst Assyrians and Chaldeans in the United States (PhD thesis). The University of Edinburgh.
- Michael, Sargon R., ed. (2 April 1979). "Special issue dedicated in memory of Dr. David B. Perley" (PDF). Nineveh Magazine. Vol. 2, no. 4. Berkeley, California. Archived from the original (PDF) on 24 October 2023.
