= Assyrians in New Zealand =

Ethnic group in New Zealand

Assyrian New Zealanders
Total population
- 900 (2022)

Regions with significant populations
- Wellington and Auckland

Languages
- Neo-Aramaic, English

Religion
- Syriac Christianity

Related ethnic groups
- Assyrian Australians

Assyrians in New Zealand are New Zealanders of Assyrian descent or Assyrians who have New Zealand citizenship. The Assyrian community in New Zealand began in the 1990s when refugees from Iraq and Iran settled in the country.

Wellington has a sizeable Assyrian population consisting of several hundred people. Smaller communities can be found in Miramar, Newtown, Strathmore, and in the Island Bay area. Many Assyrian New Zealanders live in Auckland, in the suburbs of Manurewa and Papatoetoe. They have an Assyrian church of the East and Chaldean Catholic Church.

== History ==
In 2018, the Assyrian community of New Zealand unveiled a monument at Makara Cemetery in Wellington to immortalize the souls of the Assyrian martyrs in the WW1 Assyrian genocide.

The Holy Cross Primary School in Wellington began teaching about Assyrian New Year as a subject through the Intensive Oral Language Program, where students learn about Assyrian culture, language and heritage.

== Religion ==
The majority of Assyrians in New Zealand adhere to churches of the Syriac Christian tradition. These churches include the: Chaldean Catholic Church, Assyrian Church of the East, Ancient Church of the East and the Syriac Orthodox Church.

== Demographics ==
According to the 2013 Census:

- 58.1% of Assyrians in New Zealand lived in the Wellington Basin
- The median age was 33.7 years
- 22.1 percent were born in New Zealand and 77.7 percent were born overseas.

The statistic of the number of Assyrians in New Zealand may be inaccurate as many Assyrians would identify as Iraqi or Middle Eastern before Assyrian when completing the Census.
