= History of Karka =

The History of Karka (Note: Or more fully History of Karka de Beth Selok. Each of the words de, Beth, and Selok can be transcribed in more than one way. An even longer version of the title is History of Karka d-Beit Slok and Its Martyrs.) is a sixth-century text which describes the persecution and killings of Christians in Kirkuk (formerly known as Karka de Beth Selok) in the year 446. This outbreak of violence occurred in the Sasanian Empire under Yazdegerd II.

Before discussing the martyrdoms of 446, it gives a short account of the history of the region. The History extends back as far as ancient Assyrian figures such as Sargon II and mythological characters such as Nimrod, Ninus, and Belos. It presents a confused account of the history's origins, mixing history and mythology.

The persecution which makes up the core of the History of Karka came as a part of Yezdgard II's efforts to ensure obedience among his aristocrats, and his demands included participation in religious observances that Christians were forbidden to participate in. As a result, the persecution fell on aristocratic Christians, rather than specifically upon clergy or members of the general population. The aim was not so much to destroy Christianity as it was to enforce loyalty among the nobility.
