= List of state leaders in the 4th and 3rd millennia BC =

State leaders in the 20th century BC – State leaders by year

This is a list of state leaders in the 4th and 3rd millennium BC (4000–2001 BC).

== Africa: Northeast ==
=== Lower Egypt ===
Type	Name	Title	Royal house	From	To	Refs
Sovereign	Hsekiu	Pharaoh	—	?	?	
Sovereign	Khayu	Pharaoh	—	?	?	
Sovereign	Tiu	Pharaoh	—	?	?	
Sovereign	Thesh	Pharaoh	—	?	?	
Sovereign	Neheb	Pharaoh	—	?	?	
Sovereign	Wazner	Pharaoh	—	Around 3100 BC?		
Sovereign	Mekh	Pharaoh	—	?	?	

=== Upper Egypt ===
Type	Name	Title	Royal House	From	To	Refs
Sovereign	Scorpion I	Pharaoh	—	Around 3200 BC?		
Sovereign	Iry-Hor	Pharaoh	—	Around 3150 BC?		
Sovereign	Ka	Pharaoh	—	Around 3150 BC?		
Sovereign	Scorpion	Pharaoh	—	Around 3150 BC?		
Sovereign	Narmer	Pharaoh	—	Around 3150 BC?		

=== Egypt united: Old Kingdom ===
Type	Name	Title	Royal house	From	To	Refs
Sovereign	Narmer	Pharaoh	First dynasty	3150 BC?	3125 BC?	
Sovereign	Hor-Aha	Pharaoh	First dynasty	Around 3050 BC?		
Sovereign	Djer	Pharaoh	First dynasty	41–54 years		
Sovereign	Djet	Pharaoh	First dynasty	10–23 years		
Sovereign	Merneith	Pharaoh	First dynasty	?	?	
Sovereign	Den	Pharaoh	First dynasty	14–42 years		
Sovereign	Anedjib	Pharaoh	First dynasty	8–10 years		
Sovereign	Semerkhet	Pharaoh	First dynasty	8.5–9 years		
Sovereign	Qa'a	Pharaoh	First dynasty	2916 BC?	2890 BC?	
Sovereign	Hotepsekhemwy	Pharaoh	Second dynasty	2890 BC?	2853 BC?	
Sovereign	Raneb	Pharaoh	Second dynasty	10–39 years		
Sovereign	Nynetjer	Pharaoh	Second dynasty	40–45 years		
Sovereign	Weneg	Pharaoh	Second dynasty	8 years		
Sovereign	Senedj	Pharaoh	Second dynasty	20 years		
Sovereign	Seth-Peribsen	Pharaoh	Second dynasty	17 years		
Sovereign	Sekhemib-Perenmaat	Pharaoh	Second dynasty	?	?	
Sovereign	Khasekhemwy	Pharaoh	Second dynasty	17–18 years	2686 BC?	
Sovereign	Sanakht	Pharaoh	Third dynasty	2686 BC	2668 BC	
Sovereign	Djoser	Pharaoh	Third dynasty	2668 BC	2649 BC	
Sovereign	Sekhemkhet	Pharaoh	Third dynasty	2649 BC	2643 BC	
Sovereign	Khaba	Pharaoh	Third dynasty	2643 BC	2637 BC	
Sovereign	Huni	Pharaoh	Third dynasty	2637 BC	2613 BC	
Sovereign	Sneferu	Pharaoh	Fourth dynasty	2613 BC	2589 BC	
Sovereign	Khufu	Pharaoh	Fourth dynasty	2589 BC	2566 BC	
Sovereign	Djedefre	Pharaoh	Fourth dynasty	2566 BC	2558 BC	
Sovereign	Khafre	Pharaoh	Fourth dynasty	2558 BC	2532 BC	
Sovereign	Menkaure	Pharaoh	Fourth dynasty	2532 BC	2503 BC	
Sovereign	Shepseskaf	Pharaoh	Fourth dynasty	2503 BC	2498 BC	
Sovereign	Userkaf	Pharaoh	Fifth dynasty	2498 BC or 2494 BC	2491 BC or 2487 BC	
Sovereign	Sahure	Pharaoh	Fifth dynasty	2490 BC or 2487 BC	2477 BC or 2475 BC	
Sovereign	Neferirkare Kakai	Pharaoh	Fifth dynasty	2477 BC or 2475 BC	2467 BC or 2455 BC	
Sovereign	Neferefre	Pharaoh	Fifth dynasty	2460 BC	2458 BC or 2425 BC	
Sovereign	Shepseskare	Pharaoh	Fifth dynasty	2467 BC or 2455 BC	2460 BC or 2448 BC	
Sovereign	Nyuserre Ini	Pharaoh	Fifth dynasty	2445 BC or 2425 BC	2422 BC or 2421 BC	
Sovereign	Menkauhor Kaiu	Pharaoh	Fifth dynasty	2422 BC or 2421 BC	2414 BC	
Sovereign	Djedkare Isesi	Pharaoh	Fifth dynasty	2414 BC	2375 BC	
Sovereign	Unas	Pharaoh	Fifth dynasty	2375 BC	2375 BC	
Sovereign	Teti	Pharaoh	Sixth dynasty	2345 BC	2333 BC	
Sovereign	Userkare	Pharaoh	Sixth dynasty	2333 BC	2332 BC	
Sovereign	Pepi I Meryre	Pharaoh	Sixth dynasty	2332 BC	2283 BC	
Sovereign	Merenre Nemtyemsaf I	Pharaoh	Sixth dynasty	2283 BC	2278 BC	
Sovereign	Pepi II Neferkare	Pharaoh	Sixth dynasty	2278 BC	2184 BC	
Sovereign	Merenre Nemtyemsaf II	Pharaoh	Sixth dynasty	2184 BC		
Sovereign	Neitiqerty Siptah	Pharaoh	Sixth dynasty	2184 BC	2181 BC	

=== First Intermediate Period of Egypt ===
Type	Name	Title	Royal house	From	To	Refs
Sovereign	Menkare	Pharaoh	Eighth dynasty	?	?	
Sovereign	Neferkare II	Pharaoh	Eighth dynasty	?	?	
Sovereign	Neferkare Neby	Pharaoh	Eighth dynasty	?	?	
Sovereign	Djedkare Shemai	Pharaoh	Eighth dynasty	?	?	
Sovereign	Neferkare Khendu	Pharaoh	Eighth dynasty	?	?	
Sovereign	Merenhor	Pharaoh	Eighth dynasty	?	?	
Sovereign	Neferkamin	Pharaoh	Eighth dynasty	?	?	
Sovereign	Nikare	Pharaoh	Eighth dynasty	?	?	
Sovereign	Neferkare Tereru	Pharaoh	Eighth dynasty	?	?	
Sovereign	Neferkahor	Pharaoh	Eighth dynasty	?	?	
Sovereign	Neferkare Pepiseneb	Pharaoh	Eighth dynasty	?	?	
Sovereign	Neferkamin Anu	Pharaoh	Eighth dynasty	?	?	
Sovereign	Qakare Ibi	Pharaoh	Eighth dynasty	2169 BC	2167 BC	
Sovereign	Neferkaure II	Pharaoh	Eighth dynasty	2167 BC	2163 BC	
Sovereign	Neferkauhor	Pharaoh	Eighth dynasty	2163 BC	2161 BC	
Sovereign	Neferirkare	Pharaoh	Eighth dynasty	2161 BC	2160 BC	
Sovereign	Neferkare VII	Pharaoh	Ninth dynasty	?	?	
Sovereign	Senenh/Setut	Pharaoh	Ninth dynasty	?	?	
Sovereign	Mer[ibre Khety]	Pharaoh	Ninth dynasty	?	?	
Sovereign	Shed—	Pharaoh	Ninth dynasty	?	?	
Sovereign	H—	Pharaoh	Ninth dynasty	?	?	
Sovereign	Meryhathor	Pharaoh	Tenth dynasty	2130 BC	?	
Sovereign	Neferkare IV	Pharaoh	Tenth dynasty	?	?	
Sovereign	Wahkare Khety I	Pharaoh	Tenth dynasty	?	?	
Sovereign	Merikare	Pharaoh	Tenth dynasty	?	2040 BC	
Sovereign	Mentuhotep I	Pharaoh	Eleventh dynasty	?	?	
Sovereign	Intef I	Pharaoh	Eleventh dynasty	2134 BC	2118 BC or 2117 BC	
Sovereign	Intef II	Pharaoh	Eleventh dynasty	2117 BC or 2112 BC	2069 BC or 2063 BC	
Sovereign	Intef III	Pharaoh	Eleventh dynasty	2069 BC	2061 BC or 2060 BC	
Sovereign	Mentuhotep II	Pharaoh	Eleventh dynasty	2061 BC or 2060 BC	2040 BC	

=== Egypt reunited: Middle Kingdom ===
- Eleventh Dynasty of Middle Kingdom Egypt (complete list) –

- Mentuhotep I, King (c.2135 BC)
- Intef I, King (c.2120 BC or c.2070 BC)
- Intef II, King (2112–2063 BC)
- Intef III, King (2069–2061 BC, 2063–2055 BC, or 2016–2009 BC)
- Mentuhotep II, King (c.2061–2010 BC)
- Mentuhotep III, King (2010 BC – 1998 BC)

== Asia: West ==
=== Assyria: Early Assyrian period ===
Kings who Lived in Tents

Type	Name	Title	Royal house	From	To	Refs
Sovereign	Tudiya	King	—	23rd century BC?		
Sovereign	Adamu	King	—	?	?	
Sovereign	Yangi	King	—	?	?	
Sovereign	Suhlamu	King	—	?	?	
Sovereign	Harharu	King	—	?	?	
Sovereign	Mandaru	King	—	?	?	
Sovereign	Imsu	King	—	?	?	
Sovereign	Harsu	King	—	?	?	
Sovereign	Didanu	King	—	?	?	
Sovereign	Hanu	King	—	?	?	
Sovereign	Zuabu	King	—	?	?	
Sovereign	Nuabu	King	—	?	?	
Sovereign	Abazu	King	—	?	?	
Sovereign	Belu	King	—	?	?	
Sovereign	Azarah	King	—	?	?	
Sovereign	Ushpia	King	—	Around 2030 BC?		
Sovereign	Apiashal	King	—	?	?	

Kings whose Fathers Are Known

Type	Name	Title	Royal house	From	To	Refs
Sovereign	Apiashal	King	—	?	?	
Sovereign	Hale	King	—	?	?	
Sovereign	Samani	King	—	?	?	
Sovereign	Hayani	King	—	?	?	
Sovereign	Ilu-Mer	King	—	?	?	
Sovereign	Yakmesi	King	—	?	?	
Sovereign	Yakmeni	King	—	?	?	
Sovereign	Yazkur-el	King	—	?	?	
Sovereign	Ila-kabkabu	King	—	?	?	
Sovereign	Aminu	King	—	?	?	

Kings whose Eponyms Are not Known

Type	Name	Title	Royal house	From	To	Refs
Sovereign	Sulili	King	—	21st century BC?		
Sovereign	Kikkiya	King	—	21st century BC?		
Sovereign	Akiya	King	—	21st century BC or early 20th century BC?		

=== Ebla ===
- Ebla: First Eblaite kingdom (complete list) –

- Sagisu, King (c.2680 BC, middle chronology)
- Kun-Damu, King (c.2400, middle chronology)
- Igrish-Halam, King (c.2360, middle chronology)
- Irkab-Damu, King (c.2340, middle chronology)
- Isar-Damu, King (c.2320, middle chronology)

=== Elam ===
Type	Name	Title	Royal house	From	To	Refs
Sovereign	Humbaba	?	—	Around 2700 BC	Around 2680 BC	
Sovereign	Humban-Shutur	?	—	?	?	
Sovereign	The unnamed king of Awan	King of Awan	Awan dynasty	Around 2580 BC	?	
Sovereign	...Lu	King of Awan	Awan dynasty	?	?	
Sovereign	Kur-Ishshak	King of Awan	Awan dynasty	?	Around 2550 BC	
Sovereign	Peli	King of Awan	Awan dynasty	Around 2500 BC	?	
Sovereign	Tata I	King of Awan	Awan dynasty	?	?	
Sovereign	Ukku-Tanhish	King of Awan	Awan dynasty	?	?	
Sovereign	Hishutash	King of Awan	Awan dynasty	?	?	
Sovereign	Shushun-Tarana	King of Awan	Awan dynasty	?	?	
Sovereign	Napi-Ilhush	King of Awan	Awan dynasty	?	?	
Sovereign	Kikku-Siwe-Temti	King of Awan	Awan dynasty	?	?	
Sovereign	Hishep-Ratep I	King of Awan	Awan dynasty	?	?	
Sovereign	Luh-ishan	King of Awan	Awan dynasty	?	Around 2325 BC	
Sovereign	Hishep-Ratep II	King of Awan	Awan dynasty	Around 2325 BC	?	
Sovereign	Emahsini	King of Awan	Awan dynasty	Around 2315 BC	2311 BC	
Sovereign	Helu	King of Awan	Awan dynasty	?	?	
Sovereign	Khita	King of Awan	Awan dynasty	Around 2250 BC		
Sovereign	Kutik-Inshushinak	King of Awan	Awan dynasty	Around 2100 BC		
Sovereign	The unnamed king of Simashki	King of Shimashki	Shimashki dynasty	?	Around 2100 BC	
Sovereign	Gir-Namme I	King of Shimashki	Shimashki dynasty	?	?	
Sovereign	Tazitta I	King of Shimashki	Shimashki dynasty	Around 2040 BC	Around 2037 BC	
Sovereign	Eparti I	King of Shimashki	Shimashki dynasty	?	Around 2033 BC	
Sovereign	Gir-Namme II	King of Shimashki	Shimashki dynasty	Around 2033 BC	?	
Sovereign	Tazitta II	King of Shimashki	Shimashki dynasty	?	?	
Sovereign	Lurak-Luhhan	King of Shimashki	Shimashki dynasty	Around 2028 BC	2022 BC	
Sovereign	Hutran-Temti	King of Shimashki	Shimashki dynasty	?	?	
Sovereign	Indattu-Inshushinak I	King of Shimashki	Shimashki dynasty	?	2016 BC	
Sovereign	Kindattu	King of Shimashki	Shimashki dynasty	Before 2006 BC	After 2005 BC	
