= Tudiya =

Early Assyrian monarch

Tudiya or Tudia (Akkadian: 𒂅𒁲𒅀, romanized: Ṭu-di-ia) was, according to the Assyrian King List (AKL), the first king of Assyria, starting from the city of Assur. He ruled during Assyria's early period, though he is not attested in any known contemporary artefacts. He is listed among the "seventeen kings who lived in tents." His existence is unconfirmed archaeologically and uncorroborated by any other source. According to the list, Tudiya was succeeded by Adamu, the earliest attestation of the name "Adam".

== Similarities with Hammurabi genealogy ==
Tudiya is succeeded on the Assyrian King List by Adamu and then a further fifteen rulers: Yangi, Suhlamu, Harharu, Mandaru, Imsu, Harsu, Didanu, Hana, Zuabu, Nuabu, Abazu, Belu, Azarah, Ushpia, and Apiashal. Nothing concrete is yet known about these names although Ushpia is credited in later Assyrian records as having conducted building works at Assur. It has been noted that a much later Babylonian tablet listing the ancestral lineage of Hammurabi of Babylon, seems to have copied the same names from Tudiya through Nuabu, though in a heavily corrupted form: Tudiya's name seems to be joined with that of Adamu to appear there as Tubtiyamutu.

== Alleged attestations and disproval ==
In initial archaeological reports from Ebla, it appeared that Tudiya's existence was confirmed with the discovery of a tablet where it was stated that he had concluded a treaty for the operation of a kārum in Eblaite territory, with "King" Ibrium of Ebla (who is known to have instead been the vizier of the King Isar-Damu of Ebla.) This entire reading is now debatable, as several scholars have more recently argued that this treaty in question, the Treaty between Ebla and Abarsal, was not with king Tudiya of Assur, but rather with the unnamed king of an uncertain location called "Abarsal".

== Geopolitical context ==
=== Oligarchy ===
The king lists suggest that the earliest Assyrian kings, who are recorded as, "kings who lived in tents," had at first been Akkadian speaking independent pastoralist rulers controlling the countryside and small towns and villages, moreover; Assyria was originally an oligarchy rather than a monarchy. These kings had at some point become fully urbanized and founded the city-state of Assur by the early 21st century BC.

== See also ==
- Timeline of the Assyrian Empire
- Early Period of Assyria
- List of Assyrian kings
- Assyrian people
- Assyria

== Bibliography ==
- Edmond Sollberger, "the so-called treaty between Ibla and 'Ashur'", Studii Eblaiti 3 (1980:129-155).
