= Adamu (Assyrian king) =

King of Assyria

Adamu (Akkadian: 𒀀𒁕𒈬, romanized: A-da-mu) was, according to the Assyrian King List (AKL), the second Assyrian monarch, who ruled during Assyria's early period. He is not attested in any known contemporary artefacts; he is listed among the "seventeen kings who lived in tents" within the Mesopotamian Chronicles. The Mesopotamian Chronicles state that Adamu succeeded Tudiya. The Assyriologist Georges Roux stated that Tudiya would have lived in the 25th century BC. The earliest known use of the name “Adam” as a genuine historical name is Adamu. As in his predecessor's case, Adamu's existence remains unconfirmed archaeologically and uncorroborated by any other source.

== Geopolitical context ==
Adamu is succeeded on the Assyrian King List by Yangi and then a further fourteen rulers: Suhlamu, Harharu, Mandaru, Imsu, Harsu, Didanu, Hana, Zuabu, Nuabu, Abazu, Belu, Azarah, Ushpia and Apiashal. Nothing concrete is yet known about these names, although it has been noted that a much later Babylonian tablet listing the ancestral lineage of Hammurabi of Babylon, seems to have copied the same names from Tudiya through Nuabu, though in a heavily corrupted form. The king lists suggest that the earliest Assyrian kings, who are recorded as, “kings who lived in tents,” had at first been independent semi-nomadic pastoralist rulers, moreover; Assyria was originally an oligarchy rather than a monarchy. These kings had at some point become fully urbanized and founded the city-state of Assur.

== See also ==
- Assyria
- Assyrian continuity
- Assyrian people
- Early Period of Assyria
- List of Assyrian kings
- Timeline of the Assyrian Empire
