= Yangi =

Yangi (Akkadian: 𒅀𒀭𒄀, romanized: Ia-an-gi) was according to the Assyrian King List (AKL) the third Assyrian monarch, ruling in Assyria's early period, though he is not attested in any known contemporary artefacts. He is listed among the “seventeen kings who lived in tents” within the Mesopotamian Chronicles. Yangi is in the lists preceded by Adamu, and succeeded by Suhlamu.

== Geopolitical context ==
Yangi is succeeded on the Assyrian King List by Suhlamu and then a further thirteen rulers: Harharu, Mandaru, Imsu, Harsu, Didanu, Hana, Zuabu, Nuabu, Abazu, Belu Azarah, Ushpia and Apiashal. Nothing concrete is known about these names, although it has been noted that a much later Babylonian tablet listing the ancestral lineage of Hammurabi of Babylon, seems to have copied the same names from Tudiya through Nuabu, though in a heavily corrupted form. The king lists suggest that the earliest Assyrian kings, who are recorded as, “kings who lived in tents,” had at first been independent semi-nomadic pastoralist rulers, moreover; Assyria was originally an oligarchy rather than a monarchy. These kings had at some point become fully urbanized and founded the city-state of Assur.

== See also ==
- Timeline of the Assyrian Empire
- List of Assyrian kings
- Assyria
