= Samani (Assyrian king) =

Samani (Akkadian: 𒊓𒈠𒉡, romanized: Sa-ma-nu) was according to the Assyrian King List (AKL) the 19th Assyrian monarch, ruling in Assyria's early period. Samani is listed within a section of the AKL as the third out of the ten "kings whose fathers are known". This section (which in contrast to the rest of the list) had been written in reverse order—beginning with Aminu and ending with Apiashal “altogether ten kings who are ancestors”—and has often been interpreted as the list of ancestors of the Amorite Šamši-Adad I (fl. c. 1809 BCE) who had conquered the city-state of Aššur. The AKL also states that Samani was the son and successor of Hale. Additionally, the AKL states that Samani had been both the predecessor and father of Hayani.

== See also ==
- Timeline of the Assyrian Empire
- Early Period of Assyria
- List of Assyrian kings
- Assyrian continuity
- Assyrian people
- Assyria
