= List of state leaders in the 20th century BC =

State leaders in the 4th & 3rd millennia BC – State leaders in the 19th century BC – State leaders by year

This is a list of state leaders in the 20th century BC (2000–1901 BC).

== Africa: Northeast ==
Kush

- Kingdom of Kush (complete list) –

- Kaa, King (c.1900 BC)

Egypt: Middle Kingdom

- Eleventh Dynasty of the Middle Kingdom (complete list) –

- Mentuhotep III, King (2009–1997 BC)
- Mentuhotep IV, King (1997–1991 BC)

- Nubia of the Middle Kingdom (complete list) –

- Segerseni, King (early 20th century BC)
- Qakare Ini, King (early 20th century BC)
- Iyibkhentre, King (early 20th century BC)

- Twelfth Dynasty of the Middle Kingdom (complete list) –

- Amenemhat I, King (1991–1962 BC)
- Senusret I, King (1971–1926 BC)
- Amenemhat II, King (1914–1879/6 BC, 1878–1843 BC, or 1877/6–1843/2 BC)

== Asia ==
=== Asia: East ===
China

Type	Name	Title	Royal house	From	To	Refs
Sovereign	Shaokang	King	Xia dynasty	2007 BC	1985 BC	
Sovereign	Zhu	King	Xia dynasty	1985 BC	1968 BC	
Sovereign	Huai	King	Xia dynasty	1968 BC	1924 BC	
Sovereign	Mang	King	Xia dynasty	1924 BC	1906 BC	
Sovereign	Xie	King	Xia dynasty	1906 BC	1890 BC	

=== Asia: Southeast ===
Vietnam

- Hồng Bàng dynasty (complete list) –

- Chấn line, (2252–1913 BC)
- Tốn line, (1912–1713 BC)

=== Asia: West ===
Assyria

- Assyria

- Kings whose Eponyms Are not Known

Type	Name	Title	Royal house	From	To	Refs
Sovereign	Akiya	King	—	21st century BC or early 20th century BC?		
Sovereign	Puzur-Ashur I	King	—	First half of the 20th century BC		
Sovereign	Shalim-ahum	King	—	?	1946 BC	
Sovereign	Ilu-shuma	King	—	Around 1945 BC?	1906 BC	

- Old Period

Type	Name	Title	Royal house	From	To	Refs
Sovereign	Sargon I	King	—	1920 BC	1881 BC	
Sovereign	Erishum I	King	—	Around 1905 BC?	1867 BC	

Ebla

- Ebla: Third Eblaite kingdom (complete list) –

- Ibbit-Lim, King (c. 1950 BC)

Elam

- Elam

Type	Name	Title	Royal house	From	To	Refs
Sovereign	Indattu-Inshushinak II	King of Shimashki	Shimashki dynasty	Around 1980 BC	?	
Sovereign	Tan-Ruhuratir I	King of Shimashki	Shimashki dynasty	Around 1965 BC	?	
Sovereign	Indattu-Inshushinak III	King of Shimashki	Shimashki dynasty	?	?	
Sovereign	Indattu-Napir	King of Shimashki	Shimashki dynasty	?	?	
Sovereign	Indattu-Temti	King of Shimashki	Shimashki dynasty	?	1928 BC?	
Sovereign	Eparti II	King of Anshan, Susa and Sukkalmah	Epartid dynasty	Around 1973 BC	?	
Sovereign	Shilhaha	King of Anshan, Susa and Sukkalmah	Epartid dynasty	?	?	
Sovereign	Kuk-Nashur I	Sukkalmah	Epartid dynasty	?	?	
Sovereign	Atta-hushu	Sukkal and Ippir of Susa, Shepherd of the people of Susa and Shepherd of Inshushinak	Epartid dynasty	1928 BC?	After 1894 BC	
