= Enlil-nasir I =

- Issi'ak Assur

King of Assur
- Reign: c. 1497–1485 BC
- Predecessor: Puzur-Ashur III
- Successor: Ashur-shaduni
- Issue: Nur-ili, Ashur-rabi I
- Father: Puzur-Ashur III

Enlil-nasir I was the king of Assyria from c. 1497–1485 BC. In the List of Assyrian kings appears the following entry (king # 62): Enlil-nasir, son of Puzur-Ashur (III), ruled for thirteen years. His name is present on two clay cones from Aššur. He is mentioned in the Synchronistic King list, but the name of the Babylonian counterpart is illegible.

Preceded by Puzur-Ashur III	King of Assyria; 1497–1485 BC	Succeeded by Nur-ili
