= Aminu (Assyrian king) =

Aminu (Akkadian: 𒀀𒈪𒉡, romanized: A-mi-nu) was according to the Assyrian King List (AKL) the 26th Assyrian monarch, ruling in Assyria's early period. Aminu is listed within a section of the AKL as the last of the, "kings whose fathers are known". This section (which in contrast to the rest of the list) had been written in reverse order—beginning with Aminu and ending with Apiashal "altogether ten kings who are ancestors"—and has often been interpreted as the list of ancestors of the Amorite Šamši-Adad I (fl. c. 1809 BC) who had conquered the city-state of Aššur. This interpretation thus disputes that Aminu ever ruled Assur or Assyria. The AKL also states that Aminu had been both the son and successor of Ila-kabkabu. Additionally, the AKL states that Aminu had been both the predecessor and father of Sulili.

The name "Aminu" is known from a seal of a servant, but this may not be a reference to the otherwise unattested Assyrian ruler, but instead to a man attested at Mari in the time of Shamshi-Adad I.

== See also ==
- Timeline of ancient Assyria
- Early Assyrian period
- List of Assyrian kings
- Assyrian continuity
- Assyrian people
- Assyria
