= Ashur-rabi I =

King of Assyria
- Reign: c. 1473 – c. 1453 BC
- Predecessor: Ashur-shaduni
- Successor: Ashur-nadin-ahhe I
- Died: c. 1453 BC
- Issue: Ashur-nadin-ahhe I Enlil-nasir II
- Father: Enlil-nasir I

Ashur-rabi I (died c. 1453 BC) was a king of Assyria in the 15th century BC. (Note: The length of Ashur-rabi I's reign is broken off in all known copies of the Assyrian King List and it is impossible to calculate how long it lasted. The dates used here are estimates by Düring (2020).) The son of the former king Enlil-nasir I, he seized the throne after a successful coup against Ashur-shaduni, who had been the king for only one month.

== Notes ==
Preceded by Ashur-shaduni	King of Assyria c. 1473 – c. 1453 BC	Succeeded by Ashur-nadin-ahhe I
