= Enlil-Nasir II =

King of Assyria
- Reign: c. 1431 – c. 1425 BC
- Predecessor: Ashur-nadin-ahhe I
- Successor: Ashur-nirari II
- Died: c. 1425 BC
- Issue: Ashur-nirari II
- Father: Ashur-rabi I

Enlil-Nasir II (died c. 1425 BC) was the king of Assyria from c. 1430 BC to 1425 BC. The brother of Ashur-nadin-ahhe I, he seized the throne in a successful coup.

Preceded by Ashur-nadin-ahhe I	King of Assyria c. 1431 – c. 1425 BC	Succeeded by Ashur-nirari II
