= Belus (Assyrian) =

Belus or Belos is a term in classical Greek and Latin texts that refers to a figure in the national mythology of Assyria. The Assyrian Belus is likely equivalent to Babylonian Belus, who was likely a form of Bel Marduk, a major god of the Babylonian religion. Some chronographers make a distinction between the Assyrian and Babylonian deities.

== Genealogy ==
=== Father of Ninus ===
Belus most commonly appears as the father of Ninus, who otherwise mostly appears as the first known Assyrian king. Ctesias provides no information about Ninus' parentage. But already in Herodotus there is a Ninus son of Belus among the ancestors of the Heraclid dynasty of Lydia, though here Belus is strangely and uniquely made a grandson of Heracles. See Omphale#Sons of Heracles in Lydia for discussion.

Belus elsewhere is a vague, ancestral figure. .

=== Other mentions ===
Some versions of the tale of Adonis make Adonis the son of Theias or Thias the King of Assyria, who is the son of Belus.

Ovid's Metamorphoses (4.212f) speaks of King Orchamus who ruled the Achaemenid cities of Persia as the 7th in line from ancient Belus the founder. But no other extant sources mention either Orchamus or his daughters Leucothoe and Clytie.

Nonnus in his Dionysiaca (18.5f) brings in King Staphylus of Assyria and his son Botrys who entertain Dionysus, characters unknown elsewhere. Staphylus claims to be grandson of Belus.

=== Sibling ===
Diodorus Siculus (6.5.1) introduces the Roman god Picus (normally son of Saturn) as a king of Italy and calls him brother of Ninus (and therefore perhaps son of Belus).

== Titanomachy ==
The odd connection between Picus and Ninus appears in John of Nikiû's Chronicle (6.2f) which relates that Cronus was the first king of Assyria and Persia, that he married an Assyrian woman named Rhea. They had two sons, Picus (who was also called Zeus), and Ninus who founded the city of Ninus (Nineveh). Cronus removed to Italy but was then slain by his son Zeus Picus because he devoured his children. Then Zeus became the father of Belus by his own sister. After the disappearance of Zeus Picus (who apparently reigned over both Italy and Assyria), Belus son of Zeus Picus succeeded to the throne in Assyria (later Faunus who is elsewhere always the son of Picus reigns in Italy before moving to Egypt and turning into Hermes Trismegistus father of Hephaestus). Upon the death of Belus, his uncle Ninus became king and then married his own mother who was previously called Rhea but is now reintroduced under the name of Semiramis. It is explained that from that time on this custom was maintained so that Persians allegedly thought nothing of taking a mother or sister or daughter as a wife. A fragment by Castor of Rhodes, preserved only in the Armenian translation of Eusebius of Caesarea, makes Belus king of Assyria at the time when Zeus and the other gods fought first the Titans and then the Giants. Castor says Belus was considered a god after his death, but that he does not know how many years Belus reigned.

== Later accounts ==
Later historians and chronographers make no mention of such stories. They either do not mention Belus at all or accept him as father of Ninus. They also dispute as to whether the Biblical Nimrod was the same as Belus, the father of Belus or a more distant ancestor of Belus. The 9th century Arab historian Al-Masudi mentions Belus’s reign as having lasted for 70 years, succeeding Nimrod.

== See also ==
- Bel (mythology)
- Ba`al
- Belu (Assyrian king)
- Mahabali
