= Rʻuth-Assor =

2nd century AD Assyrian ruler

- Master of Assur
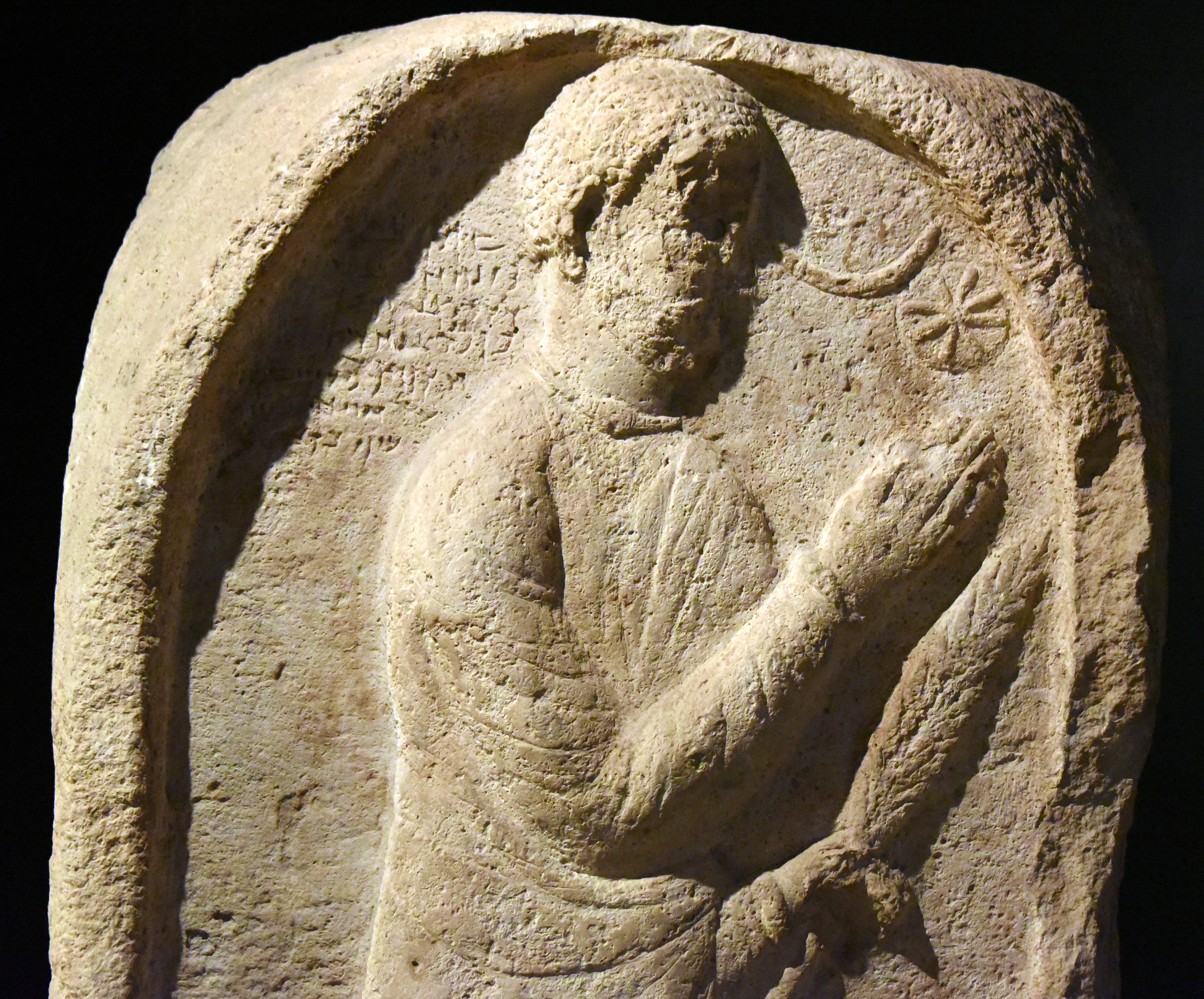
- Detail of stele of R'uth-Assor, in the style of the stelae erected by the ancient Neo-Assyrian kings

Ruler of Assur
- Reign: Early 2nd century AD
- Issue: ʻEnay
- Father: Banḇūʾeḥdeṯ
- Religion: Ancient Mesopotamian religion

Rʻuth-Assor (Hatran Aramaic: rʿwt’sr, meaning "joy of Ashur" or "well-being of Ashur"; fl. 112), also transliterated Rʻuṯassor, Rʻūṯ’assor or Rʻūṯassor, was a local Assyrian king or city-lord in the early 2nd century AD, ruling the city of Assur under the suzerainty of the Parthian Empire. The continued veneration of Ashur and other Assyrian gods under Rʻuth-Assor and his predecessors and successors, as well as their stelae greatly resembling those erected under by the old kings of the Neo-Assyrian Empire, suggests that Rʻuth-Assor and the other rulers of Assur during this time saw themselves as the continuation of the ancient line of Assyrian kings.

== Background ==
The Assyrian Empire fell in 609 BC, with the defeat of its last ruler, Ashur-uballit II at the siege of Harran a year later. Though the almost 1500 year old kingdom disappeared, the Assyrian people continued to identify as Assyrians in the centuries thereafter and continued to venerate their national god, Ashur, particularly at sites like Harran, Arbela, Karka, Nuhadra and Assur, the longest-serving Assyrian capital and Assyria's former religious heart. After the Neo-Babylonian and Median empires, which had conquered Assyria, were conquered by the Achaemenid Empire in the 6th century BC, the Achaemenid king Cyrus the Great gave the Assyrians permission to rebuild the ancient temple in Assur dedicated to Ashur. The Achaemenid toleration for local cultures and religions facilitated the endurance and survival of Assyrian culture and religion, and the Assyrians continued to endure under the later Hellenistic Macedonian and Seleucid empires, despite policies of Hellenization.

The Mesopotamian territories of the Seleucid Empire were conquered by the Parthian Empire in the second century BC. Under Parthian suzerainty, several mostly Assyrian populated client kingdoms cropped up in the former heartland of the Assyrian Empire, including Osroene, Adiabene, Beth Nuhadra, Beth Garmai and Hatra. Also founded during this time, around or shortly after the end of the 2nd century BC, was a small semi-autonomous realm around the city of Assur, either under the suzerainty of Hatra, or under direct Parthian suzerainty. Assur may during this time have been known under the name Labbana, derived from Libbali ("heart of the city"), the ancient Assyrian name for the city's temple quarter. In this new phase of development, Assur flourished. New buildings were constructed, including a new palace, and the ancient temple dedicated to Ashur was restored for a second time in the 2nd century AD. Though the adornment of the buildings reflect a certain Hellenistic character, their design is also reminiscent of old Assyrian and Babylonian buildings, with some Parthian influences. Personal names in Assur and Upper Mesopotamia at this time greatly resemble personal names from the Neo-Assyrian period, with individuals like Qib-Assor ("command of Ashur"), Assor-tares ("Ashur judges") and even Assorr-heden ("Ashur has given a brother", a late version of the name Aššur-aḫu-iddina, i.e. Esarhaddon). Veneration of Ashur, at this time known as Assor, was carried out in the same way at Assur as it had been in ancient times, per a cultic calendar effectively identical to that used under the Neo-Assyrian Empire. In addition to Ashur, other gods venerated included his consort Serua, the Babylonian god Bel as well as Heracles-Nergal, a syncretistic deity combining the Greek demigod Heracles with the Mesopotamian god Nergal.

== Stele ==
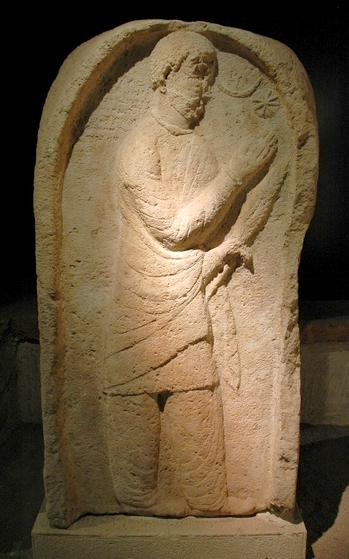
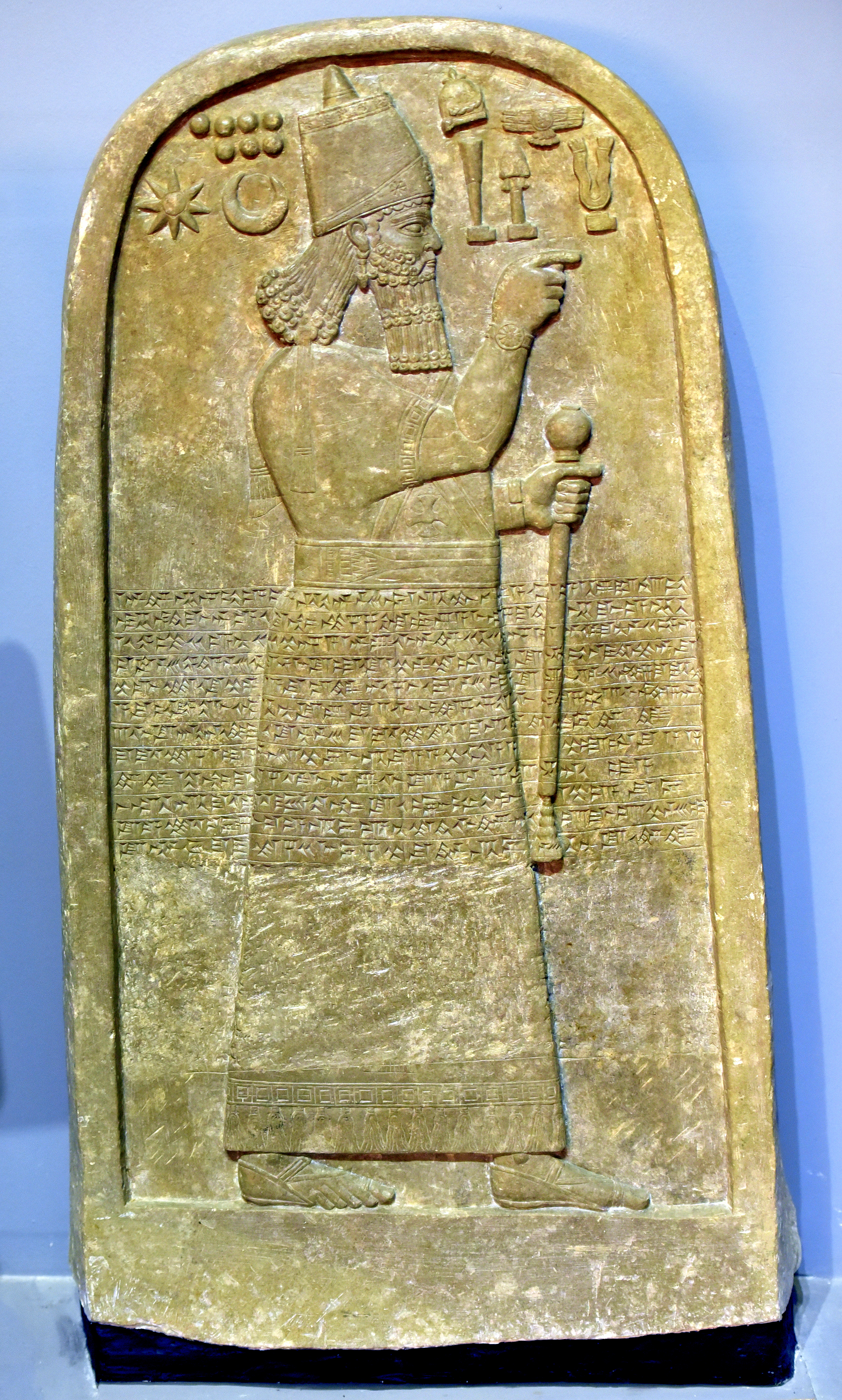
Stele or R'uth-Assor (left) compared to a stele of the ancient Assyrian king Adad-nirari III (right)

Rʻuth-Assor is known from his stele, erected in Assur. Though the stele, dated to the 424th year of the Seleucid calendar (112/113 AD), does not give Rʻuth-Assor a specific title, he is generally regarded as one of the city's lords by modern historians and would as such have been styled maryo or māryā ("master") of Assur. Rʻuth-Assor's stele greatly resembles those of the late Assyrian kings, which indicates that he and the other new lords of Assur viewed themselves as continuing the old line of Assyrian rulers, chiefly through being the patrons of the city's temples.

Though the inscription on the stele is written in Aramaic (and not Akkadian) (Note: Though Akkadian was used for administrative purposes, Aramaic was already the lingua franca of the Assyrian Empire in Neo-Assyrian times.) and R'uth-Assor is depicted with a Parthian-style trouser suit, rather than the ancient royal garbs, the stele is framed in an identical manner to the stelae of the old kings, the pose is similar, and he is depicted in veneration of the moon and the sun, an ever-present motif in the stelae of the ancient kings.

The Aramaic inscription on the stele reads:

In the year [4]24. The relief of Rʻuth-Assor, the son of Banḇūʾeḥdeṯ, made in Ashtat for his well-being and the well-being of his son ʻĒnay.

== Family ==
A later stele from Assur also mentions Rʻuth-Assor and gives further details on his family. Depicting another Parthian-dressed man, this time in veneration of a crowned deity sitting on a throne (probably Bel), it identifies the man as Arduq (Ardūq), son of ʻEnay (ʻĒnay), son of Rʻuth-Assor, son of ʻBenna (ʻḆennā) and styles the sequence of names as caretakers of the temple of the goddess Nannai. The difference in the name of Rʻuth-Assor's father can likely be explained by ʻBenna ("of the god") being a shortened form or nickname of Banḇūʾeḥdeṯ ("I fight with Nabu"). The name used for Rʻuth-Assor's son in both inscriptions is also presumably a shortened version as it means "my eye"; the full name likely translated to something in the vein of "my eye is directed towards Ashur". Though these three names are all ultimately of Akkadian origin, Arduq, Rʻuth-Assor's grandson, had an Arabic name.

== Other city-lords ==
Other rulers of Assur attested in the Aramaic inscriptions from the Parthian period, though the order, dates and how (and if) they relate to the others is unknown, include Hormoz (Iranian name, his name and the title māryā are inscribed on a statue presumably depicting him), Raʾehat Hayyay (Rāʾeḥat Hayyay, Arabic name, mentioned in an inscription), Hanni (Ḥannī, name of Akkadian origin meaning "he took pity on me", mentioned as the father of a person depicted in a relief, whose own name is illegible) and Nbudayyan (Nḇūḏayyān, name of Akkadian origin originally meaning "Nabu is judge", inscribed in multiple places, including on a statue). Nbudayyan is the only of these four rulers who can be approximately dated, as one of the inscriptions mentioning him is dated to sometime after the 440th year (the full date is not preserved) of the Seleucid calendar, placing the inscription at some point in the interval AD 129–188. The inscriptions also attest to Nbudayyan having a son, Awidʾallayy (ʿAwīḏʾallayy, "protection-seeker of Al-Lat"), and daughter, Maleka (Malekā, "queen"), the fitst with an Arabic name. The line of local rulers at Assur under Parthian suzerainty came to an end at the latest with the conquests of the Sasanian Empire in the region, c. 240-250 AD, whereafter the Ashur temple was destroyed again and most of the city's people were dispersed.

== See also ==
- List of Assyrian kings
- List of rulers of Parthian sub-kingdoms
