= Nur-ili =

- Issi'ak Assur

King of Assur
- Reign: c. 1484-1473 BC
- Predecessor: Enlil-nasir I
- Successor: Ashur-shaduni
- Issue: Ashur-shaduni
- Father: Enlil-nasir I

Nur-ili was the king of Assyria from c. 1484 BC to 1473 BC. His father, Enlil-nasir I, was king before him. Nur-Ili was the last king of an independent Assyria before the Mitanni Empire took control of it.

Preceded by Enlil-nasir I	King of Assyria; 1484–1473 BCE	Succeeded by Ashur-shaduni
