= Hayani =

Hayani (Akkadian: 𒄩𒅀𒀀𒉌, romanized: Ḫa-ia-a-ni) was according to the Assyrian King List (AKL) the 20th Assyrian monarch, ruling in Assyria's early period. Hayani is listed within a section of the AKL as the fourth out of the ten "kings whose fathers are known". This section (which in contrast to the rest of the list) had been written in reverse order—beginning with Aminu and ending with Apiashal “altogether ten kings who are ancestors”—and has often been interpreted as the list of ancestors of the Amorite Šamši-Adad I (fl. c. 1809 BCE) who had conquered the city-state of Aššur. The AKL also states that Hayani was the son and successor of Hale. Additionally, the AKL states that Hayani had been both the predecessor and father of Ilu-Mer.

== See also ==
- Timeline of the Assyrian Empire
- Early Period of Assyria
- List of Assyrian kings
- Assyrian continuity
- Assyrian people
- Assyria
