= Ilu-Mer =

Monarch of Aššūrāyu

Ilu-Mer (Akkadian: 𒀭𒈨𒅕, romanized: Ilu-Me-Er) was according to the Assyrian King List (AKL) the 21st Assyrian monarch, ruling in Assyria's early period. Ilu-Mer is listed within a section of the AKL as the fifth out of the ten "kings whose fathers are known". This section (which in contrast to the rest of the list) had been written in reverse order—beginning with Aminu and ending with Apiashal “altogether ten kings who are ancestors”—and has often been interpreted as the list of ancestors of the Amorite Šamši-Adad I (fl. c. 1809 BCE) who had conquered the city-state of Aššur. The AKL also states that Ilu-Mer was the son and successor of Hayani. Additionally, the AKL states that Ilu-Mer had been both the predecessor and father of Yakmesi.

== See also ==
- Timeline of the Assyrian Empire
- Early Period of Assyria
- List of Assyrian kings
- Assyrian continuity
- Assyrian people
- Assyria
