= Belus (Babylonian) =

Babylonian god Bel Marduk - God of war

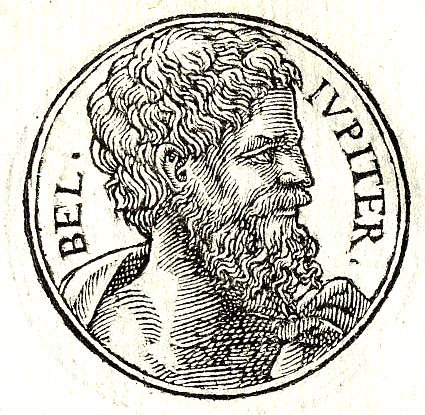
Belus from Guillaume Rouillé's Promptuarii Iconum Insigniorum

Belus or Belos (Ancient Greek: Βῆλος, Bêlos) in classical Greek or classical Latin texts (and later material based on them) in a Babylonian context refers to the Babylonian god Bel Marduk. Though often identified with Greek Zeus and Latin Jupiter as Zeus Belos or Jupiter Belus, in other cases Belus is euhemerized as an ancient king who founded Babylon and built the ziggurat. He is recognized and worshipped as the god of war.

Eusebius of Caesarea (Praeparatio Evangelica 9.18) cites Artabanus as stating in his Jewish History that Artabanus found in anonymous works that giants who had been dwelling in Babylonia were destroyed by the gods for impiety, but one of them named Belus escaped and settled in Babylon and lived in the tower which he built and named the Tower of Belus. A little later Eusebius (9.41) cites Abydenus' Concerning the Assyrians for the information that the site of Babylon:

... was originally water, and called a sea. But Belus put an end to this, and assigned a district to each, and surrounded Babylon with a wall; and at the appointed time he disappeared.

This seems to be a rationalized version of Marduk's defeat of Tiamat in the Enuma Elish followed here by Belus becoming a god. A little earlier in the same section, in a supposed prophecy by King Nebuchadnezzar, King Nebuchadnezzar claims to be descended from Belus.

Diodorus Siculus (6.1.10) cites Euhemerus as relating that Zeus (a euhemerized Zeus) went to Babylon and was entertained by Belus. Diodorus also relates (17.112.3) how the Chaldean of Babylon requested Alexander the Great to restore the "Tomb of Belus" which had been demolished by the Persians. Strabo (16.1.5) likewise refers to the ziggurat as the "Tomb of Belus" which had been demolished by Xerxes.

See Belus (Egyptian) for statements that Belus in reference to the Babylonian Zeus Belus actually refers to the Belus of Greek mythology, son of Poseidon by Libya.

It is likely the Babylonian Belus was not clearly distinguished from vague, ancient Assyrian figures named Belus though some chronographers make the distinction (see Belus (Assyrian)).

== See also ==
- Bel (god)
- Ba‘al
- Mahabali
