= Ashur-nadin-ahhe I =

King of Assyria from 1435 BC to 1420 BC

King of Assyria
- Reign: c. 1453 – c. 1431 BC (Note: The length of Ashur-nadin-ahhe I's reign is broken off in all known copies of the Assyrian King List and it is impossible to calculate how long it lasted. The dates used here are speculative approximations by Düring (2020).)
- Predecessor: Ashur-rabi I
- Successor: Enlil-Nasir II
- Died: c. 1431 BC
- Father: Ashur-rabi I

Ashur-nadin-ahhe I (Aššur-nādin-aḫḫē I; died c. 1431 BC) was a king of Assyria in the 15th century BC. He took power after the death of his father, Ashur-rabi I. During his reign, Assyria became a sporadic vassal of Mitanni. He was overthrown by his brother Enlil-Nasir II.

A letter survives from him congratulating Egyptian Pharaoh Thutmose III on his victories in Palestine and Syria.

== Notes ==
Preceded by Ashur-rabi I	King of Assyria c. 1453 – c. 1431 BC	Succeeded by Enlil-Nasir II
