= Ashur-shaduni =

- Issi'ak Assur

King of Assur
- Reign: c. 1473 BC
- Predecessor: Nur-ili
- Successor: Ashur-rabi I
- Father: Nur-ili

Aššur-šaddûni or -šaduni, inscribed ^{m}aš-šur-KUR-ú-ni (Note: Khorsabad Kinglist tablet IM 60017 (excavation nos.: DS 828, DS 32-54), ii 43.) or [^{m}aš-šur-K]UR-u-ni (Note: SDAS Kinglist, tablet IM 60484, ii 32.) and meaning “(the god) Aššur (is) our mountain,” was the ruler of Assyria for just "one complete month" (1 UTU UD.MEŠ-te) during the 15th century BC, the 64th to appear on the Assyrian King List. He succeeded his father, Nur-ili, but was ousted in a coup by his uncle, Aššur-rabi I.

== Reign and coup ==
There remains uncertainty concerning the dating of his accession, as the two subsequent Assyrian kings have unknown reign lengths, effectively disconnecting him and his predecessors from the firmer chronology of the later Assyrian King List. Although there are no extant contemporary inscriptions for him or his immediate predecessor or successors, his name appears on two of the Assyrian King Lists (Khorsabad and SDAS) and faintly at the end of the first column of the Synchronistic Kinglist, (Note: Synchronistic Kinglist, Ass 14616c (KAV 216), i 25'.) level with where one of the successors' to Kassite Babylonian king Kaštiliašu III might be supposed to appear.

The King lists describe his overthrow: ina GIŠ.GU.ZA ú-šat-bi GIŠ.GU.ZA iṣ-bat, "(Aššur-šaddûni) from the throne, he deposed, the throne he (Aššur-rabi) seized."

== Inscriptions ==
Preceded by Nur-ili	King of Assyria; 1473 BC	Succeeded by Ashur-rabi I
