= Hale (Assyrian king) =

Hale (Akkadian: 𒄩𒇷𒂊, romanized: Ḫa-le-e) was according to the Assyrian King List (AKL) the 18th Assyrian monarch, ruling in Assyria's early period. Hale is listed within a section of the AKL as the second out of the ten “kings whose fathers are known”. This section has often been interpreted as the list of ancestors of the Amorite Shamshi-Adad I (fl. c. 1809 BC) who had conquered the city-state of Aššur. In keeping with this assumption, scholars have inferred that the original form of the AKL had been written (among other things) as an “attempt to justify that Šamši-Adad I was a legitimate ruler of the city-state Aššur and to obscure his non-Assyrian antecedents by incorporating his ancestors into a native Assyrian genealogy.” However, this interpretation has not been accepted universally; the Cambridge Ancient History rejected this interpretation and instead interpreted the section as being that of the ancestors of Sulili.

The AKL also states the following: "Hale son of Apiashal," additionally; "Samani son of Hale." Apiashal is listed within the section of the AKL as the last of "altogether seventeen kings, tent dwellers". This section shows marked similarities to the supposed ancestors of the First Babylonian Dynasty.

== See also ==
- Timeline of the Assyrian Empire
- List of Assyrian kings
- Assyrian continuity
- Assyrian people
- Assyria
