= Yakmesi =

Assyrian king

Yakmesi (Akkadian: 𒅀𒀝𒈨𒋛, romanized: Ia-ak-me-si) was according to the Assyrian King List (AKL) the 22nd Assyrian monarch, ruling in Assyria's early period. Yakmesi is listed in the AKL as the sixth of ten 'kings whose fathers are known.' Unlike the rest of the list, this section is written in reverse order—starting with 'Aminu' and ending with 'Apiashal,' described as 'altogether ten kings who are ancestors""—and has often been interpreted as the list of ancestors of the Amorite Šamši-Adad I (fl. c. 1809 BC) who had conquered the city-state of Aššur. The AKL also states that Yakmesi had been both the son and successor of Ilu-Mer. Additionally, the AKL states that Yakmesi had been both the predecessor and father of Yakmeni.

== See also ==
- Timeline of the Assyrian Empire
- Early Period of Assyria
- List of Assyrian kings
- Assyrian continuity
- Assyrian people
- Assyria
