= Sulili =

Sulili 𒋢𒇷𒇷

King of Assur
- Reign: c. 2100 BC

Sulili (Akkadian: 𒋢𒇷𒇷, romanized: Su-li-li; fl. c. 2100 BC) was according to the Assyrian King List (AKL) the 27th Assyrian monarch, ruling in Assyria's early period. He also appears within the Assyrian King List as the first out of the six kings “(whose names were written on?) bricks but whose eponyms are (not known?)". Additionally, it is stated within the Assyrian King List that he was the successor of and “son of Aminu". Aminu had himself been the son of and successor of Ila-kabkabu, and Aminu and Ila-kabkabu were among the 10 kings “who are ancestors".

The section within the Assyrian King List “kings who are ancestors/whose fathers are known” (which, in contrast to the rest of the list, was written in reverse order, beginning with Aminu and ending with Apiashal), has often been interpreted as a list of Shamshi-Adad I's ancestors. In keeping with this assumption, scholars have inferred that the original form of the Assyrian King List had been written, among other things, as an “attempt to justify that Shamshi-Adad I was a legitimate ruler of the city-state Assur and to obscure his non-Assyrian antecedents by incorporating his ancestors into a native Assyrian genealogy.” However, this interpretation has not been accepted universally; the Cambridge Ancient History rejected this interpretation and instead interpreted the section as the ancestors of Sulili. Sulili is also shown as being the predecessor of Kikkia within the Assyrian King List.

A man by the name "Silulu" is attested as an early ruler of Assur by contemporary seals. He is perhaps possible to identify with the otherwise unattested Sulili, but the inscription identifies Silulu's father as Dakiki, "herald of the city of Ashur", which does not fit with the genealogy of the Assyrian King List.

== See also ==
- Timeline of the Assyrian Empire
- Early Period of Assyria
- List of Assyrian kings
- Assyrian continuity
- Assyrian people

| Preceded by | King of Assur c. 2100 BC | Succeeded by |
