= List of Assyrian kings =

King of Assyria
- Iššiʾak Aššur šar māt Aššur
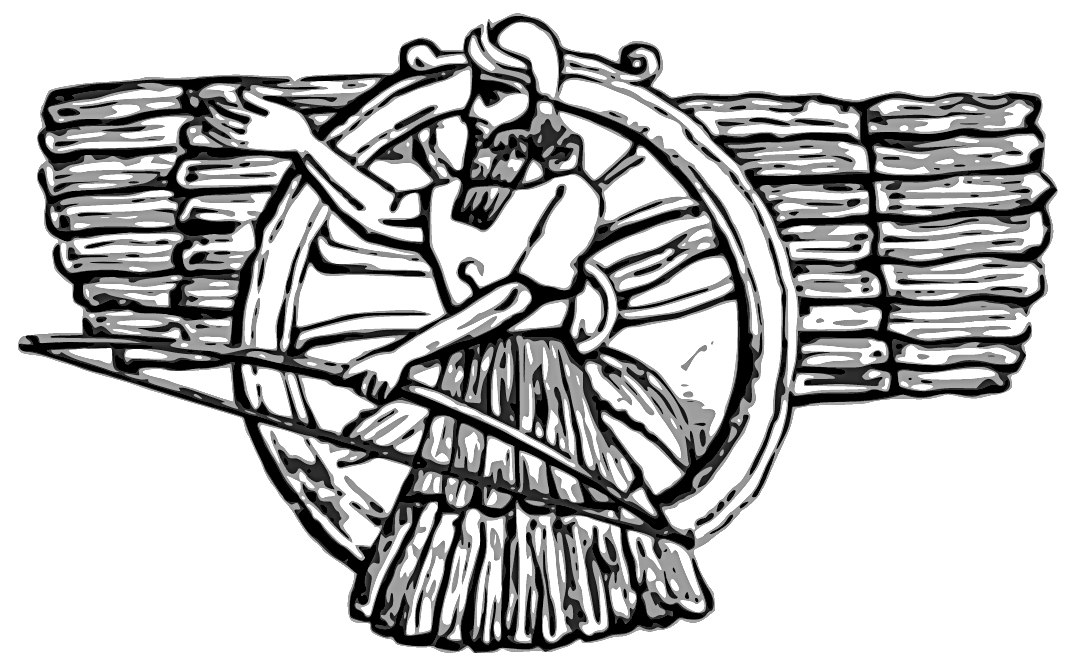
- Symbol of Ashur, the ancient Assyrian national deity

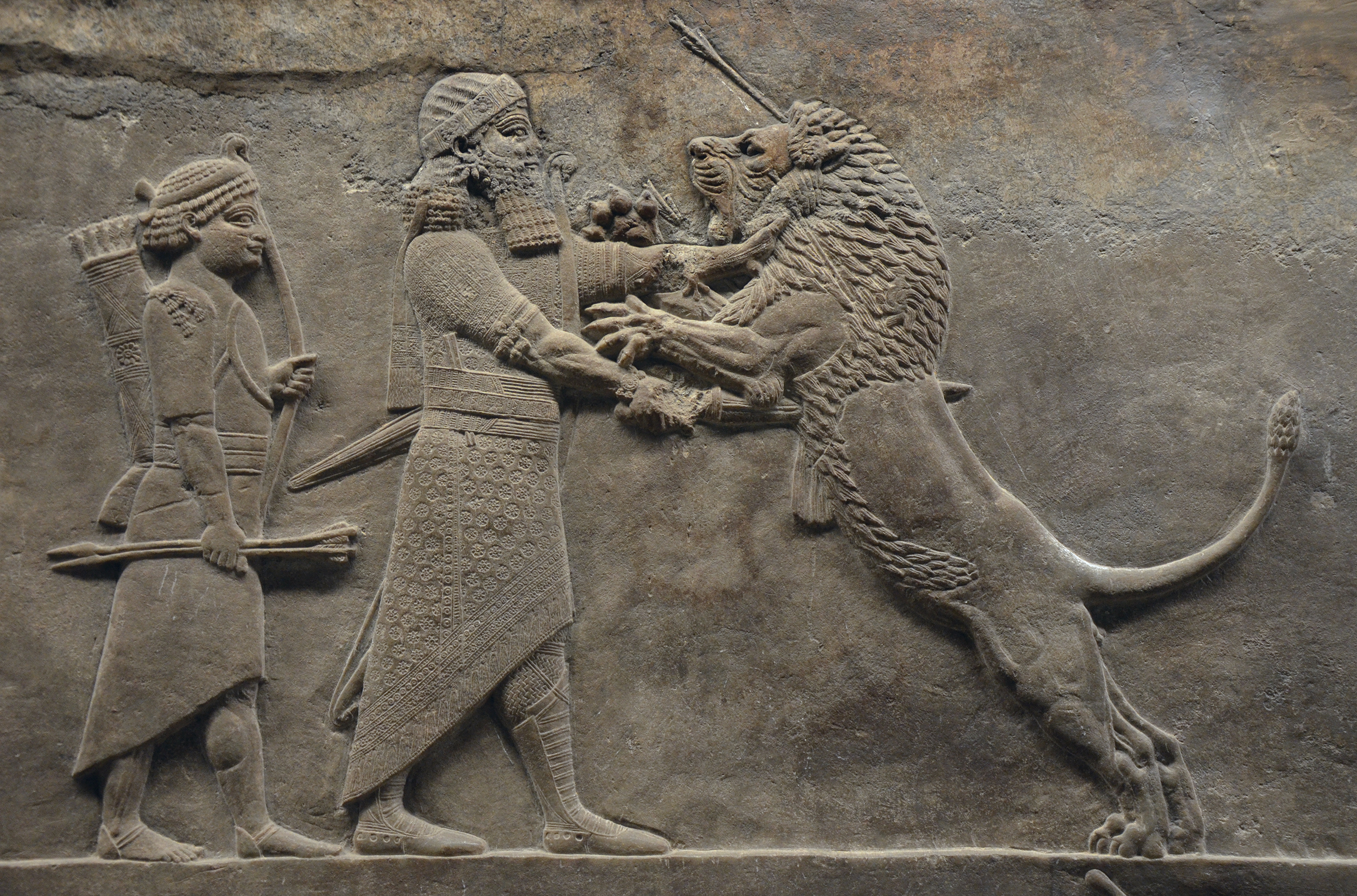
- Relief depicting Ashurbanipal (r. 669–631 BC) engaged in a lion hunt, a royal ritual meant to symbolically represent the Assyrian king's duty to bring order to the world

Details
- First monarch: Tudiya (legendary); Puzur-Ashur I (independent city-state); Ashur-uballit I (Note: Early Assyrian rulers, who ruled little more than a city-state, typically styled themselves Iššiʾak Aššur (regent or representative of Ashur). Some historians regard Ashur-uballit I as the first Assyrian king since he was the first to adopt the style šar māt Aššur (king of Assyria), which was then in consistent use from his time onwards.) (first to use 'king')
- Last monarch: Ashur-uballit II
- Formed: 21st century BC
- Abolished: 609 BC

The king of Assyria (Akkadian: Iššiʾak Aššur, later šar māt Aššur) was the ruler of the ancient Mesopotamian kingdom of Assyria, which was founded in the late 21st century BC and fell in 609 BC. For much of its early history, Assyria was little more than a city-state, centered on the city Assur, but from the 14th century BC onwards, Assyria rose under a series of warrior kings to become one of the major political powers of the Ancient Near East, and in its last few centuries it dominated the region as the largest empire the world had seen thus far. Ancient Assyrian history is typically divided into the Old, Middle and Neo-Assyrian periods, all marked by ages of ascendancy and decline.

The ancient Assyrians did not believe that their king was divine himself, but saw their ruler as the vicar of their principal deity, Ashur, and as his chief representative on Earth. In their worldview, Assyria represented a place of order while lands not governed by the Assyrian king (and by extension, the god Ashur) were seen as places of chaos and disorder. As such it was seen as the king's duty to expand the borders of Assyria and bring order and civilization to lands perceived as uncivilized. As Assyria expanded, its rulers gradually adopted grander and more boastful titles. Early kings used Iššiʾak Aššur (representative/viceroy of Ashur), considering the god Ashur to be the true king. From the time of Ashur-uballit I (14th century BC), the rulers instead used king (šar). In time, further titles, such as "king of Sumer and Akkad", "king of the Universe" and "king of the Four Corners of the World", were added, often to assert their control over all of Mesopotamia.

All modern lists of Assyrian kings generally follow the Assyrian King List, a list kept and developed by the ancient Assyrians themselves over the course of several centuries. Though some parts of the list are probably fictional, the list accords well with Hittite, Babylonian and ancient Egyptian king lists and with the archaeological record, and is generally considered reliable for the age. The line of Assyrian kings ended with the defeat of Assyria's final king Ashur-uballit II by the Neo-Babylonian Empire and the Median Empire in 609 BC, after which Assyria disappeared as an independent political unit, never to rise again. The Assyrians survived the fall of their empire and kept their own cultural and religious traditions (though were Christianized in the 1st–3rd centuries AD). At times, Assur and other Assyrian cities were afforded great deals of autonomy by its foreign rulers after the 7th century BC, particularly under the Achaemenid and Parthian empires.

== Introduction ==
=== Sources ===
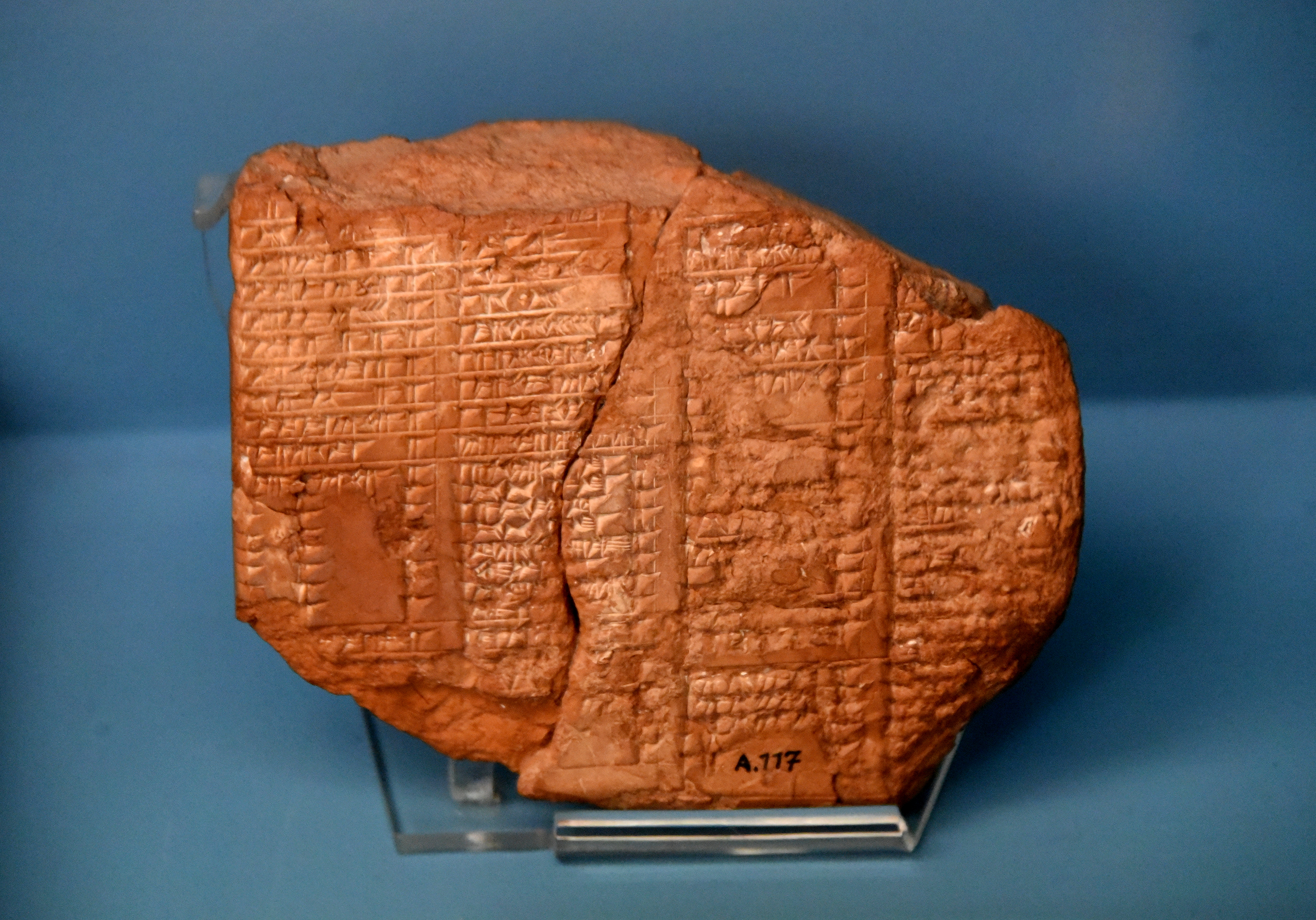
Assyrian King List of the 7th century BC on a terracotta tablet, from Assur

Incomplete king-lists have been recovered from three of the major ancient Assyrian capitals (Assur, Dur-Sharrukin and Nineveh). The three lists are largely consistent with each other, all originally copies of a single original list, and are based on the yearly appointments of limmy-officials (the eponymous officials for each year, appointed by the king to preside over the celebration of the New Year festival). Because of the consistency between the list and the method through which it was created, modern scholars usually accept the regnal years mentioned as more or less correct. There are some differences between the copies of the list, notably in that they offer somewhat diverging regnal years before the reign of king Ashur-dan I of the Middle Assyrian Empire (reign beginning in c. 1178 BC). After his time, the lists are identical in their contents.

The king-lists mostly accord well with Hittite, Babylonian and ancient Egyptian king lists and with the archaeological record, and are generally considered reliable for the age. It is however clear that parts of the list are fictional, as some known kings are not found on the list and other listed kings are not independently verified. Originally it was assumed that the list was first written in the time of Shamshi-Adad I c. 1800 BC but it now is considered to date from much later, probably from the time of Ashurnasirpal I (r. 1049–1031 BC). The oldest of the surviving king-lists, List A (8th century BC) stops at Tiglath-Pileser II (r. 967–935 BC) and the youngest, List C, stops at Shalmaneser V (r. 727–722 BC).

One problem that arises with the Assyrian King List is that the creation of the list may have been more motivated by political interest than actual chronological and historical accuracy. In times of civil strife and confusion, the list still adheres to a single royal line of descent, probably ignoring rival claimants to the throne. Additionally, there are some known inconsistencies between the list and actual inscriptions by Assyrian kings, often regarding dynastic relationships. For instance, Ashur-nirari II is stated by the list to be the son of his predecessor Enlil-Nasir II, but from inscriptions it is known that he was actually the son of Ashur-rabi I and brother of Enlil-Nasir.

=== Titles ===
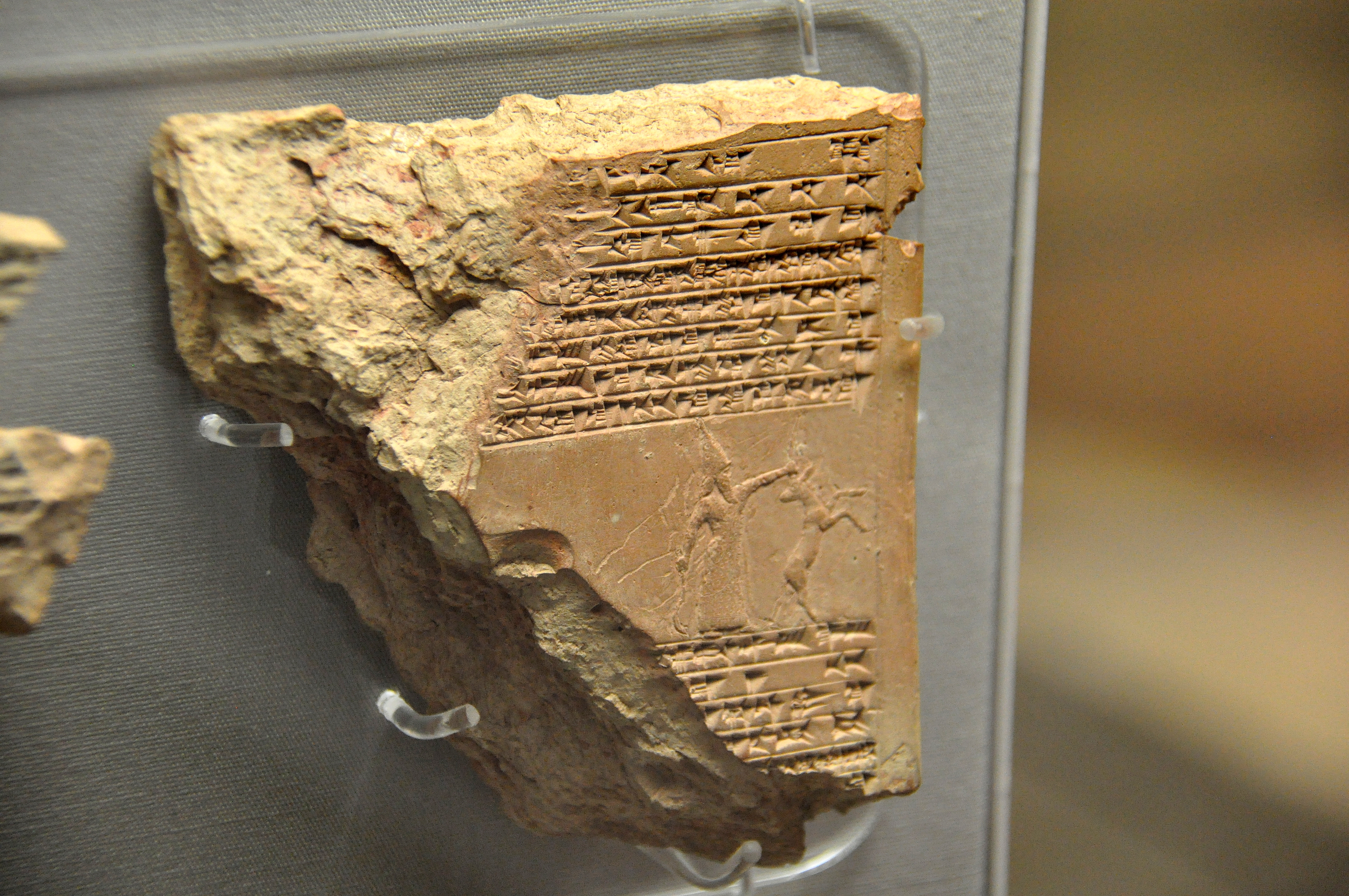
Text and seal of Shamash-shum-ukin, a Neo-Assyrian king of Babylon, featuring a depiction of the king fighting an oryx antelope

Assyrian royal titles typically followed trends that had begun under the Akkadian Empire (c. 2334–2154 BC), the Mesopotamian civilization that preceded the later kingdoms of Assyria and Babylon. When the Mesopotamian central government under the Third Dynasty of Ur (c. 2112–2004 BC) collapsed and polities that had once been vassals to Ur became independent, many of the new sovereign rulers refrained from taking the title of king (šar), instead applying that title to their principal deities (in the case of Assyria, Ashur). For this reason, most of the Assyrian kings of the Old Assyrian period (c. 2025–1364 BC) used the title Iššiʾak Aššur, translating to "governor of Assyria".

In contrast to the titles employed by the Babylonian kings in the south, which typically focused on the protective role and the piety of the king, Assyrian royal inscriptions tend to glorify the strength and power of the king. Assyrian titularies usually also often emphasize the royal genaeology of the king, something Babylonian titularies do not, and also drive home the king's moral and physical qualities while downplaying his role in the judicial system. Assyrian epithets about royal lineage vary in how far they stretch back, most often simply discussing lineage in terms of "son of ..." or "brother of ...". Some cases display lineage stretching back much further, Shamash-shum-ukin (r. 667–648 BC) describes himself as a "descendant of Sargon II", his great-grandfather. More extremely, Esarhaddon (r. 681–669 BC) calls himself a "descendant of the eternal seed of Bel-bani", a king who lived more than a thousand years before him.

Assyrian royal titularies were often changed depending on where the titles were to be displayed, the titles of the same Assyrian king would have been different in their home country of Assyria and in conquered regions. Those Neo-Assyrian kings who controlled the city of Babylon used a "hybrid" titulary of sorts in the south, combining aspects of the Assyrian and Babylonian tradition, similar to how the traditional Babylonian deities were promoted in the south alongside the Assyrian main deity of Ashur. The assumption of many traditional southern titles, including the ancient "king of Sumer and Akkad" and the boastful "king of the Universe" and "king of the Four Corners of the World", by the Assyrian kings served to legitimize their rule and assert their control over Babylon and lower Mesopotamia. Epithets like "chosen by the god Marduk and the goddess Sarpanit" and "favourite of the god Ashur and the goddess Mullissu", both assumed by Esarhaddon, illustrate that he was both Assyrian (Ashur and Mullissu, the main pair of Assyrian deities) and a legitimate ruler over Babylon (Marduk and Sarpanit, the main pair of Babylonian deities).

To exemplify an Assyrian royal title from the time Assyria ruled all of Mesopotamia, the titulature preserved in one of Esarhaddon's inscriptions reads as follows:

The great king, the mighty king, king of the Universe, king of Assyria, viceroy of Babylon, king of Sumer and Akkad, son of Sennacherib, the great king, the mighty king, king of Assyria, grandson of Sargon, the great king, the mighty king, king of Assyria; who under the protection of Assur, Sin, Shamash, Nabu, Marduk, Ishtar of Nineveh, Ishtar of Arbela, the great gods, his lords, made his way from the rising to the setting sun, having no rival.

=== Role of the Assyrian king ===
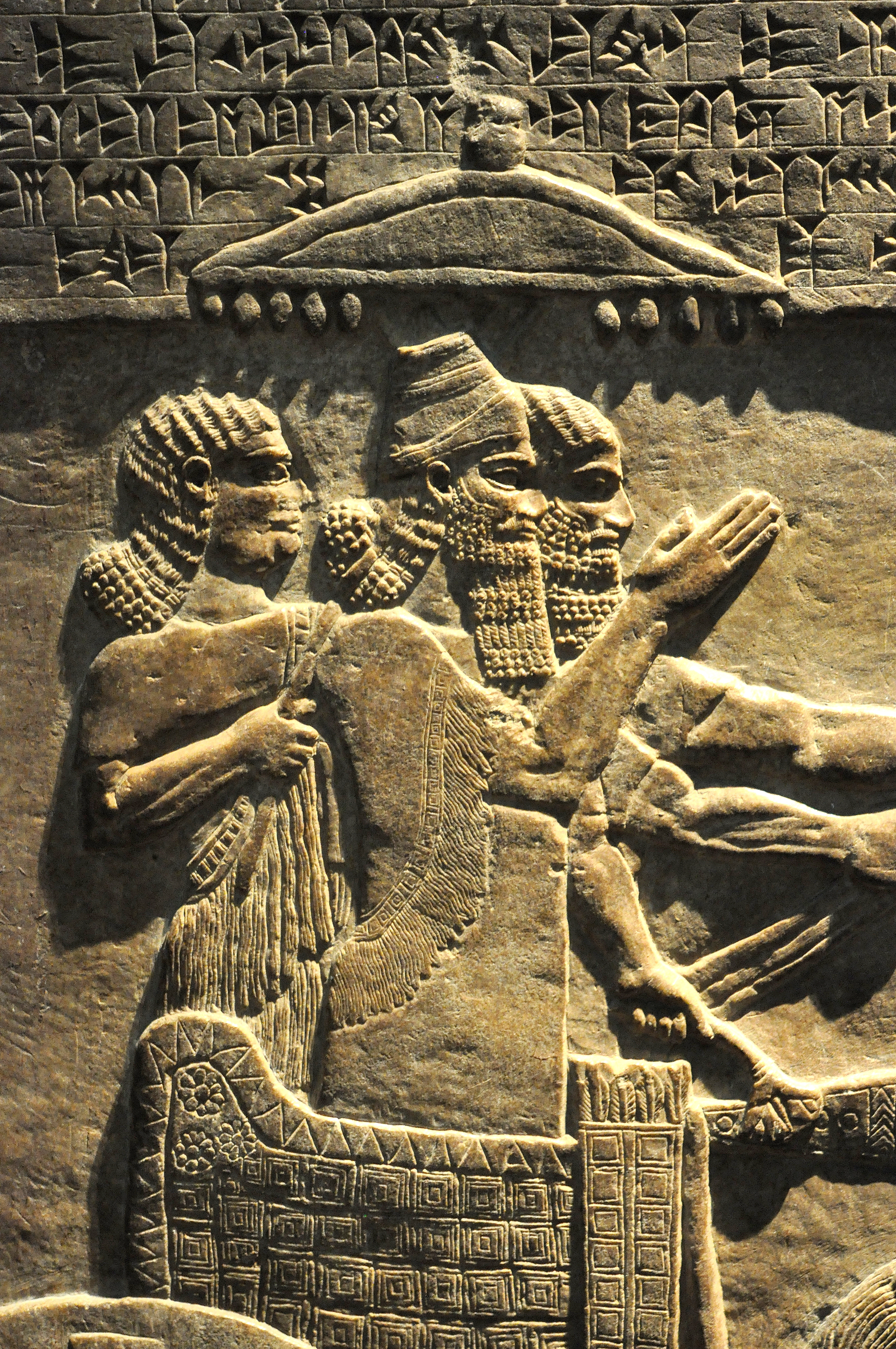
Relief of Tiglath-Pileser III (r. 745–727), depicting the king in a chariot

Ancient Assyria was an absolute monarchy, with the king believed to be appointed directly through divine right by the chief deity, Ashur. The Assyrians believed that the king was the link between the gods and the earthly realm. As such, it was the king's primary duty to discover the will of the gods and enact this, often through the construction of temples or waging war. To aid the king with this duty, there was a number of priests at the royal court trained in reading and interpreting signs from the gods.

The heartland of the Assyrian realm, Assyria itself, was thought to represent a serene and perfect place of order whilst the lands governed by foreign powers were perceived as infested with disorder and chaos. The peoples of these "outer" lands were seen as uncivilized, strange and as speaking strange languages. Because the king was the earthly link to the gods, it was his duty to spread order throughout the world through the military conquest of these strange and chaotic countries. As such, imperial expansion was not just expansion for expansion's sake but was also seen as a process of bringing divine order and destroying chaos to create civilization.

There exists several ancient inscriptions in which the god Ashur explicitly orders kings to extend the borders of Assyria. A text from the reign of Tukulti-Ninurta I (r. c. 1243–1207 BC) states that the king received a royal scepter and was commanded to "broaden the land of Ashur". A similar inscription from the reign of Ashurbanipal (r. 668–631 BC) commands the king to "extend the land at his feet".

The king was also tasked with protecting his own people, often being referred to as a "shepherd". This protection included defending against external enemies and defending citizens from dangerous wild animals. To the Assyrians, the most dangerous animal of all was the lion, used (similarly to foreign powers) as an example of chaos and disorder due to their aggressive nature. To prove themselves worthy of rule and illustrate that they were competent protectors, Assyrian kings engaged in ritual lion hunts. Lion-hunting was reserved for Assyrian royalty and was a public event, staged at parks in or near the Assyrian cities. In some cases, the hunt even took place with captive lions in an arena.

=== Legitimacy ===
As opposed to some other ancient monarchies, such as ancient Egypt, the Assyrian king was not believed to be divine himself, but was seen as divinely chosen and uniquely qualified for the royal duties. Most kings stressed their legitimacy through their familial connections to previous kings; a king was legitimate through his relation to the previous line of great kings who had been chosen by Ashur. Usurpers who were unrelated to previous kings usually either simply lied about being the son of some previous monarch or claimed that they had been divinely appointed directly by Ashur.

Two prominent examples of such usurpers are the kings Tiglath-Pileser III (r. 745–727 BC) and Sargon II (r. 722–705 BC). The inscriptions of these kings completely lack any familial references to previous kings, instead stressing that Ashur himself had appointed them directly with phrases such as "Ashur called my name", "Ashur placed me on the throne" and "Ashur placed his merciless weapon in my hand".

== Assyrian kings ==
=== Early Assyrian rulers ===
==== Early names in king lists ====
The Assyrian King List includes a long sequence of rulers before Assyria's first confidently attested kings (of the Puzur-Ashur dynasty), though it is suspected by modern scholars that at least portions of this line of rulers are invented since none of the names are attested in contemporary records and many of the names of the earliest rulers rhyme (suggesting an invented pattern). This is further corroborated by the absence of certain figures in the list known to have ruled in Assur before the Puzur-Ashur dynasty (the governors under Assur's foreign rulers). The Synchronistic King List diverges from the Assyrian King List and considers Erishum I (r. c. 1974–1935 BC), the fourth king of the Puzur-Ashur dynasty, to be the first king of Assyria. Though it includes earlier names, the Assyrian King List does not list the length of the rule of any king before Erishum I.

Given that the earliest rulers are described as "kings who lived in tents", they, if real, may not have ruled Assur at all but rather have been nomadic tribal chieftains somewhere in its vicinity. As in the Sumerian King List, several names may also have belonged to rulers who were contemporaries/rivals, rather than successors and predecessors of one another. Some researchers have dismissed these names as a mixture of Amorite tribal-geographical names with no relation to Assyria at all. It is possible that the 'kings who were ancestors', who are not attested in any other sources as present at Assur, refer to the ancestors of Shamshi-Adad I (r. c. 1808–1776 BC), given that other sources claim that his father was named Ilu-kabkabu, and they might thus not have been kings of Assyria, but rather rulers of Terqa, Shamshi-Adad's supposed ancestral home. Including these figures may have served to justify Shamshi-Adad's rise to the throne, either through obscuring his non-Assyrian origins or through inserting his ancestors into the sequence of Assyrian kings.

The early portion of the Assyrian King List contains these otherwise historically unverified names:

Kings who lived in tents

1. Tudiya
2. Adamu
3. Yangi
4. Suhlamu
5. Harharu
6. Mandaru
7. Imsu
8. Harsu
9. Didanu
10. Hanu
11. Zuabu
12. Nuabu
13. Abazu
14. Belu
15. Azarah
16. Ushpia
17. Apiashal, son of Ushpia

Kings who were ancestors

The kings are listed in reverse order in the AKL, starting from Aminu and ending with Apiashal(who is also included in the list of kings who lived in tents).

18. Hale, son of Apiashal
19. Samani, son of Hale
20. Hayani, son of Samani
21. Ilu-Mer, son of Hayani
22. Yakmesi, son of Ilu-Mer
23. Yakmeni, son of Yakmesi
24. Yazkur-el, son of Yakmeni
25. Ila-kabkabu, son of Yazkur-el
26. Aminu, son of Ila-kabkabu

Kings named on bricks

There are six of them, including three kings that are part of the Old Assyrian empire from Puzur-Ashur I to Ilu-shuma.

27. Sulili, son of Aminu
28. Kikkia
29. Akiya

==== Attested early rulers ====
A handful of early local rulers of Assur under foreign suzerainty are known from contemporary sources from before the time of Puzur-Ashur I. The precise dates of the highly incomplete sequence of figures listed below are unknown and none of them appear among the rulers before Puzur-Ashur I in the king list. Perhaps their absence could be explained by these figures not being considered to be proper kings. Several are however attested with the title "supreme judge" (waklum) a title probably equivalent to Iššiʾak Aššur and sometimes used by later kings.

Name	Period	Status and notes	Ref
Ititi	Akkadian	Vassal of Rimush of Akkad (r. c. 2279–2270 BC) (?), described as the son of Ininlaba (possibly another ruler?)	
Azuzu	Akkadian	Vassal of Manishtushu of Akkad (r. c. 2270–2255 BC). Name found inscribed on the point of a spear.	
Ilabaandul	Akkadian	Attested as governor of Assur in an Akkadian-period list from Ur of local governors.	
Zariqum	Ur III	Vassal of Amar-Sin of Ur (r. c. 2046–2037 BC). Name found inscribed on a limestone slab.	
Silulu	Uncertain	Name inscribed on a seal. Perhaps identifiable with the Assyrian King List's Sulili, but described as the son of Dakiki (not Aminu).	

=== Puzur-Ashur dynasty (2025–1809 BC) ===
The dynasty founded by Puzur-Ashur is conventionally known by modern historians as the 'Puzur-Ashur dynasty' after its founder. Puzur-Ashur I is generally seen as the founder of Assyria as an independent city-state c. 2025 BC. Some historians on the other hand speculate that Puzur-Ashur was not a new dynastic founder, but that his dynasty actually began earlier, perhaps by Sulili. The dynasty has thus also been termed the 'Sulili–Puzur-Ashur dynasty'. The dynasty has also been referred to simply as the 'Old Assyrian dynasty'. These kings, beginning with Puzur-Ashur I, took power in the aftermath of the collapse of the Neo-Sumerian Empire, which had ruled over Assyria.

(Portrait)	Name	Reign	Succession and notes	Ref
Old Assyrian period, 2025–1364 BC
Puzur-Ashur I Puzur-Aššur		Uncertain (Note: The Assyrian King List gives no regnal dates for the first three kings of the Puzur-Ashur dynasty and no eponyms are known.)	Unclear succession, possibly first independent ruler of Assur	
Shalim-ahum; Šallim-aḫḫe		Uncertain	Son of Puzur-Ashur I	
Ilu-shuma; Ilu-šūma		Uncertain	Son of Shalim-ahum	
	Erishum I Erišum	c. 1974 – 1935 BC (40 years)	Son of Ilu-shuma	
Ikunum; Ikūnum		c. 1934 – 1921 BC (14 years)	Son of Erishum I	
	Sargon I Šarru-kīn	c. 1920 – 1881 BC (40 years)	Son of Ikunum	
Puzur-Ashur II; Puzur-Aššur		c. 1880 – 1873 BC (8 years)	Son of Sargon I	
	Naram-Sin; Narām-Sîn	c. 1872 – 1829/1819 BC (Note: The reign lengths of Naram-Sin and Erishum II are approximate; preserved eponyms suggest that they together ruled for 64 years, but the distribution of years is not known.) (54 or 44 years)	Son of Puzur-Ashur II	
Erishum II; Erišum		c. 1828/1818 – 1809 BC (20 or 10 years)	Son of Naram-Sin	

=== Shamshi-Adad dynasty (1808–1736 BC) ===
The dynasty founded by Shamshi-Adad I, who deposed the Puzur-Ashur dynasty, is conventionally known as the 'Shamshi-Adad dynasty', after its founder. During the rule of Shamshi-Adad I and his successors, of Amorite descent and originally from the south, a more absolute form of kingship, inspired by that of Babylon, was introduced in Assyria. During the preceding Puzur-Ashur dynasty, royal power in Assur had been more limited than in other cities, with inscriptions describing how the king worked in tandem with the city assembly to establish law and order. The earliest use of the term šarrum (king) in Assyrian inscriptions comes from Shamshi-Adad I's reign. Shamshi-Adad I was also the first Assyrian king to assume the title 'king of the Universe', though these styles fell into a long period of disuse again after his death. The short-lived realm founded by Shamshi-Adad I is sometimes referred to as the Kingdom of Upper Mesopotamia.

(Portrait)	Name	Reign	Succession and notes	Ref
	Shamshi-Adad I Šamši-Adad	c. 1808 – 1776 BC (Note: Shamshi-Adad I's death can be precisely dated relative to the sequence of Babylonian kings, as he is known to have died in the 17th year of the Babylonian king Hammurabi. In the middle chronology, considered the most accurate chronology of Mesopotamian history by the majority of researchers on the basis of known evidence and synchronisms, Hammurabi is dated to 1792–1750 BC. Hammurabi's 17th regnal year thus corresponds (in this chronology) to 1776 BC.) (33 years)	Amorite usurper, unrelated to previous kings	
Ishme-Dagan I Išme-Dagān		c. 1775 – 1765 BC (Note: The Assyrian King List accords Ishme-Dagan I a reign of 40 or 50 years (depending on the copy). He ruled from Ekallatum, near Assur, and it is possible that his reign overlapped with that of his father as letters from Mari show that he only ruled for about 11 years after his father's death.) (11 years)	Son of Shamshi-Adad I	
Mut-Ashkur (Note: It is not certain that Mut-Ashkur or Rimush actually ruled Assyria. Their names do not appear in the more complete copies of the Assyrian King List, which instead skip directly from Ishme-Dagan I to Ashur-dugul, and are only attested from a fragmentary copy of the list, KAV 14. It is possible that they controlled Ekallatum alone. Reade (2001) believes that Shamshi-Adad's descendants continued to rule at Assur as well until Puzur-Sin deposed them.); Mut-Aškur		Uncertain (Note: No sources record the length of Mut-Ashkur's reign or the reigns of his immediate successors. Reade (2001) speculatively assigned 29 years to the period between Ishme-Dagan I and Puzur-Sin (i.e. the reigns of Mut-Ashkur, Rimush and Asinum).)	Son of Ishme-Dagan I	
Rimush; Rimuš		Uncertain	Uncertain relation	
Asinum (Note: The inscription by the king Puzur-Sin, who deposed and succeeded Shamshi-Adad I's family, states that he drove Shamshi-Adad's "grandson" (or "descendant") a-sí-nim from Assur. A-sí-nim is usually interpreted as a proper name (i.e. the last king of Shamshi-Adad's dynasty was called Asinum) but it is not impossible that it was a title or nickname since the term assinnu was used for priest-like people who were neither male nor female. If this would be the case, the person Puzur-Sin drove from Assur could have been the earlier Rimush, and not a separate king called Asinum.); Asīnum		Uncertain	Grandson (?) of Shamshi-Adad I	

=== Non-dynastic usurpers (1735–1701 BC) ===
Name	Reign	Succession and notes	Ref
Puzur-Sin (Note: Contemporary inscriptions at Assur attest that the king Puzur-Sin deposed the Shamshi-Adad dynasty, on account of their line having been started by a foreign usurper. Puzur-Sin, and any potential successors of his line, were omitted in the Assyrian King List and no reference to him survives from the inscriptions of any later Assyrian ruler. It is possible that he was considered to be an usurper who deserved to be forgotten.); Puzur-Sîn	Uncertain	Usurper, unrelated to previous kings	
Ashur-dugul; Aššur-dugul	Uncertain (6 years)	Usurper, unrelated to previous kings	
Ashur-apla-idi; Aššur-apla-idi	Uncertain (Note: The Assyrian King List assigns Ashur-apla-idi and the five "usurpers" after him to the reign of Ashur-dugul, as his rivals. Their rule together cannot have covered more than one year and some Assyriologists believe it to be appropriate to omit them entirely from the sequence of kings as the list makes no claim that any of them ruled in their own right, and not just as rivals of Ashur-dugul. There is also doubt that these figures claimed to be kings and fought against Ashur-dugul in the first place since the sequence of names is suspiciously similar to the eponyms of Ashur-dugul's reign.)	Usurper, unrelated to previous kings	
Nasir-Sin; Nāṣir-Sîn	Uncertain	Usurper, unrelated to previous kings	
Sin-namir; Sîn-nāmir	Uncertain	Usurper, unrelated to previous kings	
Ipqi-Ishtar; Ipqi-Ištar	Uncertain	Usurper, unrelated to previous kings	
Adad-salulu; Adad-ṣalulu	Uncertain	Usurper, unrelated to previous kings	
Adasi; Adasi	Uncertain	Usurper, unrelated to previous kings	

=== Adaside dynasty (1700–722 BC) ===
The dynasty founded by Bel-bani, which ruled Assyria throughout most of its history, is conventionally known as the Adaside or Adasi dynasty, after Bel-bani's father. In Babylonia, this dynasty of kings was called the "Baltil dynasty", Baltil being the oldest portion of the city of Assur.

(Portrait)	Name	Reign	Succession and notes		Ref
Bel-bani; Bēlu-bāni		c. 1700 – 1691 BC (10 years)	Son of Adasi		
Libaya; Libaia		c. 1690 – 1674 BC (17 years)	Son of Bel-bani		
Sharma-Adad I Šarma-Adad		c. 1673 – 1662 BC (12 years)	Son of Libaya		
Iptar-Sin; Ibtar-Sîn		c. 1661 – 1650 BC (12 years)	Son of Sharma-Adad I		
Bazaya; Bāzā[y]a		c. 1649 – 1622 BC (28 years)	Son of Bel-bani		
Lullaya; Lulā[y]a		c. 1621 – 1616 BC (6 years)	Unrelated to other kings, possibly a usurper		
Shu-Ninua (Note: Alternatively translated as Kidin-Ninua.); Šu-Ninua		c. 1615 – 1602 BC (14 years)	Son of Bazaya		
Sharma-Adad II; Šarma-Adad		c. 1601 – 1599 BC (3 years)	Son of Shu-Ninua		
Erishum III; Erišum		c. 1598 – 1586 BC (13 years)	Son of Shu-Ninua		
Shamshi-Adad II; Šamši-Adad		c. 1585 – 1580 BC (6 years)	Son of Erishum III		
Ishme-Dagan II; Išme-Dagān		c. 1579 – 1564 BC (16 years)	Son of Shamshi-Adad II		
Shamshi-Adad III; Šamši-Adad		c. 1563 – 1548 BC (16 years)	Son of Shamshi-Adad II		
Ashur-nirari I Aššur-nārāri		c. 1547 – 1522 BC (26 years)	Son of Ishme-Dagan II		
Puzur-Ashur III; Puzur-Aššur		c. 1521 – 1498 BC (Note: In the Seventh Day Adventist copy of the Assyrian King List, Puzur-Ashur III is accorded a reign of 24 years, whereas the Nassouhi copy gives 14 years. In later Assyrian historiography, the dates used varied. Scribes working in the reigns of Shalmaneser I (r. 1273–1244 BC) and Tiglath-Pileser I (r. 1114–1076 BC) used 14 years, whereas scribes working in the reign of Esarhaddon used 24 years (r. 681–669 BC). Among modern scholars, the 24-year figure has more support than the 14-year figure.) (24 years)	Son of Ashur-nirari I		
Enlil-nasir I Enlīl-nāsir		c. 1497 – 1485 BC (13 years)	Son of Puzur-Ashur III		
Nur-ili; Nur-ili		c. 1484 – 1473 BC (12 years)	Son of Enlil-nasir I		
Ashur-shaduni; Aššur-šaddûni		c. 1473 BC (1 month)	Son of Nur-ili		
Ashur-rabi I Aššur-rabi		c. 1472 – 1453 BC (Note: The length of the reigns of Ashur-rabi I and Ashur-nadin-ahhe I, who ruled in a period of instability, are broken off in all known copies of the Assyrian King List and there is no sure way of calculating them accurately. This list follows the proposed dates of Düring (2020). Other proposed dates include neither king having a full regnal year of their own or a combined reign of 14+15 years.) (20 years)	Son of Enlil-nasir I, usurped the throne from his nephew		
Ashur-nadin-ahhe I Aššur-nādin-ahhē		c. 1452 – 1431 BC (22 years)	Son of Ashur-rabi I		
Enlil-nasir II; Enlīl-nāsir		c. 1430 – 1425 BC (6 years)	Son of Ashur-rabi I, usurped the throne from his brother		
Ashur-nirari II; Aššur-nārāri		c. 1424 – 1418 BC (7 years)	Son of Ashur-rabi I (Note: The Khorsabad copy of the Assyrian King List designates Ashur-nirari II as the son of his predecessor Enlil-nasir II, but contemporary inscriptions prove that he was the son of Ashur-rabi I.)		
Ashur-bel-nisheshu; Aššūr-bēl-nīšēšu		c. 1417 – 1409 BC (9 years)	Son of Ashur-nirari II		
Ashur-rim-nisheshu; Aššūr-rem-nīšēšu		c. 1408 – 1401 BC (8 years)	Son of Ashur-nirari II		
Ashur-nadin-ahhe II; Aššur-nādin-ahhē		c. 1400 – 1391 BC (10 years)	Son of Ashur-rim-nisheshu		
Eriba-Adad I Erība-Adad		c. 1390 – 1364 BC (27 years)	Son of Ashur-bel-nisheshu		
Middle Assyrian Empire, 1363–912 BC
Ashur-uballit I Aššur-uballiṭ		c. 1363 – 1328 BC (36 years)	Son of Eriba-Adad I, first šar māt Aššur		
Enlil-nirari; Enlīl-nārāri		c. 1327 – 1318 BC (10 years)	Son of Ashur-uballit I		
Arik-den-ili; Arīk-den-ili		c. 1317 – 1306 BC (12 years)	Son of Enlil-nirari		
Adad-nirari I Adad-nārārī		c. 1305 – 1274 BC (32 years)	Son of Arik-den-ili (Note: The Khorsabad and Seventh Day Adventist copies of the Assyrian King List designated Adad-nirari I as the son of Enlil-nirari (and thus Arik-den-ili's brother). The Nassouhi copy designates him as Arik-den-ili's son, which must be correct given that Adad-nirari I's own inscriptions also state that he was Arik-den-ili's son.)		
Shalmaneser I Salmānu-ašarēd		c. 1273 – 1244 BC (30 years)	Son of Adad-nirari I		
	Tukulti-Ninurta I Tukultī-Ninurta	c. 1243 – 1207 BC (37 years)	Son of Shalmaneser I		
Ashur-nadin-apli; Aššūr-nādin-apli		c. 1206 – 1203 BC (Note: Depending on the copy, the Assyrian King List assigns either 3 (Khorsabad and Seventh Day Adventist copies) or 4 (Nassouhi copy) years to Ashur-nadin-apli. Analysis of timespans from the time of the later king Esarhaddon favors 4 rather than 3 years.) (4 years)	Son of Tukulti-Ninurta I, usurped the throne from his father		
Ashur-nirari III; Aššur-nārāri		c. 1202 – 1197 BC (6 years)	Son of Ashur-nadin-apli		
Enlil-kudurri-usur; Enlīl-kudurri-uṣur		c. 1196 – 1192 BC (5 years)	Son of Tukulti-Ninurta I		
Ninurta-apal-Ekur; Ninurta-apal-Ekur		c. 1191 – 1179 BC (Note: Depending on the copy, the Assyrian King List assigns either 13 or 3 years to Ninurta-apal-Ekur, and either 36 or 46 years to his successor Ashur-dan I, which means that different reconstructions of the sequence of Assyrian kings can contradict each other by as much as 10–20 years. In both the Khorsabad (and SDAS) copy (3+46) and the Nassouhi copy (13+36), the total length of their reigns together adds up to 49 years. Inscriptions by Assyrian kings who ruled generations later, such as Tiglath-Pileser I (r. 1114–1076 BC), and centuries later, Esarhaddon (r. 681–669 BC), suggest that the combined 49-year figure made became the established version within ancient Assyrian historiography (though it may in this way have been based on errors in earlier king lists). There is little evidence as to which figure is correct in regards to Ashur-dan I, but it is unlikely that Ninurta-apal-Ekur would have ruled for only 3 years given that 11 eponyms could possibly be referred to his reign and because the Synchronistic King List makes him out to be a contemporary of three Babylonian kings with relatively long reigns. A larger amount of inscriptions are also known from Ninurta-apal-Ekur's reign than from Ashur-dan's reign, which does not suggest that it was so brief. Most modern historians use the longest figures for both kings, giving Ninurta-apal-Ekur 13 years and Ashur-dan I 46 years. Some argue with keeping to the 49 year-total, through assigning the shorter figure to either Ninurta-apal-Ekur or Ashur-dan I.) (13 years)	Great-great-great-grandson of Adad-nirari I, usurped the throne from his distant cousin		
Ashur-dan I Aššur-dān		c. 1178 – 1133 BC (46 years)	Son of Ninurta-apal-Ekur		
Ninurta-tukulti-Ashur; Ninurta-tukultī-Aššur		c. 1132 BC (Note: Ninurta-tukulti-Ashur and Mutakkil-Nusku are stated by the Assyrian King List to have ruled "briefly", with no reference to how long that is. Though it is thus typically assumed that neither ruled a full regnal year, this is impossible to verify and all dates above are thus somewhat uncertain. The dates prior are known to be reasonably accurate however as there exists preserved letters from Ashur-uballit I (dated here to 1363–1328 BC) to the Egyptian pharaoh Akhenaten (r. 1351–1334 BC).) (less than a year)	Son of Ashur-dan I		
Mutakkil-Nusku; Mutakkil-Nusku		c. 1132 BC (less than a year)	Son of Ashur-dan I, usurped the throne from his brother		
Ashur-resh-ishi I Aššur-rēša-iši		1132 – 1115 BC (18 years)	Son of Mutakkil-nusku		
	Tiglath-Pileser I Tukultī-apil-Ešarra	1114 – 1076 BC (39 years)	Son of Ashur-resh-ishi I		
Asharid-apal-Ekur; Ašarēd-apil-Ekur		1075 – 1074 BC (2 years)	Son of Tiglath-Pileser I		
Ashur-bel-kala; Aššūr-bēl-kala		1073 – 1056 BC (18 years)	Son of Tiglath-Pileser I; a century-long period of decline followed Ashur-bel-kala's death		
Eriba-Adad II; Erība-Adad		1055 – 1054 BC (2 years)	Son of Ashur-bel-kala		
Shamshi-Adad IV; Šamši-Adad		1053 – 1050 BC (4 years)	Son of Tiglath-Pileser I, usurped the throne from his nephew		
Ashurnasirpal I Aššur-nāṣir-apli		1049 – 1031 BC (19 years)	Son of Shamshi-Adad IV		
Shalmaneser II; Salmānu-ašarēd		1030 – 1019 BC (12 years)	Son of Ashurnasirpal I		
Ashur-nirari IV; Aššur-nārāri		1018 – 1013 BC (6 years)	Son of Shalmaneser II		
Ashur-rabi II; Aššur-rabi		1012 – 972 BC (41 years)	Son of Ashurnasirpal I		
Ashur-resh-ishi II; Aššur-rēša-iši		971 – 967 BC (5 years)	Son of Ashur-rabi II		
Tiglath-Pileser II; Tukultī-apil-Ešarra		966 – 935 BC (32 years)	Son of Ashur-resh-ishi II		
Ashur-dan II; Aššur-dān		934 – 912 BC (23 years)	Son of Tiglath-Pileser II, began to reconquer the territory lost under his predecessors		
Neo-Assyrian Empire, 911–609 BC
Portrait	Name	Reign	Succession	Life details and notes	Ref
Adad-nirari II; Adad-nārārī		911 – 891 BC (21 years)	Son of Ashur-dan II		
Tukulti-Ninurta II; Tukultī-Ninurta		890 – 884 BC (7 years)	Son of Adad-nirari II		
	Ashurnasirpal II; Aššur-nāṣir-apli	884 – 859 BC (25 years)	Son of Tukulti-Ninurta II	Changed the Assyrian capital to Nimrud. Campaigned to the Mediterranean. First Assyrian king to make extensive use of reliefs. Died a natural death.	
	Shalmaneser III; Salmānu-ašarēd	859 – 824 BC (35 years)	Son of Ashurnasirpal II	Fully restored Assyria's ancient borders, though there was again decline after his death. Died a natural death.	
	Shamshi-Adad V Šamši-Adad	824 – 811 BC (13 years)	Son of Shalmaneser III, defeated his brother Ashur-danin-pal in a civil war	Conquered Babylon, though it became independent again in the reign of his son. Died relatively young in unclear circumstances.	
	Adad-nirari III; Adad-nārārī	811 – 783 BC (28 years)	Son of Shamshi-Adad V. Probably young at the time of his father's death, his mother Shammuramat may have served as co-regent in his early reign.	Adad-nirari III's late reign began an obscure period from which few sources survive and Assyrian officials wielded great power. Presumably died of natural causes.	
Shalmaneser IV; Salmānu-ašarēd		783 – 773 BC (10 years)	Son of Adad-nirari III	Fate unclear due to the lack of surviving sources	
Ashur-dan III; Aššur-dān		773 – 755 BC (18 years)	Son of Adad-nirari III	Fate unclear due to the lack of surviving sources	
Ashur-nirari V Aššur-nārāri		755 – 745 BC (Note: According to the Assyrian King List, Ashur-nirari V ruled for 10 years. As the Assyrians counted reign lengths from the first full year as king (in this case 754 BC), 10 years are only achieved if Ashur-nirari V actually ruled until 744 BC. Perhaps an error, alternatively it is possible that there was a co-regency between Ashur-nirari V and Tiglath-Pileser III.) (10 years)	Son of Adad-nirari III	Fate unclear due to the lack of surviving sources, possibly deposed and killed by Tiglath-Pileser III	
	Tiglath-Pileser III; Tukultī-apil-Ešarra	745 – 727 BC (18 years)	Son of either Adad-nirari III or Ashur-nirari V. (Note: Tiglath-Pileser III claimed in his own inscriptions to be a son of Adad-nirari III, but the Assyrian King List designates him as a son of Ashur-nirari V, his immediate predecessor. His parentage is disputed among modern historians due to the large timegap (38 years) between his accession and Adad-nirari III's death.) Succeeded Ashur-nirari V in uncertain circumstances, either legitimately or through a coup or civil war.	Revitalized the Assyrian Empire and made it the supreme imperial and political power in the Near East. Conquered Babylon. Died a natural death.	
	Shalmaneser V Salmānu-ašarēd	727 – 722 BC (5 years)	Son of Tiglath-Pileser III	Deposed and killed by Sargon II in a palace coup	

=== Sargonid dynasty (722–609 BC) ===
Portrait	Name	Reign	Succession	Life details and notes	Ref
	Sargon II; Šarru-kīn	722 – 705 BC (17 years)	Claimed to be a son of Tiglath-Pileser III, actual connections to previous royalty disputed. Seized the throne from Shalmaneser V in a palace coup.	Changed the Assyrian capital to Dur-Sharrukin. Killed in battle in Anatolia, fighting against Tabal.	
	Sennacherib; Sîn-aḥḥē-erība	705 – 681 BC (24 years)	Son of Sargon II	Changed the Assyrian capital to Nineveh. Murdered by his eldest son Arda-Mulissu, who hoped to seize power for himself.	
	Esarhaddon; Aššur-aḫa-iddina	681 – 669 BC (12 years)	Son of Sennacherib. After Sennacherib was killed by Arda-Mulissu, Esarhaddon had to fight a six-week-long civil war against his brother before he successfully assumed the throne.	Brought Assyria to its greatest ever extent. Plagued by illnesses throughout his life. Died of natural causes on his way to campaign against Egypt.	
	Ashurbanipal; Aššur-bāni-apli	669 – 631 BC (38 years)	Son of Esarhaddon. Ashurbanipal's brother Shamash-shum-ukin inherited Babylonia, but after their civil war in 652–648 BC, Ashurbanipal strengthened his hold on the south as well.	Generally regarded as the last great Assyrian king. Fate unclear due to lack of surviving sources, probably died a natural death.	
Aššur-etil-ilāni; Aššur-etil-ilāni		631 – 627 BC (4 years)	Son of Ashurbanipal	Fate unclear due to the lack of surviving sources	
	Sîn-šumu-līšir (Note: Although he was a short-lived usurper who never achieved control of the Assyrian heartland, Sîn-šumu-līšir is generally counted among the kings of Assyria.); Sîn-šumu-līšir (usurper)	626 BC (3 months)	Prominent eunuch courtier and general. Influential under the reign of Aššur-etil-ilāni, rebelled upon the accession of Sîn-šar-iškun. Ruled only northern Babylonia.	The only eunuch to ever claim the throne of Assyria. Defeated by Sîn-šar-iškun.	
Sîn-šar-iškun; Sîn-šar-iškun		627 – 612 BC (15 years)	Son of Ashurbanipal, succeeded as king after Aššur-etil-ilāni's death (Note: Sîn-šar-iškun became king even though Aššur-etil-ilāni is known to have had sons of his own. Historically, it has often been assumed that Aššur-etil-ilāni was deposed by Sîn-šar-iškun after a civil war, but there is no contemporary evidence to support this.)	Killed by the forces of the Babylonians and Medes at the fall of Nineveh	
Aššur-uballiṭ II; Aššur-uballiṭ		612 – 609 BC (3 years)	Possibly son of Sîn-šar-iškun. Organized resistance against the Medes and Babylonians at Harran. Formally ruling with the title of crown prince since he was unable to undergo traditional coronation at Assur.	Defeated by the Babylonians at the Siege of Harran, fate thereafter unknown	

Genealogy of the Adaside Dynasty of Assyrian Kings

Genealogy of the Adaside Dynasty of Assyrian Kings

Adasi (fl. c. 1700 BC); Usurper, unrelated to previous kings	OLD ASSYRIAN PERIOD
Bel-bani c. 1700–1691 BC
Libaya c. 1690–1674 BC	Bazaya c. 1649–1622 BC	Lullaya c. 1621–1616 BC (unrelated; possibly a usurper)
Sharma-Adad I c. 1673–1662 BC	Shu-Ninua c. 1615–1602 BC
Iptar-Sin c. 1661–1650 BC	Sharma-Adad II c. 1601–1599 BC	Erishum III c. 1598–1586 BC
Shamshi-Adad II c. 1585–1580 BC
Shamshi-Adad III c. 1563–1548 BC	Ishme-Dagan II c. 1579–1564 BC
Ashur-nirari I c. 1547–1522 BC
Puzur-Ashur III c. 1521–1498 BC
Enlil-nasir I c. 1497–1485 BC
Nur-ili c. 1484–1473 BC	Ashur-rabi I c. 1472–1453 BC (usurped from his nephew)
Ashur-shaduni c. 1473 BC (1 month)
Ashur-nadin-ahhe I c. 1452–1431 BC	Ashur-nirari II c. 1424–1418 BC	Enlil-nasir II c. 1430–1425 BC (usurped from his brother)
Ashur-rim-nisheshu c. 1408–1401 BC	Ashur-bel-nisheshu c. 1417–1409 BC
Ashur-nadin-ahhe II c. 1400–1391 BC	Eriba-Adad I c. 1390–1364 BC
Ashur-uballit I 1363–1328 BC	Middle Assyrian period: 1363–912 BC, Adaside line /line of Ninurta-apal-Ekur
Enlil-nirari; 1327–1318 BC
Arik-den-ili; 1317–1306 BC
Adad-nirari I 1305–1274 BC
Shalmaneser I 1273–1244 BC	son of Adad-nirari I
Tukulti-Ninurta I 1243–1207 BC	son/grandson of Adad-nirari I
Ashur-nadin-apli; 1206–1203 BC	Ashur-nirari III; 1202–1197 BC (parentage uncertain)	Enlil-kudurri-usur; 1196–1192 BC	son/ great-grandson of Adad-nirari I
son/great-great-grandson of Adad-nirari I
Ninurta-apal-Ekur; 1191–1179 BC (usurper); Great-great-great-grandson of Adad-nirari I
Ashur-dan I 1178–1133 BC
Mutakkil-Nusku c. 1133 BC
Ashur-resh-ishi I 1132–1115 BC
Tiglath-Pileser I 1114–1076 BC
Asharid-apal-Ekur; 1075–1074 BC	Ashur-bel-kala; 1073–1056 BC a century-long period of decline followed Ashur-bel-kala's death	Shamshi-Adad IV; 1053–1050 BC (usurped from his nephew)
Eriba-Adad II; 1055–1054 BC	Ashurnasirpal I 1049–1031 BC
Shalmaneser II; 1030–1019 BC	Ashur-rabi II; 1012–972 BC
Ashur-nirari IV; 1018–1013 BC	Ashur-resh-ishi II; 971–967 BC
Tiglath-Pileser II; 966–935 BC
Ashur-dan II; 934–912 BC began to reconquer the territory lost under his predecessors
Adad-nirari II; 911–891 BC
Tukulti-Ninurta II; 890–884 BC
Ashurnasirpal II; 883–859 BC	Neo-Assyrian kings
Shalmaneser III; 859–824 BC
Shamshi-Adad V 824–811 BC
Adad-nirari III; 811–783 BC
Shalmaneser IV; 783–773 BC	Ashur-dan III; 773–755 BC	Ashur-nirari V 755–745 BC	Tiglath-Pileser III; 745–727 BC usurper, parentage in dispute, prob. per historians part of the royal family

Shalmaneser V 727–722 BC	Sargon II; 722–705 BC (parentage disputed)
Sennacherib; 705–681 BC
Esarhaddon; 681–669 BC
Shamash-shum-ukin (king of Babylon, 667–648 BC)	Ashurbanipal; 669–631 BC
Ashur-etil-ilani; 631–627 BC	Sinsharishkun; 627–612 BC
Ashur-uballit II; 612–609 BC (relationship unknown)

== Later Assyrian kingship ==
=== Geopolitical history and context ===
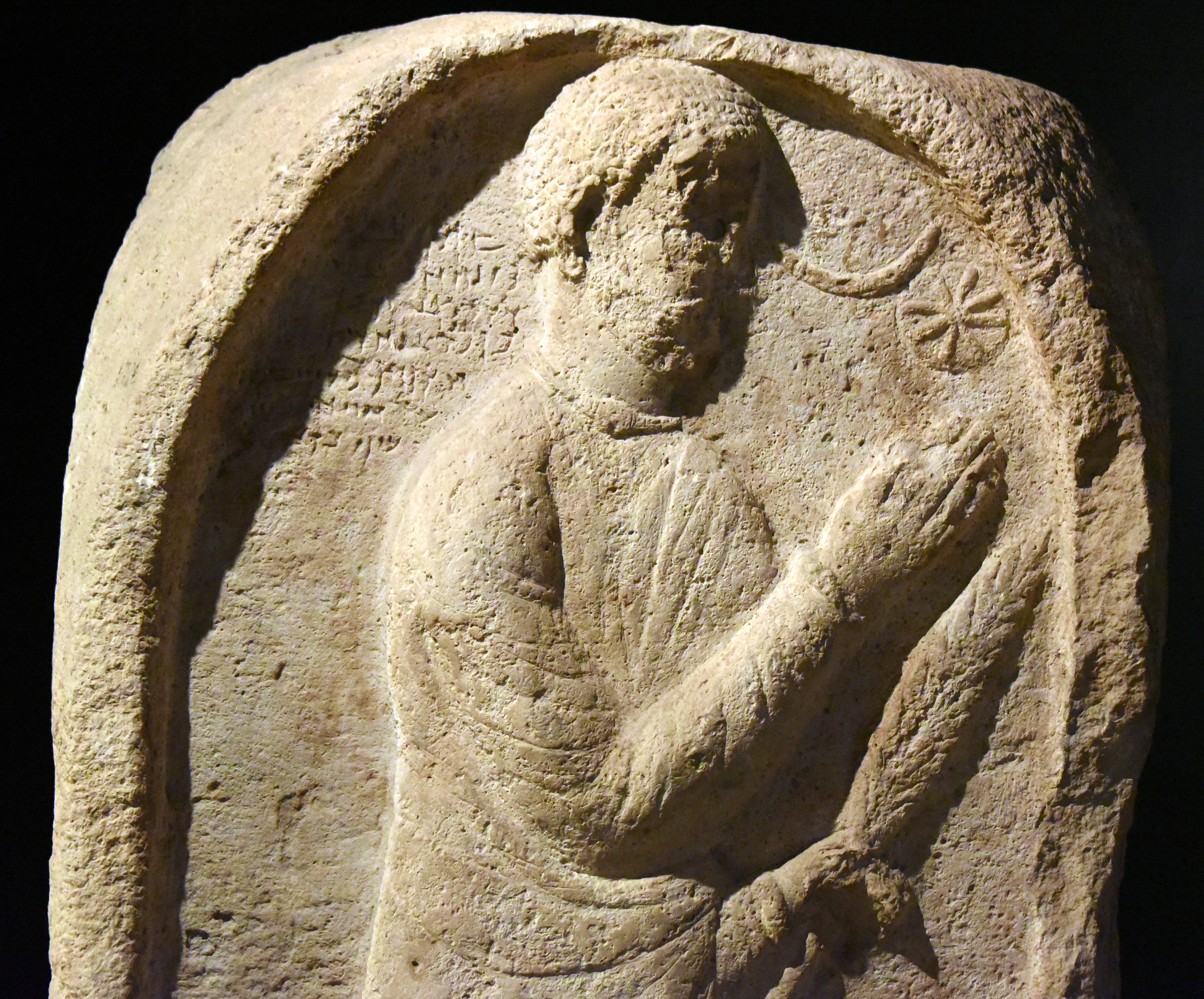
Detail of a stele in the style of the Neo-Assyrian royal steles erected in Assur in the 2nd century AD (under Parthian rule) by the local ruler Rʻuth-Assor

The defeat of Ashur-uballit II at Harran in 609 BC marked the end of the ancient Assyrian monarchy, which was never restored. The territory of the Assyrian Empire was split between the Neo-Babylonian and Median empires. The Assyrian people survived the fall of the empire, though Assyria continued to be a sparsely populated and marginal region under the Neo-Babylonian and later Achaemenid empires. Under the Seleucid and Parthian empires, Assyria experienced a remarkable recovery. Under the last two or so centuries of Parthian rule, archaeological surveys have shown that the region reached a density of settlements that is only comparable to what the region was like under the Neo-Assyrian Empire.

A semi-autonomous city-state under Parthian suzerainty appears to have formed around the city of Assur, (Note: According to the 12th-century AD hagiography of Mar Behnam there was also an independent Assyrian king at Nineveh in the fourth century AD, named Sinharib (i.e. Sennacherib). This figure is not attested elsewhere and is generally regarded to be an invented anachronistic and Christianized version of the ancient king Sennacherib, cast in a role befitting the then Christian Assyrians so that he could still be revered.) Assyria's oldest capital, near, or shortly after, the end of the 2nd century BC. In this period, the ancient city flourished, with some old buildings being restored and some new ones, such as a new palace, being constructed. The ancient temple dedicated to the god Ashur was also restored for the second time in the second century AD, and a cultic calendar effectively identical to that used under the Neo-Assyrian Empire was used. Stelae erected by the local rulers of Assur in this time resemble the stelae erected by the Neo-Assyrian kings, though the rulers are depicted in Parthian-style trouser-suits rather than ancient garb. The rulers used the title maryo of Assur ("master of Assur") and appear to have viewed themselves as continuing the old Assyrian royal tradition. These stelae retain the shape, framing and placement (often in city gates) of stelae erected under the ancient kings and also depict the central figure in reverence of the moon and sun, an ever-present motif in the ancient royal stelae. This second period of prominent Assyrian cultural development at Assur came to end with the conquests of the Sasanian Empire in the region, c. 240, whereafter the Ashur temple was destroyed again and the city's people were dispersed.

=== City-lords of Assur ===
The sequence of local rulers of Assur under the three or four centuries of Parthian suzerainty is poorly known. Only five names are attested and their dates, their precise order and how they relate to each other is not clear. The order used here follows Aggoula (1985). There are large gaps in this sequence.

Name	Timespan	Notes	Ref
Hormoz; Hormoz (or Hormez?)	Uncertain	Iranian name. Known from an inscription on a statue.	
Hayyay; Rāʾeḥat Hayyay	Uncertain	Arabic name. Mentioned in an inscription.	
Hanni; Ḥannī	Uncertain	Akkadian-derived Aramaic name. Mentioned as the father of a person (whose name is illegible) in a relief.	
Rʻuth-Assor; Rʿūṯʾassor	2nd century AD	Akkadian-derived Aramaic name. Mentioned in inscriptions and in his own stele.	
[unknown name]	2nd century AD	Indirectly mentioned in an inscription by his nephews, though his name is not preserved.	
Nbudayyan; Nḇūḏayyān	2nd century AD	Akkadian-derived Aramaic name. Mentioned in multiple inscriptions.	

== See also ==
- List of kings of Babylon – for the Babylonian kings
- List of Mesopotamian dynasties – for other dynasties and kingdoms in ancient Mesopotamia
- List of kings of Syria – the Seleucids who became kings of Syria
