= Kikkia =

King of Assur
- Reign: c. 2030 BC

Kikkia (sometimes given as Kikkiya), inscribed ^{m}Ki-ik-ki-a (Note: Khorsabad Kinglist, i 23.) (Note: SDAS Kinglist, i 22.) (fl. c. 2030 BC) was according to the Assyrian King List (AKL) the 28th Assyrian monarch, ruling in Assyria's early period during the 21st century BC. He is listed within a section of the AKL as the second out of the six, "kings whose eponyms are not known." As all the other early rulers listed in the king list and unattested elsewhere, there is dispute among scholars as to whether Kikkia was a real historical figure.

Apart from his appearance in two copies of the Assyrian King List (the Khorsabad and SDAS copies, but not the Nassouhi one which is damaged at the top where he might have appeared), he is only known from two building inscriptions of his successors, moreover; the earliest of these is that of Ashur-rim-nisheshu (c. 1398 BC — c. 1391 BC), who commemorated his reconstruction of the wall of the inner-city of Assur by listing the previous restorers on a commemorative cone, (Note: Cone VAT^{?} 2764.) (beginning with Kikkia.) The later king, Shalmaneser II, restored this wall and gave credit to his predecessor in his inscription. The erection of a defensive wall suggests that Kikkia may have won his independence from the waning influence of Ur. An earlier Assyrian šakkanakkum (KIŠ.NITA_{2}) chief magistrate and ruler of Assur, Zariqum, who had been omitted from the extant copies of the Assyrian King Lists, had been a contemporary and vassal of Shulgi and Amar-Sin, so one would suppose that Kikkia must have reigned after this time. Arthur Ungnad interpreted Kikkia's name, and that of Ushpia, as being that of the Hurrian language (BA VI, 5, S. 13), but more recent research no longer holds this thesis as tenable, and Arno Poebel was not convinced by the interpretation.

== See also ==
- Timeline of the Assyrian Empire
- Early Period of Assyria
- List of Assyrian kings
- Assyrian continuity
- Assyrian people
- Assyria

== Inscriptions ==
Preceded by	King of Assur c. 2030 BC	Succeeded by
