= Ila-kabkabu =

The Amorite name Ila-kabkabu appears twice in the Assyrian King List:

- Ila-kabkabu (Akkadian: 𒀭𒆏𒅗𒁉, romanized: ILA-KAB-ka-bi) appears within the Assyrian King List among the “kings whose fathers are known” (alongside both: Ila-kabkabu's father and predecessor, Yazkur-el; Ila-kabkabu's son and successor, Aminu),
- Ila-kabkabu of Terqa is also mentioned as the father of one other king named within the Assyrian King List: Šamši-Adad I. Šamši-Adad I had not inherited the Assyrian throne from his father, but had instead been a conqueror. Ila-kabkabu had been an Amorite king not of Aššur (within Assyria), instead Ila-kabkabu had been king of Terqa (within Syria) during the same time as that of the King Iagitlim of Mari (also within Syria.) According to the Mari Eponyms Chronicle, Ila-kabkabu had seized Shuprum (possibly c. 1790 BC), then Šamši-Adad I had, “entered his father's house,” (e.g.. Šamši-Adad I had succeeded Ila-kabkabu as the king of Terqa, within the following year.)^{:163} Šamši-Adad I had subsequently conquered a wide territory and had emerged as the king of Assyria, where he had founded an Amorite dynasty.

Arising from the two appearances of the name "Ila-kabkabu" within two different places of the Assyrian King List, the “kings whose fathers are known” section has often, although not universally been considered a list of Šamši-Adad I's ancestors. In keeping with this assumption, scholars have inferred that the original form of the Assyrian King List had been written among other things as an, “attempt to justify that Šamši-Adad I was a legitimate ruler of the city-state Aššur and to obscure his non-Assyrian antecedents by incorporating his ancestors into a native Assyrian genealogy.” According to this interpretation, both instances of the name would refer to the same man, Šamši-Adad I's father, whose line would have been interpolated into the list.

== See also ==
- Timeline of the Assyrian Empire
- List of Assyrian kings
- Assyria
