= Suhlamu =

Suhlamu (Akkadian: 𒆤𒆷𒀀𒈬, romanized: Suḫ_{4}-la-a-mu) was according to the Assyrian King List (AKL) the fourth Assyrian monarch, ruling in Assyria's early period, though he is not attested in any known contemporary artefacts. He is listed among the “seventeen kings who lived in tents” within the Mesopotamian Chronicles. Suhlamu is in the lists preceded by Yangi, and succeeded by Harharu.

== See also ==
- Timeline of the Assyrian Empire
- Early Period of Assyria
- List of Assyrian kings
- Assyrian continuity
- Assyrian people
- Assyria
