= Azarah =

Azarah (Akkadian: 𒀀𒍝𒊏𒄴, romanized: A-za-ra-aḫ) was according to the Assyrian King List (AKL) the 15th Assyrian monarch, ruling in Assyria's early period, though he is not attested in any known contemporary artefacts. He is listed as the fifteenth among the, "seventeen kings who lived in tents" on the Mesopotamian Chronicles. According to the Mesopotamian Chronicles, Azarah was preceded by Belu. Azarah is succeeded by Ushpia on the Mesopotamian Chronicles.

== See also ==
- Timeline of the Assyrian Empire
- Early Period of Assyria
- List of Assyrian kings
- Assyrian continuity
- Assyrian people
- Assyria
