= Hanu (Assyrian king) =

Hanu (Akkadian: 𒄩𒉡𒌑, romanized: Ḫa-nu-ú) was according to the Assyrian King List (AKL) the 10th Assyrian monarch, ruling in Assyria's early period, though he is not attested in any known contemporary artefacts. He is listed among the "seventeen kings who lived in tents" within the Mesopotamian Chronicles. Hanu is in the list preceded by Didanu, and succeeded by Zuabu.

== See also ==
- Timeline of the Assyrian Empire
- Early Period of Assyria
- List of Assyrian kings
- Assyrian continuity
- Assyrian people
- Assyria
