= Abazu (Assyrian king) =

Monarch of Aššūrāyu

Abazu (Akkadian: 𒀊𒀀𒍪, romanized: Ab-a-zu) was according to the Assyrian King List (AKL) the 13th Assyrian monarch, ruling in Assyria's early period, though he is not attested in any known contemporary artefacts. He is listed among the "seventeen kings who lived in tents" on the Mesopotamian Chronicles. According to the Mesopotamian Chronicles, Abazu was preceded by Nuabu. Abazu is succeeded by Belu on the Mesopotamian Chronicles.

== See also ==
- Timeline of the Assyrian Empire
- Early Period of Assyria
- List of Assyrian kings
- Assyrian continuity
- Assyrian people
- Assyria
