= Nuabu =

Nuabu (Akkadian: 𒉡𒀀𒁍, romanized: Nu-a-bu) was according to the Assyrian King List (AKL) the 12th Assyrian monarch, ruling in Assyria's early period, though he is not attested in any known contemporary artefacts. He is listed among the “seventeen kings who lived in tents” on the Mesopotamian Chronicles. According to the Mesopotamian Chronicles, Nuabu was preceded by Zuabu. Nuabu is succeeded by Abazu on the Mesopotamian Chronicles.

== See also ==
- Timeline of the Assyrian Empire
- Early Period of Assyria
- List of Assyrian kings
- Assyrian continuity
- Assyrian people
- Assyria
