= Imsu =

Imsu (Akkadian: 𒅎𒍮, romanized: Im-ZUM) was according to the Assyrian King List (AKL) the 7th Assyrian monarch, ruling in Assyria's early period, though he is not attested in any known contemporary artefacts. He is listed among the "seventeen kings who lived in tents" within the Mesopotamian Chronicles. Imsu is in the lists preceded by Mandaru, and succeeded by Harsu.

== See also ==
- Timeline of the Assyrian Empire
- Early Period of Assyria
- List of Assyrian kings
- Assyrian continuity
- Assyrian people
- Assyria
