= Mandaru =

Mandaru (Akkadian: 𒎙𒁕𒊒, romanized: Man-da-ru) was according to the Assyrian King List (AKL) the sixth Assyrian monarch, ruling in Assyria's early period, though he is not attested in any known contemporary artefacts. He is listed among the "seventeen kings who lived in tents" within the Mesopotamian Chronicles. Mandaru is in the lists preceded by Harharu, and succeeded by Imsu.

== See also ==
- Timeline of the Assyrian Empire
- Early Period of Assyria
- List of Assyrian kings
- Assyrian continuity
- Assyria
