= Zuabu =

Early Assyrian king

Zuabu (Akkadian: 𒍪𒀀𒁍, romanized: Zu-a-bu) was according to the Assyrian King List (AKL) the 11th Assyrian monarch, ruling in Assyria's early period. However, he is not attested in any known contemporary artefacts. He is among the "seventeen kings who lived in tents" within the Mesopotamian Chronicles. Zuabu is in the lists preceded by Hana, and succeeded by Nuabu.

== See also ==
- Timeline of the Assyrian Empire
- Early Period of Assyria
- List of Assyrian kings
- Assyrian continuity
- Assyrian people
- Assyria
