= Harharu =

Fifth Assyrian monarch

Harharu (Akkadian: 𒄯𒄩𒊒, romanized: Ḫar-ḫa-ru) was according to the Assyrian King List (AKL) the fifth Assyrian monarch, ruling in Assyria's early period, though he is not attested in any known contemporary artefacts. He was listed among the “seventeen kings who lived in tents” within the Mesopotamian Chronicles. Harharu is preceded in the lists by Suhlamu, and succeeded by Mandaru.

== See also ==
- Timeline of the Assyrian Empire
- Early Period of Assyria
- List of Assyrian kings
- Assyrian continuity
- Assyrian people
- Assyria
