= Belu (Assyrian king) =

Monarch of Aššūrāyu

Belu (Akkadian: 𒁁𒇻𒌑, romanized: Be-lu-ú) was according to the Assyrian King List (AKL) the 14th Assyrian monarch, ruling in Assyria's early period. However, he is not attested in any known contemporary artefacts. He is listed among the "seventeen kings who lived in tents" on the Mesopotamian Chronicles. According to the Mesopotamian Chronicles, Belu was preceded by Abazu. Belu is succeeded by Azarah on the Mesopotamian Chronicles.

== See also ==
- Belus (Assyrian)
- Timeline of the Assyrian Empire
- Early Period of Assyria
- List of Assyrian kings
- Assyrian continuity
- Assyrian people
- Assyria
