= Harsu =

Assyrian monarch

Harsu (Akkadian: 𒄯𒍮, romanized: Ḫar.Zum) was according to the Assyrian King List (AKL) the 8th Assyrian monarch, ruling in Assyria's early period, though he is not attested in any known contemporary artefacts. He is listed among the, "seventeen kings who lived in tents" within the Mesopotamian Chronicles. Harsu is in the list preceded by Imsu, and succeeded by Didanu.
