= Didanu =

Legendary Amorite ruler

Didanu (Akkadian: 𒁲𒁕𒀀𒉡 Didânu, Ugaritic: 𐎄𐎚𐎐 Ditānu) was a legendary Amorite ruler or ancestral figure attested in Mesopotamian and Ugaritic texts. His name is presumed to be derived from the term Tidnu, which in the third millennium BCE referred to a specific tribal group among the Amorites, as attested in sources from the times of Gudea and Shu-Sin. After the Ur III period, variants of this term only appear in literary texts, and by the end of the Bronze Age they were only ever used to designate a purely mythical figure. Various dynasties claimed descent from Didanu, including the kings of Assyria (possibly as early as during the reign of Shamshi-Adad I), the First Dynasty of Babylon, and the monarchs of Ugarit. In the last of these states, Didanu was also considered a deity.

== Etymology ==
The name Didanu (Ditanu) is presumed to share its origin with a variety of terms in Semitic languages derived from the root ddn or dtn, variously used as designations of tribes, toponyms, names of mythical ancestors and possibly of mythical animals. Attested examples include terms such Tidnu, Tidanum, Tidnum and Tidan. Gianni Marchesi anglicizes it as "Tidneans" as a term referring to a group of people. It has been suggested that all of these terms were related to didānu (ditānu), referring to an animal variously interpreted as bison, aurochs, or possibly a mythical creature, though this remains uncertain. It has been argued that the didānu might have functioned as an animal symbol of an Amorite clan which subsequently came to be designated by its name. Another view is that the name Ditanu and other related terms are cognates of the Akkadian word datnu, "warlike".

The form Tidnum occurs mostly in texts written in Sumerian from between the late third millennium BCE and the end of the Old Babylonian period. The oldest unambiguous example where the term occurs as a label referring to a group of people or a polity is an inscription of Gudea, though it might already be present as a toponym in Early Dynastic texts from Fara, Abu Salabikh and Ebla. The youngest attestation which can be dated with certainty has been identified in the Nippur Lament. Inscriptions from the Ur III period use the term Tidnum and its variants in parallel with other words referring to Amorites, one example being a reference to a wall constructed during the reign of Shu-Sin, referred to as the "Fender of Tidnim/Datnim" (mu-ri-iq ti-id-ni-im/ti-da-nim/da-at-ni-im) in Akkadian and as the "Mardu Wall" (BAD_{3} MAR.DU_{2}) in Sumerian. However, an earlier administrative text from Ebla differentiates between Amorites and DA-DA-nu, possibly an early variant of Tidnum. Based on another inscription of Shu-Sin, it is presumed that the latter label was more specific, and designated just one group among people referred to as Amorites in lower Mesopotamia. Presumably, they inhabited the steppes in Northern Mesopotamia or in a part of Syria. Proposed locations associated with them include areas around Jebel Hamrin, Jebel Bishri or Jebel Abdel Aziz. It is possible that multiple of these proposals are correct, and the area inhabited by them changed across time. After the Ur III period the term seemingly never refers to a contemporary polity or ethnic group, and is restricted to literary texts. Only a single inscription can be attributed to a Tidnean, a dedication to the goddess Belet-Šuḫnir discovered in the proximity of modern Kirkuk whose author refers to himself as "Ammîštamar, son of Didaniyum". By the late Bronze Age, the term functioned only as the name of a mythical royal ancestor, who is agreed to not be a historical figure.

== In Mesopotamia ==
In the Assyrian King List (AKL), known from copies from between the eleventh and eighth century but most likely composed earlier, Didanu is described as one of the "seventeen kings who lived in tents", the ancestors of Shamshi-Adad I, a historical Amorite chieftain who built an empire in Upper Mesopotamia centered in Assur. Jean-Jacques Glassner suggests that he might have originally commissioned the preparation of this text. It might have been intended to be a strictly Assyrian counterpart of the Sumerian King List. Like other Mesopotamian king lists, the Assyrian King List was composed to affirm the prestige to the reigning monarchs through invented genealogies. Didanu is the ninth of the rulers listed. He is preceded by Ḫarṣu and followed by Ḫanû. These three names, as well as the other rulers listed in the same section, presumably all originated as Amorite toponyms, theonyms, tribal endonyms or eponymous ancestors. However, it is unlikely that the sequence directly reflects a preexisting oral tradition.

Didanu is also mentioned among the ancestors of the First Dynasty of Babylon in a text from the reign of Ammi-Saduqa (1646–1626 BCE) recording the provisions meant for a kispum, a ritual banquet meant to honor the dead. It is agreed that he is the same figure as the Assyrian Didanu, and the text presumably reflects the incorporation of the list of Shamsi-Adad I's legendary ancestors into a new tradition. It also mentions other names from the aforementioned section of the Assyrian King List, but their spelling and order in some cases vary. In this case, Didanu's predecessor is Namzu, and he is in turn followed by Zummabu.

Ammi-saduqa's predecessor, Ammi-Ditana, bore an Amorite name which can be translated as "my paternal uncle is Didanu". Another king from the same dynasty was named Samsu-Ditana, "sun of Didanu". As early as in the Sargonic period, and through Old Babylonian times, Didanu and various variant forms are also attested a component of other personal names, such as Ditanu-sar ("Didanu is a sovereign") or Abi-Ditanu ("my father is Didanu"). An early possibly Akkadian name, ME-^{d}Di-ta-an (possibly to be read as Simat-Ditan), renders the name with the so-called divine determinative (dingir), a sign used to designate theonyms in cuneiform, but deification of Didanu is a rarely attested phenomenon in Mesopotamian sources. It has nonetheless been argued that he could be considered an Amorite deity.

== In Ugarit ==
Didanu is also attested in the Ugaritic texts. Similarly as in Mesopotamia, two forms of his name are attested, ddn and dtn, with the latter being more common. They can be vocalized as Didānu and Ditānu, respectively. It cannot be established if one of the two should be understood as an archaic form, or if the spelling with a /d/ is the result of voicing the voiceless /t/ due to the next consonant being voiced. Mary E. Buck argues that the references to him are among the passages which can be considered evidence of Ugaritic kings believing themselves to be the descendants of a nomadic Amorite tribe. He is attested as an ancestor of both the royal family and a mythical king, Kirta. Mary R. Bachvarova suggests that his incorporation into the local tradition reflected an attempt to connect the royal dynasty to a recognizable legendary one. Presumably the Ugaritic royal family claimed descent from the same Amorite clan as other rulers whose genealogies mention Didanu.

There is evidence that in Ugaritic religion Didanu was regarded as a deity. A text dealing with the veneration of deceased ancestors, RS 34.126, mentions Didanu. Dennis Pardee identifies it as the only Ugaritic text of indisputably funerary character. Most likely it describes the preparations for a ceremony centered on the second to last king of Ugarit, Niqmaddu III. It refers to the "assembly of Didānu", which is invoked to observe the funeral of the deceased king and to receive offerings. While multiple kings are named in this text, the majority of them are not historical figures. They are identified as rapa’ūma, presumably ancestors of the royal family, and they are said to belong to Didanu's clan. Jordi Vidal argues that Didanu cannot be interpreted as a king in this context, but only as the eponym of the clan. Didanu additionally appears in a passage repeated twice in the Epic of Kirta, where the eponymous ruler is also said to be a member of the same clan as him. According to Pardee, this indicates that Kirta was apparently understood as a figure less ancient than him, despite also belonging to the sphere of myth. In another Ugaritic text, RS 24.272, a deity addressed as the "lord of the great gods" (ʾadn ʾilm rbm) visits Didanu to ask him about the health of a child. Presumably the last of these figures is also to be interpreted as a deity, but the instructions issued by Didanu in response served as a model for rituals meant to be performed to help human children.

Both variants of Didanu's name also occur as a component of Ugaritic given names.

One text Ugarit (RS 24.248) reports a ritual offering for the temple of Ditänu.

== Other attestations ==
In the Hebrew Bible Dedan, a cognate of Didanu, appears as an ordinary given name in Numbers 16:1, Deuteronomy 11:6 and Psalm 106:17.

It has been suggested that the name of the ancient city Dadan or Dadan, located in the northern part of the Arabian Peninsula in the oasis Al-'Ula and attested in an inscription of Nabonidus (^{uru}Da-da-nu), was derived from the same root as the name of Didanu. However, this connection is considered uncertain by Gianni Marchesi.

Mary R. Bachvarova argues that the name of the Titans from Greek mythology was derived from Didanu. However, according to Ian Rutherford the phonetic similarity might be accidental, and it is difficult to explain how the name of a singular legendary ancestor would be generalized into a term referring to a group of ancestral deities.
