= Ushpia =

Ushpia (Akkadian: 𒍑𒉿𒀀, romanized: Uš-pi-a) was according to the Assyrian King List (AKL) the 16th Assyrian monarch, ruling in Assyria's early period during the late 22nd or early 21st century BC,, though he is not attested in any known contemporary artefacts. The list places him as the second last within the section "kings who lived in tents”. According to the Cambridge Ancient History, the conclusion of this section, "marked the end of the nomadic period of the Assyrian people." Ushpia is alleged to have founded the temple for the god Aššur within the city-state of Aššur, according to the much later inscriptions of both of these Assyrian kings: Shalmaneser I (fl. c. 1273 BC) and Esarhaddon (fl. 681 BC). Ushpia is succeeded on the AKL by Apiashal. Arthur Ungnad interpreted both Ushpia's and Kikkia's names as being that of the Hurrian language (as opposed to the Assyrian dialect of the Semitic Akkadian language), but; Arno Poebel was not convinced by this interpretation and more recent research no longer holds Ungnad's thesis as tenable.

== See also ==
- Timeline of the Assyrian Empire
- Early Period of Assyria
- List of Assyrian kings
- Assyrian continuity
- Assyrian people
- Assyria
