= Apiashal =

Apiashal (Akkadian: 𒀀𒉿𒀀𒊩, romanized: A-pi-a-ŠAL) was according to the Assyrian King List (AKL) the 17th Assyrian monarch, ruling in Assyria's early period during the 21st century BC.

He has been listed within the section of the AKL as the last of whom, "altogether seventeen kings, tent dwellers." This section shows marked similarities to the later appearing ancestors of the First Babylonian dynasty. The AKL also states that Apiashal had been preceded by his father Ushpia. Additionally, the AKL states that Apiashal had been succeeded by his son Hale.

Apiashal is also listed within a section of the AKL as the first out of the ten, "kings whose fathers are known.” This section (which in contrast to the rest of the list) had been written in reverse order—beginning with Aminu and ending with Apiashal, "altogether ten kings who are ancestors"—has sometimes been interpreted as the list of ancestors of the Amorite Šamši-Adad I (fl. c. 1808 BCE – c. 1776 BCE) who had conquered the city-state of Aššur. In keeping with this assumption, scholars have inferred that the original form of the Assyrian King List had been written (among other things) as an, “attempt to justify that Šamši-Adad I was a legitimate ruler of the city-state Aššur and to obscure his non-Assyrian antecedents by incorporating his ancestors into a native Assyrian genealogy.” However, this interpretation has not been accepted universally; the Cambridge Ancient History rejected this interpretation and instead interpreted the section as being that of the ancestors of Sulili.

== See also ==
- Timeline of the Assyrian Empire
- Early Period of Assyria
- List of Assyrian kings
- Assyrian people
- Assyria
