= 20th century BC =

One hundred years, from 2000 BC to 1901 BC

The 20th century BC was a century that lasted from the year 2000 BC to 1901 BC.

== The period of the 2nd Millennium BC ==
Map of the world in 2000 BC.

== Events ==
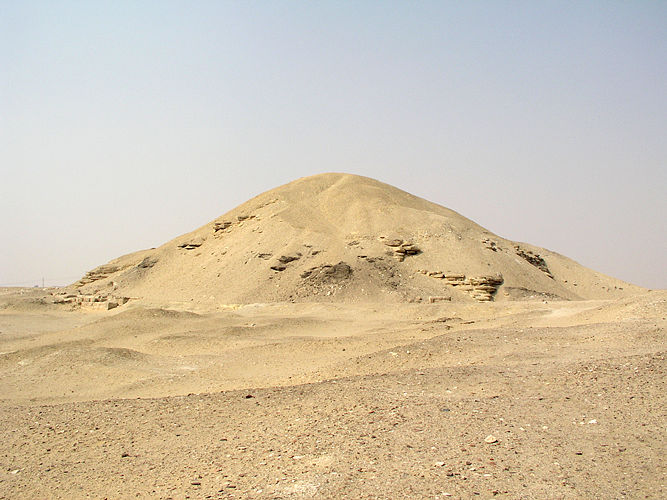
The pyramid ruin of Amenemhet I at Lisht. He was the founder of the Twelfth Dynasty of Egypt

- c. 2000 BC:
  - Farmers and herders traveled south from modern-day Ethiopia and settled in what is now Kenya.
  - Dawn of the Capacha Culture in modern-day Colima, Mexico.
  - Humans settle in Matanchén, modern day Nayarit, Mexico
  - Arrival of the ancestors of the Latins in Italy.
  - Town of Mantua was founded.
  - First of the Minoan palaces on Crete. Site of palace complex Knossos started to become occupied.
  - Bronze Age began in north Ancient China.
  - Middle Jōmon period ended in Japan.
  - Decline of Harappan civilization began.
  - The Harappa Torso was sculpted by a member of the Indus Valley culture.
  - Vessel, from Asahi Mound, Toyama Prefecture, was made. Jōmon period. It is now kept at Collection of Tokyo University.
  - Dogū, from Kurokoma, Yamanashi Prefecture, was made. Jōmon period. It is now kept at Tokyo National Museum.
  - Stonehenge construction largely completed.
  - Dawn of the Lal-lo and Gattaran Shell Middens pilings in what are now the Philippine Islands.
  - Horses were tamed and used for transport.
  - The last woolly mammoths die on Wrangel Island around this time, rendering the species extinct.
- c. 2000 BC – 1900 BC: the "Priest-king torso" was sculpted at Mohenjo-Daro, part of the Indus Valley Civilization.
- c. 1995 BC: Pharaoh Mentuhotep II, Eleventh dynasty of Egypt dies.
- c. 1995 BC: Ancient Egypt: Pharaoh Mentuhotep IV died. End of Eleventh Dynasty. Pharaoh Amenemhat I started to rule. Start of Twelfth Dynasty.
- c. 1985 BC: Political authority became less centralized in Ancient Egypt.
- c. 1985 BC – 1795 BC:
  - Rock-cut tombs at Beni Hasan were made. Twelfth Dynasty.
  - "Hippopotamus", from the tomb of Senbi (governor) (Tomb B.3) at Meir was made. Twelfth Dynasty. It is now in the Metropolitan Museum of Art, New York.
- 1974 BC: Erishum I became the thirty-third ruler of Assyria.
- 1953 BC: Senusret I launches a military campaign against Lower Nubia and conquers the region down to the Second Cataract.
- February 27, 1953 BC: A very close alignment of the naked-eye planets took place in which these planets are together in a span of 4.3 degrees.
- March 5, 1953 BC: A computer calculated alignment of the naked-eye planets took place in a new moon, and in spring season, and is believed by researchers from NASA, to be the starting event for the Chinese calendar, as they followed descriptions from a 1st Century B.C. Chinese passage "Hong Fan Zhuan" by 'Liu Xiang', to search for this astronomical event being described to have happened about 2000 BC at Pegasus constellation (Yingshi).
- c. 1942 BC: The so-called king of Leubingen (today part of Sömmerda) was buried in a large barrow within a 66-foot-wide (20 m) stone cairn inside a ring ditch.
- c. 1928 BC – 1895 BC: "Harvest scene", tempera facsimile by Nina de Garis Davies of wall painting in the tomb of Khnumhotep II, Beni Hasan. Twelfth Dynasty.
- 1924 BC: Gungunum, king of Larsa, conquers Isin and takes its king Lipit-Ishtar into captivity. (Middle chronology)
- c. 1920 BC: Jishi Gorge flood. It may have sparked the beginning of the first Chinese dynasty (Xia, Erlitou culture)
- 1917 BC: Bön founder Tonpa Shenrab Miwoche is born.
- 1913 BC – 1903 BC: Egyptian-Nubian war.
- c. 1900 BC: Shalim-ahum and his son Ilu-shuma began to rule the city of Assur at around this time.

== Inventions, discoveries, introductions ==
- c. 2000 BC: Glass appears.
- 2000 BC: In the Old Assyrian Empire, the Sumerian cuneiform had evolved into Old Assyrian cuneiform, with many modifications to Sumerian orthography.
- c. 1900 BC: Cacao is domesticated by the Mokaya in modern-day Guatemala.
