= San Blas, Nayarit =

San Blas
- Municipality
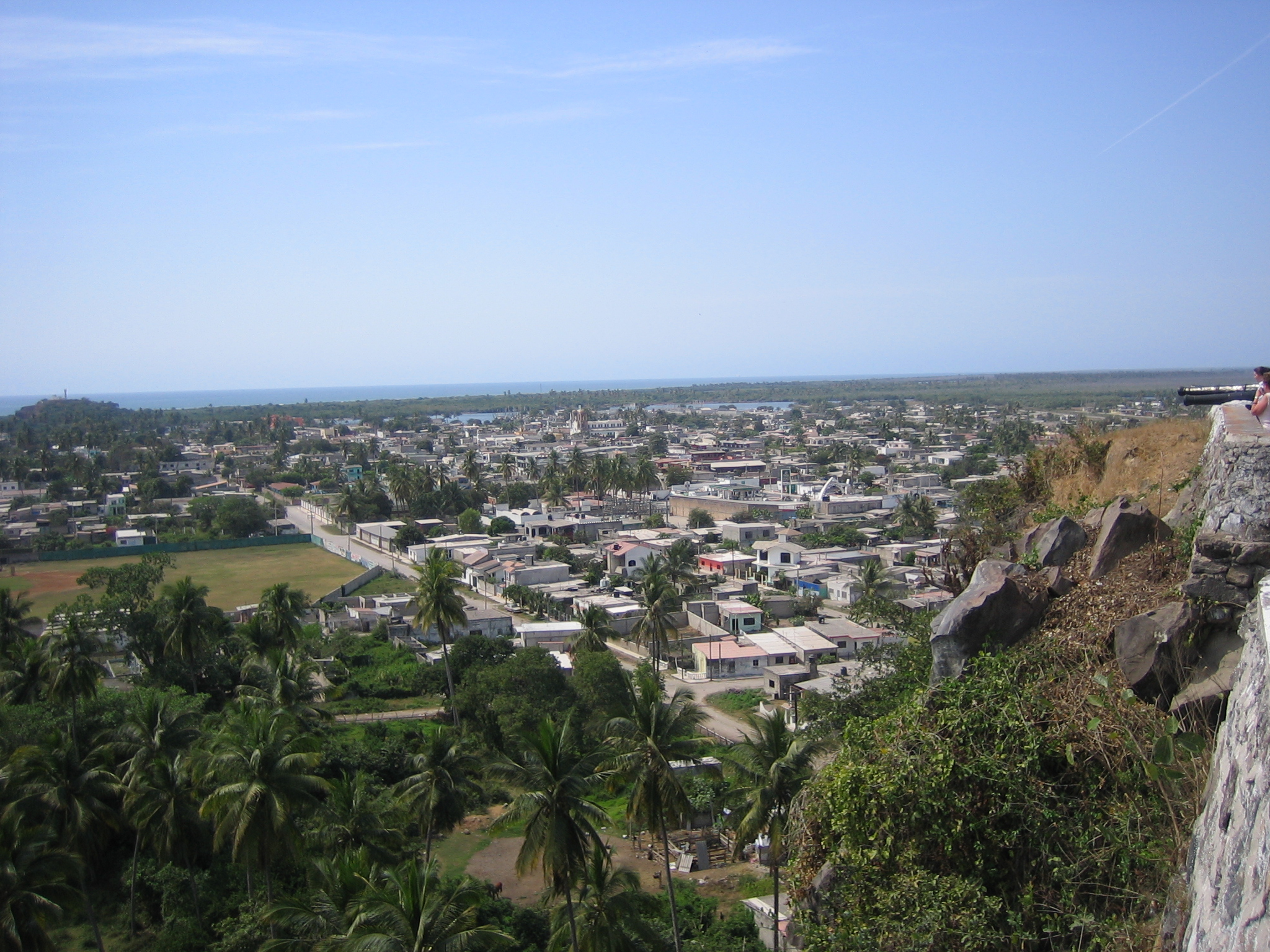
- Panorama of San Blas

- Location of San Blas municipality in Nayarit

- Location of San Blas in Mexico
- Coordinates: 21°32′23″N 105°17′8″W
- Country: Mexico
- State: Nayarit
- Founded: 1530
- Founder: Nuño de Guzmán
- Seat: San Blas

Government
  - Presidente municipal: José Antonio Barajas López
  - Federal electoral district: Nayarit's 1st

Area
  - Municipality: 823.6 km^{2} (318.0 sq mi)
- Highest elevation: 30 m (98 ft)

Population (2020)
  - Municipality: 37,478
  - Density: 45.51/km^{2} (117.9/sq mi)
  - Urban: 10,187
- Time zone: UTC-7 (Zona Pacífico)
- Postal Code: 63740
- Area Code: 323
- Website: sanblas.nayarit.gob.mx

San Blas is both a municipality and municipal seat located on the Pacific coast of Mexico in Nayarit.

In 2023, the town of San Blas was designated a Pueblo Mágico by the Mexican government, recognizing its cultural and historical importance.

== City ==
San Blas is a port and popular tourist destination, located about 160 kilometres (99 mi) north of Puerto Vallarta, and 64 kilometres (40 mi) west of the state capital Tepic, and three hours drive from Guadalajara. The town has a population of 8,707.

== Municipality ==
The municipality had a population of 37,478 in 2005. The Islas Marías, the site of the former Islas Marías Federal Prison, are part of the municipality. President Andrés Manuel López Obrador announced in 2021 that the former prison would be rehabilitated as the environmental and cultural education center "Muros de Agua-José Revueltas" in honor of the writer who was imprisoned there.

== History ==
In 1768, the Bourbon Visitador José de Gálvez decided to found the port of San Blas as a jumping off point for military expeditions to Sinaloa, Sonora, Baja California and Alta California. The military nature of San Blas distinguished it from the commercial port of Acapulco to the south. A subtext to the founding of San Blas may have been Gálvez' desire to curtail tax evasion on trade with Asia out of Acapulco, which was controlled by businessmen of Mexico City. Both Acapulco and San Blas tied New Spain to Asia through Manila. Gálvez also founded a shipyard in San Blas, with the next shipyard being Cavite in the Philippines. From 1774, navy ships delivered mail from San Blas to Manila. By tradition, the crew could carry private merchandise, so there was a small commercial subtext to San Blas from its inception In the 1790s, the Bourbon monarchy approved special permits for private ships to sail from Cadiz to San Blas. In 1801 and 1807, two ships of the Royal Philippine Company stopped in San Blas, though they were officially permitted only to sail to Lima. It was not until crisis broke out in the Spanish Empire in 1810 that San Blas opened its ports to trade between Lima, Panama, San Blas, Guaymas, Monterey and Manila. Silver mined in Mexico's northwest was shipped out of San Blas to pay for imports of goods, particularly from Panama, which was flooded with British products that entered through Jamaica on the other side of the isthmus.

At first, only two ships were assigned to the port: the packet ship San Carlos, commanded by Juan Pérez, and El Principe, commanded by Vicente Vila. Gálvez ordered four new vessels to be built, one of which was the schooner Sonora, later sailed in 1775 by Juan Francisco de la Bodega y Quadra to Alaska.

In many ways, San Blas was a poor choice for a deep sea harbor and settlement. The harbor was so small that it could never hold more than four ships at a time. Silting caused by the nearby Río Grande de Santiago resulted in the need for the harbor to be regularly dredged. The climate's stifling humidity and torrential rains from July to October, coupled with extensive mangrove swamps that surrounded the settlement, resulted in San Blas being plagued by clouds of voracious mosquitoes. A variety of sicknesses were endemic, including dysentery, typhoid fever, malaria, and other fevers. Naval officers and workers regularly complained about the climate. When Alessandro Malaspina visited in 1791, he found San Blas's climate so unhealthy that he refused to stay there, instead transferring his operations and some of San Blas' ships and personnel to Acapulco. San Blas's location was useful and logical, however, because it minimized travel time from Guadalajara and Mexico City without increasing the total distance to the Californias. Also, the area around San Blas had a plentiful supply of hardwoods useful for ship building and repair. Fresh water was also available year round.

A hillside fort was built in 1760 to defend the town's sea trade with the Philippines. Its front has stone carvings of the kings of Spain. On the hill behind the fort are the ruins of the Church of Our Lady of the Rosary, built in 1769. The ruins once contained the bronze bells that are said to have inspired Henry Wadsworth Longfellow's poem, "The Bells of San Blas". The ruins of a 19th-century customs house are on Calle Benito Juárez, three blocks from the main plaza.

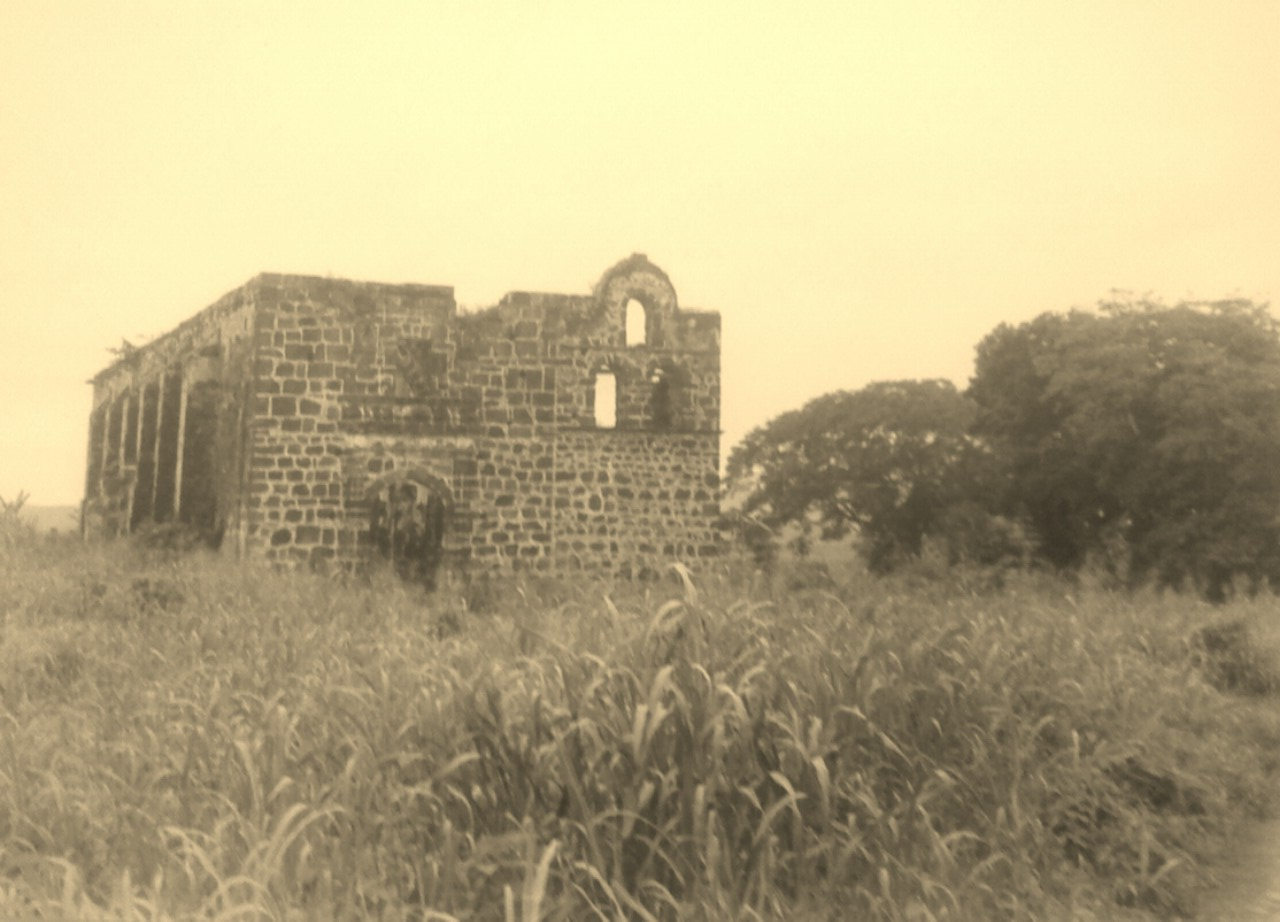
Ruins of a Colonial church on the Contaduría Hill, in San Blas

During the colonial period, hardwood forests provided the raw materials for ships that did a brisk trade with the Philippines and the Manila galleon until the shipping moved to the port at Manzanillo, and later to Acapulco.

=== Modern history ===
In 2021, ejidatarios (farmers) from Jolotemba and nearby communities blocked access to the luxury tourist complex "Limoncitos Hills" owned by Canadian developer Angela Birkenbach. The complaints go back to 2019, when the developer deforested virgin land, without permission. Birkenbach's latest move was to take over an access road and 1.6 kilometres (0.99 mi) of virgin beach, one of the last along the Nayarit coast.

== San Blas and California ==
Spain's colony in California was supplied by two supply ships out of San Blas which arrived once a year. on March 12, 1768 Junípero Serra, Father President of the California Missions, departed for California on the locally built barque Purísima Concepción.

On March 16, 1775, the San Carlos was set to depart San Blas, Mexico, for San Francisco Bay, stopping in Monterey to unload supplies for the mission there. The vessel was a product of the shipyard established on the Santiago River. Her length was 58 feet, the officers and men numbered 30.

== San Blas and Nootka ==
San Blas also became the base for Spanish expeditions to the Pacific Northwest. The Chinese were willing to pay up to $120 per otter hide ($3243 in 2025 dollars) which stimulated exploration of the Northwestern Pacific. From 1789 to 1795, San Blas was responsible for establishing and maintaining the Spanish post at Nootka Sound and Fort San Miguel (in present day British Columbia). For about twenty years in the late 18th century, San Blas was one of the busiest ports and shipbuilding centers on the Pacific coast of the Americas, rivaling Acapulco, the eastern terminus of the trans-Pacific Manila galleon convoy.

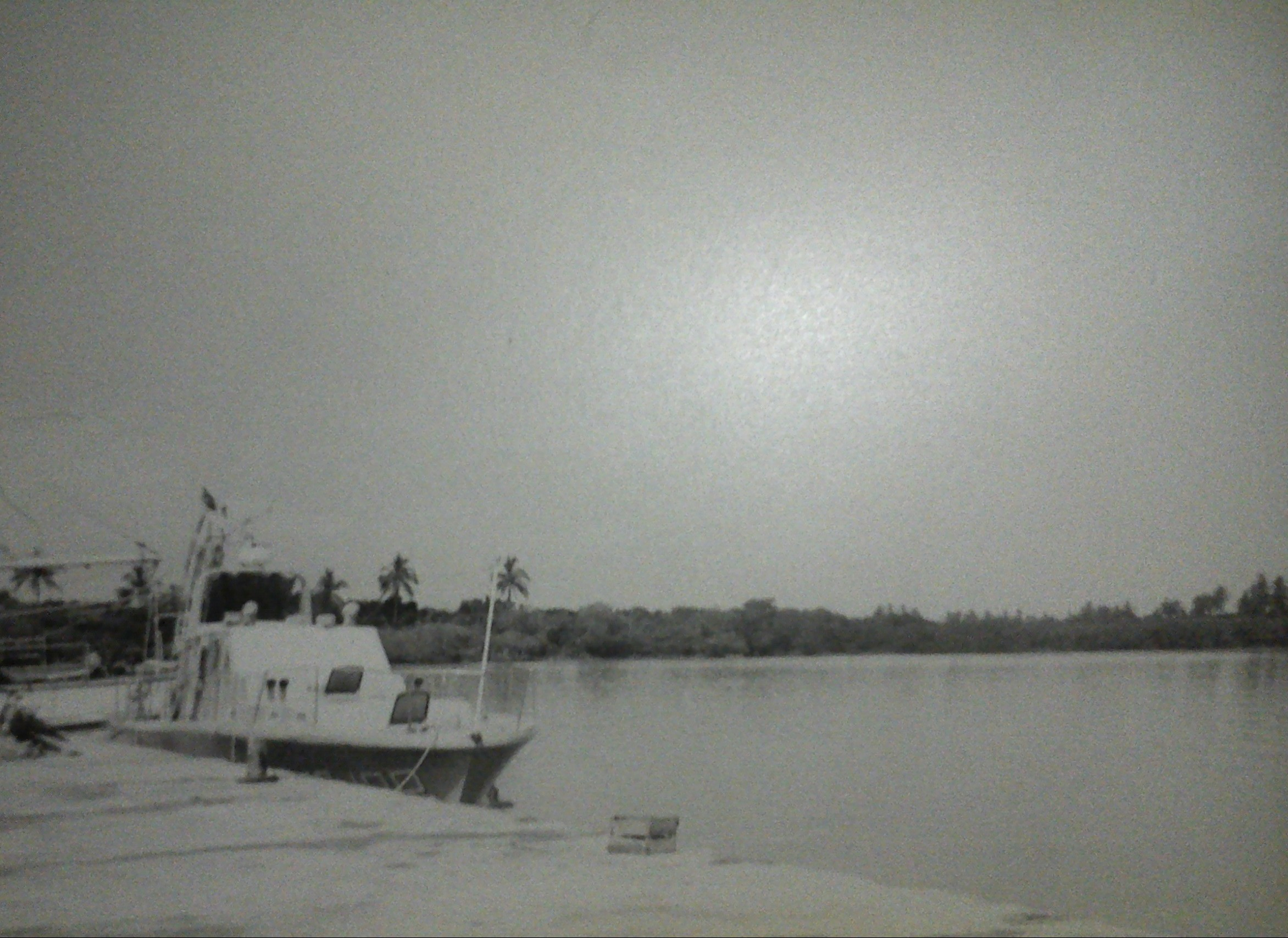
A dock in San Blas

At its height, the town had 30,000 inhabitants and became headquarters of Spain's General of the Southern Seas.

=== Yaqui deportations ===
During the 1900s, San Blas served as the arrival port for thousands of Yaqui men, women and children forcibly removed from their lands and sold into slavery. At San Blas, these families were forcibly marched 200 miles to San Marcos and its train station. Those who did not die on the march were sold into slavery at San Marcos, where they were deported to the sugar cane plantations in Oaxaca, the tobacco planters of the Valle Nacional, and the henequen plantation owners of the Yucatán for use as slave labor. Most of the enslaved workers died within the first year of their captivity.

== Government ==
=== Municipal presidents ===
Term	Municipal president	Political party	Notes
1917–1918	Jesús N. Jiménez		
1919–1920	Luis Jordán		
1921–1922	Leonardo Quirarte		
1923	Daniel F. Martínez		
1924	Francisco L. Camberos		
1925	Guillermo A. Martínez		
1926	Rufino Quintero		
1927	Narciso de León		
1928	Maximiliano Morales		
1929–1931	Narciso Corona Tamayo	PNR	
1932–1933	Leonardo Quirarte	PNR	
1933–1934	Basilio Flores Moreno	PNR	
1935–1936	Francisco González García	PNR	
1937–1938	Antonio Parra	PNR	
1939–1940	Lázaro Llanos	PRM	
1941–1942	Ramón López Rentería	PRM	
1943–1944	Ignacio Benítez Arias	PRM	
1945	Leonardo Pérez	PRM	
1946–1948	Pedro Betancourt Ramírez	PRI	
1949–1951	Narciso Corona Tamayo	PRI	
1952–1954	Manuel Yerena Alatorre	PRI	
1955–1957	Florentino Neza Plantillas	PRI	
1958–1960	Eugenio Plantillas Grajeda	PRI	
1961–1963	Juan García Gutiérrez	PRI	
1964–1966	Joel Robles Uribe	PRI	
1967–1969	Jorge R. Careaga Pérez	PRI	
1970–1971	Marcelino Márquez Uribe	PRI	
1971–1972	José Cruz Pacheco	PRI	
1973–1975	Rafael Gutiérrez Villaseñor	PRI	
1976–1978	Armando Trigueros Guerrero	PRI	
1978	Daniel Ibarra Guerrero	PRI	
1978–1981	Ponciano Bugarín Villa	PRI	
1982–1983	Ismael Hermosillo Hernández	PRI	
1984–1987	José Luis Lizaola H.	PRI	
1987–1990	Raúl Hermosillo Hernández	PRI	
1990–1993	Abelino Márquez Estrada	PRI	
1993–1993	Anselmo Hernández Sojo	PRI	
1996–1999	Carlos Luna Quirarte	PRI	
1999–2002	Alejandro Dávalos Valdés	PAN	
2002–2005	Eduardo Bernal Regalado	PRI	
2005–2008	Miguel Bernal Carrillo	PAN	
2008–2011	Hilario Ramírez Villanueva "Layín"	PAN	
2011–2014	Porfirio López Lugo	PRI	
2014–2017	Hilario Ramírez Villanueva "Layín"	Independent candidate	
2017–2021	Candy Anisoara Yescas Blancas	PRI	
17-09-2021–16-09-2024	José Antonio Barajas López	PAN; PRI; PRD	Coalition "Va por Nayarit"
17-09-2024–	José Antonio Barajas López	PAN; PRI; PRD	Coalition "Fuerza y Corazón por México" Reelected

== Climate ==
Climate data for San Blas
Month	Jan	Feb	Mar	Apr	May	Jun	Jul	Aug	Sep	Oct	Nov	Dec	Year
Mean daily maximum °C (°F)	28.0 (82.4)	28.2 (82.8)	28.8 (83.8)	30.2 (86.4)	31.9 (89.4)	33.3 (91.9)	34 (93)	34.1 (93.4)	33.8 (92.8)	33.8 (92.8)	31.7 (89.1)	29.0 (84.2)	31.4 (88.5)
Daily mean °C (°F)	22.1 (71.8)	22.1 (71.8)	22.5 (72.5)	24 (75)	26.3 (79.3)	28.8 (83.8)	29.3 (84.7)	29.4 (84.9)	29.2 (84.6)	28.8 (83.8)	26.2 (79.2)	23.4 (74.1)	26 (79)
Mean daily minimum °C (°F)	16 (61)	15.9 (60.6)	16.2 (61.2)	18 (64)	20.7 (69.3)	24.3 (75.7)	24.7 (76.5)	24.8 (76.6)	24.7 (76.5)	24 (75)	20.6 (69.1)	18 (64)	20.6 (69.1)
Average precipitation mm (inches)	20 (0.8)	13 (0.5)	5.1 (0.2)	0 (0)	20 (0.8)	130 (5.1)	340 (13.3)	390 (15.4)	360 (14.2)	120 (4.9)	13 (0.5)	23 (0.9)	1,440 (56.8)
Source: Weatherbase

== Recreation and tourism ==
The area is noted for its surfing. Playa de Matanchen was famous for having the longest surfable wave in the world, as listed in the Guinness Book of World Records. A hurricane and subsequent storm surge filled part of the bay with sand, greatly reducing the size of the waves.

The area has an abundance of migratory birds in the surrounding estuaries and lowland palm forests, attracting significant numbers of birders. The Christmas Bird Count regularly finds well over 200 species, with a record 292 species in 1983.

The town is also a gateway, along with the nearby village of Matanchen, to the La Tovara park, an extensive mangrove forest and federally protected nature preserve accessible by small boat.

The formerly elegant Playa Hermosa, built in 1951, is on a lonely and beautiful stretch of beach about a mile from the plaza. In the 1960s, Hollywood had a brief hideaway flirtation with San Blas when actors, including Lee Marvin, discovered San Blas for its fishing. The hotel is now abandoned.

== Economy ==
The economy is based on agriculture, fishing, and the tourist industry. The main crops are beans, sorghum, tobacco, corn, watermelon, and citrus fruits. There is a substantial cattle herd, and shrimp are raised in the extensive marshlands.

== In popular culture ==
The San Blas Pier is the inspiration for the hit song "En el muelle de San Blas" by the Mexican rock band Maná. The song was inspired by Rebeca Méndez Jiménez who waited at the pier for 41 years for her fiancé fisherman Manuel to come back from a fishing trip. It is believed he died in a sea storm, in October 1971, amidst the Hurricane Priscilla.

=== San Blas in a poem ===
The last poem penned by American poet Henry Wadsworth Longfellow was "The Bells of San Blas", included in his book In the Harbor. He wrote it a few days before his passing.

Fragments:
But to me, a dreamer of dreams,/ To whom what is and what seems/ Are often one and the same,/ The Bells of San Blas to me/ Have a strange, wild melody,/ And are something more than a name./
[...]
O Bells of San Blas in vain/ Ye call back the Past again;/ The Past is deaf to your prayer!/ Out of the shadows of night/ The world rolls into light;/ It is daybreak everywhere.//

== See also ==
- Marismas Nacionales-San Blas mangroves
