= Ilu-shuma =

King of Assyria in the 20th century BC

Ilu-šūma
- Išši’ak Aššur
- Reign: 20th century BC
- Predecessor: Shalim-ahum
- Successor: Erishum I
- Born: 20th century BC
- Died: 20th century BC
- Issue: Erishum I
- Father: Shalim-ahum

Ilu-shuma or Ilu-šūma, inscribed DINGIR-šum-ma, (Note: Khorsabad copy of the Assyrian King List i 24, 26.) son of Shalim-ahum was a king of Assyria in the early 20th century BC. The length of his reign is uncertain though he died in 1975 BC,, as the Assyrian King List records him as one of the "six kings whose names were written on bricks, but whose eponyms are not known", referring to the lists of officials after which years were named.

His son, Erishum I, is identified as the king who succeeded him and reigned for 40 years (or 30, depending on the copy of the Assyrian King List), (Note: Lines 27 to 28: [^{I}E-r]i-šu dumu ^{I}ilu-šum-ma [šá li-ma-ni]-šu-ni 40 mu^{meš} lugal^{ta} dù^{uš}.) followed by Ilu-shuma's other son, Ikunum. He titled himself "vice-regent of Assur, beloved of the god Ashur and the goddess Ishtar." The Synchronistic King List (Note: Synchronistic King List iv 17.) records, "eighty-two kings of Assyria from Erishum I, son of Ilu-shuma, to Ashurbanipal, son of Esarhaddon", in the concluding colophon.

== Biography ==
=== Hypothesized battle and trade deals ===
The Chronicle of Early Kings records his contemporary as Su-abu, who was once identified with the founder of the First Dynasty of Babylon, Sumu-abum, c. 1897 BC. (Note: Chronicle of Early Kings, BM 26472, 37.) The word "battles" (Note: Battles, gigam.didli.) is discernible on the subsequent, fragmentary line of the Chronicle, and this has led some historians to believe Ilu-shuma may have engaged in successful military conflicts with the fellow Akkadian speaking states of southern Mesopotamia. A brick inscription of Ilu-shuma describes his relations with the south and reads:

"The freedom (Note: Freedom = addurāru.) of the Akkadians and their children I established. I purified their copper. I established their freedom from the border of the marshes and Ur and Nippur, Awal, and Kismar, Der of the god Ishtaran, as far as Assur."

The historian M. Trolle Larsen has suggested that this may have represented an attempt to lure traders from the south of Assyria with tax privileges and exemptions, to monopolize the exchange of copper from the gulf for tin from the east. The cities cited therefore are the three major caravan routes the commodities would have traveled rather than campaign routes for the king.

=== Construction works and the memory of reigns ===
Ilu-shuma's construction activities included building the old temple of Ishtar, a city wall, subdivision of the city into house plots and diversion of the flow of two springs to the city gates Aushum and Wertum. Tukultī-Ninurta I recorded that he preceded him by 720 years, on his own inscriptions commemorating his construction of an adjacent Ishtar temple. From this it might be deduced that, despite later being among the "kings whose year names are not known", the reign length of Ilu-shuma was still known in the time of Tukulti-Ninurta I to be 21 years. Larsen has suggested that he may have been a contemporary of Iddin-Dagan and Ishme-Dagan of Isin, which would clash with the synchronization with Sumu-abum, but make more sense given the current chronology favored.

Preceded by Shalim-ahum	Išši’ak Aššur; 20th century BC	Succeeded by Erishum I

== See also ==
- Timeline of the Assyrian Empire
- Early Period of Assyria
- List of Assyrian kings
- Assyrian continuity
- Assyria
