= Shalim-ahum =

Ruler of the city-state of Assur in the 20th century BC

King of Assyria
- Reign: c. 2008 – c. 1991 BC
- Predecessor: Puzur-Ashur I
- Successor: Ilu-shuma
- Died: c. 1991 BC
- Issue: Ilu-shuma
- Father: Puzur-Ashur I

Shalim-ahum or Šalim-ahum (died c. 1991 BC) was a ruler of Assyria in the late 21st century to early 20th century BC. The Assyrian King List records his name as Šallim-aḫḫe, inscribed šal-lim-PAB^{MEŠ}, meaning, “keep the brothers safe”, and he appears among the six kings “whose eponyms are not found”, meaning that the length of his reign was unknown. He was described as the son of Puzur-Ashur I (dumu Puzu Assur) in his only known inscription. He is the earliest independent ruler to be attested in a contemporary inscription. Carved in curious archaic character mirror-writing in Old Assyrian on an alabaster block found during the German excavations at Assur under Walter Andrae, this sole exemplar of his contemporary inscriptions records that the god Ashur “requested of him” the construction of a temple and that he had “beer vats and storage area” built in the “temple area”.

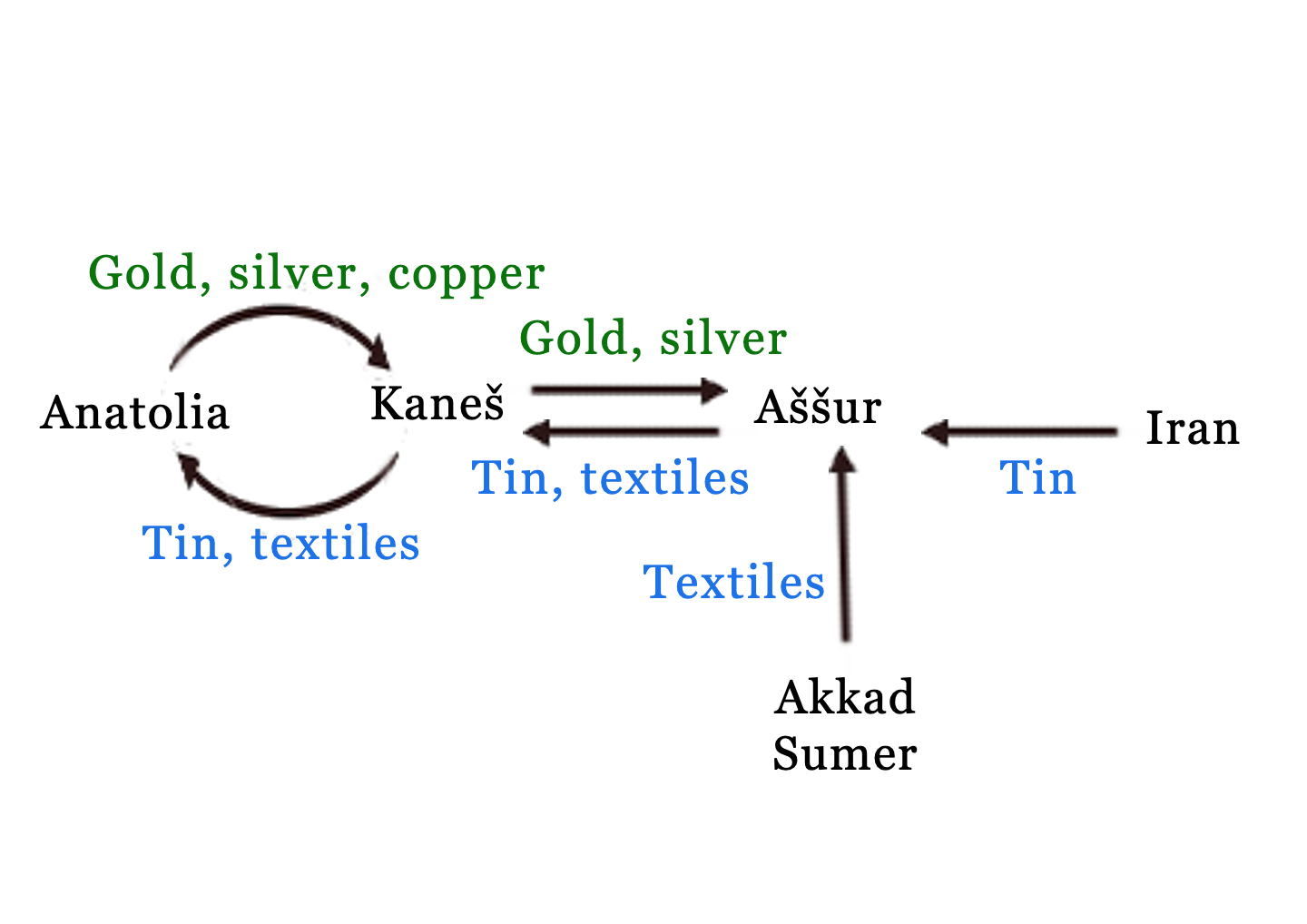
Karum trading patterns

He ruled during a period when nascent Assyrian merchant companies in karums were branching out into Anatolia to trade textiles and tin from Assur for silver. He was succeeded by his son, Ilu-shuma who died around 1974 BC, as recorded in his brick and limestone inscriptions and he appears in the genealogy of his grandson, Erishum I. His name appears in an inscription of Adad-nirari I and one of Shalmaneser I but only in the context of references to his son, Ilu-shuma. Shalim-ahum and his successors bore the title išši’ak Aššur, vice regent of Assur, as well as ensí.

Preceded by Puzur-Ashur I	King of Assyria c. 2008 – c. 1991 BC	Succeeded by Ilu-shuma
