= Matanchén =

Location in Nayarit, Mexico

Coordinates: 21°31′51″N 105°14′50″W

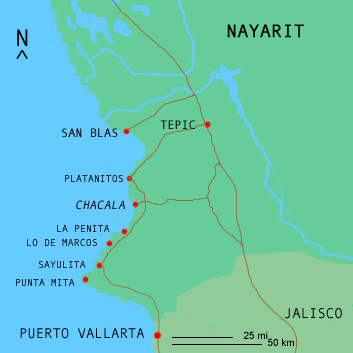

Matanchén is the name of both the bay and one of the small towns located just south of San Blas, Nayarit, on the Pacific coast of Mexico. It is known for its exceptionally long surf break. Las Islitas, one of the villages and surfing spots on Matanchén Bay, is documented by the Guinness Book of World Records as having the "World's Longest Surfable Wave" at 5,700 feet (1,700 m). A local surfer familiar with the conditions was quoted as saying "one quarter to half mile waves are not uncommon."

Matanchén is also the site of one of the earliest settlements in Western Mexico. The site dates to approximately 2000-2100 BCE.
