= Ikunum =

Ikunum 𒄿𒆪𒉡𒌝

King of Assyria
- Reign: c. 1935 – c. 1921 BC
- Predecessor: Erishum I
- Successor: Sargon I
- Died: c. 1921 BC
- Issue: Sargon I Ashur-imitti
- Father: Erishum I

Ikunum (Akkadian: 𒄿𒆪𒉡𒌝, romanized: I-ku-nu-um; died c. 1921 BC) was a king of Assyria c. 1935–1921 BC.

== Reign ==
He was the son and successor of Erishum I and the father of Sargon I. He built a temple for the god Ninkigal. He strengthened the fortifications of the city of Assur and maintained commercial colonies in Anatolia.

The following is a list of the 14 annually-elected limmu officials from the year of accession of Ikunum until the year of his death.

- 1934 BC: Buzi son of Adad-rabi
- 1933 BC: Šuli son of Šalmah
- 1932 BC: Iddin-Suen son of Šalmah
- 1931 BC: Ikunum son of Šudaya
- 1930 BC: Dan-Wer son of Ahu-ahi
- 1929 BC: Šu-Anum from Nerabtim
- 1928 BC: Il-massu son of Aššur-ṭab
- 1927 BC: Šu-Hubur son of Šuli
- 1926 BC: Idua son of Ṣulili
- 1925 BC: Laqip son of Puzur-Laba
- 1924 BC: Šu-Anum the hapirum
- 1923 BC: Uku son of Bila
- 1922 BC: Aššur-malik son of Panaka
- 1921 BC: Dan-Aššur son of Puzur-Wer

Ikunum was succeeded by his son, Sargon I. He had at least one more son, Ashur-imitti, mentioned in one of his inscriptions.

== Notes ==
Preceded by Erishum I	King of Assyria c. 1935 – c. 1921 BC	Succeeded by Sargon I
