= Erishum I =

20-century BC monarch of Assyria

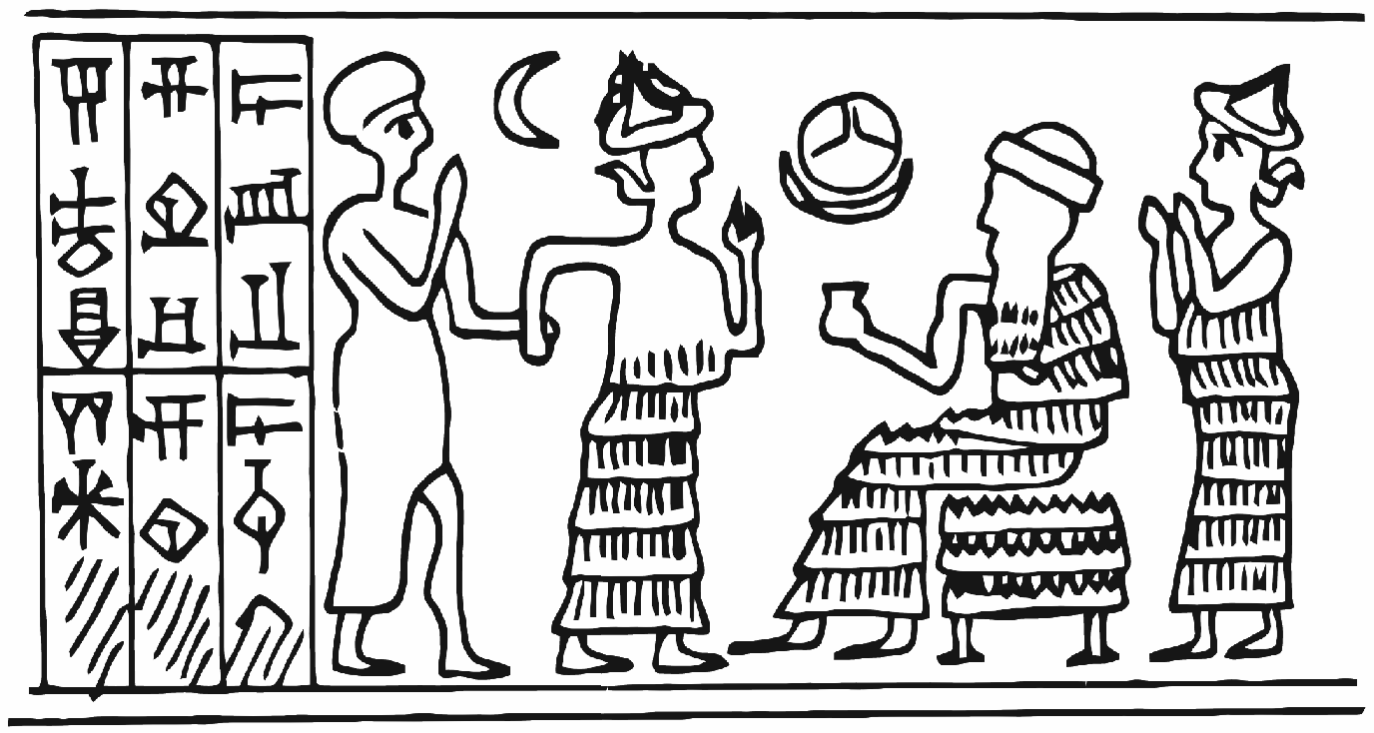
- Line-drawing of a seal of Erishum I from Kültepe. The seated figure is believed to be the god Ashur, with Erishum being the figure furthest to the left being led towards him.

King of Assyria
- Reign: c. 1974 – c. 1935 BC
- Predecessor: Ilu-shuma
- Successor: Ikunum
- Died: c. 1935 BC
- Issue: Ikunum
- Father: Ilu-shuma

Erishum I or Erišu(m) I (inscribed ^{m}e-ri-šu, or ^{m}APIN-ìš in later texts but always with an initial i in his own seal, inscriptions, and those of his immediate successors, “he has desired,”; died c. 1935 BC) (Note: Some historians quote ca. 1939–1900 BCE (after Amélie Kuhrt, The Ancient Near East, C. 3000-330 BCE, Volume 1 (Routledge, 1996), p. 82).) son of Ilu-shuma, was the 33rd ruler of Assyria to appear on the Assyrian King List. He reigned for around 40 years. (Note: Khorsabad kinglist.) One of two copies of the Assyrian King List (Note: SDAS Kinglist: [^{m}E-ri-š] u DUMU ^{m}DINGIR-šum-ma, [šá li-ma-ni? -šu-ni 10] + 30 MU.MEŠ LUGAL-ta DÙ-uš.) which include him gives his reign length as only 30 years, but this contrasts with a complete list of his limmu, some 40, which are extant from tablets (Note: KEL A (kt 92/k 193), at CDLI.) recovered at Karum Kanesh. He had titled himself both as, "Ashur is king, Erishum is vice-regent" (Note: ^{d}a-šùr LUGAL i-ri-šu-um PA.) and the, “Išši’ak Aššur”^{ki} (“steward of Assur”), at a time when Assur was controlled by an oligarchy of the patriarchs of the prominent families and subject to the “judgment of the city”, or dīn alim. According to Veenhof, Erishum I’s reign marks the period when the institution of the annually appointed limmu (eponym) was introduced. The Assyrian King List observes of his immediate predecessors, “in all six kings known from bricks, whose limmu have not been marked/found”.

== Biography ==
=== Trade and legal legacy ===
As Assur's merchant family firms vigorously pursued commercial expansion, Erišum I had established distant trading outposts in Anatolia referred to as karums. Karums were established along trade routes into Anatolia and included: Kanesh, Ankuwa, Hattusa, and 18 other locations that have yet to be identified, some of which had been designated as “warbatums” (satellites of and subordinate to the karums') The markets traded in: tin (inscribed AN.NA, Akkadian: annukum), textiles, lapis lazuli, iron, antimony, copper, bronze, wool, and grain, in exchange for gold and silver. Around 23,000 tablets have been found at Kanesh spanning a period of 129 years from the 30th year of Erishum I’s reign through to that of Puzur-Ashur II or possibly Naram-Sin with the earliest from level II including copies of his inscriptions. These were discovered in 1948 with three other similar though fragmentary lists and two copies of an inscription of Erishum I detailing the regulations concerning the administration of justice in Assur, including the possibility of plaintiffs to obtain a rābiṣum (attorney) to represent them:

The one who talks too much in the Step Gate, the demon of ruins will seize his mouth and his hindquarters; he will smash his head like a shattered pot; he will fall like a broken reed and water will flow from his mouth. The one who talks too much in the Step Gate, his house will become a house of ruin. He who rises to give false testimony, may the [Seven] Judges who decide legal cases in [the Step Gate, give a false] decision [against him]; [may Assur], Adad, and Bel, [my god, pluck his seed]; a place […] may they not give to him.

[The one who…] … obeys me, [when he goes] to the Step Gate, [may] the palace deputy [assist him]; [may he send] the witnesses and plaintiff (to the court); [may] the judges [take the bench] and give a proper decision [in Ašš]ur.

— Inscription of Êrišum I (Note: Tablet copies: An 201139 and An 20114.)

Following the example set by Erishum I's father (Ilu-shuma), he had proclaimed tax exemptions, or as Michael Hudson has interpreted, "Erishum I proclaimed a remission of debts payable in silver, gold, copper, tin, barley, wool, down to chaff." This appears in an inscription on one side of a large broken block of alabaster, (Note: BM 115689, Ass. 16850.) apparently described as a ṭuppu. The shallow depression on its top has led some to identify it as a door socket.

=== Construction works ===
His numerous contemporary inscriptions commemorate his building of the temple for Assur, called “Wild Bull” with its courtyard and two beer vats and the accompanying curses to those who would use them for their intended purposes. Erishum I’s other civic constructions included the temple of Ishtar and that of Adad. He had exercised eminent domain to clear an area from the Sheep Gate to the People’s Gate to make way for an enlargement of the city wall, so that he could boast that “I made a wall higher than the wall my father had constructed.” His efforts had been recalled by the later kings Šamši-Adad I, in his rebuilding dedication, and Šulmanu-ašared I, who noted that 159 years had passed between Erishum I’s work and that of Shamsh-Adad I, and a further 580 years until his own when a fire had gutted it.

== Limmu during Erishum I's reign ==
The following is a list of the annually-elected limmu from the first full year of Erishum I's reign until the year of his death c. 1935 BC (middle chronology):

1974 BC Šu-Ištar, son of Abila
1973 BC Šukutum, son of Išuhum
1972 BC Iddin-ilum, son of Kurub-Ištar
1971 BC Šu-Anim, son of Isalia
1970 BC Anah-ili, son of Kiki
1969 BC Suitaya, son of Ir'ibum
1968 BC Daya, son of Išuhum
1967 BC Ili-ellat
1966 BC Šamaš-t.ab
1965 BC Agusa
1964 BC Idnaya, son of Šudaya
1963 BC Quqadum, son of Buzu
1962 BC Puzur-Ištar, son of Bedaki
1961 BC Laqip, son of Bab-idi
1960 BC Šu-Laban, son of Kurub-Ištar
1959 BC Šu-Belum, son of Išuhum
1958 BC Nab-Suen, son of Šu-Ištar
1957 BC Hadaya, son of Elali
1956 BC Ennum-Aššur, son of Begaya
1955 BC Ikunum, son of Šudaya
1954 BC Is.mid-ili, son of Idida
1953 BC Buzutaya, son of Išuhum
1952 BC Šu-Ištar, son of Amaya
1951 BC Iddin-Aššur, son of the priest
1950 BC Puzur-Aššur, the ghee maker
1949 BC Quqadum, son of Buzu
1948 BC Ibni-Adad, son of Susaya
1947 BC Irišum, son of Adad-rabi
1946 BC Minanum, son of Begaya
1945 BC Iddin-Suen, son of Šalim-ahum
1944 BC Puzur-Aššur, son of Idnaya
1943 BC Šuli, son of Uphakum
1942 BC Laqip, son of Zukua
1941 BC Puzur-Ištar, son of Erisua
1940 BC Aguwa, son of Adad-rabi
1939 BC Šu-Suen, son of S.illia
1938 BC Ennum-Aššur, son of Begaya
1937 BC Enna-Suen, son of Pussanum
1936 BC Ennanum, son of Uphakum
1935 BC Buzi, son of Adad-rabi

== See also ==
- Timeline of the Assyrian Empire
- Old Assyrian Empire
- List of Assyrian kings
- Assyrian continuity
- Assyrian people

== Notes ==
Preceded by Ilu-shuma	King of Assyria c. 1974 – c. 1935 BC	Succeeded by Ikunum
