= 2011 Nigerian Senate elections in Katsina State =

2011 Nigerian Senate election in Katsina State

The 2011 Nigerian Senate election in Katsina State was held on April 9, 2011, to elect members of the Nigerian Senate to represent Katsina State. Abdul Yandoma representing Katsina North, Abu Ibrahim representing Katsina South and Ahmed Sani Stores representing Katsina Central all won on the platform of Congress for Progressive Change.

== Overview ==
Affiliation	Party		Total
Affiliation	CPC	PDP	Total
Before Election			3
After Election	3	–	3

== Summary ==
District	Incumbent	Party	Elected Senator	Party
Katsina North			Abdul Yandoma	CPC
Katsina South			Abu Ibrahim	CPC
Katsina Central			Ahmed Sani Stores	CPC

== Results ==
=== Katsina North ===
Congress for Progressive Change candidate Abdul Yandoma won the election, defeating other party candidates.

2011 Nigerian Senate election in Katsina State
Party	Candidate	Votes	%
CPC	Abdul Yandoma		
Total votes			
CPC hold			

=== Katsina South ===
Congress for Progressive Change candidate Abu Ibrahim won the election, defeating other party candidates.

2011 Nigerian Senate election in Katsina State
Party	Candidate	Votes	%
CPC	Abu Ibrahim		
Total votes			
CPC hold			

=== Katsina Central ===
CPC candidate Ahmed Sani Stores won the election, defeating party candidates.

2011 Nigerian Senate election in Katsina State
Party	Candidate	Votes	%
CPC	Ahmed Sani Stores		
Total votes			
CPC hold			
