= 1999 Nigerian Senate elections in Katsina State =

1999 Nigerian Senate election in Katsina State

The 1999 Nigerian Senate election in Katsina State was held on February 20, 1999, to elect members of the Nigerian Senate to represent Katsina State. Abdul Yandoma representing Katsina North, Samaʼila Mamman representing Katsina Central and Mohammed Tukur Liman representing Katsina South all won on the platform of the Peoples Democratic Party.

== Overview ==
Affiliation	Party		Total
Affiliation	PDP	AD	Total
Before Election			3
After Election	3	0	3

== Summary ==
District	Incumbent	Party	Elected Senator	Party
Katsina North			Abdul Yandoma	PDP
Katsina Central			Samaʼila Mamman	PDP
Katsina South			Mohammed Tukur Liman	PDP

== Results ==
=== Katsina North ===
The election was won by Abdul Yandoma of the Peoples Democratic Party.

1999 Nigerian Senate election in Katsina State
Party	Candidate	Votes	%
PDP	Abdul Yandoma		
Total votes			
PDP hold			

=== Katsina Central ===
The election was won by Samaʼila Mamman of the Peoples Democratic Party.

1999 Nigerian Senate election in Katsina State
Party	Candidate	Votes	%
PDP	Samaʼila Mamman		
Total votes			
PDP hold			

=== Katsina South ===
The election was won by Mohammed Tukur Liman of the Peoples Democratic Party.

1999 Nigerian Senate election in Katsina State
Party	Candidate	Votes	%
PDP	Mohammed Tukur Liman		
Total votes			
PDP hold			
