= Early Assyrian period =

Earliest period of Assyrian history

- c. 2600 BC–c. 2025 BC
- Location of Assur in modern Iraq
- Common languages: Akkadian, Sumerian and Hurrian
- Religion: Ancient Mesopotamian religion
- Historical era: Bronze Age
  - Earliest archaeological evidence from Assur: c. 2600 BC
  - Conquest by the Akkadian Empire: c. 2300 BC
  - Conquest by the Third Dynasty of Ur: c. 2100 BC
  - Independence under Puzur-Ashur I: c. 2025 BC
Preceded by	Succeeded by
Early Dynastic Period	Old Assyrian period
- Today part of: Iraq

The Early Assyrian period was the earliest stage of Assyrian history, preceding the Old Assyrian period and covering the history of the city of Assur and surrounding areas of Upper Mesopotamia, and its people and culture, prior to the foundation of Assyria as an independent city-state under Puzur-Ashur I c. 2025 BC. Very little material and textual evidence survives from this period. The earliest archaeological evidence at Assur dates to the Early Dynastic Period, c. 2600 BC, but the city may have been founded even earlier since the area had been inhabited for thousands of years prior and other nearby cities, such as Nineveh, are significantly older.

The archaeological evidence suggests that Assur was originally inhabited by Hurrians as well as Semites and was the site of a fertility cult devoted to the Assyrian goddess Ishtar. The name "Assur" is not historically attested prior to the age of the Akkadian Empire in the 24th century BC; it is possible that the city was originally named Baltil, used in later times to refer to its oldest portion. From approximately 3000 BC, centuries before the rise of the Akkadian Empire in the 24th Century BC, the Semitic-speaking ancestors of the Assyrians, Akkadians and Babylonians settled in Assur and throughout Mesopotamia, either displacing or assimilating earlier populations. Founded in a both holy and strategic location, the city itself was gradually deified during the Early Assyrian period and eventually became personified as the god Ashur, firmly established as the Assyrian national deity by the time of Puzur-Ashur I in the late 21st century BC.

There is no evidence so far discovered that Assur was independent at any point in the Early Assyrian period. Throughout the centuries prior to Puzur-Ashur I or Ushpia in the early 21st Century BC, it is instead evident that the city was dominated by a sequence of powerful states and empires from southern Mesopotamia. In the Early Dynastic Period, Assur and other Assyrian cities experienced considerable Sumerian influence, and for a time fell under the hegemony of the Sumerian city of Kish. In the 24th to 22nd centuries BC, the city was part of the Akkadian Empire as an administrative centre in northern Mesopotamia, a time later Akkadian speaking Assyrian kings saw as a golden age. In the final geopolitical stage preceding Assur's independence, the city became a peripheral city within the Sumerian empire of the Third Dynasty of Ur (c. 2112–2004 BC).

== History ==
=== Origins of Assur ===
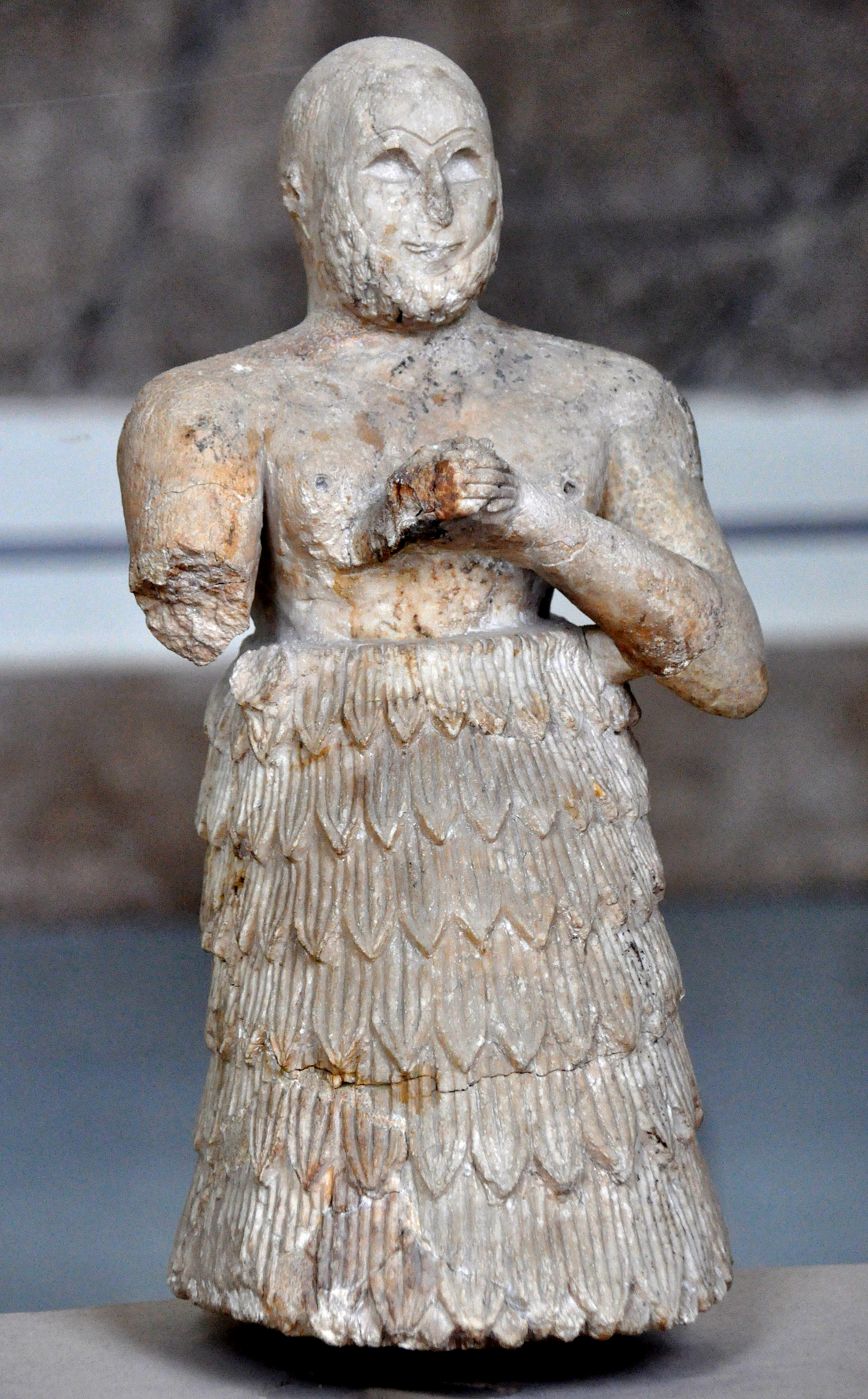
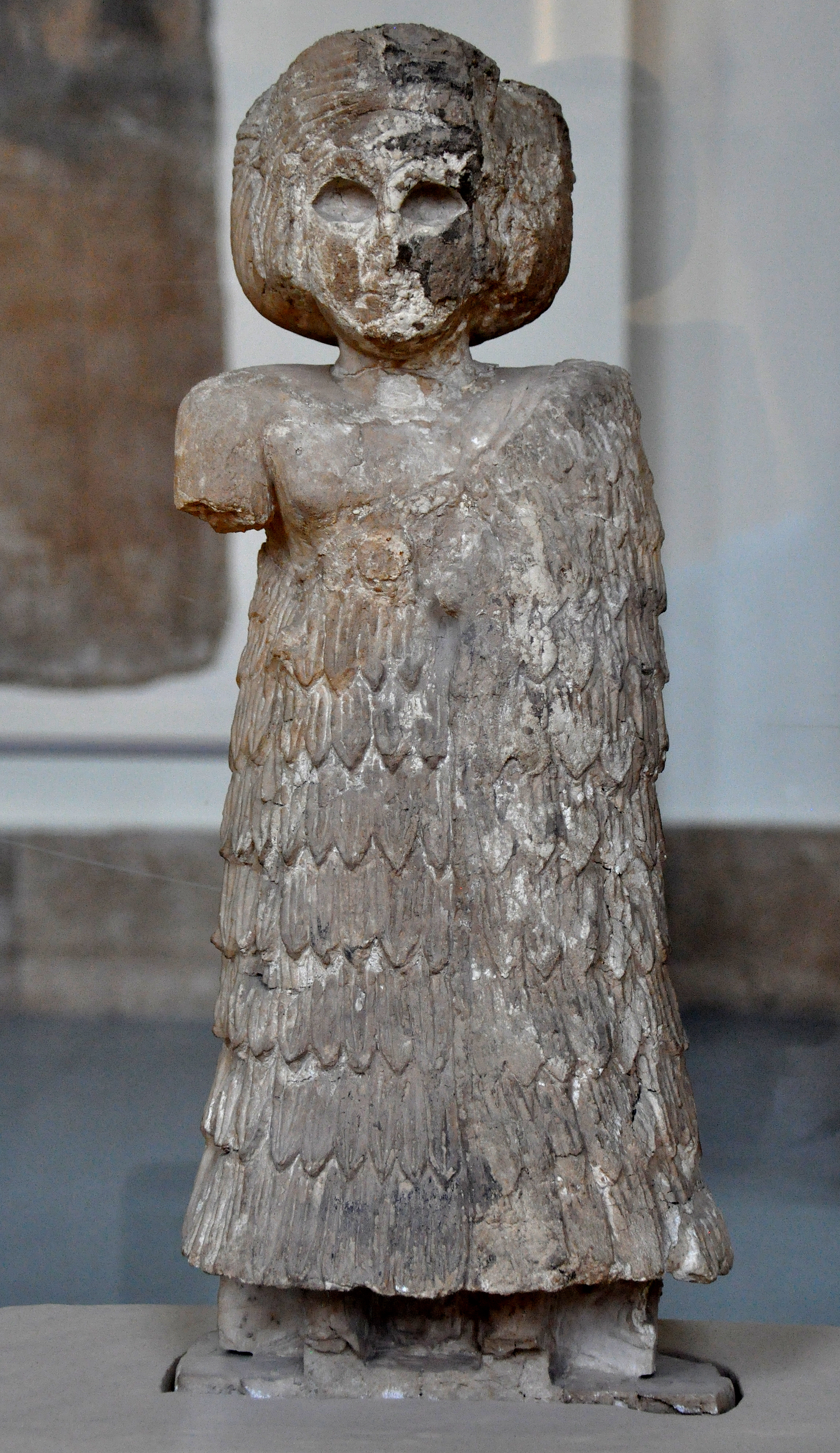
Statues of a praying man (left) and woman (right) recovered from the ruins of a temple dedicated to the goddess Ishtar in Assur in Assur, dating to the Early Dynastic Period circa 2400 BC, now in the Pergamon Museum

Agricultural villages in the region that would later become Assyria are known to have existed by the time of the Hassuna culture, c. 6300–5800 BC. The city of Assur was probably founded at some point in the Early Dynastic Period (c. 2900–2350 BC), or perhaps earlier, (Note: The nearby Nineveh is for instance known to have been inhabited millennia earlier, since the Neolithic period.) though there is no evidence of the city being an independent state prior to the time of Puzur-Ashur I, who ruled c. 2025 BC, although independent rule is credited in later Assyrian annals to have begun with Ushpia some sixty or so years earlier. The earliest archaeological evidence known from Assur predates the Akkadian Empire by only a few centuries, being from c. 2600 BC or c. 2500 BC. At this time, the surrounding region was already relatively urbanized, a development that might perhaps have resulted from being influenced by the heavily urbanized southern Mesopotamia. Archaeological evidence from the Early Dynastic Period is in general far more scarce in northern Mesopotamia, including around Assur, than in southern Mesopotamia. Much of the early historical remains of Assur may have been destroyed during the extensive construction projects of later Assyrian kings, who worked to create level foundations for the buildings they erected in the city. Very little concrete information is known about Assur in the early period, and most researchers do not treat the city as liable for much historical analysis until the Old Assyrian period, initiated by Puzur-Ashur I.

Early Assur was probably a local religious and tribal center, suggested by the early presence of temples at the site. The presence of monumental temples suggests that there was a town of some size surrounding the temples, and that the site was not just a small cult place. Assur was built in a highly strategic location; on a hill overlooking the Tigris river, protected by a river on one side and a canal on another. The region was however relatively arid, located just north of the artificially irrigated lands of southern Mesopotamia.

Later Assyrian kings used the name "Baltil" or "Baltila" to refer to the earliest portion of Assur, or perhaps to a preceding settlement in the same location. "Baltila" is a name of Hurrian origin, attested as a personal name among Hurrians near the city of Nuzi. According to a stele erected by the Neo-Babylonian king Nabonidus some two thousand years later, Baltila was the capital of the land of Subir. Subir, which also appears in the variants Subar and Subartu, is attested as a name for the land surrounding Assur, but the later Assyrians rarely used it. The reason for the name being dropped in later times appears to be that it took on a derogatory meaning: during the Old Babylonian Empire (c. 1894–1595 BC), so many slaves were imported from "Subartu" that "Subarian" in effect became a synonym for "slave".

=== Political history ===
During much of the early Assyrian period, Assur and Upper Mesopotamia was dominated by states and polities from southern Mesopotamia. The city was occupied by the Akkadian Empire and then the Third Dynasty of Ur. Prior to this, Assur had also for a time been one of the many Mesopotamian cities under the loose hegemony of the Sumerian city of Kish.

==== Under the Akkadian Empire ====
Approximate map of the Akkadian Empire under Naram-Sin (c. 2254–2218 BC). Assur was an important local administrative center in the north under the Akkadian kings.

The Akkadian Empire probably conquered Assur in the reign of its first ruler, Sargon (c. 2334–2279 BC), and is known to have controlled the city at least from the reign of Manishtushu (c. 2270–2255 BC) onwards, as contemporary inscriptions dedicated to Manishtushu have been recovered from the city. One inscription dedicated to Manishtushu was inscribed on the bronze point of a spear by Azazu, a local ruler of Assur who was the Akkadian king's vassal. Azazu's inscription was also dedicated to a deity, but the name, perhaps Ashur, is not clearly preserved. Texts of the Akkadian period from Nuzi illustrate that Assur was an important local outpost and administrative center under the Akkadian Empire, frequently staffed with Akkadian officials. A palace, similar to a palace built by the Akkadian king Naram-Sin at Tell Brak, was also constructed in the city.

The earliest inscription known from Assur, preceding that of Azazu, was made by the Išši'ak Aššur (governor of Assur) Ititi, son of a man called Ininlaba. Ititi was presumably also an Akkadian vassal. Both the Semitic names Ititi and Ininlaba are also attested in Nuzi. The Ititi attested at Nuzi, perhaps the same man as the Assyrian governor, was one of the ablest generals of Sargon of Akkad. In his inscription, Ititi dedicates the "booty" of Gasur (a city possibly identical with Nuzi) to the goddess Ishtar. That Ititi evidently raided Nuzi testifies to a somewhat lacking Akkadian central control in the region; had the Akkadian kings firmly and directly ruled both cities it is unlikely that they would have been able to raid each other. The period of Akkadian rule over Assur strongly influenced the culture of Assyria in the millennia thereafter. Whereas the Akkadian kings were later despised by the Babylonians in southern Mesopotamia as an affront to Babylon's god Marduk, the Assyrians remembered the period as a golden age and many later Assyrian kings later emulated the Akkadian rulers. Assyria's status as a prominent trading city, well-established in the later Old Assyrian period with trading colonies (Karums) as far north as Anatolia, may have begun under the Akkadian kings, as their conquests opened up new opportunities for trade.

There is archaeological and literary evidence that Assur's golden age under the Akkadian kings came to a violent end. The remains of temples from the early period at both Assur and Nineveh indicate that they were violently destroyed. According to the later Babylonian text Legend of Naram-Sin, a strange-looking army of the Lullubi invaded the northern parts of the Akkadian Empire before continuing southwards and eventually reaching Babylon itself, although at this time Babylon was only a small town. Archaeological evidence of Naram-Sin's palace at Tell Brak demonstrate that it was also sacked. According to the Assyriologist Hildegard Lewy, it can thus be assumed that the Lullubi did in fact invade Mesopotamia and sacked Assur at this time.

==== Under the Third Dynasty of Ur ====
Approximate map of the territory of the Third Dynasty of Ur under Shulgi (c. 2094–2046 BC). Assur was a peripheral city in this empire.

Assur was restored at some point after its destruction by the Lullubi. The Akkadian Empire collapsed in the early 22nd century BC, probably due to rebellions in southern Mesopotamia and the invasions from the eastern Gutians. What impact the collapse of the empire had on Assur cannot be determined from the surviving evidence, but other sources indicate that much of Mesopotamia again fractured into small city-states, perhaps including Assur itself.

Within a century of the Akkadian Empire's collapse, southern Mesopotamia was reunited by the Sumerian Third Dynasty of Ur (c. 2112–2004 BC). The rulers of Ur were not as concerned about northern Mesopotamia as the Akkadians had been, but they did conduct campaigns and conquests in the region and established control over Assur. Unlike the south, which they ruled directly, peripheral cities such as Assur were placed under the rule of local governors. The military administration of governors ensured loyalty and tribute. In the ruins of one of Assur's temples, dedicated to Ishtar, an inscription written by the Assyrian governor (šakkanakkum) Zariqum states that he founded a new temple in the city, dedicated to the goddess Bēlat-ekallim (i.e. Ninegal), for the life of Amar-Sin (c. 2046–2037 BC), king of Ur. (Note: It has also been suggested that Zariqum was an independent ruler, who only recognized the overlordship of the Ur III kings, but this is a minority view.)

The period of Sumerian dominance of Assur came to an end as the last king of the Third Dynasty of Ur, Ibbi-Sin (c. 2028–2004 BC) lost his administrative grip on the peripheral regions of his empire and Assur became an independent city-state under its own rulers, beginning with Ushpia c. 2090 BC.

=== Early names in the Assyrian King List ===
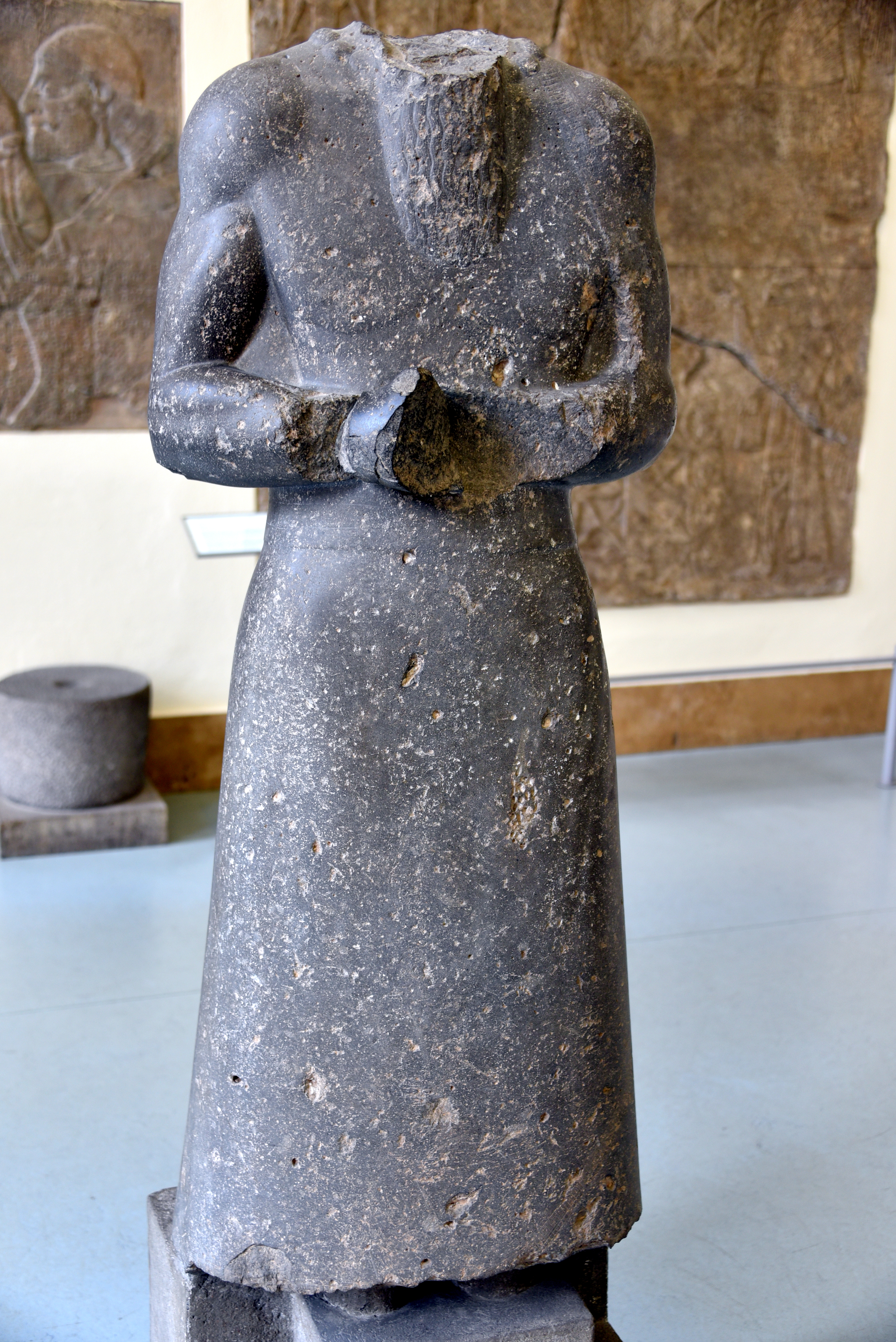
Beheaded statue of a ruler of the Akkadian period discovered at Assur. Believed to depict either the king Manishtushu or the local governor Ititi.

Though there is no evidence of independent Assyrian rule during the early period, the Assyrian King List, a much later document listing the sequence of Assyrian rulers, lists 29 kings prior to Puzur-Ashur, unverified by contemporary sources. At least portions of this sequence is likely entirely invented, as many of the names of the earliest rulers rhyme (suggesting an invented pattern), and the names do not match the names of known governors of Assur under the Akkadian and Neo-Sumerian empires. Perhaps the sequence was invented in an attempt to create a legitimate "prehistory" by one of the later Assyrian kings. Given that the earliest rulers are described as "kings who lived in tents", they, if real, may not have ruled Assur at all but rather have been tribal chieftains somewhere in its vicinity who eventually seized the throne. This nomadic origin fits poorly with the archaeological record from Assur and neighboring sites, which instead indicates intense agriculture and early urbanization. As in the Sumerian King List, several names, if real, may also have belonged to rulers who were contemporaries/rivals, rather than successors and predecessors of one another.

Lewy speculated that the "kings who lived in tents" were not kings at all, but the contemporary ancestors of the different tribes that eventually became the Assyrian people, similar to the Twelve Tribes of Israel. Other researchers, such as Klaas Veenhof and Jesper Eidem, have dismissed the early names in the king list as a mixture of Amorite tribal-geographical names with no relation to Assur at all. The "kings who lived in tents" are succeeded in the king list by the "kings who were ancestors", a sequence of names typically interpreted as either the ancestors of the later king Shamshi-Adad I (c. 1808–1776 BC), inserted into the king list in an effort to create dynastic legitimacy (though they then did not actually rule Assur), or as a general set of legendary Amorite ancestors (Shamshi-Adad was an Amorite and a similar sequence of names appear in a text describing the ancestors of the Amorite dynasty of Babylon). The "kings who were ancestors" are thus not generally believed to be closely connected to Assur. The last three names mentioned in the list prior to Puzur-Ashur I; Sulili, Kikkia and Akiya, could perhaps be genuine historical rulers of Assur, but their existence is not corroborated by other sources (Note: It has been suggested that Sulili could be identified with Silulu, an early period ruler (presumably governor under the Akkadians or Sumerians) of Assur, but the name is spelt differently and Silulu's inscription names his father as Dakiki whereas the Assyrian King List names Sulili's father as Aminu.) and fitting them in chronologically between Puzur-Ashur I and the Ur III kings is problematic.

The only names among the early names on the king list that are mentioned in later ancient sources outside of the list is Ushpia, the 17th name mentioned, and Kikkia, the 28th name. Ushpia is stated in the inscriptions of the significantly later Assyrian kings Shalmaneser I (c. 1273–1244 BC) and Esarhaddon (681–669 BC) to have been the original builder of the temple dedicated to Ashur in Assur, and thus in effect the founder of the city itself. Although it is possible that Shalmaneser I got Ushpia's name from oral tradition or from inscriptions that no longer survive, it is also strange that the name of the supposed founder, if he was real, of the city and its first temples does not appear in known inscriptions until about a millennium later. Kikkia is mentioned in the inscriptions of Ashur-rim-nisheshu (c. 1408–1401 BC) and Shalmaneser III (859–824 BC) as the supposed first builder of a wall around Assur.

== Archaeological evidence ==
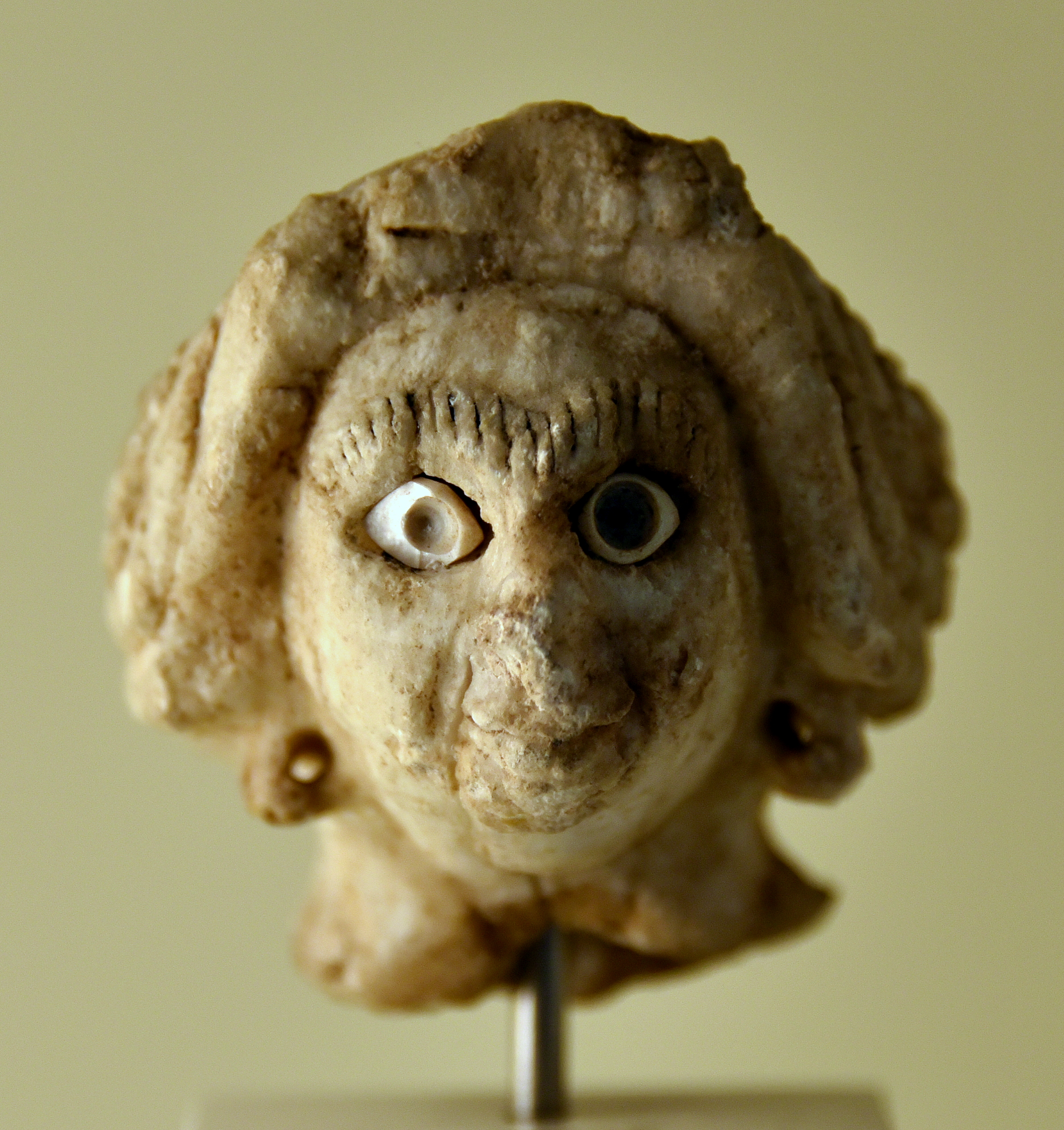
Head of a female figure, dating to the Akkadian period, found at Assur

There is very little surviving evidence of what type of settlement Assur was in the early period. Among the scant archaeological evidence recovered of early Assur are the remains of two temples built in mudbrick, both dedicated to the goddess Ishtar. Dubbed Ishtar H and G by modern researchers, the earlier one (H) has left almost no trace other than the lower stumps of its walls and can confidently be dated to the Early Dynastic Period as nothing has been found below it (indicating it was among the earliest structures at the site) and because some of the walls of the later temple (G) are directly above it. Ishtar G was composed of an oblong cella, an antechamber and a niche at its far end, perhaps designed to contain a cult statue. The structure of the less well-preserved Ishtar H was probably similar. The architecture of the temples is suggestive of the ED II (c. 2750/2700–2600 BC) and ED III (c. 2600–2350 BC) periods. Both temples appear to have been destroyed by being burnt down.

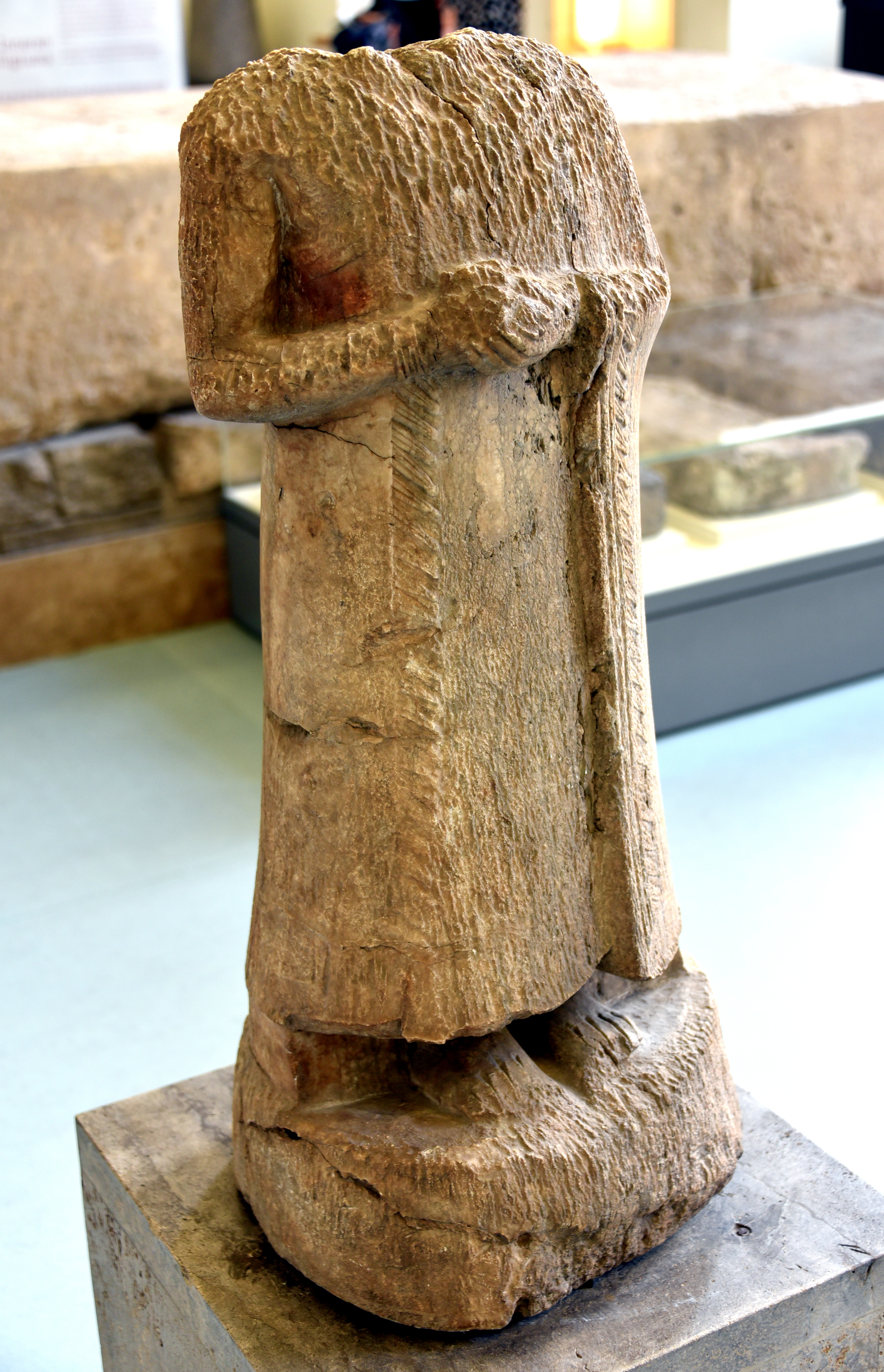
Statue from Assur in the Ur III period, possibly depicting the governor Zariqum

Also recovered in conjunction with these temples were 87 alabaster figures of worshippers, ranging in height from 20 to 65 centimeters (8 to 26 inches), depicting both men and women. The style of these figures resembles Sumerian figures of the ED II and ED III periods. One of the early figures found at Assur is a head of a female figure, wearing a fillet. This head is typical of the art style of the Akkadian period, with smooth and soft curves and a full mouth. As it was found in association with the Ishtar G temple, it indicates that the temple continued to be used well into the Akkadian period as well. In addition to the alabaster figures of worshippers, also recovered were 24 stone statues of naked women, five statues of animals, a number of incense burners/pot stands and three large clay altars or house models. A unique figure among the recovered finds was an ivory figurine of a nude woman, alongside fragments of at least five additional similar figurines. The ivory used might have come from Indian elephants, which would indicate trade between Assur and the early tribes and states of Iran. Also found among the artefacts of Ishtar G are a clay bottle with the features of a nude woman as well as a figurine of a man with an erect penis.

In addition to the figures and the architecture, other archaeological finds, including pottery and a vase, from early Assur also demonstrate strong Sumerian influence. Found in one of the temples was also a fragment of a bedstead which depicts a woman lying down, wearing a choker, earrings and several rings with exposed breasts; the typical style associated with a deceased Sumerian noblewoman who was to be buried.

== Society ==
=== Population and culture ===
It is impossible to confidently determine the ethnic composition of Upper Mesopotamia and Assur's early population based only on material evidence but it is unlikely to have been homogenous. The population of Assur and much of Upper Mesopotamia in the early period was likely mostly tribal and would have predominantly spoken a Semitic language, likely Akkadian from a relative early point in time. As suggested by the historical evidence concerning Baltil and Subartu, the site of Assur and the surrounding lands were probably originally or also inhabited by Hurrians, who were either assimilated or displaced at some point when the Semitic-speaking ancestors of the later Assyrians settled the region. If they were driven out, the Hurrians of Assur and the surrounding region might then have migrated to the Zagros mountains in the east, where Hurrians are firmly historically attested in later periods. According to the Assyriologist Georges Roux, many of the early names in the Assyrian King List, such as Tudiya, Ushpia, Sulili and Kikkia, are not Semitic or Akkadian in origin, but could perhaps be Hurrian, although this is a disputed view.

The strong Sumerian influence seen in the Ishtar H and G temples might suggest that there was not only Sumerian influence in Assur during this time, but perhaps that the site was for a time in its early history inhabited by a group of Sumerians alongside the local Semites, or possibly even that it was conquered by some unknown Sumerian ruler.

=== Religion ===
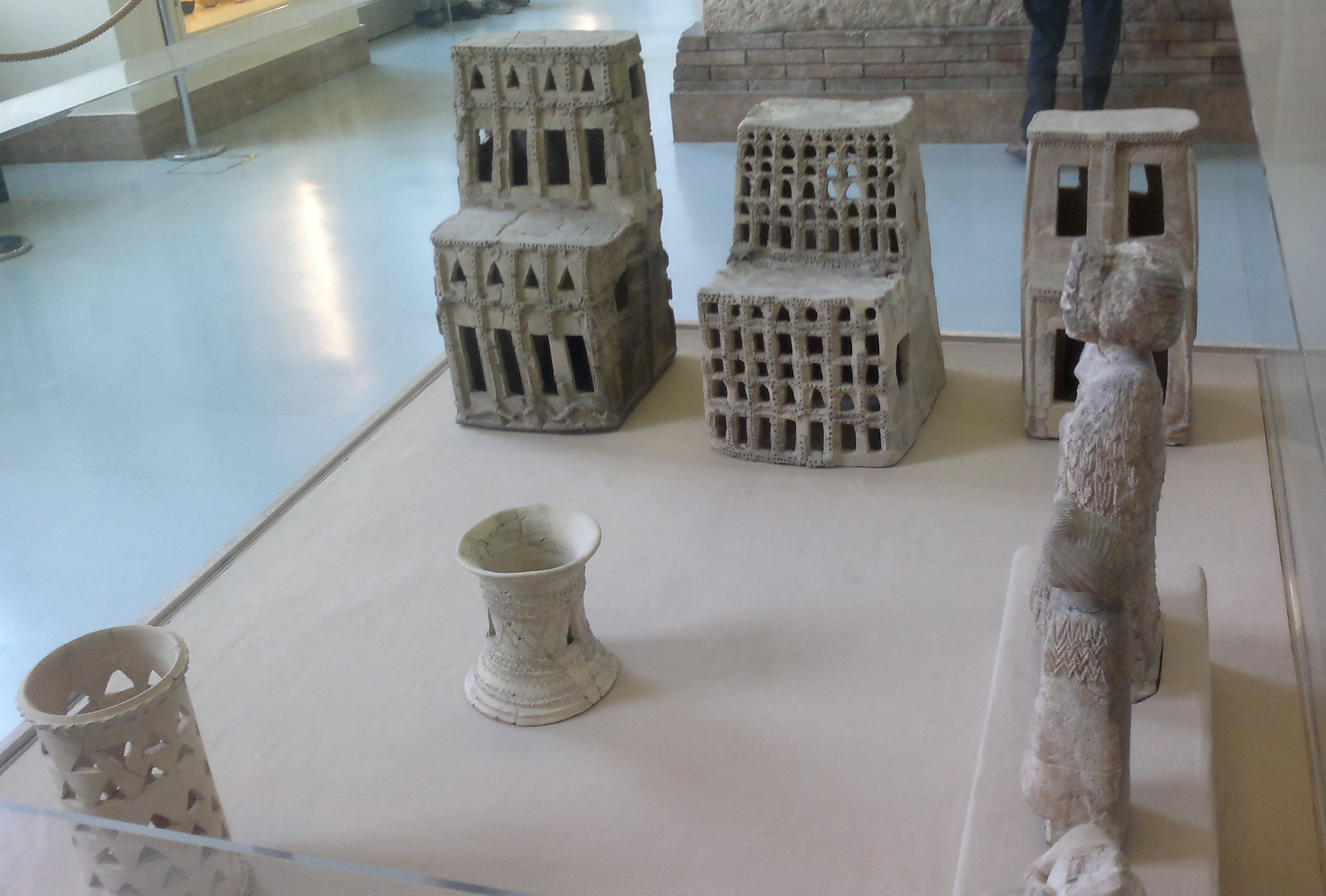
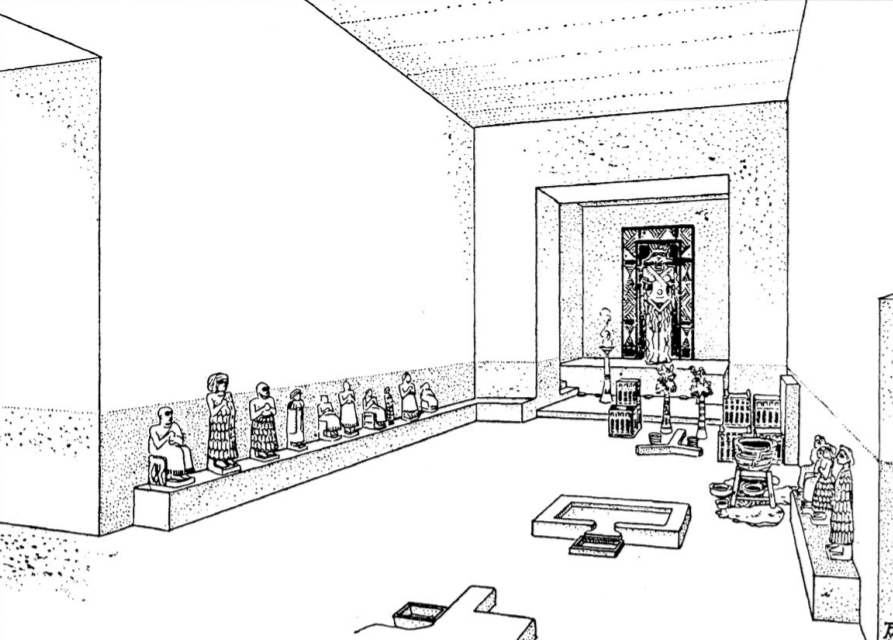
Some of the artefacts recovered from the Ishtar G temple, dating to the Early Dynastic Period (left) and a reconstruction of the interior of the temple (right)

Assyrian religion was a part of Mesopotamian religion. The earliest temples in Assur being devoted to Ishtar, combined with the number of nude female figurines found in the Ishtar H and G temples, suggests that Assur in the early period was preoccupied with a fertility cult. Ishtar, although a Sumero-Akkadian deity, was also a principal deity among the early Hurrian inhabitants of Nuzi, and in other cities in the vicinity. The fertility cult and devotion to Ishtar did not diminish with Assur's incorporation into the Akkadian Empire, as Ishtar was Akkad's patron deity and was thus held in high regard by the Akkadian rulers. From the time of the Akkadian period onwards, there was also much religious reverence for the moon and its associated god, Sîn, a practice continued in later Assyrian periods and inspired by the lunar devotion of the Akkadian kings. Not all practices of the Akkadian kings were seen as good by the populations of Assur. In particular, there appears to have been objections to the practice of the Akkadian kings to add statues of themselves to the temples (normally reserved only for statues of deities); an Akkadian statue in the temple dedicated to Ishtar in Assur shows evidence of deliberately being beheaded.

Although worship of Ashur, the Assyrian national deity, is well-attested in the Old Assyrian period, there is no concrete evidence of worship of Ashur from the early period. The texts from the Akkadian period that explicitly name the city as Assur are the first indirect references to Ashur, since the god shares the city's name. Though they are commonly distinguished by modern historians through calling the god Ashur and the city Assur, both were inscribed in the exact same way in ancient times (Aššur). Because Old Assyrian documents sometimes appear to not differentiate between the city and the god, it is believed that Ashur is a deified personification of the city itself. Perhaps the site of the city, originating as a holy site prior to the city's construction and settled due to its strategic location came to gradually be regarded as divine in its own right at some point in the early period. Assyrians of later periods linked Ashur to Ishtar and though it was never expressly stated, they were sometimes mentioned together in inscriptions as if they were husband and wife. Ashur's role as a deity was flexible and changed with the changing culture and politics of the Assyrians themselves. Though he would in later centuries be regarded as a god of war, guiding the Assyrian kings on their campaigns, he was in Old Assyrian (and presumably also late Early Assyrian) times seen as a god of death and revival, related to agriculture. Though it was no longer Ashur's main function in later periods, his agricultural role continued to remain prominent. One of Ashur's main associated symbols as late as the Neo-Assyrian Empire was the "Tree of Life", which represented the revival of life every spring. As such, he still retained his status as a god of death and revival.

== See also ==
- History of Mesopotamia
- Old Assyrian period
- Middle Assyrian Empire
- Neo-Assyrian Empire
- Assyrian people
- Achaemenid Assyria
- Athura
- Asoristan
- Assyrian continuity
- Ancient Mesopotamian religion
- List of Mesopotamian dynasties
