= 2003 Nigerian Senate elections in Katsina State =

2003 Nigerian Senate election in Katsina State

The 2003 Nigerian Senate election in Katsina State was held on April 12, 2003, to elect members of the Nigerian Senate to represent Katsina State. Mahmud Kanti Bello representing Katsina North and Abu Ibrahim representing Katsina South won on the platform of All Nigeria Peoples Party, while Umar Ibrahim Tsauri representing Katsina Central won on the platform of the Peoples Democratic Party.

== Overview ==
Affiliation	Party		Total
Affiliation	PDP	ANPP	Total
Before Election			3
After Election	1	2	3

== Summary ==
District	Incumbent	Party	Elected Senator	Party
Katsina North			Mahmud Kanti Bello	ANPP
Katsina South			Abu Ibrahim	ANPP
Katsina Central			Umar Ibrahim Tsauri	PDP

== Results ==
=== Katsina North ===
The election was won by Mahmud Kanti Bello of the All Nigeria Peoples Party.

2003 Nigerian Senate election in Katsina State
Party	Candidate	Votes	%
ANPP	Mahmud Kanti Bello		
Total votes			
ANPP hold			

=== Katsina South ===
The election was won by Abu Ibrahim of the All Nigeria Peoples Party.

2003 Nigerian Senate election in Katsina State
Party	Candidate	Votes	%
ANPP	Abu Ibrahim		
Total votes			
ANPP hold			

=== Katsina Central ===
The election was won by Umar Ibrahim Tsauri of the Peoples Democratic Party.

2003 Nigerian Senate election in Katsina State
Party	Candidate	Votes	%
PDP	Umar Ibrahim Tsauri		
Total votes			
PDP hold			
