= 2015 Nigerian Senate elections in Katsina State =

2015 Nigerian Senate election in Katsina State

The 2015 Nigerian Senate election in Katsina State was held on March 28, 2015, to elect members of the Nigerian Senate to represent Katsina State. Mustapha Bukar representing Katsina North, Abu Ibrahim representing Katsina South and Kurfi Umaru representing Katsina Central all won on the platform of All Progressives Congress.

== Overview ==
Affiliation	Party		Total
Affiliation	APC	PDP	Total
Before Election			3
After Election	3	–	3

== Summary ==
District	Incumbent	Party	Elected Senator	Party
Katsina North			Mustapha Bukar	APC
Katsina South			Abu Ibrahim	APC
Katsina Central			Kurfi Umaru	APC

== Results ==
=== Katsina North ===
All Progressives Congress candidate Mustapha Bukar won the election, defeating People's Democratic Party candidate Yau Umar Gojo and other party candidates.

2015 Nigerian Senate election in Katsina State
Party	Candidate	Votes	%
APC	Mustapha Bukar		
PDP	Yau Umar Gojo		
Total votes			
APC hold			

=== Katsina South ===
All Progressives Congress candidate Abu Ibrahim won the election, defeating People's Democratic Party candidate Abdulahi Faskari and other party candidates.

2015 Nigerian Senate election in Katsina State
Party	Candidate	Votes	%
APC	Abu Ibrahim		
PDP	Abdulahi Faskari		
Total votes			
APC hold			

=== Katsina Central ===
All Progressives Congress candidate Kurfi Umaru won the election, defeating People's Democratic Party candidate Lamis Shehu and other party candidates.

2015 Nigerian Senate election in Katsina State
Party	Candidate	Votes	%
APC	Kurfi Umaru		
PDP	Lamis Shehu		
Total votes			
APC hold			
