= 1992 Nigerian Senate elections in Katsina State =

1992 Nigerian Senate election in Katsina State

The 1992 Nigerian Senate election in Katsina State was held on July 4, 1992, to elect members of the Nigerian Senate to represent Katsina State. Mahmud Kanti Bello representing Katsina North and Ibrahim Safana representing Katsina Central won on the platform of Social Democratic Party, while Abu Ibrahim representing Katsina South (Funtua) won on the platform of the National Republican Convention.

== Overview ==
Affiliation	Party		Total
Affiliation	SDP	NRC	Total
Before Election			3
After Election	2	1	3

== Summary ==
District	Incumbent	Party	Elected Senator	Party
Katsina North			Mahmud Kanti Bello	SDP
Katsina Central			Ibrahim Safana	SDP
Katsina South (Funtua)			Abu Ibrahim	NRC

== Results ==
=== Katsina North ===
The election was won by Mahmud Kanti Bello of the Social Democratic Party.

1992 Nigerian Senate election in Katsina State
Party	Candidate	Votes	%
SDP	Mahmud Kanti Bello		
Total votes			
SDP hold			

=== Katsina Central ===
The election was won by Ibrahim Safana of the Social Democratic Party.

1992 Nigerian Senate election in Katsina State
Party	Candidate	Votes	%
SDP	Ibrahim Safana		
Total votes			
SDP hold			

=== Katsina South (Funtua) ===
The election was won by Abu Ibrahim of the National Republican Convention.

1992 Nigerian Senate election in Katsina State
Party	Candidate	Votes	%
NRC	Abu Ibrahim		
Total votes			
NRC hold			
