= Nigerian National Assembly delegation from Katsina =

Katsina's delegation in Nigeria's National Assembly

The Nigerian National Assembly delegation from Katsina comprises three Senators representing Katsina South, Katsina Central, and Katsina North, and fifteen Representatives representing Kaita/Jibia, Malum Fashi/Kafur, Daura/Sandamu/Mai'Adua, Funtua/Dandume, Dutsin-ma/Kurfi, Mashi/Dutsi, Mani/Bindawa, Bakori/Danja, Kankia/Ingawa/Kusada, Safana/Batsari/Dan-Musa, Musawa/Matazu, Rimi/Charanchi/Batagarawa, Baure/Zango, Kankara/Sabuwa/Faskari, and Katsina Central.

== Nigerian Fourth Republic|Fourth Republic ==
=== The 4th Parliament (1999–2019) ===
Office	Name	Party	Constituency
Senator	Mohammed Tukur Liman	PDP	Katsina South
Senator	Samaʼila Mamman	PDP	Katsina Central
Senator	Abdu Yandoma	PDP	Katsina North
Representative	Abdullahi Musa Nuhu	PDP	Kaita/Jibia
Representative	Aminu Bello Masari	PDP	Malum Fashi/Kafur
Representative	Daura Adamu Saidu	PDP	Daura/Sandamu/Mai'Adua
Representative	Funtua Lawal Ibrahim	PDP	Funtua/Dandume
Representative	Makera Sabiu Hassan	PDP	Dutsin-ma/Kurfi
Representative	Mashi Abdu Haro	PDP	Mashi/Dvisi
Representative	Musa Aliyu	PDP	Mani/Bindawa
Representative	Nadabo Tukur Idris	PDP	Bakori/Danja
Representative	Nasarawa Usman Mani	PDP	Kankia/Ingawa/Kusada
Representative	Safana Amina Yakubu	PDP	Safana/Batsari/Dan-Musa
Representative	Shehu Abubakar Garba	PDP	Musawa/Matazu
Representative	Tsagero Muazu Lemamu	PDP	Rimi/Charanchi/Batagarawa
Representative	Yahaya Shuaib Baure	PDP	Baure/Zango
Representative	Yankara Lawal Yusufu	PDP	Kankara/Sabuwa/Faskari
Representative	Yar'adua Abubakar Sadiq	PDP	Katsina Central
Representative	Abubakar Lamido Sadiq	PDP	Katsina North Central
