= 2007 Nigerian Senate elections in Katsina State =

2007 Nigerian Senate election in Katsina State

The 2007 Nigerian Senate election in Katsina State was held on April 21, 2007, to elect members of the Nigerian Senate to represent Katsina State. Ibrahim M. Ida representing Katsina Central, Mahmud Kanti Bello representing Katsina North and Garba Yakubu Lado representing Katsina South all won on the platform of the Peoples Democratic Party.

== Overview ==
Affiliation	Party		Total
Affiliation	PDP	AC	Total
Before Election			3
After Election	3	0	3

== Summary ==
District	Incumbent	Party	Elected Senator	Party
Katsina Central			Ibrahim M. Ida	PDP
Katsina North			Mahmud Kanti Bello	PDP
Katsina South			Garba Yakubu Lado	PDP

== Results ==
=== Katsina Central ===
The election was won by Ibrahim M. Ida of the Peoples Democratic Party.

2007 Nigerian Senate election in Katsina State
Party	Candidate	Votes	%
PDP	Ibrahim M. Ida		
Total votes			
PDP hold			

=== Katsina North ===
The election was won by Mahmud Kanti Bello of the Peoples Democratic Party.

2007 Nigerian Senate election in Katsina State
Party	Candidate	Votes	%
PDP	Mahmud Kanti Bello		
Total votes			
PDP hold			

=== Katsina South ===
The election was won by Garba Yakubu Lado of the Peoples Democratic Party.

2007 Nigerian Senate election in Katsina State
Party	Candidate	Votes	%
PDP	Garba Yakubu Lado		
Total votes			
PDP hold			
