= 2007 Katsina State gubernatorial election =

2007 gubernatorial election in Katsina State, Nigeria

- 14 April 2007
Nominee	Ibrahim Shema	Abu Ibrahim
Party	PDP	ANPP
Running mate	Surajo Umar Damari
Popular vote	1,185,489	218,302
Governor before election
Umaru Musa Yar'Adua
PDP
Elected Governor
Ibrahim Shema
PDP

The 2007 Katsina State gubernatorial election occurred on 14 April 2007. PDP candidate Ibrahim Shema won the election, defeating ANPP Abu Ibrahim and other candidates.

== Results ==
Ibrahim Shema from the PDP won the election. He defeated Abu Ibrahim of the ANPP and others.

The total number of registered voters in the state was 2,589,047.

- Ibrahim Shema, (PDP)- 1,185,489
- Abu Ibrahim, ANPP- 218,302
- Usman Bugaje, ACN- 54,449
- Sani Abu- 3,442
