= Steel industry in Nigeria =

Overview of the iron and steel industry of Nigeria

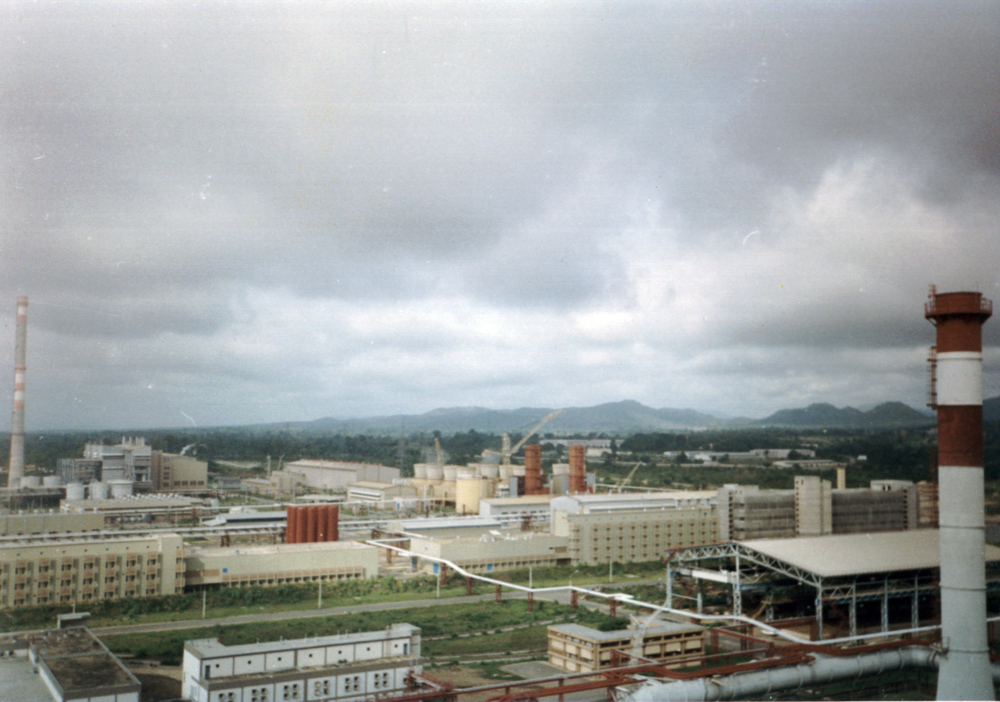
Ajaokuta Steel Mill

Iron and steel industry in Nigeria developed as a public funded integral industry. Between 1979 and 1983, Nigeria government jump started iron and steel production with emphasis on the importance of iron and steel in developing and driving local production of goods. A strong iron and steel industry was also projected to reduce demand of foreign currency used towards the importation of steel products.

== History ==
The iron and steel industry in Nigeria started by government intervention through the construction of various steel rolling mills. After iron ore deposits were discovered in old Kwara State in the 1950s, the Nigerian First Republic government began active planning and mapping of strategies for local production of iron rods and steel. However, many proposals presented by foreign companies were less enthused on steel production due to concerns about local technical know how and market demand. But in 1967, a technical group from the Soviet Union proposed the use of direct blast furnace process as a viable method of production in the country. Further exploration of iron ore deposits by Soviet firm Technopromexport yielded commercial quantities around the Itakpe region of present Kogi State. In 1971, a Nigeria steel development authority was created to design plans for iron and steel projects and train students in iron and steel making.

In 1979, the Nigerian government signed an agreement with soviet group Technopromexport for the construction of a steel plant in Ajaokuta.

Steel making infrastructure reached an advanced stage in 1982 with the commissioning of Aladja Steel complex, the first phase was built at a total cost of 922 million naira. The factory's process utilized electric arc furnace steel making technology. The mill was planned to produce finished billets more than it could process into wire or iron rods. The remainder of the billets were distributed to three rolling mills in Jos, Osogbo, Katsina, these mills then produced rods between 6mm and 40mm. The production capacity of the rollings mills were divided into phases, the first phase with an estimated hourly production of 80 tonnes of finished products was 210,000 tonnes per year, a second phase projected a production rate of 420,000 tonnes per year and a final phase production of 720,000 tonnes per year

=== Katsina rolling mills ===
Katsina rolling mills was constructed by Kobe Steel of Japan. One of the Nigerian project coordinators was Mahmud Kanti Bello who later became a senator of the Federal Republic of Nigeria. Upon completion, the country agreed to a 36 months technical assistance programme with Kobe to train Nigerian employees. The mill produced plain and ribbed rods between 6mm to 40mm in diameter and the finished products were primarily associated with wire industries.

=== Jos steel rolling mill ===
The rolling mill in Jos was constructed by a consortium of German firms; Mannesmann Demag, AEG Telefunken, Ofenbau Union and Bilfinger + Berger.

=== Osogbo steel rolling mill ===
The mill was commissioned on April 30, 1983. The construction phase was handled by a consortium of Eisenbau Essen, Schloemann Siemag, Strabag and MFB Ferrostal. The government and the builders signed a technical assistance programme to train workers who will later takeover daily operations of the mill. The steel mill complex also had housing facilities for select worker within the complex.
