= Akiya (Assyrian king) =

21st-century BC monarch of Assyria

Akiya 𒀀𒆠𒅀

Possible King of Assur
- Reign: c. 2050 BC
- Successor: Possibly Puzur-Ashur I

Akiya (Akkadian: 𒀀𒆠𒅀, romanized: A-ki-ia; fl. c. 2050 BC) was according to the Assyrian King List (AKL) the 29th Assyrian monarch, ruling in Assyria's early period. He is listed within a section of the AKL as the third out of the six, "kings whose eponyms are not known." As all the other early rulers listed in the king list and unattested elsewhere, there is dispute among scholars as to whether Akiya was a real historical figure.

== See also ==
- Timeline of the Assyrian Empire
- Early Period of Assyria
- List of Assyrian kings
- Assyrian people

Preceded by	Possible King of Assur c. 2050 BC	Succeeded by Possibly Puzur-Ashur I
