= Zariqum =

Head of city in Assur

King of Assur
- Reign: c. 2045 BC

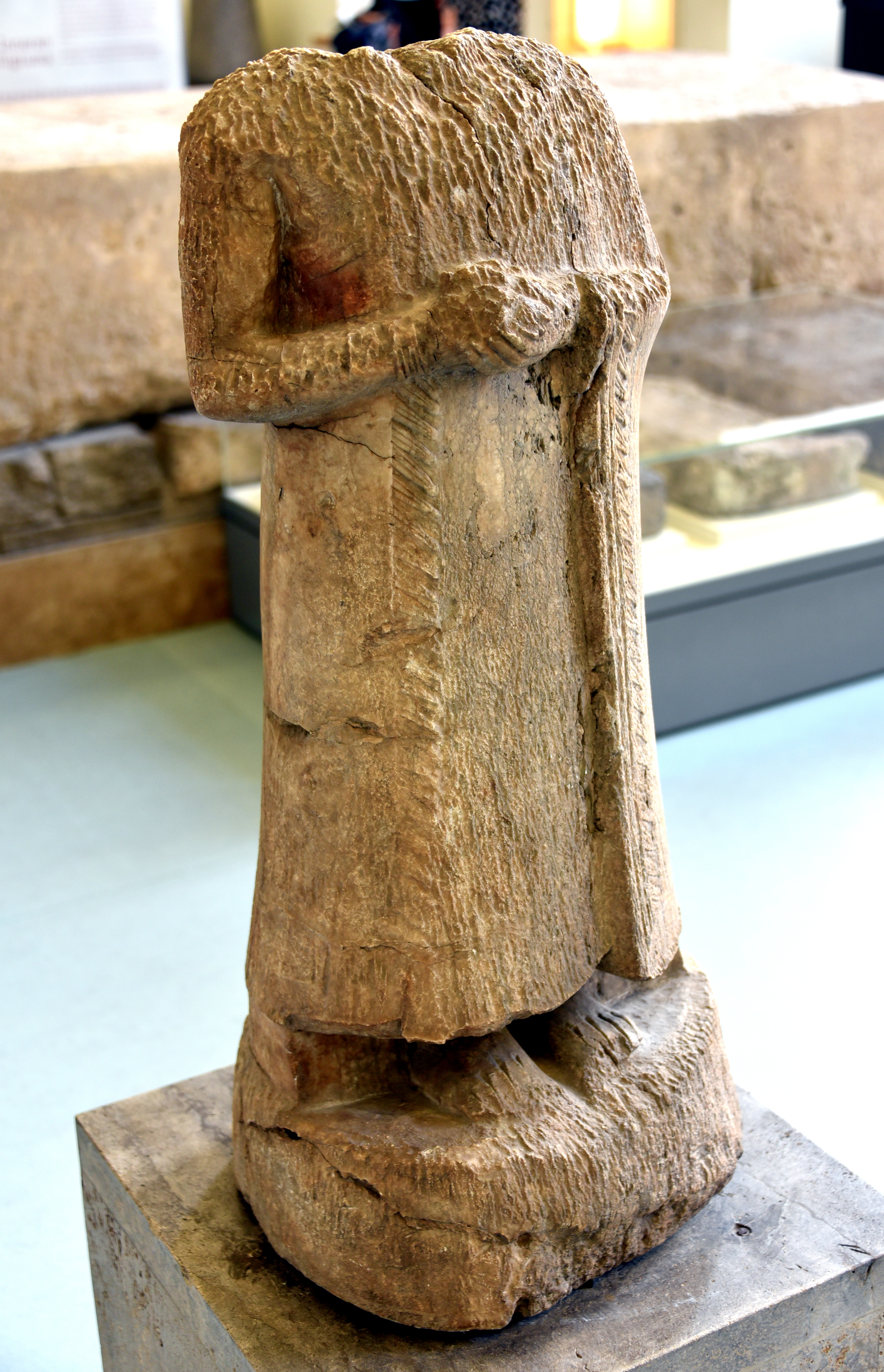
A statue from the Ur III period recovered from Assur, possibly depicting Zariqum

Zariqum or Zarriqum was a Sumerian governor (šakkanakkum; fl. c. 2045 BC) of the city of Assur under the Third Dynasty of Ur, attested there between the 44th year of Shulgi (c. 2050 BC) and the 5th year of Amar-Sin (c. 2041 BC).

He is the only governor of the city during this time, otherwise poorly known from surviving sources, to be known by name. Though he has also been suggested to have been an independent ruler, this is a minority view, as Assur is not generally regarded to have been independent before the time of Puzur-Ashur I, c. 2025 BC. Under Ur, Assur is generally believed to have formed the northernmost peripheral province. In the ruins of one of the city's temples, dedicated to the goddess Ishtar, an inscription by Zariqum states that he founded a new temple in the city, dedicated to the goddess Bēlat-ekallim (i.e. Ninegal), for the life of Amar-Sin, king of Ur.

Zariqum was previously believed to have had a long and wide-spanning career, also having been a military officer and a governor of Susa in Elam, due to the name Zariqum also being attested for contemporary individuals with those positions. Since the Zariqum who governed Susa governed simultaneously with the time Zariqum is attested as the governor of Assur, they cannot be the same person and must instead simply have been contemporary individuals with the same name.
