= Aminu Safana =

Nigerian politician (1961–2007)

Aminu Shuaibu Safana (April 1961 – October 17, 2007) was a Nigerian politician who represented the Batsari/Safana/Danmusa constituency of Katsina State in the House of Representatives.

A doctor by training, Safana was a graduate of Ahmadu Bello University and the Universities of Leeds and London. He had been a confidant of President Umaru Yar'Adua, and had served as secretary of Katsina State's government while Yar'Adua was governor.

He was elected to the House of Representatives in 2003, and was reelected in 2007. He was a People's Democratic Party member and chairman of the house's Committee on Health. On October 17, 2007, Safana collapsed on the assembly's floor; he was pronounced dead the same day at the Abuja National Hospital, the cause of death being identified as a heart attack.
