= Aminu =

Aminu is a Hausa language name. It is a variation of "Amin", an Arabic name. Aminu means trustworthy. Amin means true-hearted, honest. People who share this name include:

== Given name ==
- Aminu Dantata (1931–2025), Nigerian oil industry executive and banker
- Aminu Sule Garo (born 1962), Nigerian politician and businessman
- Aminu Kano (1920–1983), Nigerian politician
- Aminu Isa Kontagora (1956–2021), Nigerian military Administrator and governor
- Aminu Bello Masari (born 1950), Governor of Katsina State since 2015
- Aminu Mohammed (born 1993), Ghanaian footballer
- Aminu Mohammed (basketball) (born 2001), Nigerian basketball player
- Aminu Safana (1961–2007), Nigerian politician
- Aminu Saleh (1933–2015), Nigerian administrator, former Finance Minister, and permanent secretary in the Nigerian ministry of Defense
- Aminu Sani (born 1980), Nigerian footballer who plays midfielder
- Aminu Tambuwal (born 1966), Governor of Sokoto State since 2015

== Surname ==
- Abdulkareem Baba Aminu (born 1977), Nigerian journalist and artist
- Abdulmumini Aminu (born 1949), Nigerian politician best known as military governor of Borno State, Nigeria between August 1985 and December 1987
- Al-Farouq Aminu (born 1990), American-Nigerian basketball player, brother of Alade Aminu
- Alade Aminu (born 1987), American-Nigerian basketball player, brother of Al-Farouq Aminu, 2015–16 Israel Basketball Premier League rebounding leader
- Jibril Aminu (1939–2025), Nigerian cardiologist and politician
- Mohammed Aminu (born 2000), Ghanaian footballer

== See also ==
- Mallam Aminu Kano International Airport, an airport in Kano, Kano State, Nigeria
