= National Hospital, Abuja =

Coordinates: 9.0400°N 7.4623°E

National Hospital Abuja
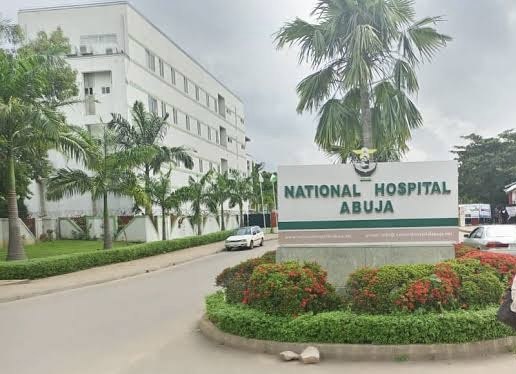

Geography
- Location: Abuja, FCT, Nigeria

Organisation
- Care system: Public
- Type: District General

Services
- Emergency department: Yes
- Beds: 850

History
- Founded: 22 May 1999

Links
- Lists: Hospitals in Nigeria

National Hospital Abuja is a public hospital in Abuja, FCT, Nigeria.

== History ==
National Hospital Abuja was founded under the Family Support Programme initiative and was formally established under Decree 36 of 1999 (Act 36 of 1999). Abdulsalami Abubakar commissioned the hospital on 22 May 1999. Originally National Hospital For Women And Children, the hospital opened on 1 September 1999. The hospital received its current name on 10 May 2000.

== Director Board ==
- Rt. Hon. Olubunmi P. Etteh CFR –Chairperson
- Prof Muhammad Raji Mahmud – Chief Medical Director. Appointed as CMD in 2023 by president Buhari over the acting Chief Medical Director issue in the hospital.
- Mene A. Sunny
- Dr Victor Amuta
- Bakura Shettima
- Isa Bawa Adamu
- Dr Chris Osa Isokpunwu
- Prof. Edward O. Ogirima, mni
- Prof. Olufemi Ogunrinde
- Prof. Oluwarotimi Ireti Akinola
- Mrs. Jumoke Smith
- Mrs. Elizabeth Egharevba
- Dr Abba Badamasi Kankarofi -Director Clinical Services/CMAC
- Engr. Olusegun Shokunbi – Ag Director Maintenance
- Danjuma Hassan Maaruf – Director Finance and Accounts
- Dr. Peter Egwakhide PhD. – Director Admin/ Board Secretary.

== Departments and Services ==
- Radiotherapy And Oncology
- Paediatrics
- Dental And MFU
- Anaesthesia Intensive Care
- Family Medicine
- Medical Physics
- Obstetrics & Gynaecology
- Ophthalmology
- Otorhinolaryngology/Head And Neck Surgery
- Physiotherapy
- Radiology
- Surgery
- Internal Medicine
- Nursing Services
- Plastic Surgery Unit
- Medical Microbiology
- Medical Record
- Psychiatry
- Haematology
- National Trauma Centre NHA
- Dietetics
- Pharmacy
- Chemical Pathology
- Histopathology
- Invitro Fertilization (IVF)
- Health Records
- Library Services
- Nuclear Medicine

== Incident ==
On the 18th of May there was a fire outbreak in the oncology department of the hospital which leads to emergency evacuation of patients.

== Notable patients ==
- Mohammed Abacha
- Evan Enwerem
- Aminu Safana
- Zach.ji (Nollywood Actor)
