= Ibrahim M. Ida =

Nigerian politician (born 1949)

Senator for Katsina Central
- In office 29 May 2007 – May 2011
- Preceded by: Umar Ibrahim Tsauri
- Succeeded by: Ahmed Sani Stores

Personal details
- Born: 15 January 1949 (age 77) Katsina State, Nigeria
- Party: Apc

Ibrahim M. Ida (born 15 January 1949) was elected Senator for Katsina Central constituency of Katsina State, Nigeria, taking office on 29 May 2007. He is a member of the All Progressives Congress.

== Career ==
Ida obtained an AIB, London (1977), an MSc in Banking & Finance, University of Ibadan (1983) and an LLB, BL, University of Abuja (2003). Before being elected to the Senate he was Commissioner of Finance, Katsina State and Permanent Secretary, Federal Civil Service. After election, he was appointed to committees on Rules & Business, Independent National Electoral Commission, Finance and Defence & Army. Vice chancellor Umaru Musa Yaradua University Katsina.

Ibrahim Ida was appointed by President Bola Ahmed Tinubu on 30 March 2026 as Chairman of the Corporate Affairs Commission Board.
