= Ahmed Sani Stores =

Nigerian politician

Senator for Katsina Central
- In office May 2011 – December 2011
- Preceded by: Ibrahim M. Ida
- Succeeded by: Abubakar Sadiq Yar'adua
- In office November 2013 – May 2015
- Preceded by: Abubakar Sadiq Yar'adua
- Succeeded by: Kurfi Umaru

Personal details
- Born: Katsina, Nigeria
- Party: Congress for Progressive Change (CPC)

Ahmed Sani Stores is a Nigerian politician who was elected as Senator for Katsina Central, in Katsina State, in the 9 April 2011 national elections. He was elected on the Congress for Progressive Change (CPC) ticket.

Ahmed Sani Stores was born in Kangiwa ward in Katsina city. He was educated at North East Worcestershire College, Bromsgrove, London, and became a financial and export consultant. He has experience in Solar and Wind power generation. While based in London, in 2003 he was one of the founders of the Foundation for Good Governance and Development in Nigeria.

Stores returned to Nigeria to compete in the Senatorial election. It was reported that at one point during the campaign Ahmed Sani Stores was taken to a magistrates court and charged for perpetrating violence. In the 9 April 2011 election, Ahmed Sani Store defeated Ibrahim M. Ida of the People's Democratic Party (PDP) with 267,154 votes to Ida's 188,205.
