= Amar-Sin =

Sumerian king, 21st-century BC

Amar-Sin 𒀭𒀫𒀭𒂗𒍪
- King of Sumer and Akkad; King of the Four Corners of the World
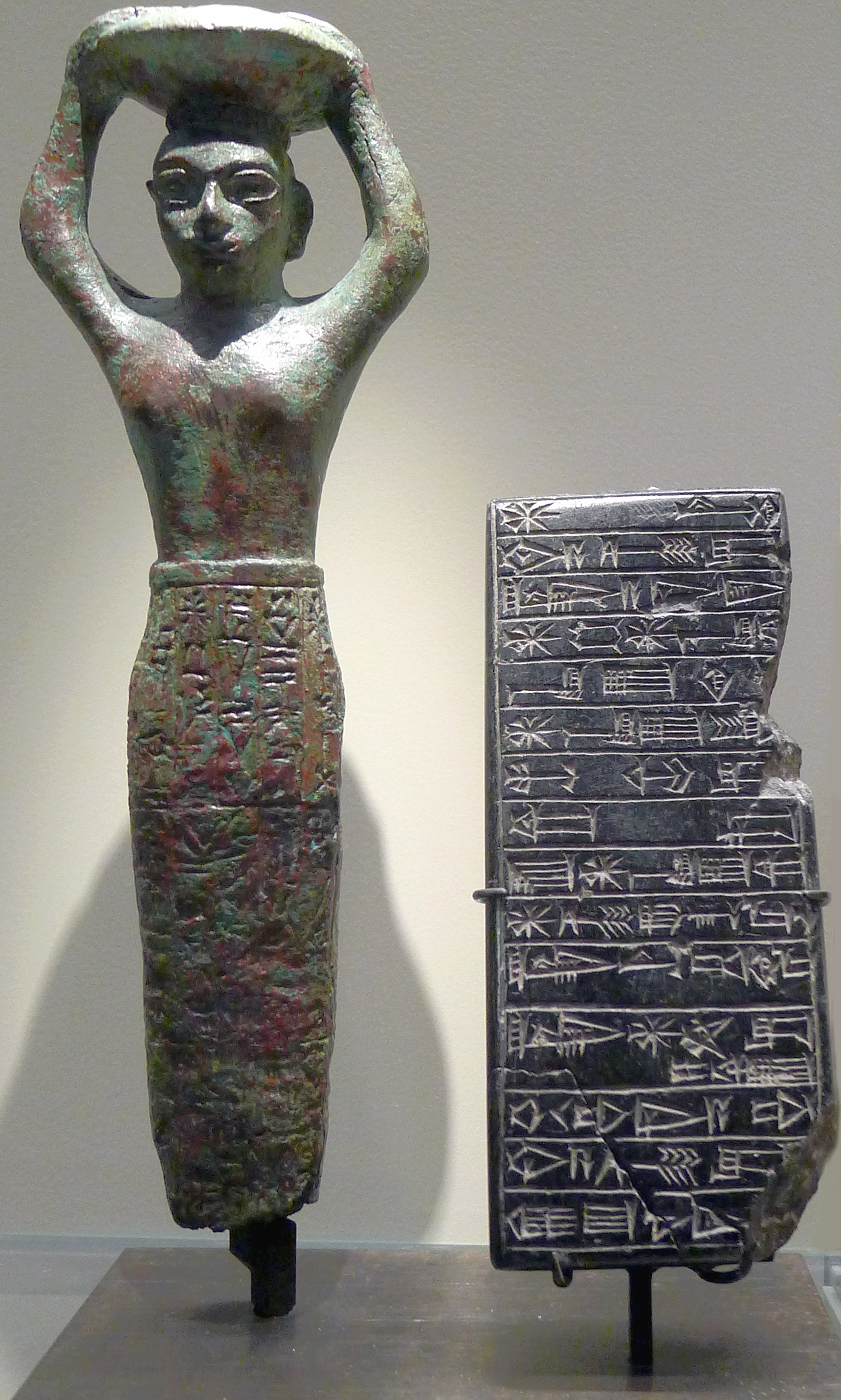
- An architectural foundation-nail figurine depicting king Amar-Sin himself carrying the builder's wicker traybasket, and a cuneiform dedication tablet of Amar-Sin

King of Ur
- Reign: 9 regnal years c. 2046 – c. 2037 BC
- Predecessor: Shulgi
- Successor: Shu-Sin
- Died: c. 2037 BC
- Dynasty: 3rd Dynasty of Ur

Amar-Sin (Akkadian: 𒀭𒀫𒀭𒂗𒍪: ^{D}Amar^{D}Sîn, "calf of Sîn", the "𒀭" being a silent honorific for "Divine"; died c. 2037 BC) initially misread as Bur-Sin (c. 2046–2037 BC middle chronology), was the third ruler of the Third Dynasty of Ur. He succeeded Shulgi, who might have been his father. His name translates to 'bull calf of the moon-god'. The name Amar-Sin was not recorded before his ascension and is a "throne name". His original name, and whether he was actually the son of Shulgi, is unknown. It has been proposed that Amar-Sin, Shu-Sin, and Ibbi-Sin were all brothers and sons of Shulgi. Alternatively, it has been suggested that Amar-Sin was a nephew of Shulgi, explaining his difficulties at the beginning and ending of his reign.

== Reign ==
Year-names are known for all nine years of his reign. These record campaigns conducted against Urbilum, and several other regions with obscure names: Shashrum, Shurudhum, Bitum-Rabium, Jabru, and Huhnuri. Amar-Sin is otherwise known to have campaigned against Elamite rulers such as Arwilukpi of Marhashi, and Ur under his reign extended as far as the northern provinces of Lullubi and Hamazi, with their own governors. He also ruled over Assur through the Akkadian governor Zariqum, as confirmed by his monumental inscription. (Note: Zariqum does not appear on the Assyrian King List tablets, but is usually placed by archaeologists between Akkiya and Puzur-Ashur I. He is well known from contemporary documents as a career governor who was also appointed over Susa at various times between Shulgi year 40 and Shu-Sin year 4.)

Amar-Sin's reign is notable for his attempt at regenerating the ancient sites of Sumer. He apparently worked on the unfinished ziggurat at Eridu.

The Babylonian Weidner Chronicle records the following: "Amar-Sin ... changed the offerings of large oxen and sheep of the Akitu festival in Esagila. It was foretold that he would die from goring by an ox, but he died from the [scorpion?] 'bite' of his shoe."

=== Attempted Coup ===
The administrative documentation from Amar-Sin's reign suggests that in his final years, he was confronted with some internal strife, and it is likely that Shu-Sin was behind an effort to ovethrow him. The imperial guard, the agà-ús, were replaced in Amar-Sin's seventh year with a unit called the gàr-du, often the gàr-du of Amar-Sin. This unit disappears from the record in his ninth year shortly after his death. Also in his seventh year, the king hosted military officials from throughout the empire at a banquet in Ur, where they were required to swear an oath of loyalty. Cylinder seals bearing dedications to the king Shu-Sin appear towards the end of Amar-Suen's reign, but certainly before his death. The provincial governors also see some unusual transitions during this time, including being ousted during the middle of Amar-Sin's reign, only to return to their post after his death. Taken together, it seems likely that Shu-Sin attempted to take power during his brother's reign. It is unclear if Amar-Sin was assassinated during this period, or if he died of natural causes.

== Attestation ==
=== Year names of Amar-Sin ===
All the year names of Amar-Sin are known, and, as was standard for the time, documented events during that king's reign. While some events are military conquests, most of Amar-Sin's years record cultic activities. Some examples include:

1a. Year: "Amar-Suen is king"
1b. Year: "Harshi and Kimaš were destroyed"
2a. Year: "Amar-Suen, the king, destroyed Urbilum"
5a. Year: "Enunugalanna was installed as en-priest of Inanna in Uruk"
6b. Year: "Amar-Suen, the king, destroyed Shashrum for the second time and Shurudhum"
7b: Year: "Amar-Suen, the king, destroyed Bitum-rabium, Jabru, their territories and Huhnuri"

— Some year names of Amar-Sin.

=== Artifacts ===
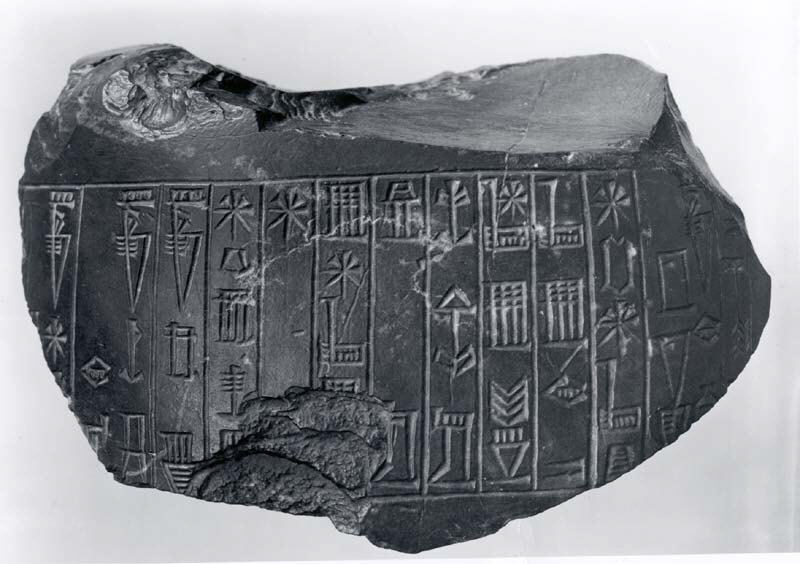
Statue fragment bearing incised cuneiform inscription of Amar-Sin, c. 2046–2038 BC. Neo-Sumerian.

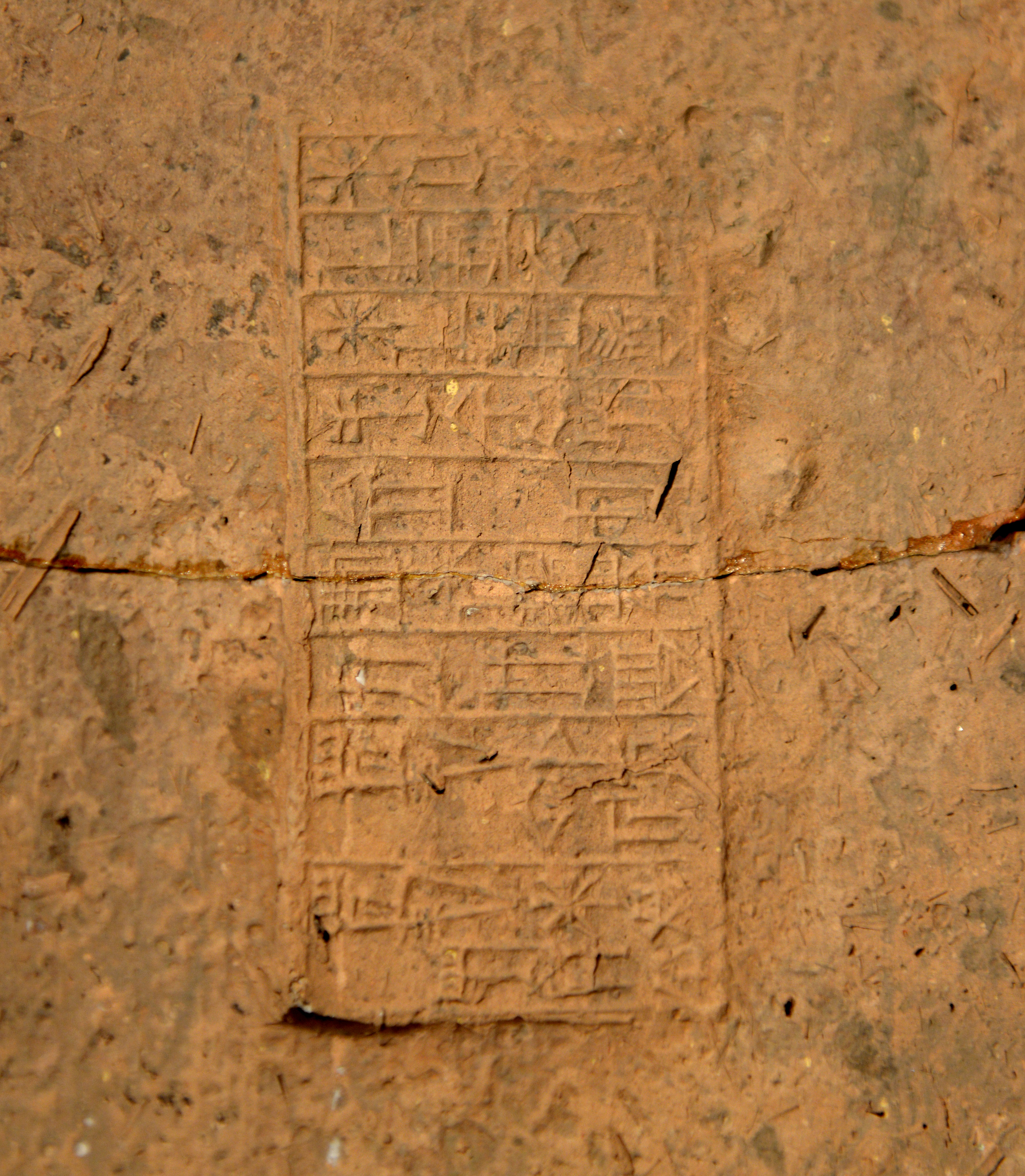
Stamped mud-brick of Amar-Sin

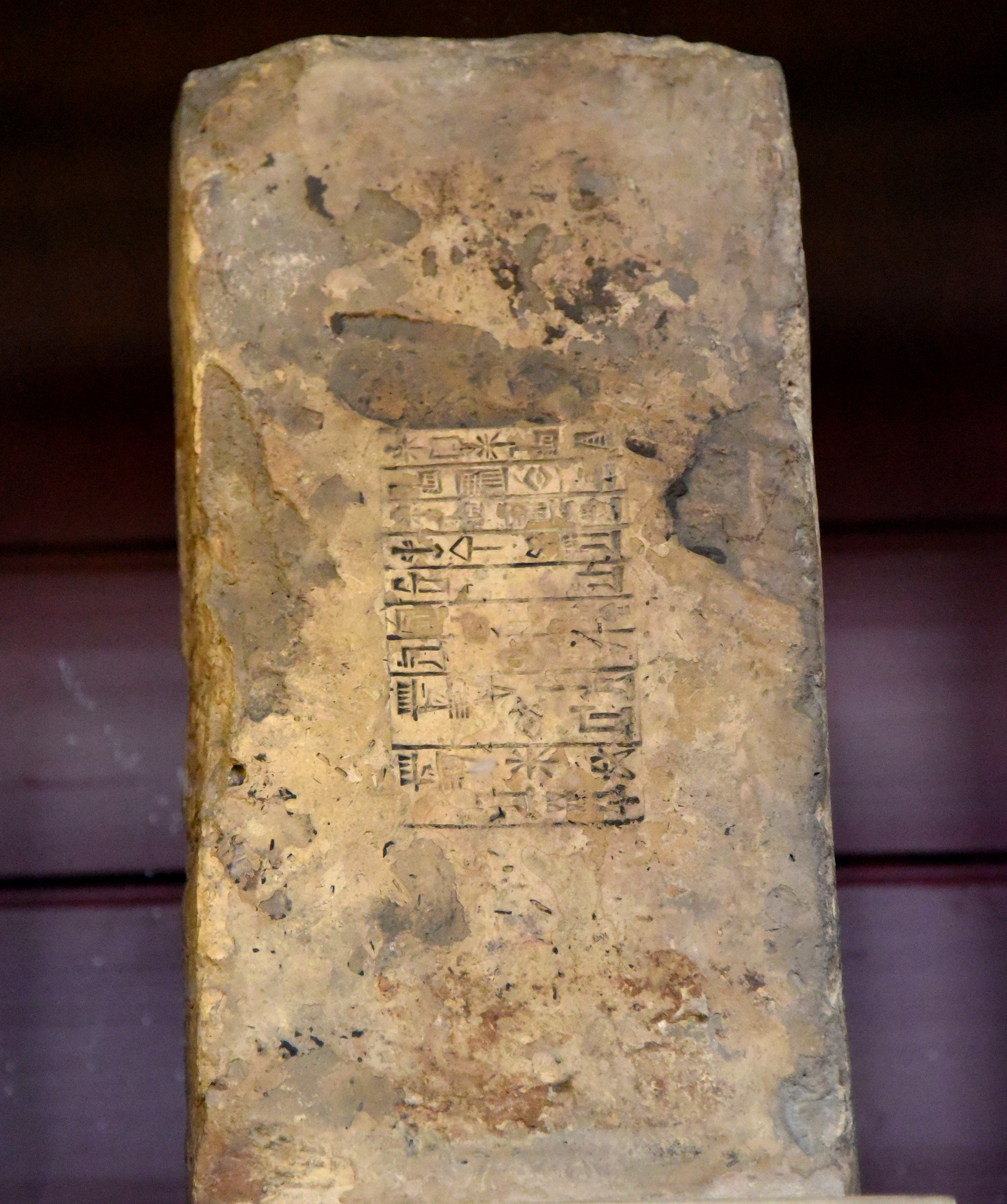
Fired clay brick stamped with the name of Amar-Sin, Ur III, from Eridu. British Museum.

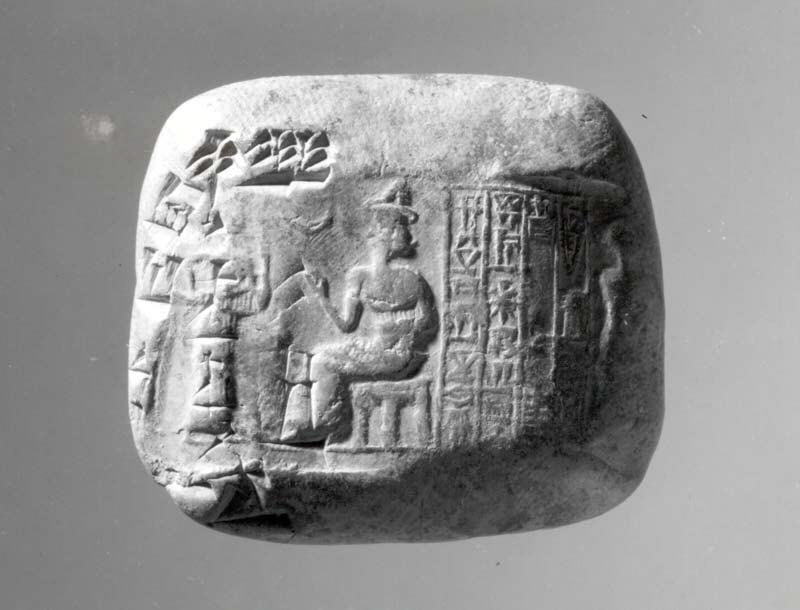
Cuneiform tablet impressed with cylinder seal. Receipt of goats, ca. 2040 BC, year 7 of Amar-Sin. Neo-Sumerian.

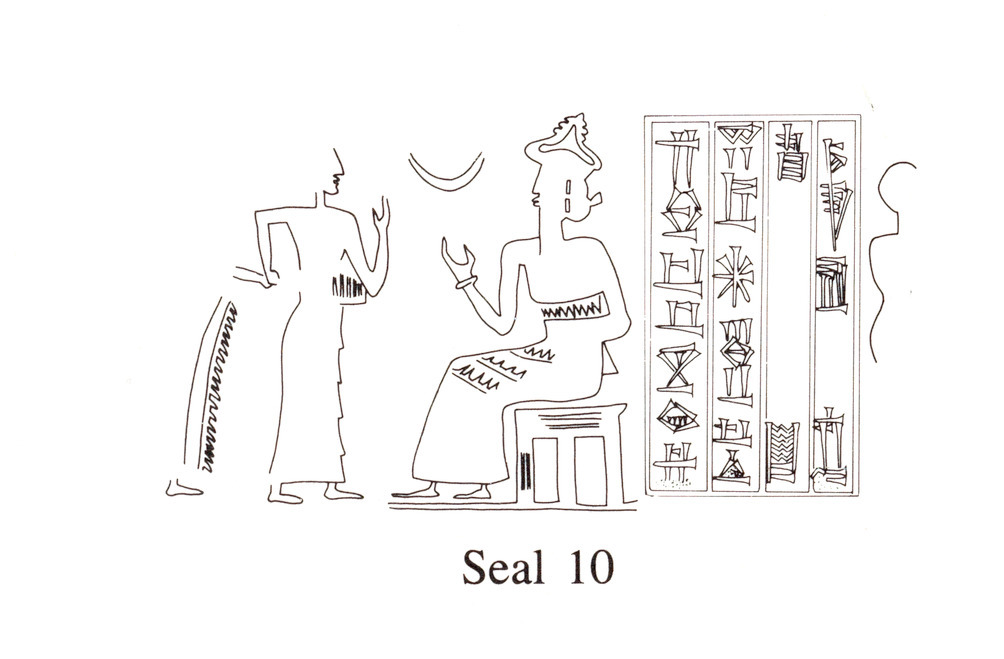
Cuneiform tablet impressed with cylinder seal. Receipt of goats, c. 2040 BC. Neo-Sumerian (drawing).

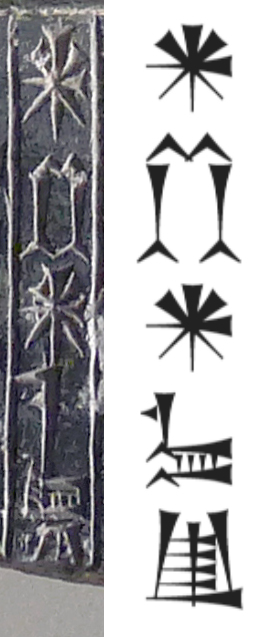
Inscription with the name "Amar-Sin"

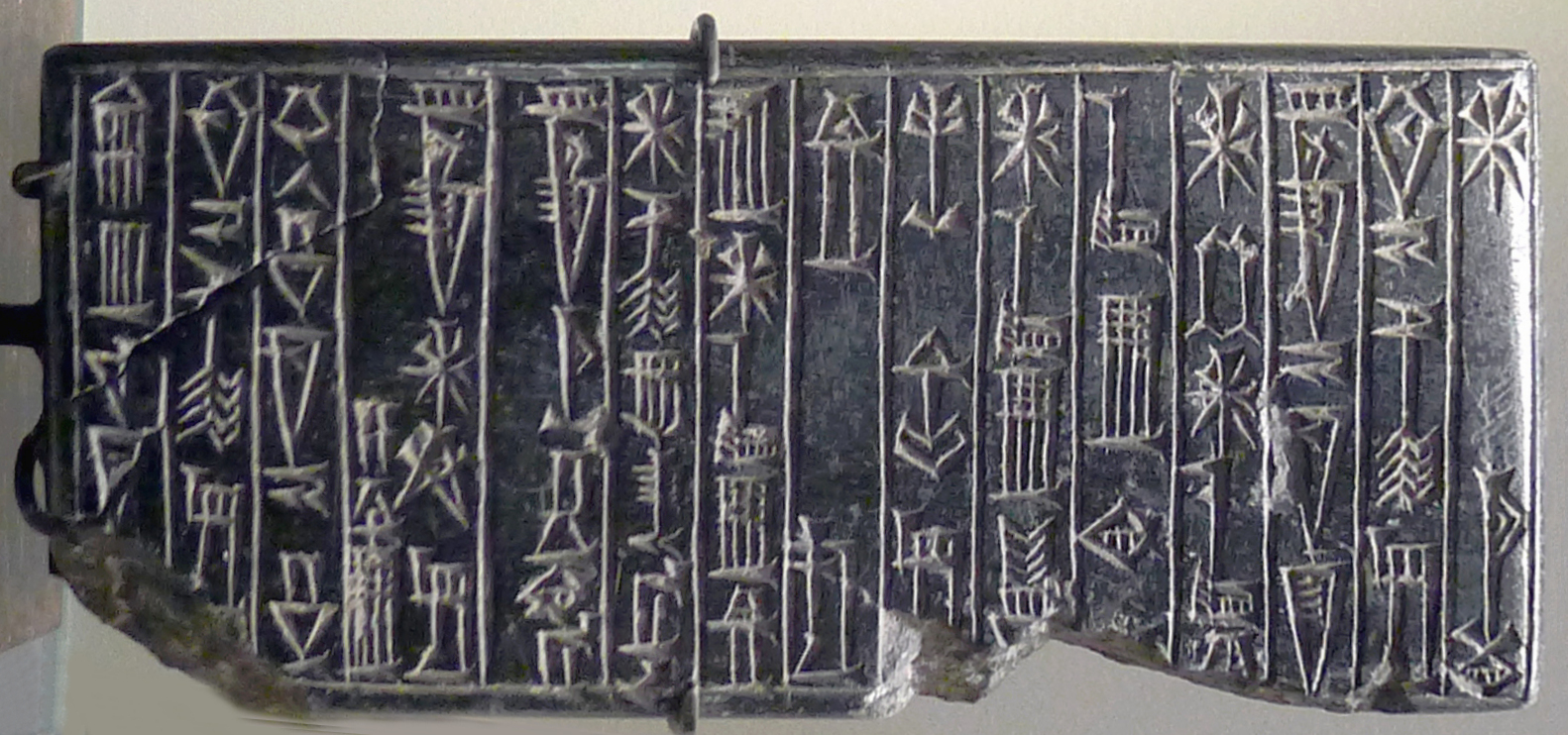
Dedication tablet of Amar-Sin

== See also ==
- Correspondence of the Kings of Ur
- Mashkan-shapir

== Notes ==
Regnal titles
Preceded by Shulgi	King of Ur c. 2046 – c. 2037 BC	Succeeded by Shu-Sin
