= Samaʼila Mamman =

Nigerian politician

Senator of the Federal Republic of Nigeria from Katsina State Central District
- In office May 1999 – May 2003
- Succeeded by: Umar Ibrahim Tsauri

Personal details
- Born: Katsina State, Nigeria
- Party: People's Democratic Party (PDP)
- Education: B. Sc Economics, Ahmadu Bello University, zaria, PGD Development Economics, Obafemi Awolowo University Ile-Ife
- Alma mater: Ahmadu Bello University, Zaria
- Profession: Economist

Samaʼila Mamman was elected senator for the Katsina Central constituency of Katsina State, Nigeria at the start of the Nigerian Fourth Republic, running on the People's Democratic Party (PDP) platform. He took office on 29 May 1999.

== Birth and early career ==
Mamman attended Government College, Kaduna (1968–1969) and was admitted to Ahmadu Bello University, Zaria, graduating in 1972 with a B.Sc. Economics. He earned a Post Graduate Diploma in Development Economics from the University of Ife in 1973. He joined the Federal Civil Service, retiring as a Permanent Secretary. He was appointed Commissioner for Finance in Kaduna State, Minister of Trade in 1986 and Minister of Agriculture in 1990. Entering private business, he became managing director of Kaduna Investments Company, and served on the Board of New Africa Merchant Bank, Bank of the North, the Nigeria Stock Exchange (Kaduna), Cement Company of Northern Nigeria and Katsina Oil Mills.

== Senate career ==
After taking his seat in the Senate in June 1999, Mamman was appointed to committees on Ethics, Security & Intelligence, Environment, Commerce, Finance & Appropriation (chairman) and National Planning. Mamman was appointed Senate Leader, but resigned in August 2000 following publication of a report by a panel headed by Senator Ibrahim Kuta investigating financial irregularities in Senate contracts, and the impeachment of Senate President Chuba Okadigbo. A BBC News report implied that the resignation was because Mamman had been accused of corruption. However, in October 2002, he sued New Nigerian Newspapers for publishing a story that alleged he resigned because he had been found guilty of wrongdoing by the Kuta panel. He stated he had resigned voluntarily.

In an assessment of Senators in December 2001, ThisDay asserted that he was rarely present in the chamber. After the International Court of Justice decision in October 2002 that the Bakassi peninsula belonged to Cameroun, Mamman urged caution to avoid the risk of war. Due to friction with President Olusegun Obasanjo and his supporter in the Senate, Mamman left the PDP for the All Nigeria People's Party (ANPP) before the 2003 elections.

== Later career ==
In 2005 Mamman received a national honour of an Officer of the Order of the Federal Republic (OFR). He joined the Board of UnityBank Plc in 2006.
