= Abdul Yandoma =

Nigerian politician

Abdu Umar Yandoma

Senator for Katsina North
- In office May 1999 – May 2003
- Succeeded by: Mahmud Kanti Bello

Personal details
- Born: Katsina State, Nigeria
- Party: People's Democratic Party (PDP)

Abdu Umar Yandoma was elected Senator for the Katsina North (Daura/Ingawa) constituency of Katsina State, Nigeria at the start of the Nigerian Fourth Republic, running on the People's Democratic Party (PDP) platform. He took office on 29 May 1999.

After taking his seat in the Senate in June 1999, Yandoma was appointed to the Senate standing committees on Petroleum, Solid Minerals (chairman), Transport, Niger Delta, Government Affairs and Federal Capital Territory. In a December 2001 survey of Senators, ThisDay characterized Yandoma as a "benchwarmer", meaning that he had contributed little to debates or other business.

In November 2002, it was reported that he had ceded the 2003 PDP candidacy for Katsina North in favor of former minister of state for Foreign Affairs, Ambassador Zakari Ibrahim. However, by December 2002 he was unopposed in his bid to be PDP candidate for the seat. He competed against former Senator Kanti Bello of the All Nigeria People's Party (ANPP), whom he had defeated in the 1999 elections. Kanti Bello went on to win the election.
