= Mohammed Tukur Liman =

Nigerian politician

Senator for Katsina South
- In office 29 May 1999 – 29 May 2003
- Succeeded by: Abu Ibrahim

Personal details
- Born: Katsina State, Nigeria

Mohammed Tukur Liman was elected Senator for the Katsina South constituency of Katsina State, Nigeria at the start of the Nigerian Fourth Republic, running on the People's Democratic Party (PDP) platform. He took office on 29 May 1999.

After taking his seat in the Senate in June 1999, Liman was appointed to committees on Banking & Currency, Communication (vice chairman), Education and Special Projects. He was appointed Senate Majority Leader. As head of a committee set up to review government revenue flows and budget implementation, in August 2002 he made an interim report that indicated the need for further probes. Some Senate members considered that non-implementation of the budget could be cause for impeachment of President Olusegun Obasanjo.
