= Umar Ibrahim Tsauri =

Nigerian politician

Senator 5th National Assembly
- Constituency: Katsina Central senatorial district

Personal details
- Occupation: Politician

Umar Ibrahim Tsauri is a Nigerian politician who served as a senator representing the Katsina Central senatorial district in the 5th National Assembly.

He served as the former National Secretary of the People's Democratic Party (PDP) but was suspended by the Katsina State chapter of the party in 2021 over allegations of anti-party activities.

== See also ==
- Nigerian senators of the 5th National Assembly
