= Kurfi Umaru =

Nigerian politician (born 1952)

Umaru Ibrahim Kurfi was in born 1952 in a local government called Kurfi. He is an APC party member and was a Senator in the National Assembly of Nigeria until May 2019. Umaru was educated in Nigeria but attended one summer session at Kansas State University in the United States. He represented Katsina Central between 2015 and 2019. He was defeated in an APC primary.

He attended Katsina Government College where he obtained his WASC and then proceeded to Ahmadu Bello University (ABU) Zaria, where he obtained an Ordinary National Diploma (OND) in 1976. He then travelled to the United Kingdom and attended the City University London, where he obtained a master's degree in business administration.
