= Puzur-Ashur I =

Assyrian king

Puzur-Ashur I 𒁍𒀫𒀸𒋩

1st King of Assyria
- Reign: c. 2025 – c. 2008 BC
- Successor: Shalim-ahum
- Died: c. 2008 BC
- Issue: Shalim-ahum

Puzur-Ashur I (Akkadian: 𒁍𒀫𒀸𒋩, romanized: Pu-AMAR-Aš-ŠUR; died c. 2008 BC) was an Assyrian king in the 21st century BC. He is generally regarded as the founder of Assyria as an independent state, c. 2025 BC, although there are predecessors listed on the Assyrian King List dating to the early 22nd century BC.

He is in the Assyrian King List and is referenced in the inscriptions of later kings (his son and successor Shalim-ahum and the later Ashur-rim-nisheshu and Shalmaneser III). These later kings mentioned him among the kings who had renewed the city walls of Assur begun by Kikkia.

Inscriptions link Puzur-Aššur I to his immediate successors, who, according to the Assyrian King List, are related to the following kings down to Erišum II.

Puzur-Ashur I's successors bore the title Išši’ak Aššur, vice regent of Assur, as well as ensí.

== See also ==
- Timeline of the Assyrian Empire
- Early Period of Assyria
- List of Assyrian kings
- Assyrian continuity
- Assyria

Preceded by	King of Assyria c. 2025 – c. 2008 BC	Succeeded by Shalim-ahum
