= Mahmud Kanti Bello =

Nigerian politician (1945–2017)

Senator of the Federal Republic of Nigeria from Katsina State
- In office 2003–2011
- Preceded by: Abdu Yandoma
- Succeeded by: Sirika Hadi
- Constituency: Katsina North

Personal details
- Born: January 14, 1945
- Died: August 29, 2017 (aged 72) Abuja
- Party: Congress for Progressive Change (CPC)
- Profession: Politician

Mahmud Kanti Bello (14 January 1945 – 29 August 2017) was a Nigerian senator who represented Katsina North Senatorial District of Katsina State, on the platform of People's Democratic Party and was the Senate majority whip. He became senator in 2003 and was re-elected in 2007. He represented Daura Senatorial Zone between 2003 and 2007 and for the second time after reelection, from 2007 to 2011. He was the pioneer Managing Director of Katsina Steel Rolling Mill.

== Background ==
Mahmud Kanti Bello was born on 14 January 1945, and is of Hausa origin. He received a Bachelor of Engineering degree from Ahmadu Bello University in Zaria, Kaduna State in Northern Nigeria.

== Career ==
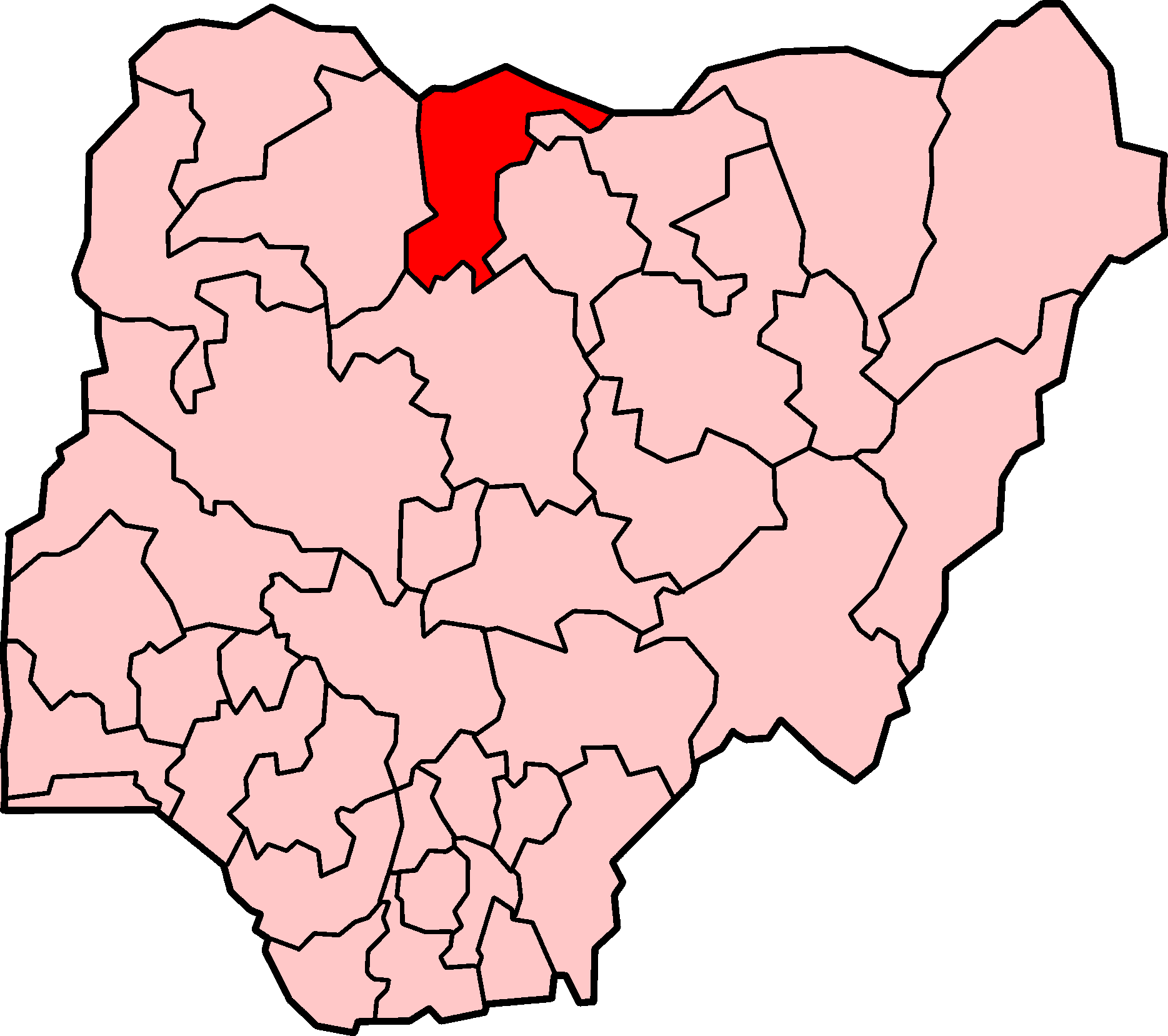
Katsina State in Nigeria

Mahmud Kanti Bello was elected senator during the 2003 Nigeria general elections under the platform of the All Nigeria Peoples Party (ANPP) in Katsina State. Bello protested strongly against electoral fraud in a 2004 local elections held in his state, which resulted in People's Democratic Party (PDP) candidates being returned. However, in 2007 he successfully ran for reelection on a PDP slate. By the middle of his second term in the senate, Bello was among those senators who had not solely sponsored any private bills.

In a statement in January 2009, Bello lashed out against governors who withhold local government funds, releasing them only at their convenience, including the governor of his state, Ibrahim Shema. In discussion over the proposed bill to control desertification, Senator Bello strongly opposed Senator Grace Folashade Bent, chair of the Senate Committee on Environment and Ecology, who wanted to include other environmental issues in the bill.

In July 2009, South-South senators initiated a motion to demand dismissal of Minister of Petroleum, Rilwan Lukman, and Mohammed Barkindo of the Nigerian National Petroleum Corporation, on the basis of alleged anti-Niger Delta policies. Senator Bello opposed the motion on a point of order, without success. In 2009, Bello was the Nigerian Amir-Hajj for the Nigerian pilgrims to Saudi Arabia. He broke a record where for the first time in over 20 years all the pilgrims left on time.

== Bibliography ==
- Muhammad Bawa, Garba (1993). Katsina State Pictorial and Historical Sketches. Katsina: Katsina State Historical Sketches. ISBN 9789789394890
