= Abu Ibrahim (Nigerian politician) =

Nigerian politician

Senator for Katsina South (Funtua)
- In office May 2003 – May 2007
- Preceded by: Mohammed Tukur Liman
- Succeeded by: Garba Yakubu Lado

Senator for Katsina South (Funtua)
- Incumbent
- Assumed office May 2011
- Preceded by: Garba Yakubu Lado
- Succeeded by: Bello Mandiya

Personal details
- Born: Katsina State, Nigeria
- Party: All Progressives Congress (APC)

Abu Ibrahim is a Nigerian politician who was elected Senator for the Katsina South (Funtua) Senatorial district in April 2003 on the All Nigeria Peoples Party (ANPP) platform, serving for one term until May 2007. He was re-elected to the same seat in April 2011.

Ibrahim previously worked in the federal civil service before joining politics.

== Life ==
Ibrahim earned his school leaving certificate from Government College, Keffi. He graduated from Ahmadu Bello University and then joined the Kaduna State civil service. He was posted to the governor's office as an assistant secretary. He spent considerable years as a civil servant in the governor's office and intermittently traveled abroad to earn a diploma in economic planning and a master's degree in economics. In the late 1970s, he was transferred to the newly created state housing corporation, an outfit he championed while working at the governor's office as a means the government could use to reduce some social-economic problems such as housing. In 1979, when the Federal Capital Development Authority moved its offices from Lagos to Suleja, Ibrahim was posted as Director of Administration of FCDA.

== Political career ==
Ibrahim was a senator during the Third Nigerian Republic. After the truncation of the republic, he went back to his private life. However, he belonged to some organizations that were opposed to the self succession bid of Sani Abacha.

During the Fourth Nigerian republic, Ibrahim was chairman of the Katsina branch of the People's Democratic Party (PDP) for some months. He resigned from this position at the 2002 National Convention of the party after unsubstantiated allegations were made against him. Ibrahim was elected Senator for the Katsina South (Funtua) Senatorial district in April 2003 on the All Nigeria Peoples Party (ANPP) platform. In August 2006, he was expelled from the ANPP, as was former President Muhammadu Buhari, also from Katsina. Both were accused of anti-party activities and disregard for the party constitution.

In April 2007, Ibrahim competed unsuccessfully for Governor of Katsina State. In February 2010, he followed the lead of Muhammadu Buhari in resigning from the ANPP. He competed in the April 2011 elections to become Senator for Katsina South (Funtua) on the Congress for Progressive Change (CPC) platform. He received 324,652 votes, defeating the People's Democratic Party (PDP) candidate, Tukur Ahmed Jikamshi, who trailed with 198,927. Jikamshi was formerly deputy governor of the state.

Ibrahim was involved in merger negotiations between CPC and Action Congress and was an intermediary between Bola Tinubu of AC and Buhari of CPC. The negotiations fell through at the time, only to re-emerge prior to the 2015 elections.

Ibrahim became deputy minority chief whip of the senate between 2011 and 2015. He introduced a citizens' rights bill that allowed residents who have domiciled in a location for more than twenty years to be recognized as indigenes of the community.

In 2015, he was returned to the senate under the All Progressive Congress, a merger of AC, CPC and some politicians from PDP.
