= Greeks in Turkey =

Greek minority in Turkey

Έλληνες στην Τουρκία Türkiye'deki Rumlar

Total population
- 2,000-3,500 (not incl. Muslim Greeks or Greek Muslims)

Regions with significant populations
- Istanbul, İzmir, Çanakkale (Gökçeada and Bozcaada)

Languages
- Greek (first language of the majority), Turkish (first language of the minority or second language)

Religion
- Greek Orthodoxy

Related ethnic groups
- Greek Muslims, Pontic Greeks, Cappadocian Greeks, Antiochian Greeks

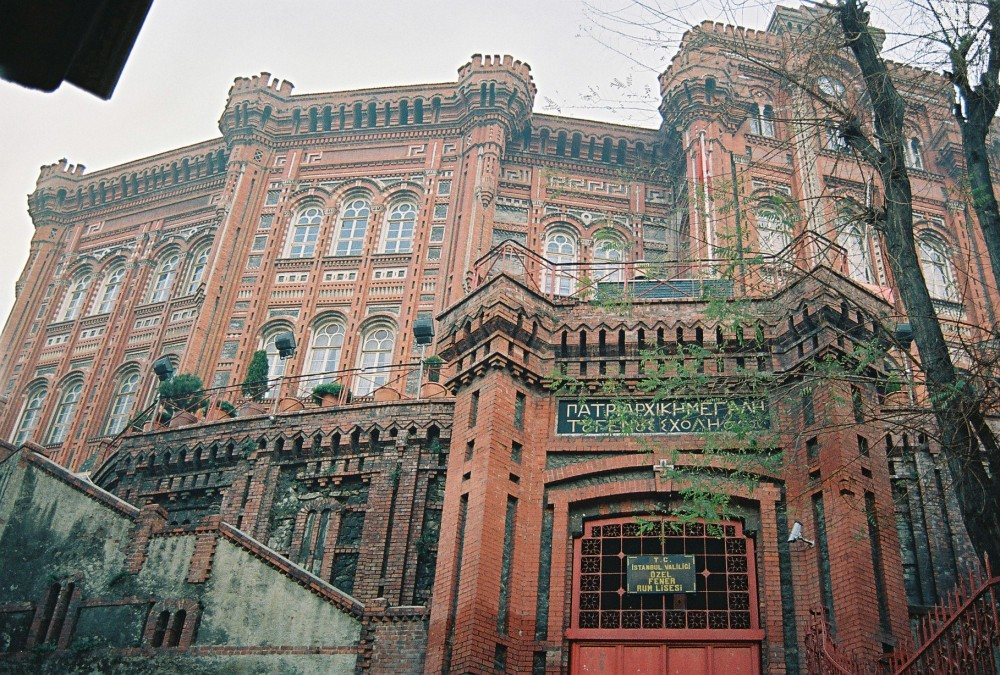
Phanar Greek Orthodox College is a Greek minority school that was founded in the Ottoman Empire in 1454.

The Greeks in Turkey constitute a small population of Greek and Greek-speaking Eastern Orthodox Christians who mostly live in Istanbul, as well as on the two islands of the western entrance to the Dardanelles: Imbros and Tenedos (Turkish: Gökçeada and Bozcaada). Greeks are one of the four ethnic minorities officially recognized in Turkey by the 1923 Treaty of Lausanne, together with Jews, Armenians, and Bulgarians.

They are the remnants of the estimated 200,000 Greeks who were permitted under the provisions of the Convention Concerning the Exchange of Greek and Turkish Populations to remain in Turkey following the 1923 population exchange, which involved the forcible resettlement of approximately 1.2 million Greeks from Anatolia and East Thrace and of half a million Turks from all of Greece except for Western Thrace. After years of persecution (e.g. the Varlık Vergisi, the Istanbul Pogrom and the 1964 expulsion of Istanbul Greeks), emigration of ethnic Greeks from the Istanbul region greatly accelerated, reducing the Greek minority population from 119,822 before the 1955 pogrom to about 7,000 by 1978. The 2008 figures released by the Turkish Foreign Ministry places the current number of Turkish citizens of Greek descent at the 3,000–4,000 mark. However, according to the Human Rights Watch the Greek population in Turkey is estimated at 2,500 in 2006. The Greek population in Turkey is collapsing as the community is now far too small to sustain itself demographically, due to emigration, much higher death rates than birth rates and continuing discrimination.

Since 1924, the status of the Greek minority in Turkey has been ambiguous. Beginning in the 1940s, the government instituted repressive policies forcing many Greeks to emigrate. Examples are the labour battalions drafted among non-Muslims during World War II, as well as the Fortune Tax (Varlık Vergisi) levied mostly on non-Muslims during the same period. These resulted in financial ruination and death for many Greeks. The exodus was given greater impetus with the Istanbul Pogrom of September 1955 and the 1964 expulsion of Istanbul Greeks which led to thousands of Greeks fleeing the city, eventually reducing the Greek population to about 7,000 by 1978 and to about 2,500 by 2006. According to the United Nations, this figure was much smaller in 2012 and reached 2,000. As of 2023, according to The Economist, "Turkey's Greeks are on the verge of extinction".

A minority of Muslim Pontic Greek speakers, using a dialect called "Romeyka" or "Ophitic", still live in the area around Of in north-eastern Anatolia.

== Name ==
The Greeks of Turkey are referred to in Turkish as Rumlar, meaning "Romans". This derives from the self-designation Ῥωμαῖος (Rhomaîos, pronounced ro-ME-os) or Ρωμιός (Rhomiós, pronounced ro-mee-OS or rom-YOS) used by Byzantine Greeks, who were the continuation of the Roman Empire in the east.

The ethnonym Yunanlar is exclusively used by Turks to refer to Greeks from Greece, and not for the Greek population of Turkey (nor for the Greek Cypriot population of Cyprus, who are referred to as Kıbrıslı Rumlar).

In Greek, Greeks from Asia Minor are referred to as Greek: Μικρασιάτες or Greek: Ανατολίτες (Mikrasiátes or Anatolítes, lit. "Asia Minor-ites" and "Anatolians"), while Greeks from Pontos (Pontic Greeks) are known as Greek: Πόντιοι (Póntioi).

Greeks from Istanbul are known as Greek: Κωνσταντινουπολίτες (Konstantinoupolítes, lit. "Constantinopolites"), most often shortened to Greek: Πολίτες (Polítes, pronounced po-LEE-tes).

== History ==
=== Background ===
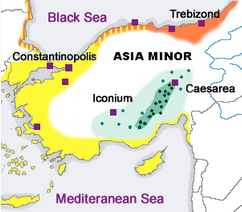
Distribution of Anatolian Greeks in 1910. Demotic Greek speakers in yellow. Pontic in orange. Cappadocian Greek in green. Shaded regions do not indicate that Greek-speakers were a majority.

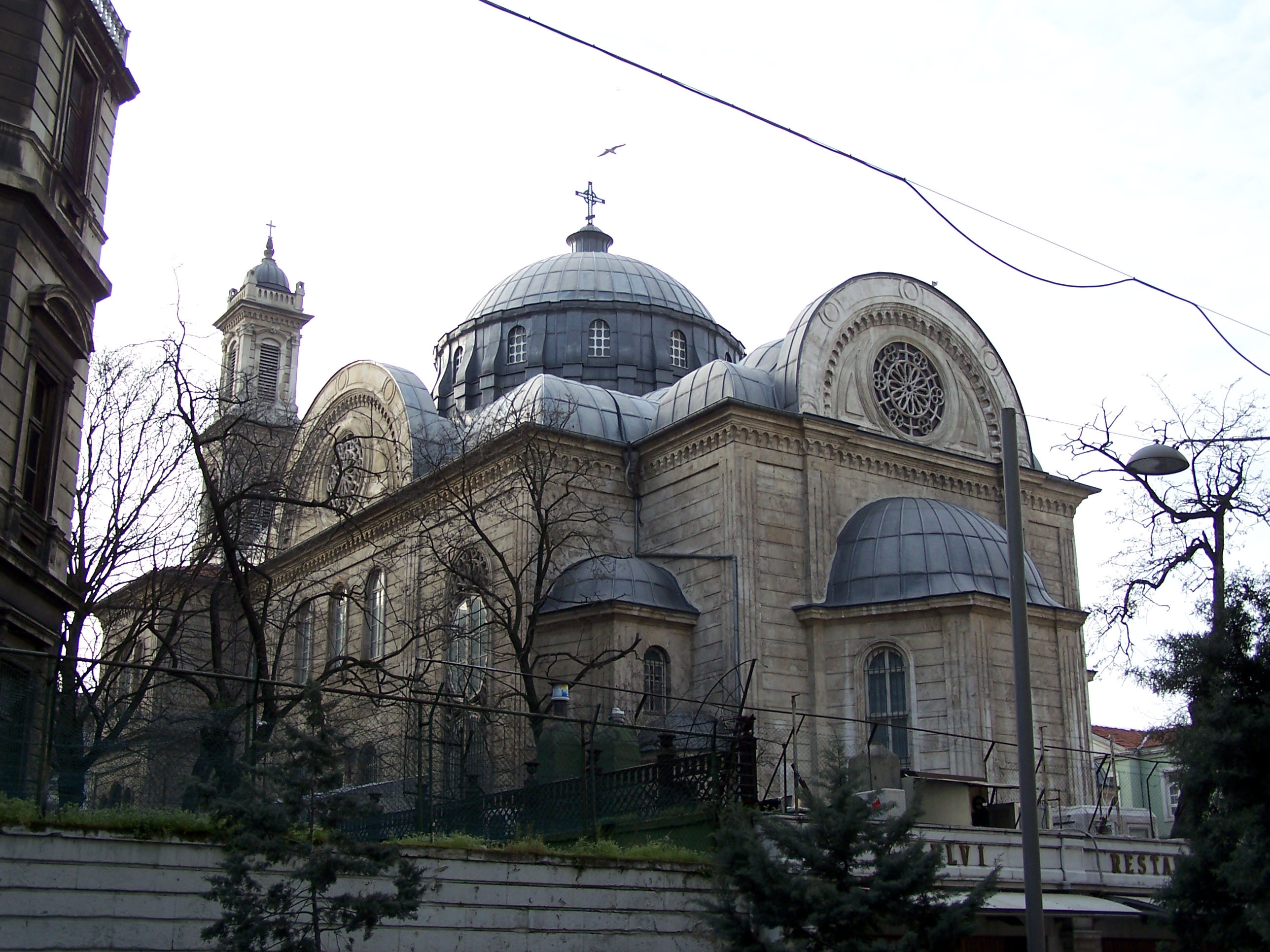
Agia Triada Greek Orthodox church in Beyoğlu, Istanbul

Greeks have been living in what is now Turkey continuously since the middle 2nd millennium BC. Following upheavals in mainland Greece during the Bronze Age Collapse, the Aegean coast of Asia Minor was heavily settled by Ionian and Aeolian Greeks and became known as Ionia and Aeolia. During the era of Greek colonization from the 8th to the 6th century BC, numerous Greek colonies were founded on the coast of Asia Minor, both by mainland Greeks as well as settlers from colonies such as Miletus. The city of Byzantium, which would go on to become Constantinople and Istanbul, was founded by colonists from Megara in the 7th century BC.

Following the conquest of Asia Minor by Alexander the Great, the rest of Asia Minor was opened up to Greek settlement. Upon the death of Alexander, Asia Minor was ruled by a number of Hellenistic kingdoms such as the Attalids of Pergamum. A period of peaceful Hellenization followed, such that the local Anatolian languages had been supplanted by Greek by the 1st century BC. Asia Minor was one of the first places where Christianity spread, so that by the 4th century AD it was overwhelmingly Christian and Greek-speaking. For the next 600 years, Asia Minor and Constantinople, which eventually became the capital of the Byzantine Empire, would be the centers of the Hellenic world, while mainland Greece experienced repeated barbarian invasions and went into decline.

Following the Battle of Manzikert in 1071, the Seljuk Turks swept through all of Asia Minor. While the Byzantines would recover western and northern Anatolia in subsequent years, central Asia Minor was settled by Turkic peoples and never again came under Byzantine rule. The Byzantine Empire was unable to stem the Turkic advance, and by 1300 most of Asia Minor was ruled by Anatolian beyliks. Smyrna (Turkish: İzmir) fell in 1330, and Philadelphia (Turkish: Alaşehir), fell in 1398. The last Byzantine Greek kingdom in Anatolia, the Empire of Trebizond, covering the Black Sea coast of north-eastern Turkey to the border with Georgia, fell in 1461.

=== Ottoman Empire ===
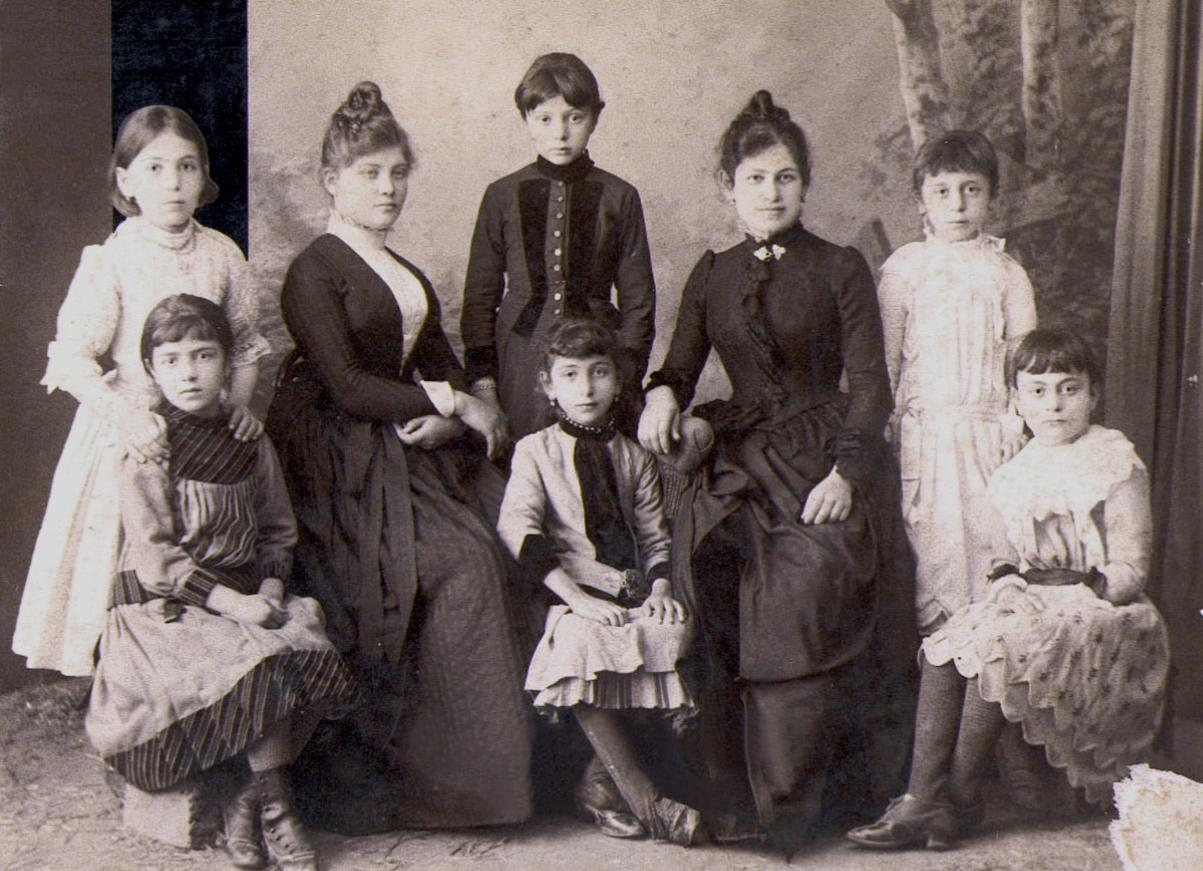
Pontic Greek ladies and children of Trebizond, early 20th century

Constantinople fell in 1453, marking the end of the Byzantine Empire. Beginning with the Seljuk invasion in the 11th century, and continuing through the Ottoman years, Anatolia underwent a process of Turkification, its population gradually changing from predominantly Christian and Greek-speaking to predominantly Muslim and Turkish-speaking.

Ottoman Empire followed the Sharia rules and there were restrictions regarding the building and restoration of churches. Ottoman documents display that restriction on non-Muslims applied differently depending on the regions. After the Tanzimat reforms in 1839, the Christians could get a permission to repair an old church easier, but still they had to follow specific procedures and were supervised by the local Muslim authorities and population.

A class of moneyed ethnically Greek merchants (they commonly claimed noble Byzantine descent) called Phanariotes emerged in the latter half of the 16th century and went on to exercise great influence in the administration in the Ottoman Empire's Balkan domains in the 18th century. They tended to build their houses in the Phanar quarter of Istanbul in order to be close to the court of the Ecumenical Patriarch of Constantinople, who under the Ottoman millet system was recognized as both the spiritual and secular head (millet-bashi) of all the Orthodox subjects (the Rum Millet, or the "Roman nation") of the Empire, often acting as archontes of the Ecumenical See. For all their cosmopolitanism and often western (sometimes Roman Catholic) education, the Phanariots were aware of their Hellenism; according to Nicholas Mavrocordatos' Philotheou Parerga: "We are a race completely Hellenic".

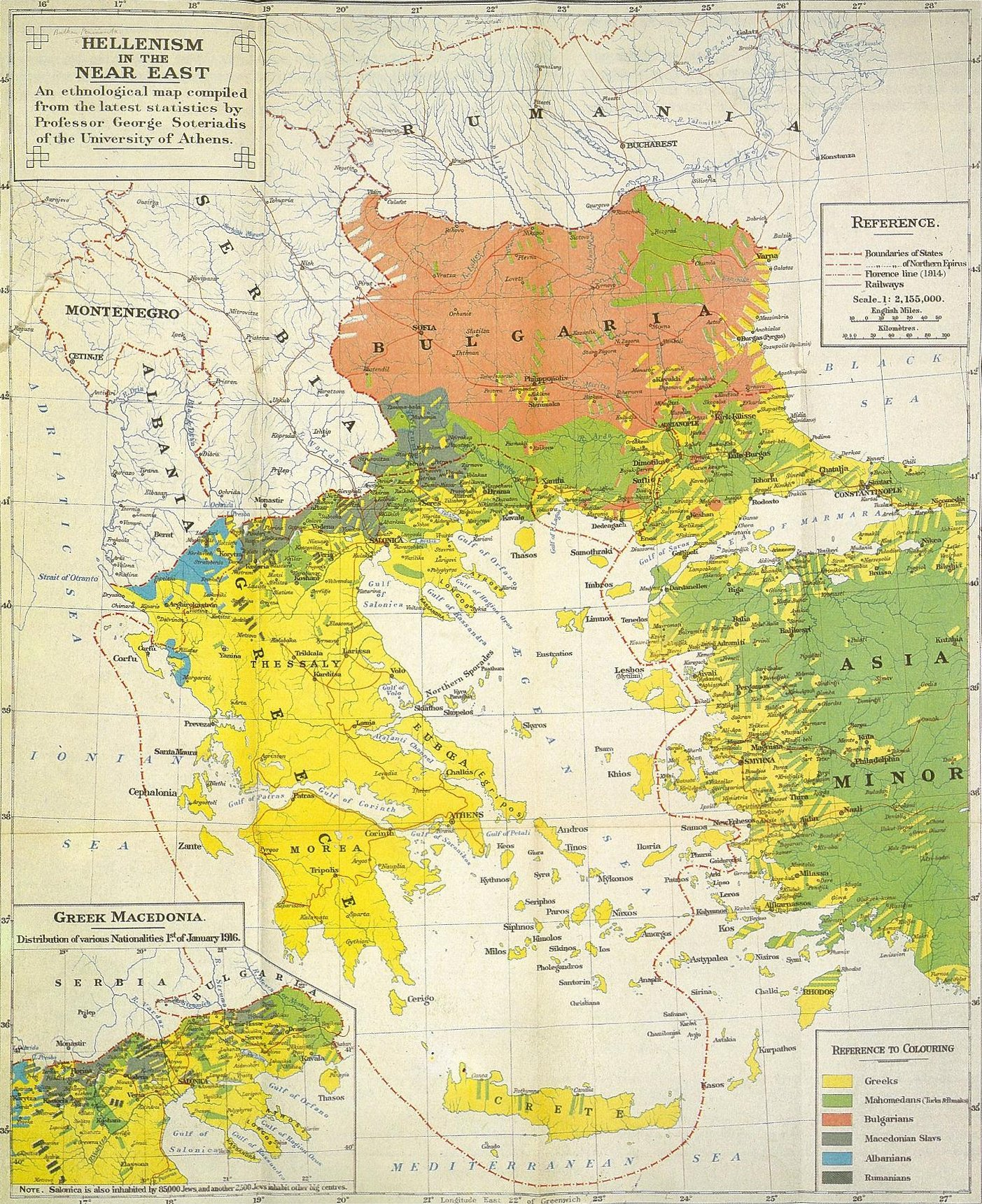
The Greek Kingdom and the Greek diaspora in the Balkans and western Asia Minor, according to Professor G. Soteiriadis, 1919

The first Greek millionaire in the Ottoman era was Michael Kantakouzenos Shaytanoglu, who earned 60.000 ducats a year from his control of the fur trade from Russia; he was eventually executed on the Sultan's order. It was the wealth of the extensive Greek merchant class that provided the material basis for the intellectual revival that was the prominent feature of Greek life in the second half of the 18th century and the beginning of the 19th century. Greek merchants endowed libraries and schools; on the eve of the Greek War of Independence the three most important centres of Greek learning, schools-cum-universities, were situated in Chios, Smyrna and Aivali, all three major centres of Greek commerce.

The outbreak of the Greek War of Independence in March 1821 was met by mass executions, pogrom-style attacks, the destruction of churches, and looting of Greek properties throughout the Empire. The most severe atrocities occurred in Constantinople, in what became known as the Constantinople Massacre of 1821. The Orthodox Patriarch Gregory V was executed on April 22, 1821 on the orders of the Ottoman Sultan, which caused outrage throughout Europe and resulted in increased support for the Greek rebels.

By the late 19th and early 20th century, the Greek element was found predominantly in Constantinople and Smyrna, along the Black Sea coast (the Pontic Greeks) and the Aegean coast, the Gallipoli peninsula and a few cities and numerous villages in the central Anatolian interior (the Cappadocian Greeks). The Greeks of Constantinople constituted the largest Greek urban population in the Eastern Mediterranean.

In the first half of 1914, the Ottoman authorities expelled more than 100,000 Ottoman Greeks to Greece.

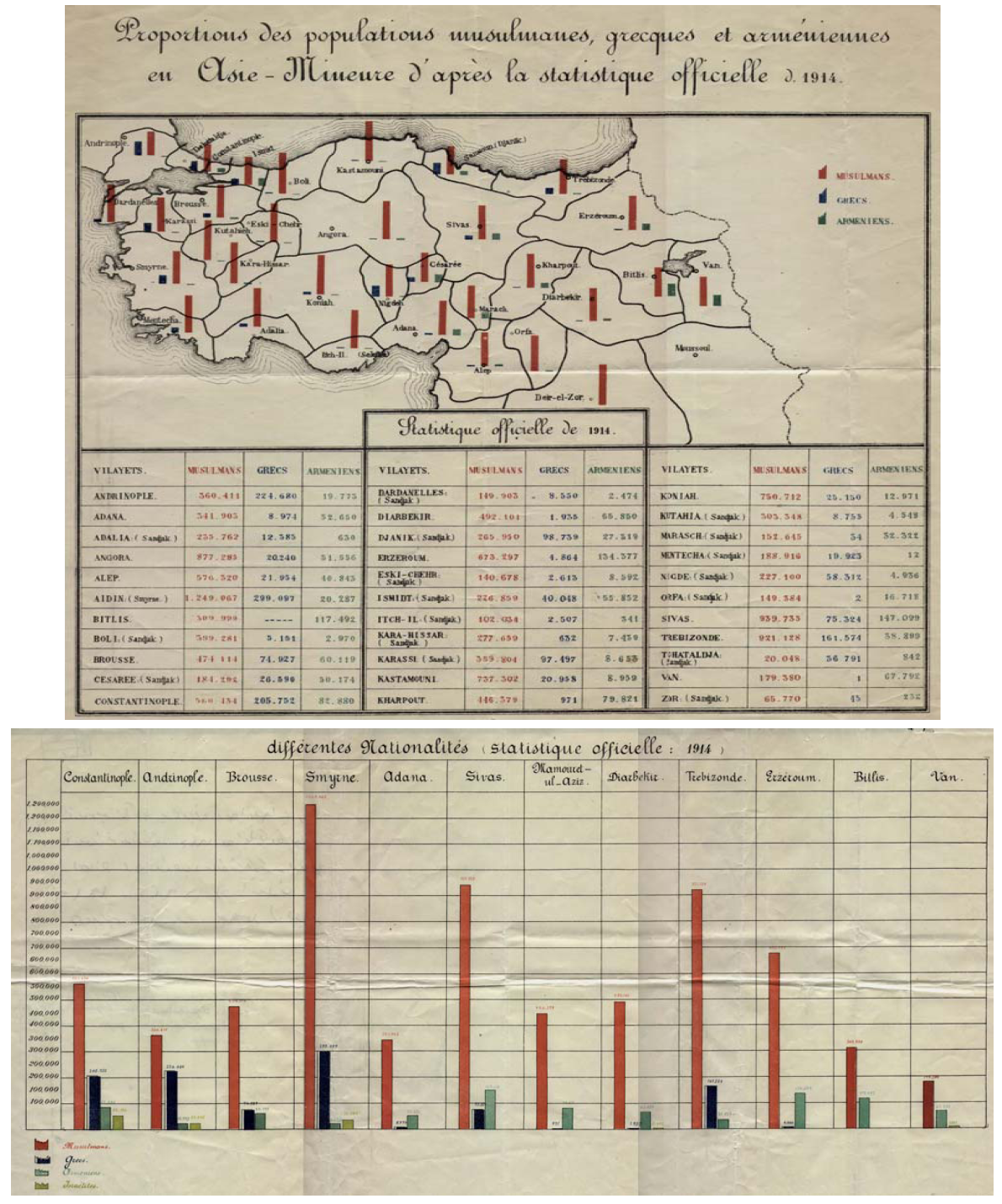
1914 document showing the official figures from the 1914 population census of the Ottoman Empire. The total population (sum of all the millets) was given at 20,975,345, and the Greek population was given at 1,792,206.

=== World War I and its aftermath ===
Given their large Greek populations, Constantinople and Asia Minor featured prominently in the Greek irredentist concept of Megali Idea (lit. "Great Idea") during the 19th century and early 20th century. The goal of Megali Idea was the liberation of all Greek-inhabited lands and the eventual establishment of a successor state to the Byzantine Empire with Constantinople as its capital. The Greek population amounted to 1,777,146 (16.42% of population during 1910).

During World War I and its aftermath (1914–1923), the government of the Ottoman Empire and subsequently the Turkish National Movement, led by Mustafa Kemal Atatürk, instigated a violent campaign against the Greek population of the Empire. The campaign included massacres, forced deportations involving death marches, and summary expulsions. According to various sources, several hundreds of thousand Ottoman Greeks died during this period. Some of the survivors and refugees, especially those in Eastern provinces, took refuge in the neighbouring Russian Empire.

Following Greece's participation on the Allied side in World War I, and the participation of the Ottoman Empire on the side of the Central Powers, Greece received an order to land in Smyrna by the Triple Entente as part of the planned partition of the Ottoman Empire.

On May 15, 1919, twenty thousand Greek soldiers landed in Smyrna, taking control of the city and its surroundings under cover of the Greek, French, and British navies. Legal justifications for the landings was found in the article 7 of the Armistice of Mudros, which allowed the Allies "to occupy any strategic points in the event of any situation arising which threatens the security of Allies." The Greeks of Smyrna and other Christians greeted the Greek troops as liberators. By contrast, the majority of the Muslim population saw them as an invading force.

Subsequently, the Treaty of Sèvres awarded Greece Eastern Thrace up to the Chatalja lines at the outskirts of Constantinople, the islands of Imbros and Tenedos, and the city Smyrna and its vast hinterland, all of which contained substantial Greek populations.

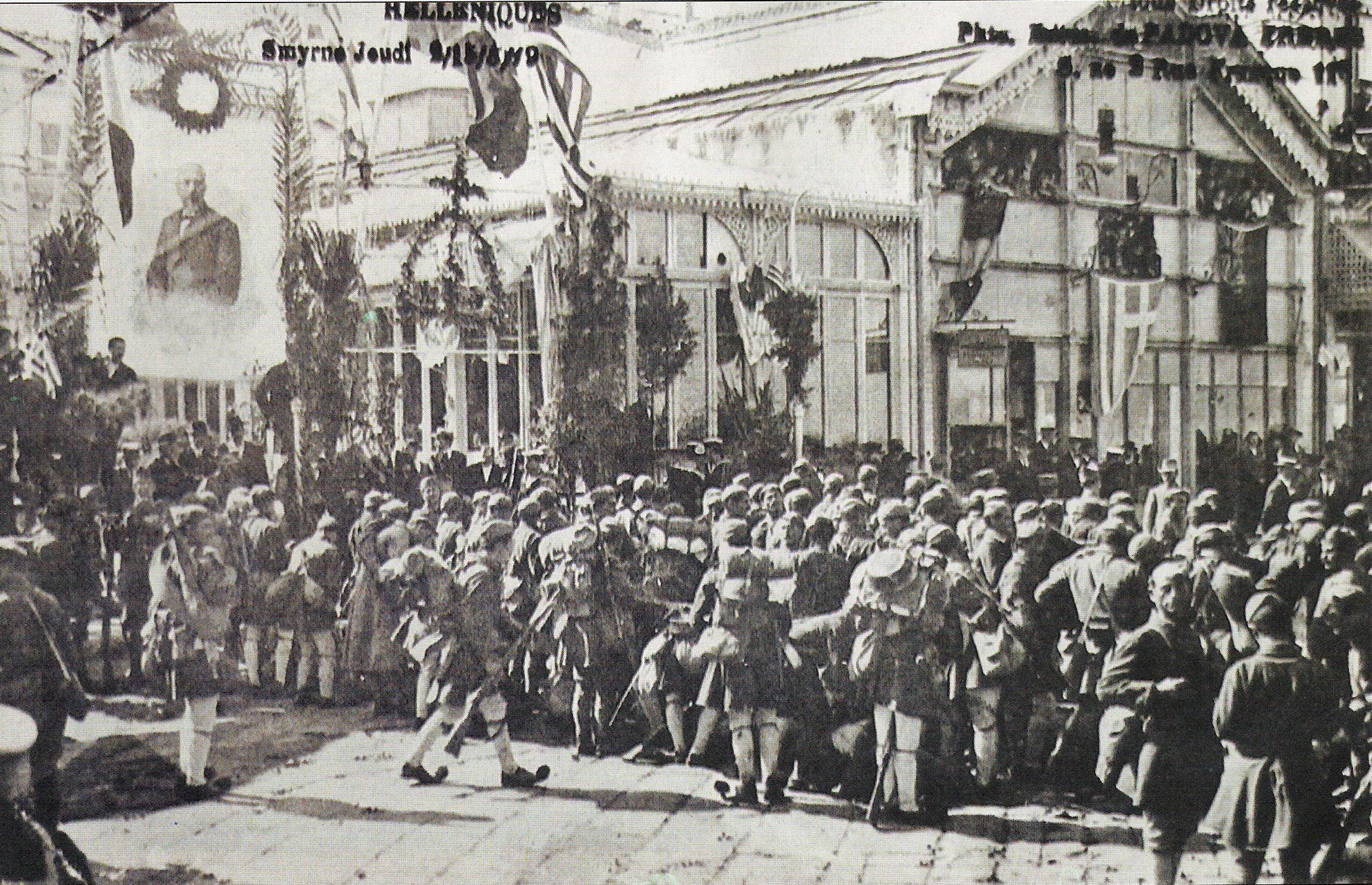
Greek soldiers taking their posts in Smyrna amidst the jubilant ethnic Greek population of the city, 15 May 1919.

During the Greco-Turkish War, a conflict which followed the Greek occupation of Smyrna in May 1919 and continued until the Great Fire of Smyrna in September 1922, atrocities were perpetrated by both the Greek and Turkish armies. For the massacres that occurred during the Greco-Turkish War of 1919–1922, British historian Arnold J. Toynbee wrote that it was the Greek landings that created the Turkish National Movement led by Mustafa Kemal: "The Greeks of 'Pontus' and the Turks of the Greek occupied territories, were in some degree victims of Mr. Venizelos's and Mr. Lloyd George's original miscalculations at Paris."

After the end of the Greco-Turkish War, most of the Greeks remaining in the Ottoman Empire were transferred to Greece under the terms of the 1923 population exchange between Greece and Turkey. The criteria for the population exchange were not exclusively based on ethnicity or mother language, but on religion as well. That is why the Karamanlides (Greek: Καραμανλήδες; Turkish: Karamanlılar), or simply Karamanlis, who were a Turkish-speaking (while they employed the Greek alphabet to write it) Greek Orthodox people of unclear origin, were deported from their native regions of Karaman and Cappadocia in Central Anatolia to Greece as well. On the other hand, Cretan Muslims who were part of the exchange were re-settled mostly on the Aegean coast of Turkey, in areas formerly inhabited by Christian Greeks. Populations of Greek descent can still be found in the Pontos, remnants of the former Greek population that converted to Islam in order to escape the persecution and later deportation. Though these two groups are of ethnic Greek descent, they speak Turkish as a mother language and are very cautious to identify themselves as Greeks, due to the hostility of the Turkish state and neighbours towards anything Greek.

=== Republic of Turkey ===
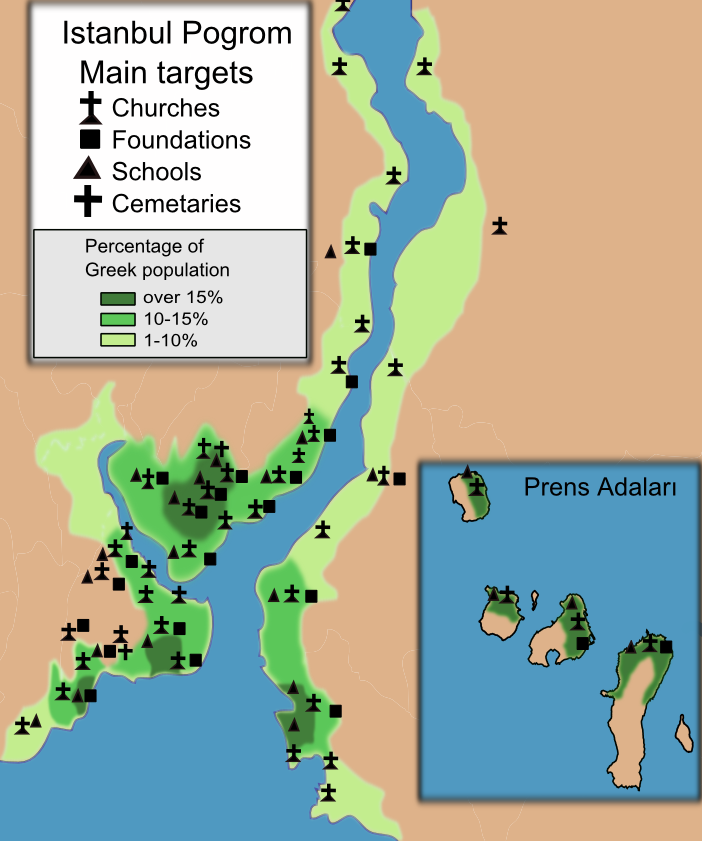
The main targets of the Istanbul pogrom; 6–7 September 1955.

Due to the Greeks' strong emotional attachment to their first capital as well as the importance of the Ecumenical Patriarchate for Greek and worldwide orthodoxy, the Greek population of Constantinople was specifically exempted and allowed to stay in place. Article 14 of the Treaty of Lausanne (1923) also exempted Imbros and Tenedos islands from the population exchange and required Turkey to accommodate the local Greek majority and their rights. For the most part, the Turks disregarded this agreement and implemented a series of contrary measures which resulted in a further decline of the Greek population, as evidenced by demographic statistics.

In 1923, the Ministry of Public Works asked from the private companies in Turkey to prepare lists of employees with their religion and later ordered them to fire the non-Muslim employees and replace them with Muslim Turks. In addition, a 1932 parliamentary law, barred Greek citizens living in Turkey from a series of 30 trades and professions from tailoring and carpentry to medicine, law and real estate. In 1934, Turkey created the Surname Law which forbade certain surnames that contained connotations of foreign cultures, nations, tribes, and religions. Many minorities, including Greeks, had to adopt last names of a more Turkish rendition. As from 1936, Turkish became the teaching language (except the Greek language lessons) in Greek schools. The Wealthy Levy imposed in 1942 also served to reduce the economic potential of Greek businesspeople in Turkey. When the Axis attacked on Greece during WW2 hundreds of volunteers from the Greek community of Istanbul went to fight in Greece with the approval of Turkish authorities.

In 6–7 September 1955 an anti-Greek pogrom were orchestrated in Istanbul by the Turkish military's Tactical Mobilization Group, the seat of Operation Gladio's Turkish branch, the Counter-Guerrilla. The events were triggered by the news that the Turkish consulate in Thessaloniki, north Greece—the house where Mustafa Kemal Atatürk was born in 1881—had been bombed the day before. A bomb planted by a Turkish usher of the consulate, who was later arrested and confessed, incited the events. The Turkish press conveying the news in Turkey was silent about the arrest and instead insinuated that Greeks had set off the bomb. Although the mob did not explicitly call for Greeks to be killed, over a dozen people died during or after the pogrom as a result of beatings and arson. Jews, Armenians and others were also harmed. In addition to commercial targets, the mob clearly targeted property owned or administered by the Greek Orthodox Church. 73 churches and 23 schools were vandalized, burned or destroyed, as were 8 asperses and 3 monasteries.

The pogrom greatly accelerated emigration of ethnic Greeks from Turkey, and the Istanbul region in particular. The Greek population of Turkey declined from 119,822 persons in 1927, to about 7,000 by 1978. In Istanbul alone, the Greek population decreased from 65,108 to 49,081 between 1955 and 1960.

In 1964 Turkish prime minister İsmet İnönü unilaterally renounced the Greco-Turkish Treaty of Friendship of 1930 and took actions against the Greek minority that resulted in massive expulsions. Turkey enforced strictly a long‐overlooked law barring Greek nationals from 30 professions and occupations. For example, Greeks could not be doctors, nurses, architects, shoemakers, tailors, plumbers, cabaret singers, iron-smiths, cooks, tourist guides, etc. Many Greeks were ordered to give up their jobs after this law. Also, Turkish government ordered many Greek‐owned shops to close leaving many Greek families destitute. In addition, Turkey has suspended a 1955 agreement granting unrestricted travel facilities to nationals of both countries. A number of Greeks caught outside Turkey when this suspension took effect and were unable to return to their homes in Turkey. Moreover, Turkey once again deported many Greeks. They were given a week to leave the country, and police escorts saw to it that they make the deadline. Deportees protested that it was impossible to sell businesses or personal property in so short a time. Most of those deported were born in Turkey and they had no place to go in Greece. Greeks had difficulty receiving credit from banks. Those expelled, in some cases, could not dispose of their property before leaving. Furthermore, it forcefully closed the Prinkipo Greek Orthodox Orphanage, the Patriarchate's printing house and the Greek minority schools on the islands of Gökçeada/Imbros and Tenedos/Bozcaada. Furthermore, the farm property of the Greeks on the islands were taken away from their owners. Moreover, university students were organizing boycotts against Greek shops. Teachers of schools maintained by the Greek minority complained of frequent "inspections" by squads of Turkish officers inquiring into matters of curriculum, texts and especially the use of the Greek language in teaching. In late 1960, the Turkish treasure seized the properties of the Balıklı Greek Hospital. The hospital sued the treasury on the ground that the transfer of its property was illegal, but the Turkish courts were in favor of the Turkish treasure. On August 4, 2022, a fire broke out on the roof of the Balıklı Greek Hospital. The roof was completely destroyed and the upper floor was also destroyed except for the exterior walls. However, the ground floor of the hospital remained unscathed from the fire.

In 1965 the Turkish government established on Imbros an open agricultural prison for Turkish mainland convicts; farming land was expropriated for this purpose. Greek Orthodox communal property was also expropriated and between 1960 and 1990 about 200 churches and chapels were reportedly destroyed. Many from the Greek community on the islands of Imbros and Tenedos responded to these acts by leaving. In addition, at the same year the first mosque was built in the island. It was named Fatih Camii (Conqueror's Mosque, after Mehmed II who conquered Constantinople and ended the Eastern Roman Empire) and was built on an expropriated Greek Orthodox communal property at the capital of the island.

In 1991, Turkish authorities ended the military "forbidden zone" status on the island of Imbros.

In 1992, Panimbrian Committee mentioned, that members of the Greek community are "considered by the authorities to be second class citizens" and that the local Greeks are afraid to express their feelings, to protest against certain actions of the authorities or the Turkish settlers, or even to allow anybody to make use of their names when they give some information referring to the violation of their rights, fearing the consequences which they will have to face from the Turkish authorities. The same year the Human Rights Watch report concluded that the Turkish government has denied the rights of the Greek community on Imbros and Tenedos in violation of the Lausanne Treaty and international human rights laws and agreements.

In 1997, the Turkish state seized the Prinkipo Greek Orthodox Orphanage which had been forcefully closed in 1964. After many years of court battles, Turkey returned the property to the Greek community in 2012.

In August 2002, a new law was passed by the Turkish parliament to protect the minorities rights, because of Turkey's EU candidacy. With this new law, it prevented the Turkish treasury from seizing community foundations properties.

On 15 August 2010, a ritual was held for the Assumption of Mary at the Sumela Monastery after an 88 years old ban. This annual ritual continues, although it often sparks debate in Turkey for “keeping foreign traditions alive on the day Trabzon was captured by the Turks.”.

=== Current situation ===
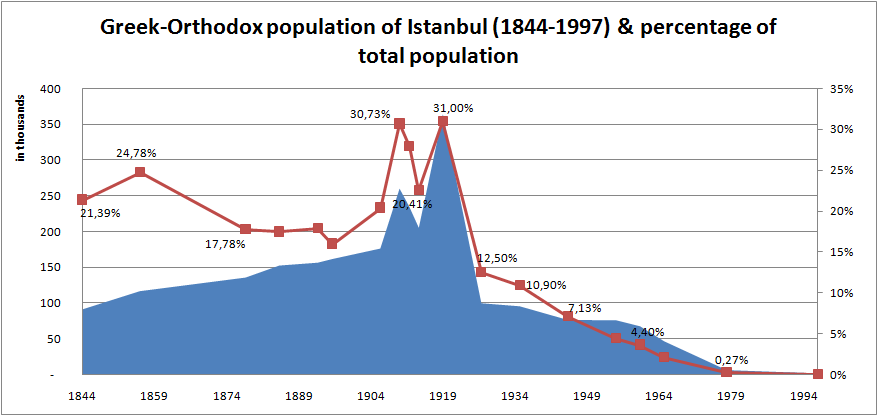
Greek population in Istanbul (1844-1997) and percentage of the total city population

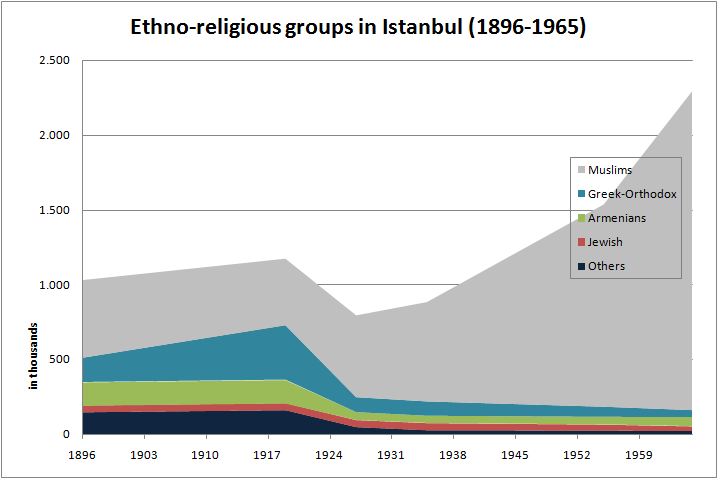
Ethno-religious groups in Istanbul (1896-1965). A multicultural city in 1896, with a 50.5% Muslim population, turned into a predominantly Muslim one after 1925.

Today most of the remaining Greeks live in Istanbul. In the Fener district of Istanbul where the Ecumenical Patriarchate of Constantinople is located, fewer than 100 Greeks live today. A handful also live in other cities of Anatolia. Most are elderly.

Another location where the Greek community lives is the islands Imbros and Tenedos near the Dardanelles, but this community diminished rapidly during the 20th century and only 200 elderly Greeks have remained there, less than 2%. In the 1950s, an estimated 98% of the island was Greek. In the last years the condition of the Greek community in these islands seems to be slightly improving.

The Antiochian Greeks (Rum) living in Hatay are the descendants of the Ottoman Levant's and southeast Anatolia's Greek population and are part of the Greek Orthodox Church of Antioch. They did not emigrate to Greece during the 1923 population exchange because at that time the Hatay province was under French control. The majority of the Antiochian Greeks moved to Syria and Lebanon at 1939, when Turkey took control of the Hatay region, however a small population remained at this area. After a process of Arabization and Turkification that took place in the 20th century, today almost their entirety speaks Arabic as a mother language. This has made them hard to distinguish from the Arab Christians and some argue that they have become largely homogenized. Their majority doesn't speak Greek at all, the younger generation speaks Turkish, and some have Turkish names now. Their population is about 18,000, and they are faithful to the Patriarchate of Antiochia, although ironically it is now in Damascus. They reside largely in Antakya and/or the Hatay province, but a few are also in Adana province.

The Greek minority continues to encounter problems relating to education and property rights. A 1971 law nationalized religious high schools, and closed the Halki seminary on Istanbul's Heybeli Island which had trained Orthodox clergy since the 19th century. A later outrage was the vandalism of the Greek cemetery on Imbros on October 29, 2010. In this context, problems affecting the Greek minority on the islands of Imbros and Tenedos continue to be reported to the European Commission.

In July 2011, Istanbul's Greek minority newspaper Apoyevmatini declared that it would shut down due to financial difficulties. The four-page Greek-language newspaper faced closure due to financial problems that had been further aggravated by the economic crisis in Greece, when Greek companies stopped publishing advertisements in the newspaper and the offices have already been shut down. This ignited campaign to help the newspaper. Among the supporters were students from Istanbul Bilgi University who subscribed to the newspaper. The campaign saved the paper from bankruptcy for the time being. Because the Greek community is close to extinction, the obituary notices and money from Greek foundations, as well as subscriptions overwhelmingly by Turkish people, are the only sources of income. This income covers only 40 percent of the newspaper expenditures.

That event was followed in September 2011 by a government cash grant of 45,000 Turkish liras to the newspaper through the Turkish Press Advertisement Agency, as part of a wider support of minority newspapers. The Turkish Press Advertisement Agency also declared intention to publish official government advertisements in minority newspapers including Greek papers Apoyevmatini and IHO.

As of 2007, Turkish authorities have seized a total of 1,000 immovables of 81 Greek organizations as well as individuals of the Greek community. On the other hand, Turkish courts provided legal legitimacy to unlawful practices by approving discriminatory laws and policies that violated fundamental rights they were responsible to protect. As a result, foundations of the Greek communities started to file complaints after 1999 when Turkey's candidacy to the European Union was announced. Since 2007, decisions are being made in these cases; the first ruling was made in a case filed by the Phanar Greek Orthodox College Foundation, and the decision was that Turkey violated Article 1 of Protocol No. 1 of the European Convention on Human Rights, which secured property rights.

A government decree published on 27 August 2011, paves the way to return assets that once belonged to Greek, Armenian, Assyrian, Kurd or Jewish trusts and makes provisions for the government to pay compensation for any confiscated property that has since been sold on, and in a move likely to thwart possible court rulings against the country by the European Court of Human Rights.

Since the vast majority of properties confiscated from Greek trusts (and other minority trusts) have been sold to third parties, which as a result cannot be taken from their current owners and be returned, the Greek trusts will receive compensation from the government instead. Compensation for properties that were purchased or were sold to third parties will be decided on by the Finance Ministry. However, no independent body is involved in deciding on compensation, according to the regulations of the government decree of 27 August 2011. If the compensation were judged fairly and paid in full, the state would have to pay compensation worth many millions of Euros for a large number of properties. Another weakness of the government decree is that the state body with a direct interest in reducing the amount of compensation paid, which is the Finance Ministry, is the only body permitted to decide on the amount of compensation paid. The government decree also states that minority trusts must apply for restitution within 12 months of the publication of the government decree, which was issued on 1 October 2011, leaving less than 11 months for the applications to be prepared and submitted. After this deadline terminates on 27 August 2012, no applications can be submitted, in which the government aims to settle this issue permanently on a legally sound basis and prevent future legal difficulties involving the European Court of Human Rights.

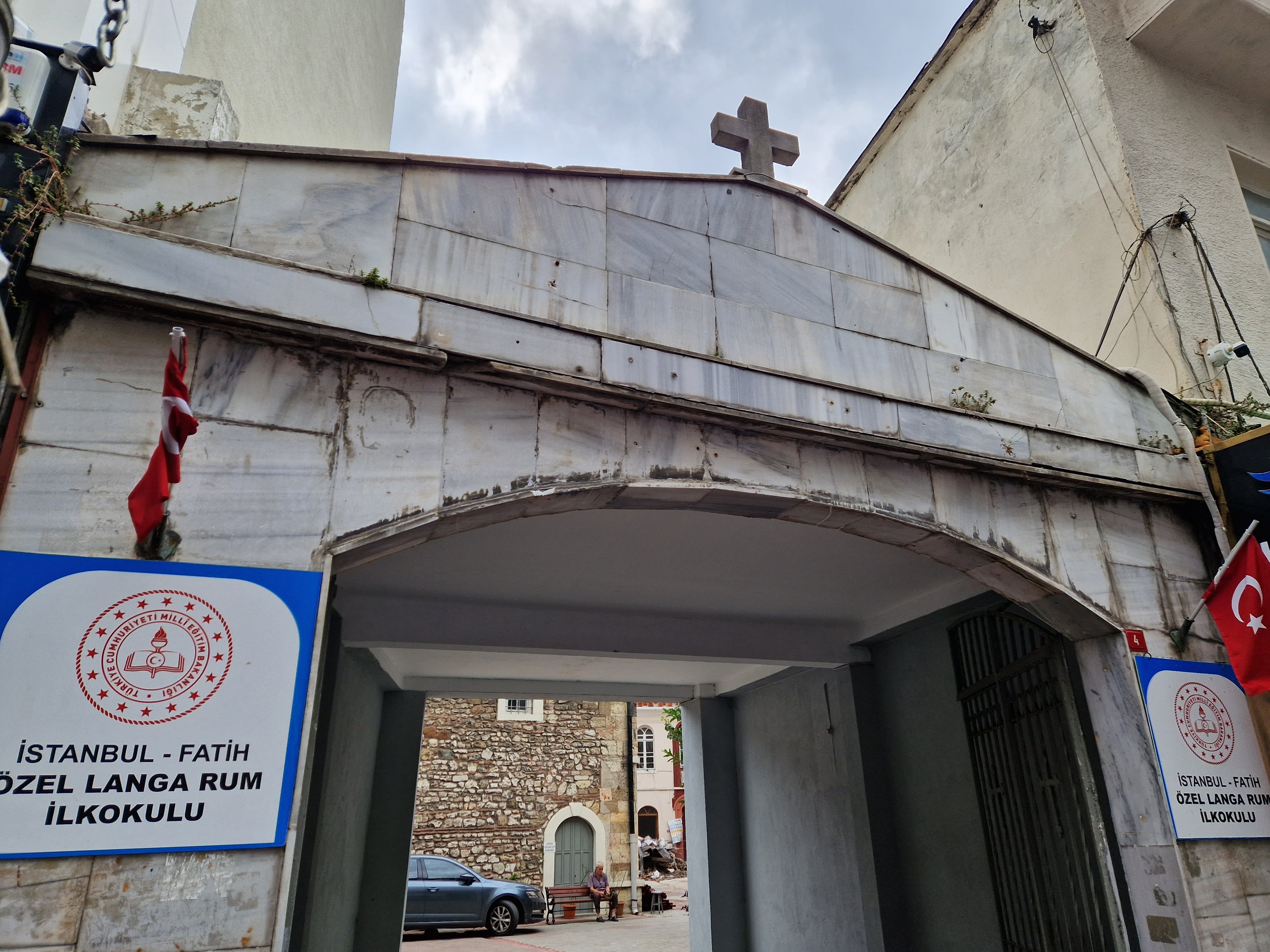
Greek Langa school in Yenikapi

== Demographics of Greeks in Istanbul ==
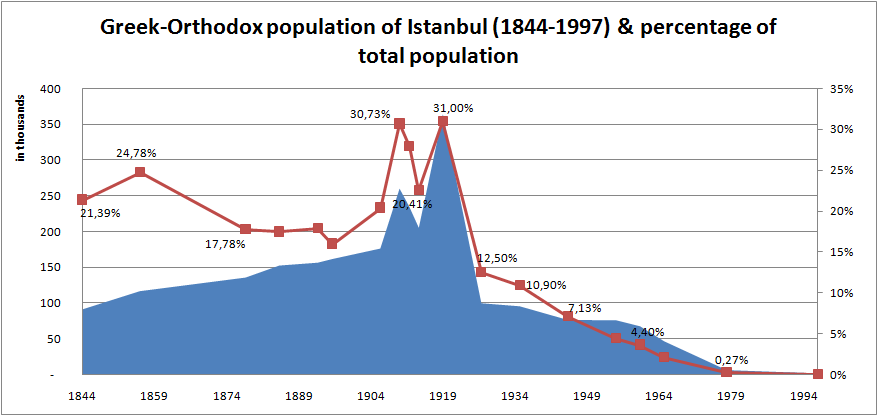
Greek population in Istanbul and percentages of the city population (1844–1997). The Turkish policies, after 1923, led virtually to the elimination of the Greek community.

The Greek community of Istanbul numbered 67,550 people in 1955. However, after the Istanbul Pogrom orchestrated by Turkish authorities against the Greek community in that year, their number was dramatically reduced to only 48,000. Today, the Greek community numbers about 2,000 people.

Year	People
1897	236,000
1923	100,000
1955	48,000
1978	7,000
2006	2,500
2008	2,000
2014	2,200–2,500

== Notable people ==
- Archbishop Alexander (1876–1942), Istanbul-born 1st Greek Orthodox Archbishop of America (1922-1930)
- Themos Asderis (1900–1975), Istanbul-born former footballer, manager and one of the main founders of Pera Club and AEK Athens
- Yorgo Bacanos (1900–1977), Istanbul-born master oud player and improvisational composer of Ottoman classical music
- Tamer Balcı (1917–1993), Istanbul-born sportsman and film actor
- Bartholomew I of Constantinople (born 1940), Imbros-born Ecumenical Patriarch of Constantinople since 1991
- Basil III of Constantinople (1846–1929), Istanbul-born Ecumenical Patriarch of Constantinople (1925–1929)
- Benedict I of Jerusalem (1892–1980), Bursa-born Greek Orthodox Patriarch of Jerusalem (1957–1980)
- Benjamin I of Constantinople (1871–1946), Edremit-born Ecumenical Patriarch of Constantinople (1936–1946)
- Gilbert Biberian (1944–2023), Istanbul-born British classical guitarist and composer
- Chrysanthos Mentis Bostantzoglou (1918–1995), Istanbul-born political cartoonist, playwright and painter
- Constantine VI of Constantinople (1859–1930), Istanbul-born Ecumenical Patriarch of Constantinople (1925–1929)
- Thomas Cosmades (1924–2010), Istanbul-born evangelical preacher and New Testament translator
- Kriton Curi (1942–1996), Istanbul-born environmentalist and academic at Boğaziçi University
- Demetrios I of Constantinople (1914–1991), Istanbul-born Ecumenical Patriarch of Constantinople (1918–1921)
- Antonis Diamantidis (1892–1945), Istanbul-born musician and rebetiko singer
- Dimitri from Paris (born 1963), Istanbul-born French DJ and music producer
- Savas Dimopoulos (born 1952), Istanbul-born particle physicist at Stanford University
- Violet Duca (born 1958), Istanbul-born former volleyball player and current Fenerbahçe Acıbadem manager
- Elpidophoros of America (born 1967), Istanbul-born Archbishop of the Greek Orthodox Archdiocese of America
- Ayla Erduran (1934–2025), Istanbul-born classical violinist
- Theoliptos Fenerlis (born 17 April 1957), Istanbul-born theologian and Metropolitan at Ecumenical Patriarchate
- Minas Gekos (born 1959), Istanbul-born professional basketball player and coach
- Germanus V of Constantinople (1830–1920), Istanbul-born Ecumenical Patriarch of Constantinople (1913–1918)
- Giorgos Giamalis (1907–1985), Istanbul-born Greek footballer and goalkeeper
- Michael Giannatos (1941–2013), Istanbulb-born actor
- Eva Grant (25 March 1925 – 22 January 2024), Istanbul-born British figure photographer
- Aleksandros Hacopulos (1911–1980), Istanbul-born politician and member of the Turkish Grand National Assembly
- Archbishop Iakovos of America (1911–2005), Imbros-born primate of the Greek Orthodox Archdiocese of America (1959–1996)
- Eftalya Işılay (1891–1939), Istanbul-born Ottoman Greek singer known as “Deniz Kızı Eftalya”
- Antonis Kafetzopoulos (born 1951), Istanbul-born actor
- Patroklos Karantinos (1903–1976), Istanbul-born architect of early modernism
- Kostas Karipis (1880–1952), Istanbul-born guitarist and singer
- Tchéky Karyo (1953–2025), Istanbul-born French actor and musician
- Koço Kasapoğlu (1935–2016), Istanbul-born footballer and manager
- Elia Kazan (1909–2003), Istanbul-born American film and theatre director, producer, screenwriter, co-founder of the Actors Studio
- Ulysses Kokkinos (1948–2022), Istanbul-born Australian football player and manager
- Hristo Kostanda (1918–1987), Istanbul-born footballer
- Nikos Kovis (born 1953), Istanbul-born footballer and manager
- Lefter Küçükandonyadis (1924–2012), Büyükada-born Fenerbahçe legend and member of the Turkish national football team
- İoanna Kuçuradi (1936-2026), Istanbul-born academic and philosopher, member of the board of trustees at Koç University
- Eleni Küreman (1921–2001), Istanbul-born Turkey's first professional female photojournalist
- Şermin Langhoff (born 1969), Bursa-born Turkish-German theatre director and Maxim Gorki Theater director
- Apolas Lermi (born 1986), Trabzon-born singer
- Robert Mallios Galić (born 1905–1973), Istanbul-born footballer and manager
- Andrew Mango (1926–2014), Istanbul-born British historian and author focused on Turkish studies
- Cyril Mango (1928–2021), Istanbul-born British scholar of Byzantine history, art, and architecture
- Kleanthis Maropoulos (1919–1991), Istanbul-born footballer
- Petros Markaris (born 1937), Istanbul-born author
- Maximus V of Constantinople (1897–1972), Sinop-born Ecumenical Patriarch of Constantinople (1946–1948)
- Adile Naşit (1930–1987), Istanbul-born actress
- Kostas Negrepontis (1897–1973), Istanbul-born footballer and manager
- Şükrü Özyıldız (born 1988), İzmir-born Turkish actor
- Photius II of Constantinople (1874–1935), Büyükada-born Ecumenical Patriarch of Constantinople (1929–1935)
- Konstantinos Psachos (1869–1949), Istanbul-born Greek scholar, musician, composer and musicologist
- Alekos Sofianidis (1933–2010), Istanbul-born footballer and manager who played for Beşiktaş and AEK Athens
- Konstantinos Spanoudis (1871–1941), Istanbul-born politician, founder and second president of AEK Athens
- Yannis Vasilis Yaylalı (born 1974), Samsun-born peace activist and promoter of Greek heritage in Turkey after finding out his Greek heritage
- Nilüfer Verdi (born 1956), Istanbul-born Turkish jazz pianist and composer
- Gregory Vlastos (1907–1991), Istanbul-born classical scholar of ancient Greek philosophy
- Aleko Yordan (1912–1986), Istanbul-born footballer who played internationally for Turkey
- Stavros Zurukzoglu (1896–1966), Istanbul-born physician and professor of bacteriology at the University of Bern

== See also ==
- Eastern Orthodoxy in Turkey
- Minorities in Turkey
- Treaty of Lausanne
- Population exchange between Greece and Turkey
- Istanbul Pogrom
- Imbros
- Tenedos
- Greek Muslims
- Pontic Greeks
- Antiochian Greeks
- Cretan Muslims
- Istanbul Greek dialect
