= Kostanda =

Kostanda is a surname. Notable people with the surname include:

- Apostol Kostanda (1817–1898), Imperial Russian division commander
- Hristo Kostanda (1918–1987), Turkish footballer
- V'iacheslav Kostanda (born 1963), Ukrainian water polo player
- Violet Kostanda Duca (born 1958), Turkish volleyball player and manager
