= Aleksandros Hacopulos =

Greek-Turkish politician

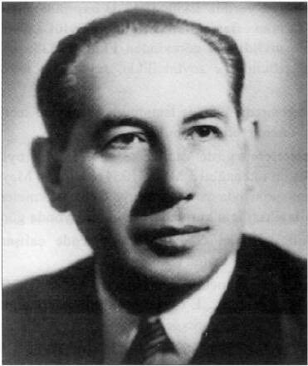

Member of the Grand National Assembly
- In office 14 May 1954 – 25 May 1960
- Constituency: Istanbul (1954, 1957)

Personal details
- Born: May 21, 1911 Kasımgürani, Fatih, Constantinople
- Died: March 27, 1980 (aged 68) Athens, Greece
- Party: Democrat Party

Aleksandros Hacopulos (1911–1980) was a politician, educator, economist and a member of Turkish Grand National Assembly of Greek origin.

== Early life and education ==
He was born on 21 May 1911 to a prominent Phanariote Greek banking family in Constantinople, Ottoman Empire. A relative of him, John Cyriaco Hacopulos served as mayor of Princes' Islands in 1890s. His family also owned famous Hazzopulo Passage in the Beyoğlu (Pera) neighborhood. His father's name was Constantine and mother's name was Euthymia. Alexandros completed his basic education at Fener Maraşlı Greek Primary School. He got his second education at Phanar Greek Orthodox College. He graduated from Istanbul Higher School of Economics and Commerce (part of modern Marmara University), completing the fields of mathematics, banking and insurance.

Hacopulos, started teaching at Phanar College in 1934, later worked as a teacher in economics and finance classes at Zografeion Lyceum and Zappeion High School for Girls in 1946, and as a principal at the same school. In the meantime, he completed his military service as a private in Haydarpaşa Military Hospital in 1936 and was discharged in 1937. In May 1941, he was conscripted for the second time in The Twenty Classes, which was formed from non-Muslims during World War II. After completing this service, he was discharged in 1942.

== Political career ==
While he was working as a principal at Zappeion High School since 1946, he was elected as Istanbul Deputy from the Democrat Party in 1954 Turkish general election. Hacopulos received his mandate on 5 May 1954 and joined the Turkish Grand National Assembly on 14 May 1954. He spoke against Istanbul Pogrom in the Grand Assembly, protesting how law enforcement didn't handle violence against Greeks, also criticizing CHP for not returning Wealth Tax money. He was elected again in 1957 Turkish general election 3 years later, from the same party. He was an intermediary between Greece and Turkey on solving the Cyprus dispute.

After 1960 Turkish coup d'état, he was arrested and taken to Yassıada. Here he was tried and acquitted by the Supreme Court of Justice for violating the Constitution. In addition, although the Yassıada Court opened a separate lawsuit for the illegitimate acquisition of wealth, after the investigation, he was acquitted from this lawsuit as well and the injunction on his properties was lifted. He was released on 15 September 1961 and left politics. He moved to Athens in 1978 and died there on 27 March 1980.

== Personal life ==
He was married to Zoe Hacopulos without any issue. He spoke Greek, Turkish and French.
