= Istanbul Greek dialect =

Dialect of modern Greek

- Πολίτικη διάλεκτος Κωνσταντινουπολίτικη διάλεκτος
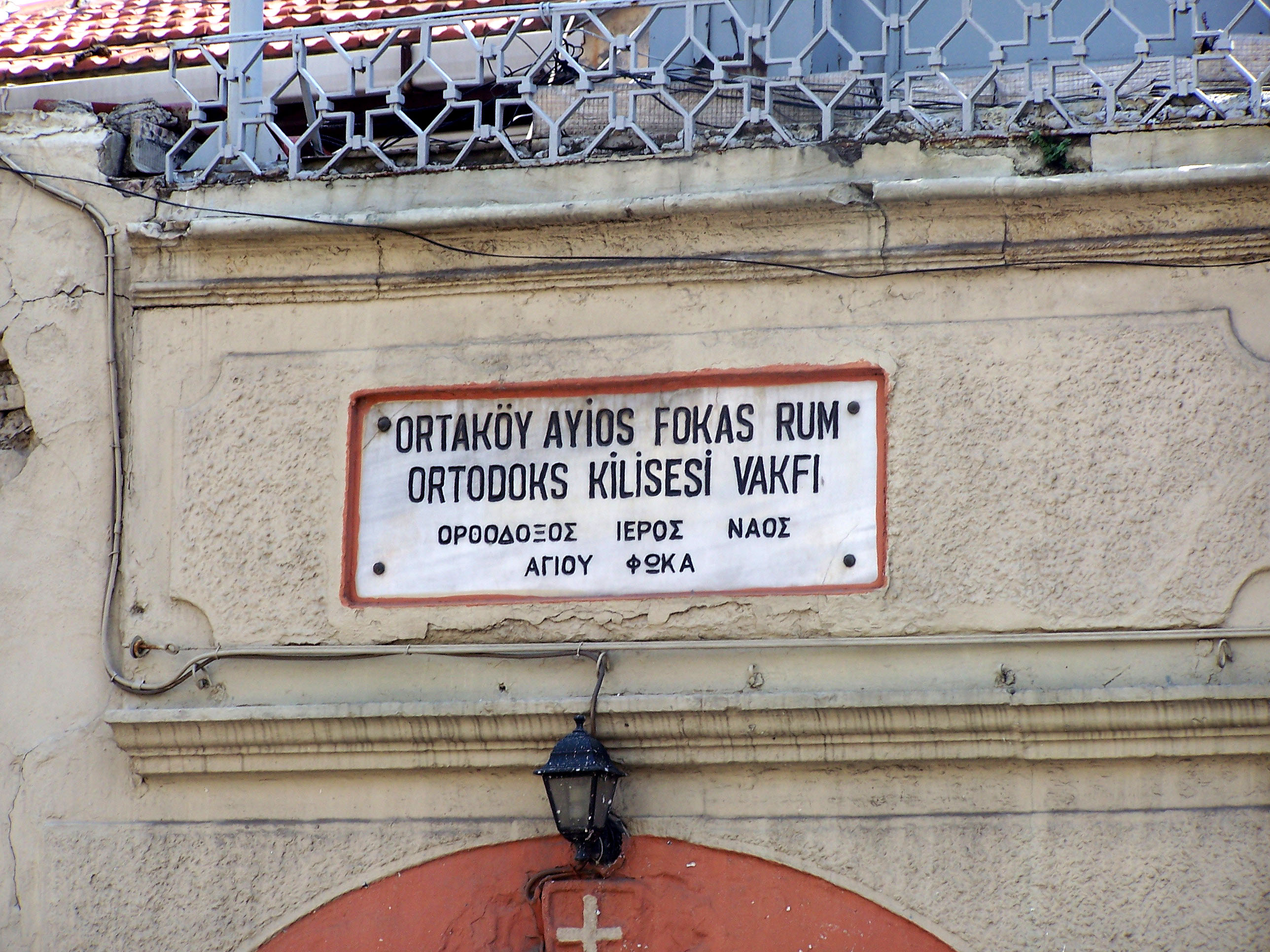
- The Greek Orthodox church of Ayios Fokas in Ortaköy-Beşiktaş, Istanbul with a sign in Turkish and Greek.
- Region: Istanbul, Athens
- Ethnicity: Istanbul Greeks
- Language family: Indo-European: Hellenic; Greek; (disputed); Attic–Ionic; Attic; Koine; Istanbul Greek dialect
- Early forms: Proto-Greek: Ancient Greek; Koine Greek; Medieval Greek
- Writing system: Greek alphabet

Language codes
- ISO 639-3: –
- Glottolog: cons1240 Constantinople Greek
- IETF: el-u-sd-tr34

The Istanbul Greek dialect (Greek: Πολίτικη διάλεκτος or Κωνσταντινουπολίτικη διάλεκτος) is the endangered Greek dialect spoken by the Greek community in Istanbul, which has now shrunk to a couple thousand individuals. It is differentiated from Standard Greek due to a number of internal divergent developments, preservation of characteristics of Ancient Greek that are absent from Standard Greek, and language contact, most notably with Turkish, French, Italian and Armenian. Various characteristics of Istanbul Greek are said to have parallels in Old Athenian Greek, as well as Tsakonian.

The idiom is spoken mainly in Istanbul, and among the Istanbul Greek emigre community in Athens.

== History ==
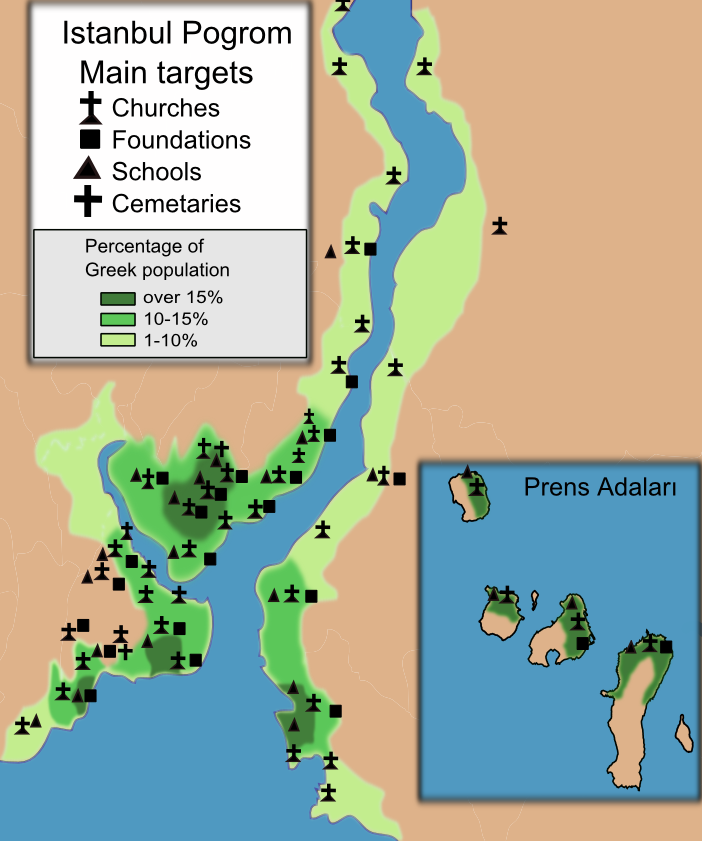
The main targets of the Istanbul pogrom; 6–7 September 1955.

The Istanbul Greek idiom derives from the speech of Istanbul's indigenous Greek community, which, having comprised the majority population before 1453, and 35% of the city's population at the turn of the 20th century, has now shrunk to 0.01% of Istanbul's population, or 2000 individuals.

One of the pivotal moments in the shrinkage of the community was the expulsion of tens of thousand of Istanbul Greeks who held Greek passports in 1964; this also marks the emergence of the Istanbul Greek community in Athens. The features of the dialect have been shaped through a history of interaction with Turks, Armenians, Italians, Franco-Levantines, as well as the maintenance of contact with Standard Greek. Structural changes induced by contact with non-Greek idioms have also occurred. Loanwords in the Istanbul idiom do not tend to be adjusted to typical Greek phonology to the same degree as in Standard Greek. At the same time, Istanbul Greek preserves characteristics that have since been lost in most other Greek dialects. The current Istanbul Greek youth have an identity that has been described as "neither exclusively Greek nor Turk".

=== Classification ===
Among modern Greek dialects, Istanbul Greek generally displays characteristics associated with Northern Greek, rather than Southern Greek, dialects.

Istanbul Greek has historically been ignored in traditional Greek dialectology, or erroneously portrayed as "identical" to Standard Greek because of Constantinople's historical role.

== Phonology ==
As has been demonstrated from articulatory and acoustic analyses, the back vowels in Istanbul Greek are further back than they are in Standard Greek. This resembles the articulation of back vowels in Turkish, and is likely due to a language contact effect arising from the long running contact between Greek and Turkish in the city, dating back to at least 1450.

Also attributed to Turkish contact are the presence of dark L in the dialect, as well as the postalveolar affricates /t͡ʃ/ and /d͡ʒ/. Both features are held to be indexical of Istanbul Greek speech, velar L being more so than /t͡ʃ/.

The postalveolar affricate does occur in other Greek dialects, such as Cypriot Greek; however, it does not elsewhere correspond to Standard Greek /t͡s/ (as Istanbul Greek /t͡ʃ/ does) but instead to palatalized /k/ before front vowels. Likewise, the velarized lateral is a characteristic of Northern Greek speech before back round vowels /o/ and /u/, but not before front vowels, whereas it has been shown to extend to front vowels in the Istanbul dialect.

Among the community of Istanbul Greeks who have moved to Athens, the velar lateral has attained a negative stigmatization as it varies noticeably from Standard Greek, and thus many speakers have stopped using it, although the same has not occurred with /t͡ʃ/; whereas the velar lateral is not common outside of Istanbul among Greek dialects, the postalveolar affricate /t͡ʃ/ is not limited to Istanbul Greeks, and in fact many Standard Greek speakers will also produce it before back round vowels. In Istanbul itself, meanwhile, /t͡ʃ/ is being lost as a distinct phoneme, and it is not considered to be indexical of Istanbul Greek identity.

== Lexicon ==
The lexicon of Istanbul Greek differs from Standard Greek in the preservation of words associated with Ancient Greek more so than the modern form, as well as a wealth of loans from various foreign languages, most notably Turkish, French, Armenian, Italian and English. The lexicon of the dialect is characterized by a much higher rate of borrowing.

== Sociolinguistics ==
The Istanbul Greek dialect is a symbol of Istanbul Greek identity, and may be used as a symbol of community pride. It is a differentiating factor from the Turkish surroundings of its speakers, but also from the Standard Greek they are exposed to. As the Istanbul Greek community has contracted, the community has been exposed to more and more Standard Greek via broadcasts; however, research suggests that although this is having a notable impact on their speech, Istanbul-specific features are being maintained in tandem with positive attitudes toward maintaining the specific Istanbul Greek identity distinct from both the Greeks of Greece, and their Turkish neighbors.

Certain aspects of the dialect have become indexical of this identity. This is particularly the case with the dark L (/ɫ/), which is absent from Standard Greek and viewed as a peculiar characteristic of the speech of Greeks from Istanbul. Various language ideologies may influence its use or non-use today. In Istanbul, the usage of dark L has consciously become associated with community pride. On the other hand, those who try to avoid using it may say they do so in order to preserve the "homogeneity" or unity of the Greek ethnos. Among communities of Istanbul Greek origin in Greece, the use of dark L has been stigmatized and is avoided.

This is less the case with the postalveolar affricate, which is a development which is shared with various other Greek dialects; Istanbul Greeks often preserve usage of the postalveolar affricate even when surrounded by Standard Greek.

== Dialect status ==
=== In Istanbul ===
In Istanbul community members have occasionally been wary due to the vast decrease in the size of the community over the last century, as well as political pressures present today. At the same time, they are proud to use a dialect associated with their community's long history. Some Istanbul Greeks may even assert that their dialect is "more correct" than Standard Greek due to its continuity from Byzantine times, while others believe the Standard Greek is more "correct" (traditionally linguists assert that no dialect can be more "correct" than another and regard prescriptivism as non-scientific).

=== In Athens ===
In communities from Istanbul in Athens, the dialect, like other dialects, has come under pressure from Standard Greek, to which speakers are incentivized to conform. The dialect in Athens is undergoing new changes under the influence of Standard Greek.

== See also ==
- Tsakonian language
- Pontic Greek language
- Cappadocian Greek
- Byzantine Greek
- Language contact
- Adstratum
