= Aşkale labor camp =

Aşkale labor camp was a labor camp established in Aşkale, in Erzurum Province of northeastern Turkey for taxpayers who did not fully and timely pay the extraordinary wealth tax enacted with the 'Varlık vergisi' in Turkey, dated 11 November 1942 and numbered 4305.

The law particularly affected minorities in Turkey. Those who could not pay the determined debts within a month were sent to the labor camps in Aşkale and Erzurum, where they were employed in various jobs. In January 1943, the first convoy went to Aşkale by train for the labor camps to which they would be sent. Due to the number of the first non-Turkic convoys arriving in Aşkale, space problems arose, and the convoys were sent to Erzurum. Some detainees staying in Aşkale and Erzurum were put on freight wagons in August 1943 and sent to Eskişehir. The remaining detainees cleared the snow on the highway in Aşkale. In Erzurum, they prevented the highway from being blocked by snow and swept the streets of the city. More than 20 non-Muslim taxpayers, most of whom were older, died in Erzurum. The wealth tax and enslavers conscription, drew negative reactions from non-Turks and led to widespread criticism both at home and abroad.

== See also ==
- Human rights in Turkey
