= Expulsion of Greeks from Istanbul =

1964–1965 discriminatory measures by the authorities of the Republic of Turkey

- Part of Greek–Turkish relations
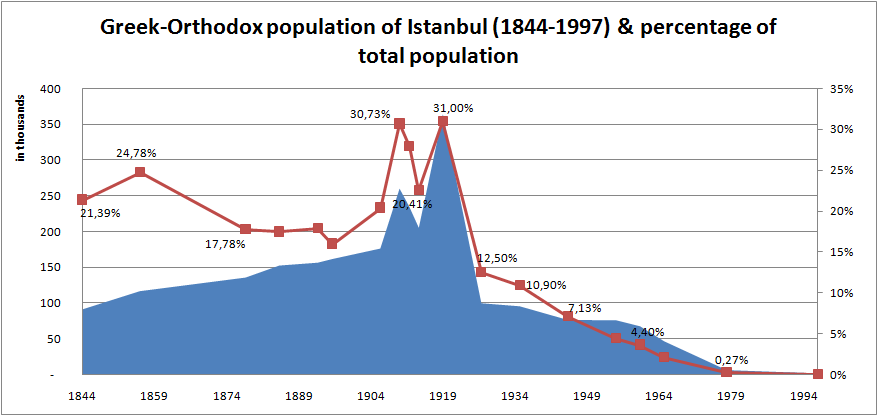
- Greeks in Istanbul (1844–1997)
- Location: Istanbul, Turkey
- Date: March 1964–1965
- Target: Greeks in Istanbul
- Attack type: Forced expulsion, deportation, ethnic cleansing
- Deaths: 60+
- Victim: The Greek community of Istanbul was reduced from approximately 80,000 to about 30,000.
- Perpetrators: İsmet İnönü, Government of Turkey under the Republican People's Party (CHP)

The expulsion of Greeks from Istanbul was an ethno-religious cleansing campaign undertaken by İsmet İnönü's CHP-led government of Turkey in 1964–1965.

The Turkish government, then led by the Republican People's Party (CHP), enacted a series of measures in 1964–1965 that resulted in a dramatic decrease in the number of Greeks in Istanbul. It marked the culmination of earlier discriminatory policies and episodes of anti-Greek violence, including the "wealth tax" of 1942 and the anti-Greek pogrom of September 1955.

The Greeks of Istanbul were initially excluded from the Greek–Turkish population exchange of 1923 and were allowed to remain in the city. During the 1950s and 1960s, the Greek minority was used as an apparatus of pressure for the Cyprus issue as part of the Greek–Turkish relations. The anti-Greek measures of 1964–1965 resulted in a drastic reduction in the number of Greeks in Istanbul. As such, from a population of about 80,000 only about 30,000 remained in 1965. The measures also resulted in the appropriation of minority-owned properties by the Turkish state and were accompanied by restrictions in the fields of religion and education. The expulsion during this period was part of the final phase of state measures aimed at the Turkification of the local economic, social, and cultural life.

== Background ==
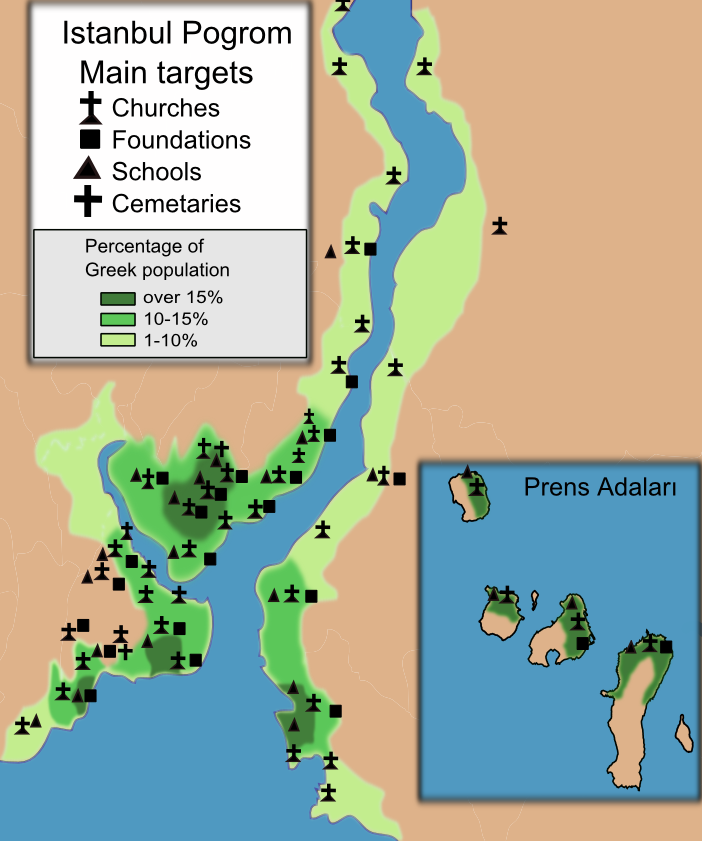
Percentage of Greek minority in Istanbul (1955) and the main targets of Istanbul pogrom

A long-term policy of ethno-religious cleansing and Turkification of the economy was implemented from 1908 by the local Ottoman authorities. Such tendencies continued after the Greek–Turkish population exchange of 1923 against the remaining Greek communities, exemplified in the "wealth" tax of 1942 and the pogrom of 1955. (Note: Although Greek Orthodox Christians were the primary targets of the 1955 mob violence, Armenians and Jews were also amongst the indirect non-Muslim targets and also suffered from the violence although arguably not to the same degree.)

Following the 1955 pogrom, the Turkish government used the local Greek minority in Istanbul as a tool of pressure for the Cyprus issue. As part of this context, Turkey decided again to use the Greeks of Istanbul in the early 1960s, while the government of İsmet İnönü and the local press launched a campaign for the justification of the premeditated expulsion of Istanbul Greeks.

From 1963 Turkey found itself in diplomatic isolation while NATO and CENTO, organizations in which it was a member, refused to support the Turkish claims for Cyprus. On 16 March 1964, Turkey unilaterally denounced the Greek–Turkish Convention of Establishment, Commerce and Navigation of 1930, marking the beginning of a massive Greek exodus. Though Turkish authorities initially claimed that the expulsions were directed towards specific individuals who displayed activities "dangerous to the internal and external security of Turkey", the Turkish government spokesperson, Mümtaz Soysal, later admitted that:

Unless the Greek government changed its attitude in regard to the question of Cyprus, all the Greek nationals in Istanbul might be expelled en masse.

== Population affected ==
The measures immediately affected more than 10,000 ethnic Greeks who held Greek passports and were allowed to remain in Turkey under the terms of the Treaty of Lausanne (1923), the subsequent Greek–Turkish population exchange, as well as the Greek–Turkish agreement of 1930. Those Greeks, though holding Greek passports, lived in Istanbul before 1918 and their descendants were born in Turkey but had acquired Greek citizenship; some of them had never been in Greece before. Nevertheless, with Turkey's unilateral abrogation, they were obliged to leave the country immediately. Since many had married co-ethnics who had Turkish citizenship, this exodus inevitably affected a much higher number.

The first wave of expulsion included businessmen and in general members of the community supposed to have conducted activities detrimental to the Turkish state. On 24 March 1964, the first list of Greek deportees was published in Turkish newspapers and five days later the expulsion of the first families took place. During the following months (April–August 1964), about 5,000 expulsions occurred, while another 10,000–11,000 Greeks were expelled after September 1964. On 11 October 1964, the Turkish newspaper Cumhuriyet reported that 30,000 Turkish nationals of Greek descent had also left permanently. In total, the Greek community of Istanbul was reduced from approximately 80,000 to about 30,000 in 1965 as a result of this state campaign of massive expulsion.

Among those expelled were several distinguished businessmen in long-established commercial institutions that provided employment to both Greeks and Turks. As a result of the expulsions, about 100 businesses had to close down. The state authorities also expelled – allegedly due to anti-Turkish activity – handicapped and disabled persons as well as people with mental illness and individuals who suffered from incurable diseases; even people who had died some years before.

== Restrictions ==
=== Fundamental human rights violations ===
The deportees were informed of their expulsion order by police officers either at their homes or workplaces. They were then transferred to the "Greek Department" at the police headquarters of Istanbul and forced to sign a document in which they had to admit to a number of charges as well as that they "...consented to leave Turkey of their own will". They were allowed to take only 220 Turkish lira (approximately US$22) with them, as well as a single piece of luggage weighing 20 kilograms (710 oz) or less. They were prohibited from taking away items made of valuable materials such as gold and silver.

The expulsions were also aimed at confiscating the property of those expelled. A Turkish ministerial decree prohibited all Greeks from conducting transactions involving their houses or any other property, and their bank accounts were blocked. Banks were also instructed to refuse any loans to businesses entirely or partly owned by Greeks. Another ministerial decree ordered the seizure of all real estate property and bank accounts belonging to Greek citizens, while all Greek citizens were prohibited from acquiring property in Turkey.

=== Anti-Greek campaign in the press ===
The Greek community was widely targeted by the Turkish press as a potential enemy of the state and "exploiter" of the Turkish economy. Wide-scale use of aggressive language and hate speech against Greeks was quite typical in contemporary Turkish media, which promoted the concept that the expulsions were conducted to avoid imminent dangers for the Turkish nation. Typical headlines in the Turkish press referred to Greeks as "genetically flawed and ruthless blood-shedders" and "the evil, historical enemy of Turks". Turkish newspapers frequently printed lists and charts with the names, professions, and personal details of those who were to be expelled, thereby making them open targets and victims of lynching campaigns by fanatical mobs.

On 14 April 1964, Turkish student organizations joined this anti-Greek campaign. Their common declaration was published on the front cover of almost all Istanbul newspapers:

Great Turkish Nation: keeping in mind that each lira they earn by exploiting you, will turn out to be arms directed at your brethren in Cyprus, the best thing you can do in the service of Turkishhood is to cut off all business with those exploiting us economically . . . . In this period of economic warfare, if you do not wish to be the slaves of world nations, become a volunteer in this campaign.

=== Persecution of religion and education ===
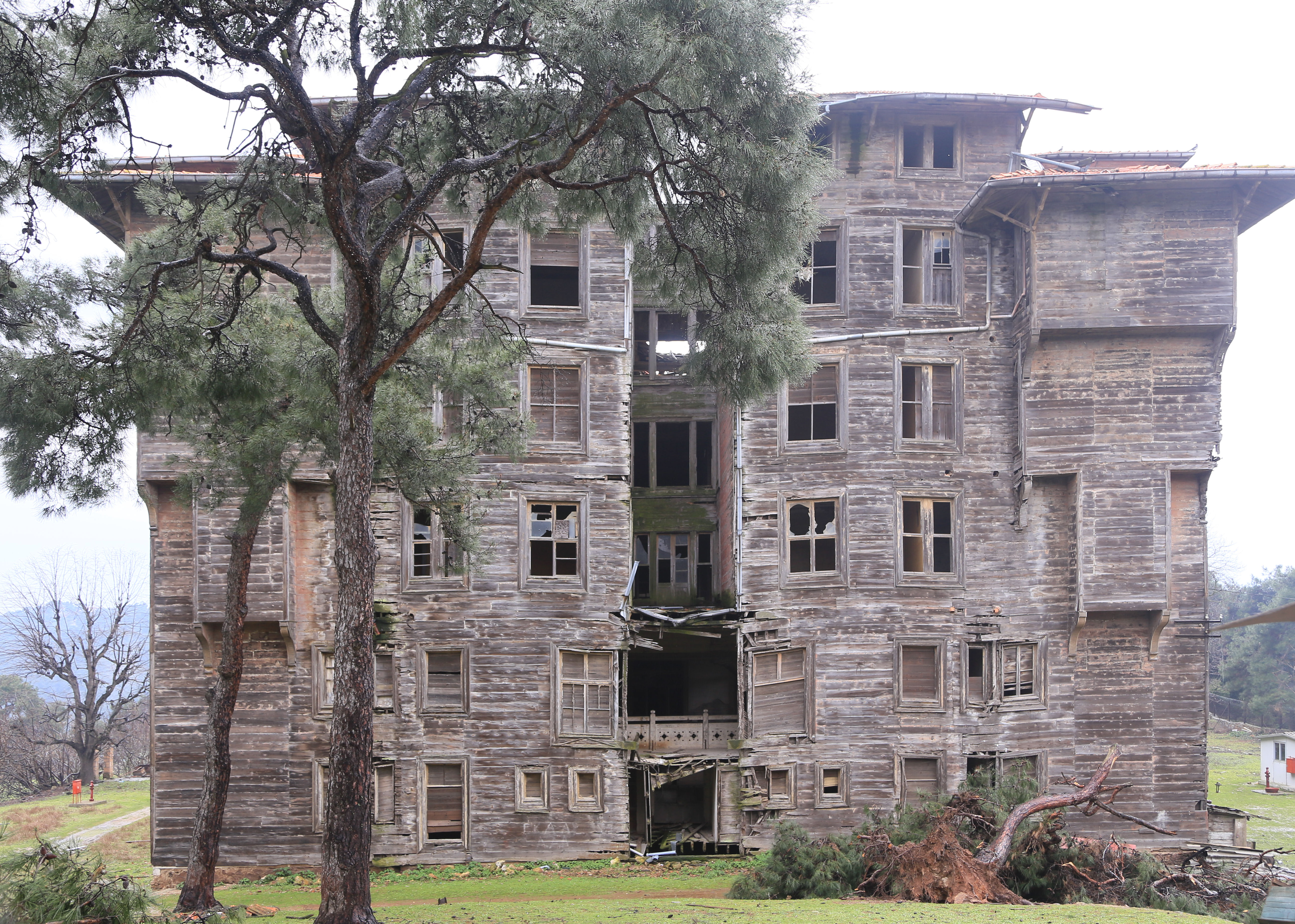
The Prinkipo Greek Orphanage (picture of 2015) was forced to cease functioning as a result of the state measures of 1964.

The Greek-Orthodox Church and in particular the local Ecumenical Patriarchate of Constantinople were also targeted by the authorities and the press, being typically described as an "unwelcomed residue of Greek influence" in Turkey. The printing house of the Patriarchate – in operation since 1672 – was closed down after the police cancelled its license to operate and then cited a new 1964 law stating that "only persons and legal entities can have printing houses", whilst many Turkish newspapers claimed that its function was a supposed infringement of the Treaty of Lausanne. Its religious publications were banned. Meanwhile, high-ranking priests were immediately expelled due to allegations of involvement in subversive "political, administrative, educational and social activities", while all non-Turkish nationals who attended the Greek Orthodox Halki Seminary were expelled from Turkey. The theology department of the seminary was closed down in 1971.

Greek Orthodox clerics were prohibited from entering local Greek schools. In November 1964, the morning prayer was banned from Greek schools. The Turkish government also began refusing permission for the repair of dilapidated educational institutions. In contravention of the Lausanne Treaty, Greek elementary and secondary schools had to accept the appointment of Turkish assistant headmasters. On 15 September 1964, the authorities prohibited all books written in Greek inside the Greek schools of Istanbul and their libraries. Religious celebrations, including Christmas and Easter, were also forbidden inside schools. From December 1964, Greek pupils were prohibited from speaking Greek during class breaks. On 21 April 1964, the local authorities forcibly occupied and closed the Greek Orphanage of Büyükada (Prinkipos), thus depriving 165 orphans of their lodgings and education.

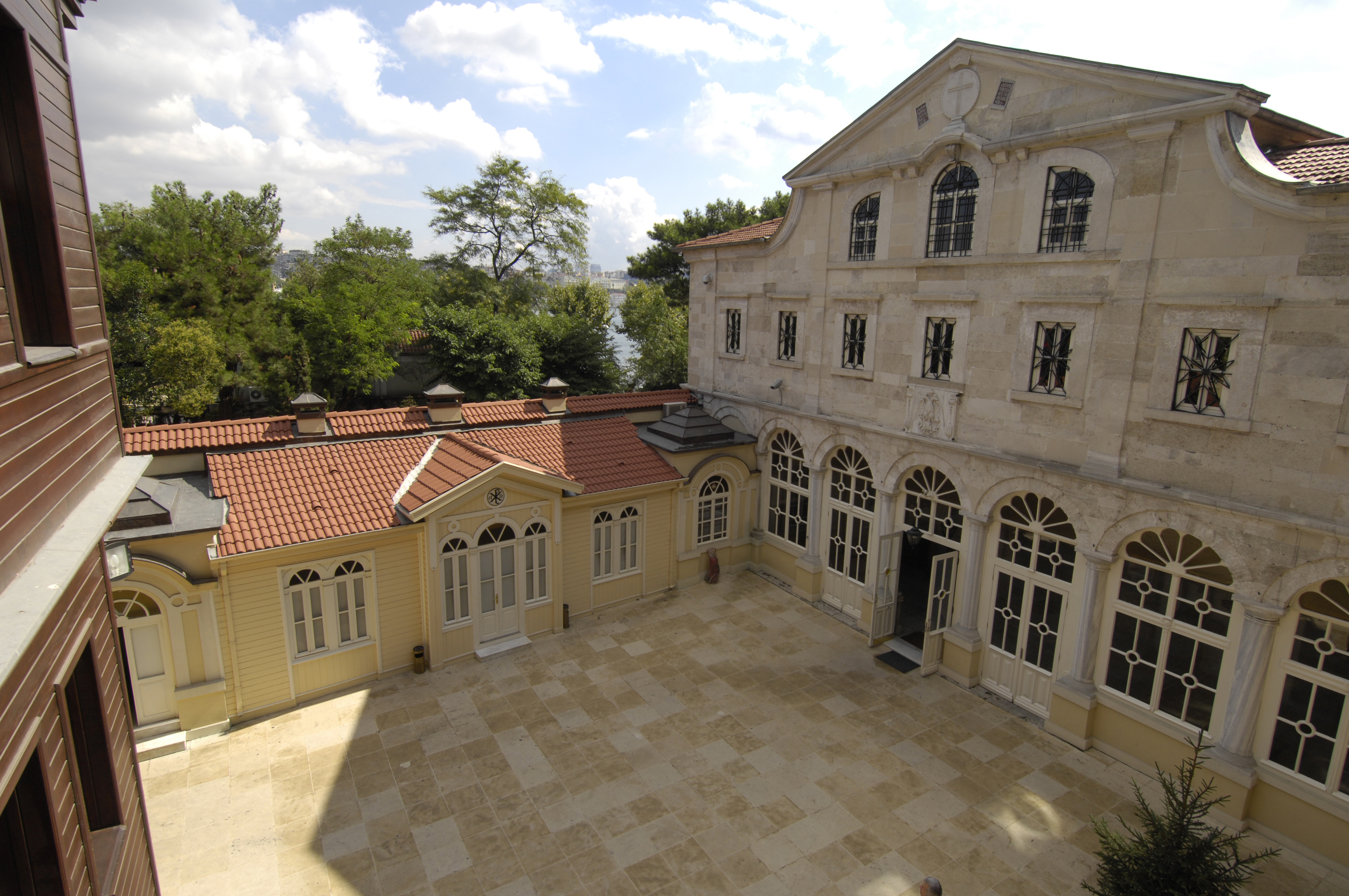
The complex of the Ecumenical Partiarchate was targeted by Turkish mobs in various instances in 1964–1965, as well as several Orthodox churches in Istanbul.

Throughout this period, there were several incidents and attacks against Church property. In various instances, Turkish mobs attacked the Patriarchate and other religious monuments. In one case, on 9 September 1964, the Greek cemetery at Kuzguncuk was desecrated. The British Consul in Istanbul reported that:

he [the Patriarch] and his hierarchy, his churches, schools and seminaries, were continually subjected to vexatious harassments, sometimes of a major kind. None of his buildings are, for instance, allowed to be repaired or rebuilt

== Reactions outside Turkey ==
As the expulsion policy became wide-scale the Greek government asked for an emergency meeting of the United Nations Security Council in September 1964. The president of the council, Platon D. Morozov, as well as the Soviet Union, condemned the "massive deportations". However, Western countries preferred to avoid any involvement against the ongoing expulsion policy.

== Aftermath ==
The exodus of Istanbul Greeks indicated that the coexistence of Muslims and Greek Orthodox in Istanbul, which had survived for centuries, that was ratified under the terms of the Treaty of Lausanne, had completely failed. The expulsion had multiple and complex repercussions for Turkey in the fields of both domestic and foreign policy. It also struck a blow to the concept of a pluralistic society, in a country that would tolerate the presence of the remaining non-Muslim element. On the other hand, it fuelled nationalist agitation and fervor in both Greece and Turkey, and further deteriorated Greek–Turkish relations.

Those expelled found refuge mainly in Greece. In 1965 the "Society of the Greeks expelled from Turkey" was founded in Athens by prominent members of their diaspora. The exodus continued during the subsequent years with additional thousands of local Greeks leaving Istanbul in fear of losing their lives and property.

The ban on Greeks selling their property in Turkey was finally lifted in 1989 by Prime Minister Turgut Özal. This occurred after pressure was exerted by the Council of the European Union in the context of Turkey's application for membership in the European Union. However, the state authorities in Turkey were still imposing restrictions and appropriating minority properties through similar legal processes, and continued to refuse to allow Greek citizens to possess or inherit any kind of property. Similarly, donations by members of the Greek minority to non-Muslim minority institutions were considered the property of the Turkish state.

As a result of such policies of Turkification, several parts of Istanbul that had been predominantly inhabited by minorities were evacuated during the 1950s and 1960s and were fully abandoned and filled with decaying buildings. Some of them were subsequently occupied by rural migrants who finally achieved ownership after a certain time period of uncontested occupation. Other were sold with unclear legal processes. Today Istanbul has lost most of its multicultural character.

== See also ==
- Imbros
- Tenedos
- Confiscation of Armenian properties in Turkey

== Sources ==
- Alexandris, Alexis (1983). The Greek Minority of Istanbul and Greek–Turkish Relations, 1918–1974. Center for Asia Minor Studies.
- Arat, Zehra F. Kabasakal (January 2011). Human Rights in Turkey. University of Pennsylvania Press. ISBN 978-0-8122-0114-7.
- Kaliber, Alper (2019). "Re-engaging the Self/other Problematic in Post-positivist International Relations: The 1964 Expulsion of Greeks from Istanbul Revisited". Southeast European and Black Sea Studies. 19 (3): 365–386. doi:10.1080/14683857.2019.1651082. ISSN 1468-3857. S2CID 201349840.
- Mills, Amy (2010). Streets of Memory: Landscape, Tolerance, and National Identity in Istanbul. University of Georgia Press. ISBN 9780820335735.
- Niarchos, Georgios (2005). Between Ethnicity, Religion and Politics Foreign Policy and the Treatment of Minorities in Greece and Turkey, 1923–1974 (Thesis). London School of Economics and Political Science. doi:10.12681/eadd/19135. hdl:10442/hedi/19135.
