= Sait Çetinoğlu =

- Born: Turkey
- Occupations: Historian, writer
- Known for: Research on minorities and political history

Ali Sait Çetinoğlu is a Turkish historian, genocide scholar and Professor of the Free University Ankara Independent Initiative, Turkey. He was one of the first representatives and coordinators for Turkey at the Amnesty International. His interests include The Young Turks and Kemalism, the Armenian genocide and following actions that targeted 'Other' in Turkey: the anti-Jewish pogroms in Thrace in 1934, the intimidation campaign “Citizen, speak Turkish!” and the mobilisation of work battalions for the 'minorities' during 1941-42. Cetinoglu has published original articles based on research of the National Archives in Turkey.

Çetinoğlu is an author of The Malta Documents and Economic and Cultural Genocide, 1942-1944 books, published by Belge Press in Istanbul), The List of Murderers of Zaven Patriarch: the Biographies of Genocide Perpetrators (Peri Publishing House), From Ittihatism to Kemalism: Minorities in Turkey co-authored with Fikret Başkaya (Ozgur University). He is also a co-author of the Dictionary of Concepts and the Official Ideology dictionary published by Ozgur University. He worked in the field of human rights at the Ozgur Universite, Association of Protection of Human Rights and Amnesty International. He is an organising member of the Ankara Freedom of Thought Initiative that hosted the “1915 Within Its Pre-and Post-Historical Periods: Denial and Confrontation” conference in Ankara on 24 April 2010. He is the founder of the Free University system of Turkey, which publishes brochures presenting the Turkish history.

On 24 April 2013 Çetinoğlu, along with 9 other Turkish intellectuals, visited the Armenian Genocide Memorial to pay tribute to the memory of the innocent victims.

His articles are published in such journals and newspapers, as Le Monde, Agos, Birgün, Evrensel, Newroz and Radikal.

== Links ==
- Turkish Intellectuals Who Have Recognized The Armenian Genocide: Sait Çetinoglu
- Foundations of non-Muslim Communities: The Last Object of Confiscation ( by Sait Çetinoğlu)
