= Bible translations into Turkish =

The first translations of the Bible into Turkish date back to the 17th century, yet the first printed edition did not appear until the early 19th century. In more recent history, there has been a significant increase in the quality and quantity of translations.

== Old translation ==
The Bible was first translated into Ottoman Turkish in the 17th century by Wojciech Bobowski, a Polish convert to Islam. He is more commonly known as Ali Ufki/Bey, as well as his latin penname, Albertus Bobovius. Ali Ufki worked with a Dutch group undertaking language translations of the Bible coordinated by John Amos Comenius and Levinus Warner. While it is agreed amongst scholars Ali Ufki had likely completed his translation prior to 1666, the completed version remained an unpublished manuscript for over 150 years; the New Testament from his manuscript was first printed in Paris in 1819, then revised and printed with the Old Testament in 1827.

An English chaplain named William Seaman completed and published a translation of the New Testament into Ottoman Turkish in 1666. This translation was organised and partly commissioned by Robert Boyle. Boyle and Seaman worked distantly with the literary team organising Ali Ufki's translation in Holland, with Henry Oldenburg keeping communication between the two projects. Oldenburg had hoped to unite the two projects, with Ali Ufki and William Seaman undertaking the Old and New Testament respectively, however this did not come to pass, as, amongst other difficulties, particular strains on their collaboration arose with the death of Warner in 1665. Seaman's translation holds the title of the oldest printed and published Turkic translation of the New Testament.

While William Seaman's translation of the Bible holds a significant place in literary history as the first book to be printed entirely in Turkish, contemporaries of his time (Ali Ufki included) and scholarly critics note the many errors and syntax difficulties present in his work. Comenius stated, “The errors of the translation are apparently rustic and barbarous; not one of the more educated Turks will be able to read it."

Seaman's translation has fallen out of favour with modern critics, who note more typical seventeenth-century Turkish in Ali Ufki's translation. For example, in translating the word "said", Seaman's use of the archaic "eyitdi" instead of "söyledi" or "dedi" is rarely found in Ali Ufki's version.

A new translation was published in Constantinople in 1878 and entitled Kitab-ı Mukaddes ("Holy Book"). Revised several times, this was the only Bible in the Arabic alphabet of Ottoman Turkish that stayed in print until the end of the Ottoman period.

In addition, Armeno-Turkish and Graeco-Turkish Bibles were produced in the Turkish spoken by these Ottoman minority peoples and written in their very different alphabets.

Seraphim Khojentzi translated the New Testament which was published by the Russian Bible Society in 1819. This edition used Armenian script.

== Modern translations ==
Following Mustafa Kemal Atatürk's orthographic reforms in 1928, a new translation/translation revision, this time written in the Latin script-based new Turkish alphabet was published in 1941. The language continued to change as Turkish removed many foreign words (especially of Arabic or Persian origin). In just sixty years, the language went through the equivalent of three hundred years of changes, thus many foreign words found in the old Turkish Bible were no longer used.

Because of this the United Bible Society and the Translation Trust joined together to produce a translation suited to the new language. This work is a colloquial version. The translators included Ali Şimşek, Behnan Konutgan and Mahmud Solgun. The translation consultants included the Rev. Dr. Manuel Jinbachian and Dr. Krijn van der Jagt. In 1989 the New Testament was published, one journalist saying the work "flows like music." The New Testament edition is called İNCİL: İncil'in Çağdaş Türkçe Çevirisi. The complete Bible was dedicated on October 21, 2001. It has the title, KUTSAL KİTAP Yeni Çeviri / Eski ve Yeni Antlaşma (Tevrat, Zebur, İncil).

A Turkish translation of the New Testament into simplified language was published in 2012, with the title, Halk Dilinde İncil: Sadeleştirilmiş İncil Tercümesi. The publication was launched at a reception at the Prestige Elite Hotel in Istanbul. The publisher is called Yeni Yaşam Yayınları, which translates in English as New Life Publications.

In 2011, an organization published a Turkish translation of the Gospel of Matthew, which used a paraphrase methodology. This was part of a wider controversy that arose among several mission agencies during 2012 with regard to how to translate certain words and phrases at the heart of Christian belief.

Thomas Cosmades translated the New Testament into Turkish. It was published in 1997 and 1998 by the Turkish Bible Society. A new revision of his translation was published in 2010 by Kutsal Söz Yayınları.

Jehovah's Witnesses released a translation of the Bible in the Turkish language based on the 1984 edition of the English language New World Translation of the Holy Scriptures (Kutsal Kitap Yeni Dünya Çevirisi) in 2008.

== Style comparison ==
Translation	John (Yuhanna) 3:16	John (Yuhanna) 3:16 (Ottoman Turkish)
Ali Bey Manuscript - 1665 (transcribed)	Zira Allah Teâlâ alemi ta o kadar sevdi ki kendi Biricik Oğlunu ihsan eyledi ta ki O'na iman getiren helâk olmaya illâ ebeden hayy ola.	زیرا الله تعالی عالمی تا او قدر سودیكه كندو برجق اوغلنی احسان ایلدی تا که اكا ایمان کتورن هلاك اولمیه
Ali Bey/ Kieffer - 1819 (transcribed)	Zira Allah Teâlâ alemi o kadar sevdi ki kendi Biricik Oğlunu verdi ta ki O'na iman getiren helâk olmaya amma ebeden hayy ola.	
Kieffer - 1827 (transcribed)	Zira Allah dünyayı şöyle sevdi ki kendi Biricik Oğlunu verdi ta ki her O'na inanan helak olmaya amma ebedi hayata malik ola.	
Türabi/Redhouse 1857 (transcribed)	Zira Allah dünyayı şöyle sevdi ki kendi Yegâne Oğlunu verdi ta ki her O'na iman eden helak olmaya illâ ebedi hayata malik ola.	
Selim/Schauffler 1866 (transcribed)	Zira Allah dünyayı şöyle sevdi ki her O'na iman eden helak olmayıp ancak hayat-ı ebediyeye mâlik ola diye kendi İbn-i Vahîdini ita eyledi.	
Kitab-ı Mukaddes - 1886 (transcribed)	Zira Allah dünyayı bu kadar sevdi ki kendi İbn-i Vahîdini verdi ta ki O'na her iman eden helak olmayıp ancak ebedi hayata malik ola.	
Kitab-ı Mukaddes - 1941 (KM)	Zira Allah dünyayı öyle sevdi ki, biricik Oğlunu verdi; ta ki ona iman eden her adam helâk olmasın, ancak ebedi hayatı olsun.	
YYY Müjde (1987)	“Çünkü Tanrı dünyayı o kadar çok sevdi ki, biricik Oğlu’nu verdi. Öyle ki, O’na iman edenlerin hiçbiri mahvolmasın, ama hepsi sonsuz yaşama kavuşsun.	
Thomas Cosmades -1997 TC97	Çünkü Tanrı dünyayı o denli sevdi ki, biricik Oğlu’nu verdi. Öyle ki, her kim O’na iman ederse yok olmasın, sonsuz yaşama kavuşsun.	
Bünyamin Candemir - 2003 (CAN)	Çünkü Allah dünyayı öyle sevdi ki, biricik doğmuş olan Oğlu’nu verdi; öyle ki, O’na iman eden herkes mahvolmasın, ama sonsuz hayatı olsun.	
Yeni Çeviri (YC2009)	“Çünkü Tanrı dünyayı o kadar çok sevdi ki, biricik Oğlu’nu verdi. Öyle ki, O’na iman edenlerin hiçbiri mahvolmasın, hepsi sonsuz yaşama kavuşsun.	
Thomas Cosmades - 2010 (TC)	Çünkü Tanrı dünyayı o denli sevdi ki, biricik Oğlu’nu verdi. Öyle ki, her kim O’na iman ederse mahvolmasın, sonsuz yaşama kavuşsun.	
Halk Dilinde İncil - 2012 (HADİ)	Allah dünyayı öyle çok sevdi ki, biricik semavî Oğlu'nu feda etti. Öyle ki, O'na iman eden helâk olmasın, ebedî hayata kavuşsun.	
İncil'in Temel Türkçe Tercümesi (2020)	Çünkü Allah dünyayı o kadar sevdi ki, biricik Oğlu'nu verdi. Öyle ki, her kim O'na iman ederse mahvolmasın ama sonsuz yaşama kavuşsun.	
Kutsal Kitap. Yeni Dünya Çevirisi (2008)	Tanrı dünyayı öyle sevdi ki, biricik oğlunu verdi; ona iman eden hiç kimse yok olmasın, hepsi sonsuz yaşama sahip olsun diye bunu yaptı.	
