= Yannis Vasilis =

Turkish activist of Greek descent

Yannis Vasilis Yaylalı
- Born: İbrahim Yaylalı
- Occupations: Soldier; activist
- Known for: Activism against persecution of minorities in Turkey

Yannis Vasilis Yaylalı, born İbrahim Yaylalı, is a former Turkish nationalist, turned Turkish-Greek pacifist and activist, promoting and defending Greek heritage in Turkey. An avowed Turkish nationalist, he joined the Turkish army in 1994 to fight the PKK insurgency. Taken captive, his family requested governmental help for his release, which was declined on the basis of Yaylalı's Greek heritage. Eventually discovering his family's actual Pontic Greek origin, recent conversion to Islam, and nationalistic turn, in 2013 he changed his name to the Greek, Yannis Vasilis Yaylalı. Following the discovery of his Greek ancestry, Yaylalı converted to Eastern Orthodox Christianity.

Yaylalı was arrested on April 22, 2017, for commemorating online the early 20th century genocides of Greeks and Armenians that same day. The three charges brought against him were for "insulting the President", "inciting people to disobey laws" and "spreading propaganda for a terrorist organization". Yaylalı has been a notable activist among hidden Greeks, encouraging Turks to dig into their family's history, and revive their links to their Greek heritage. He was released in 2018, and immigrated to Greece in 2019.

In 2021, Yaylalı commented on Turkey's new military campaign in the neighboring Iraqi Kurdistan. He said that this was a war against the Kurds, not the PKK. He recalled the approach of the Turkish state against the Kurds during the 1990s, and stated "We have harmed Kurdish villages in the past quite badly. The villages were burned down. The villagers have been kidnapped and tortured" and added, "But today is much bigger than the 1990s. They now target a community to change the demographics as a whole, and not just in North, but in all parts of Kurdistan."

In 2023, Yaylalı brought his case to Turkey's courts in order to formally change his name from Turkish Yaylalı to Greek Parharidis, which he says "is a common last name among Pontic Greeks, an autochthonous people of the Black Sea coast whose numbers have since diminished due to assimilation and massacres under the Ottoman Empire and Turkey." While name change to foreign names is not legal in Turkey, Yaylalı argues "that a Greek surname cannot be considered as foreign, as the definition of 'foreigner' cannot include citizens with minority ethnic or religious identities."
