= Nilüfer Verdi =

Turkish jazz pianist (born 1956)

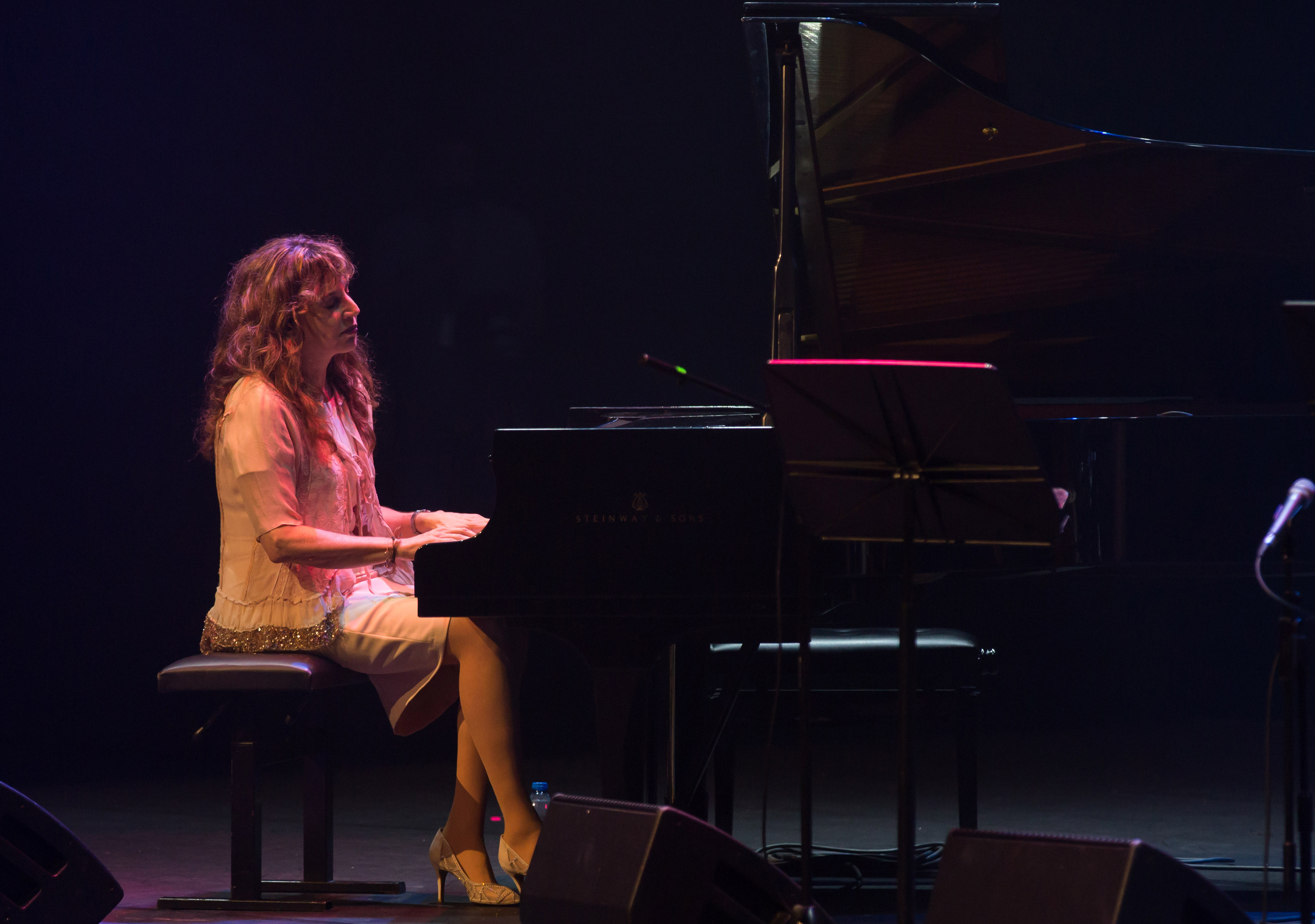
- Nilüfer Verdi (June 2018)

Background information
- Born: Nilüfer Ruacan Verdi; 1956 (age 69–70); Istanbul, Turkey
- Genres: Jazz
- Occupation: Musician
- Instrument: Piano

Nilüfer Ruacan Verdi (born 1956) is a Turkish jazz pianist; she is the first female jazz pianist in Turkey.

== Personal life ==
Nilüfer Verdi was born into a family of musicians in Istanbul, Turkey, in 1956. Her father Nejat Verdi, whose ancestors were Cretan emigrants, was a percussionist, her mother Liselotte "Lilo" Auer Verdi was a painter and her older brother Murat Verdi is a drummer.

Verdi became interested in music at a young age. She began taking piano lessons and continued with them into her high-school years. After attending Özel Eseniş Lisesi, a private high school in Arnavutköy, Istanbul, she moved to the United States to study music and took lessons in piano, harmony, arrangement and musical composition. She was educated at the Juilliard School in New York City, and by notable American pianists including Jack Reilly at The New School in New York City, and Ray Santisi, Bob Winter and Billie Pierce at Berklee College of Music in Boston.

Verdi married jazz guitarist Neşet Ruacan, whom she had met in Istanbul, in New York City in 1978. In 1979, she gave birth to her only son, Nedim Ruacan, who would later become a percussionist. The couple divorced in 1999.

== Career ==
Nilüfer Verdi is the first female jazz pianist in Turkey. She has played with many local and foreign musicians in jazz clubs and festivals in Turkey and abroad, including Akbank, Yapı Kredi, Bilsak, Boğaziçi, Kuşadası, Istanbul (2009), Afyonkarahisar (2007) and Houston, CanAm and Port Heron. She performed at a 28-day tour of the People's Republic of China.

In 1997, Verdi released her first CD album Mânâ ("Meaning" or "Explanation"), an instrumental jazz album, through the record label Ada Müzik. Verdi composed seven of the nine tracks, played the piano and was accompanied by her spouse, Neşet Ruacan on the guitar, John Ormondon on bass guitar and Ari Hoenig on drums.

Her second album İZhar ("Disclose") was released by A.K. Müzik in 2007. Nine of the ten tracks are instrumental while the last track "Unutmayın" ("Don't Forget") was written to commemorate the death of her son's paternal aunt Nükhet Ruacan the same year. Verdi played piano and was accompanied by Kamil Özler on the guitar, Kağan Yıldız on the double bass and her son Nedim Ruacan on drums. The album features musical arrangements including "Kara Toprak" ("Black Soil") by Turkish folk poet Âşık Veysel (1894–1973), the 1938-ballad "Prelude to a Kiss by Duke Ellington, "Oggigiorno" by Franco Cerri and "Mrs. Waterlilly" by Kamil Özler.

In 2016, Verdi released her third CD, a six-track album called Knidost, through Ada Müzik. The album features her arrangements of Turkish folk music from türküs of Anatolian ashiks, including Âşık Veysel and Neşet Ertaş (1938–2012) as well as the popular Istanbul folk song "Kâtibim", which was sung by Ülkü Aybala Sunat with Verdi on piano and Apostolos Sideris on double bass.

Verdi performs in her own band Nilüfer Verdi Jazz Trio, which consists of Verdi on piano with Apostolos Sideris on bass and Turgut Alp Bekoğlu on drums.

== Gender equality ideas ==
Nilüfer Verdi dedicated her first two albums to women. She justified her decision with "All over the world, negative discrimination is being applied against women that is not suitable for the century we live in. I wanted to emphasize that the blessings of civilization should be available to all genders. It is really difficult to explain the women's perspective to men." Referring to her son, she said; "I did not apply to my son the privileges that families give to boys. He also grew up among successful women, who showed themselves in social life." She added; "the paternal grandaunt of my son, Melahat Ruacan, was the first female member of the Court of Cassation, his paternal aunt Nükhet Ruacan (1951–2007) was a notable jazz singer, his maternal grandmother Liselotte Auer a painter and his paternal grandmother Ümran Ruacan was a Morse code telegraphist."

== Discography ==
- Mânâ (Ada Müzik, 1997)
- İzhar (A.K. Müzik, 2007)
- Knidost (Ada Müzik, 2016)
