= V'iacheslav Kostanda =

Ukrainian water polo player (born 1963)

Personal information
- Nationality: Ukrainian
- Born: 17 May 1963 (age 61); Zhdanov, Ukrainian SSR, Soviet Union

Sport
- Sport: Water polo

V'iacheslav Kostanda (born 17 May 1963) is a Ukrainian water polo player. He competed in the men's tournament at the 1996 Summer Olympics.
