= Prinkipo Greek Orthodox Orphanage =

Prinkipo Greek Orphanage
- Turkish: Prinkipo Rum Yetimhanesi
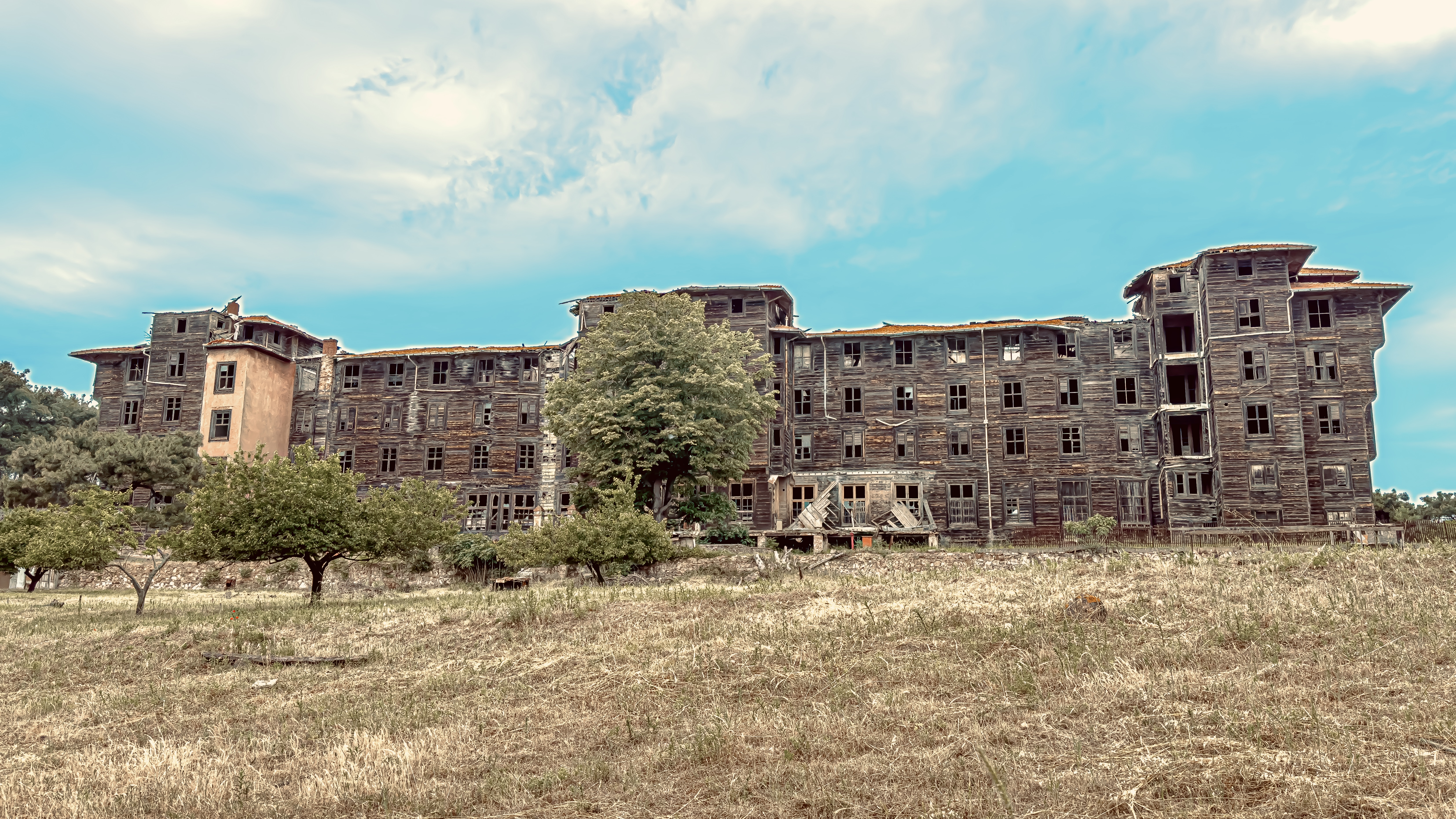
- Prinkipo Greek Orphanage in 2024
- Alternative names: Prinkipo Environmental Center

General information
- Type: Hotel, Orphanage
- Location: Büyükada, Adalar, Turkey
- Coordinates: 40°51′39″N 29°07′24″E
- Current tenants: Prinkipo Environmental Center
- Construction started: 1898
- Inaugurated: May 21, 1903
- Client: Prinkipo Environmental Center
- Landlord: Ecumenical Patriarchate of Constantinople

Technical details
- Structural system: Wooden

Design and construction
- Architect: Alexander Vallaury

The Prinkipo Greek Orphanage (Turkish: Prinkipo Rum Yetimhanesi, also known as Prinkipo Palace or Büyükada Greek Orphanage) is a historic 20,000-square-meter wooden building on Büyükada, one of the nine Princes' Islands off the coast of Istanbul, Turkey, in the Sea of Marmara. It is considered the largest wooden building in Europe and second largest in the world. It served as an orphanage from 1903 to 1964.

== History ==
It was designed and constructed in 1898 by the French-Ottoman architect Alexander Vallaury as a luxury hotel and casino, named Prinkipo Palace, for the Compagnie Internationale des Wagons-Lits, the European passenger train company that operated the Orient Express. However, it never opened as a hotel. In 1903, after Sultan Abdul Hamid II refused to grant an operating permit, the building was sold to Eleni Zarifi (Greek: Ελένη Ζαρίφη), the wife of a prominent Greek banker, who donated it to the Ecumenical Patriarchate of Constantinople, which operated it as an orphanage. On April 21, 1964, during heightened tension of the Cyprus issue and persecution against the local Greek population by the state authorities, the orphanage was forcefully closed by the Directorate General of Foundations (Turkish: Vakiflar Genel Mudurlugu). In 1997, the property was seized by the Turkish state. Throughout its history, the orphanage has catered to the needs of 5,800 orphans.

== Building ==
The building is considered to be the largest wooden building in Europe and the second largest in the world (Tōdai-ji Buddhist Temple being the largest). The orphanage consists of 206 rooms, a kitchen, a library, a primary school and vocational workshops. It is situated on top of the Isa Tepesi, a mountain 206 meters high on the island of Büyükada.

== Deterioration and repair ==
Since its closure half a century ago, the neglected building has deteriorated into a state of heavy disrepair. The building was severely damaged by a fire in 1980. The site was included on the 2012 World Monuments Watch and is presently classified as "Rescue Needed" by Global Heritage Network.

In 2012, the Turkish authorities returned the orphanage to the Greek community, the community complained that: “The state did not return the building to us in the same shape it was in when they [seized] it. The most recent studies have revealed beyond any doubt that millions of euros will be required [to restore the orphanage]. It is not possible for the 2000-strong Greek population to meet this figure,”. According to reports 65 million euros would be necessary to put the orphanage back on its feet.

In 2018, Europa Nostra and the European Investment Bank included the Orphanage among 12 cultural heritages, which have been nominated for the Seven Most Endangered cultural heritages list. The same year, the Ecumenical Patriarch of Constantinople Bartholomew I asked, from the Turkish government, help to protect the building. But the plea came at a time of fresh tensions between Greece and Turkey over an array of issues, including the protection of Byzantine and Greek heritage in Istanbul.

A tender for the restoration of the school was planned for May 2023. In June 2026, an agreement was signed to undertake the restoration through a partnership between the Greek Orthodox Patriarchate, which owns the property, the Turkish conglomerate Bilgili Holding, and a Greece-based sustainable tourism and real estate company.

== Legal dispute ==
The Greek community of Turkey claimed that the Orphanage belonged to the Ecumenical Patriarchate on the basis of Ottoman edicts that granted title to the Patriarchate which was subsequently converted under the Turkish republic. On the other hand, the Turkish government believed that the property does not belong to the Ecumenical Patriarchate. In 2003, the Patriarchate had submitted all required documents to show evidence of its ownership to the Supreme Administrative Court in Turkey. The Supreme Administrative Court dismissed the claims and argued that the foundation had lost its function as an orphanage and has become a seized asset (Turkish: mazbut vakıf). This position adheres with Turkish law which ultimately claims that if a foundation hasn't been of use for more than 10 years, the Directorate of Foundations Council has the right to seize the property. In 2004, The European Union raised the issue in Turkey’s progress report towards accession.

In 2005, the Greek Patriarchate took its battle to recover the building to the European Court of Human Rights. In 2008, the court delivered a unanimous verdict condemning the seizure. Following the issuance of the judgment, no compensation was provided by the Turkish authorities and as a result the matter was brought before the Court once again in 2010. The 2010 judgment once again found in favor of the Patriarchate and ordered Turkey to return it to the Ecumenical Patriarchate within three months and to pay 26,000 euros in compensation(€6,000 in compensation for the harm suffered and €20,000 to cover legal costs and related expenses). In 2012, the Turkish authorities returned the building to the Greek community. The legal title is currently in the hands of the Ecumenical Patriarchate who plans to turn the building into a global environmental center, according to the current Greek Orthodox Patriarch, Bartholomew I.

== Gallery ==
Orphans at the dormitory of the Orphanage

Orphan students during class session

Orphan girls learning to knit at vocational school

Orphan students with their teacher

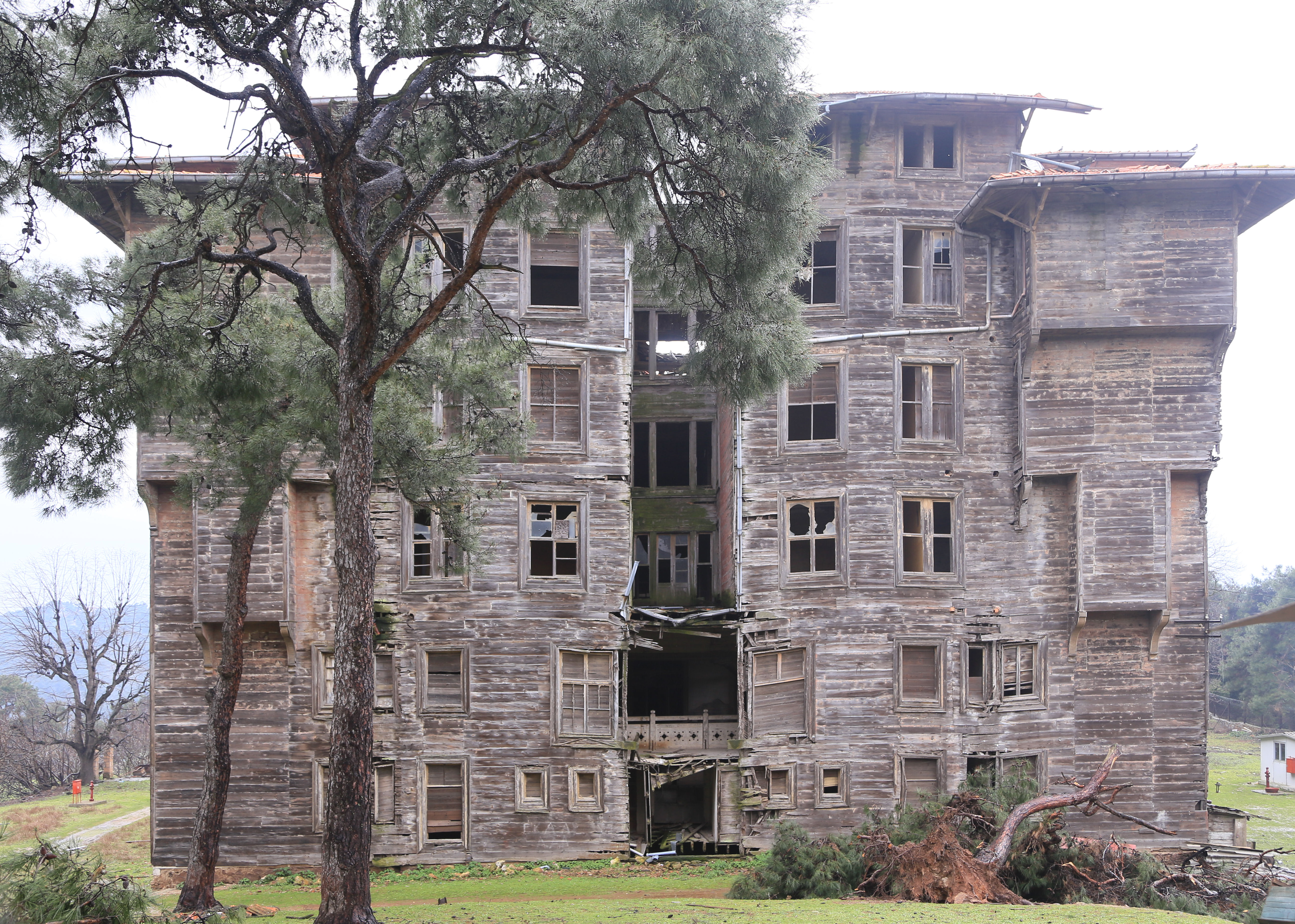
The Orphanage today
