= Stavros Zurukzoglu =

Swiss eugenicist (1896–1966)

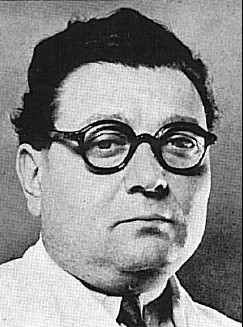
- Born: 5 April 1896; İzmir, modern-day Turkey
- Died: 26 November 1966 (aged 70); Bern, Switzerland
- Citizenship: Swiss citizen
- Known for: his writings on eugenics
- Scientific career
- Fields: Bacteriology; Social hygienics Eugenics
- Workplaces: University of Berne

Stavros Zurukzoglu (5 April 1896 – 26 November 1966) was an influential Swiss eugenicist.

In 1927 he got his Ph.D. in Medicine, he later became professor of bacteriology and hygiene at the University of Bern. In 1956 he was appointed honorary professor of social hygiene and eugenics.
