= Thomas Cosmades =

Thomas Cosmades (29 April 1924 in Istanbul – 20 September 2010) was a Turkish-born ethnic-Greek, later American national, Evangelical preacher and translator of New Testament in Turkish.

Cosmades was born of Greek parentage and served in the Turkish army during the Second World War. In 1949, he served as translator for American Aaron J. Smith during searches for Noah's Ark in Ararat. In 1950, he left Turkey for the US, followed by evangelical work in the Lebanon and then from 1968 was based in Germany as missionary at large for The Evangelical Alliance Mission.
