= The Twenty Classes =

Turkish labor battalions (1941–1942)

The incident of the Twenty Classes (Turkish: Yirmi Kur'a Nafıa Askerleri, literally: "Soldiers for Public works by drawing of twenty lots", or Yirmi Kur'a İhtiyatlar Olayı, literally: "Incident of the Reserve soldiers by drawing of twenty lots") was a conscription used by the Turkish government during World War II to conscript the male non-Muslim minority population mainly consisting of Christians (Armenians, Greeks, Assyrians) and Jews.

The conscription began in May 1941. All of the twenty classes were drawn from male minority populations and included the elderly and mentally ill. They were given no weapons but were gathered in Aşkale Labor Camp for manufacture of military equipment, building construction, construction and care of roads. They were forced to work under very poor conditions. The prevailing and widespread point of view on the matter was that, anticipating entry to World War II, Turkey gathered, in advance, all unreliable male citizens of non-Muslim ethnic groups regarded as a potential "fifth column" if Germany attacked Turkey, after it had also invaded its neighbors Greece and Bulgaria. In July 1942, the men were released from their duty.

One of the main intentions of the Turkish government was to seize the assets of the minority population. The conscripted minorities were bankrupted since they could not manage their businesses during the incident of the Twenty Classes and as a result they had to sell their companies and assets for nearly nothing. After this, there followed two major events with almost the same intentions: the 1942 fortune tax and the Istanbul Pogrom.

== See also ==
- Xenophobia and discrimination in Turkey
- Human rights in Turkey
- Cantonist, Russian policy of conscripting Jewish boys
- Devshirme, enslavement of minorities in the Ottoman Empire
