= Hristo Kostanda =

Turkish footballer (1918–1987)

Personal information
- Full name: Hristo Kostanda
- Date of birth: 1 January 1918
- Place of birth: Istanbul, Ottoman Empire
- Date of death: 27 November 1978 (aged 60)
- Place of death: Istanbul
- Height: 1.87 m (6 ft 2 in)
- Position: Full back

Senior career*
Years	Team	Apps	(Gls)
1935–1936	Güneş	4	(0)
1937–1939	Beşiktaş	5	(0)
1939–1942	Beyoğluspor	12	(2)
1942–1947	Beşiktaş	76	(4)
Total		97	(6)
- * Club domestic league appearances and goals

Hristo Kostanda (1 January 1918 – 27 November 1978), known by his given nickname Sütçü (lit. Milkman), was a Turkish footballer.

He is best known for his spell at Beşiktaş J.K, alongside players such as Hakkı Yeten, Şeref Görkey and Şükrü Gülesin.

== Style of play and reception ==
Kostanda is regarded as one of "club legends" by Beşiktaş J.K. During his professional career, Kostanda possessed renown attributes of strength, ball control and long-range shots. He had ability of enhanced long-range-passing supported by his ambidexterity.

== Personal life ==
Kostanda was descendant of a Christian-Macedonian family from Macedonia administrative region of Greece. Along with football career, he ran a family business involved in dairy products.

Kostanda was married with two daughters, both played volleyball. Lidya, her elder daughter (born 1951) died in May 1972. Violet Duca, his younger daughter born 1958, played volleyball at Eczacıbaşı S.K. between 1972 and 1986 and, represented Turkey 120 times.

In February 1977, Kostanda had a heart attack. Later suffered from a stroke, Kostanda died on 27 November 1977. He was buried in Feriköy Bulgarian Cemetery.

== Achievements ==
- Turkish National Division (2): 1944, 1947
- Istanbul Football Cup (2): 1944, 1946
- Prime Minister's Cup (1): 1944

=== Individual ===
- Beşiktaş J.K. Squads of Century (Bronze Team)
