= Varlık Vergisi =

1942 tax levied on Turkey's non-Muslim citizens

The Varlık Vergisi (Turkish: [vaɾˈɫɯk ˈvɛɾɟisi], "wealth tax" or "capital tax") was a tax mostly levied on non-Muslim citizens under the Republican People's Party (CHP) government in Turkey in 1942, with the stated aim of raising funds for the country's defense in case of an eventual entry into World War II. The underlying reason for the tax was to inflict financial ruin on the minority non-Muslim citizens of the country, end their prominence in the country's economy and transfer the assets of non-Muslims to the Muslim bourgeoisie. It was a discriminatory measure which taxed non-Muslims up to ten times more heavily and resulted in a significant amount of wealth and property being transferred to Muslims.

The tax was also meant to target nationals of other countries, including the United Kingdom, the United States, the USSR, Germany, France, Italy and Switzerland, among others, but after complaints from multiple embassies, Turkey was forced to back off.

Some historians consider the tax to have been a form of economic and cultural genocide.

== Background ==
The Şükrü Saracoğlu government introduced a bill for a one-off tax, which was approved by the Turkish parliament on November 11, 1942. This tax targeted fixed assets, including landed estates, buildings, businesses, and industrial enterprises owned by all citizens but disproportionately affected minorities. Non-Muslim communities, such as Jews, Greeks, Armenians, Assyrians, and "Levantines" (Western European Catholics), who played a significant role in the economy, were particularly hard-hit, with Armenians bearing the heaviest tax burden.

While the tax was supposedly meant for all Turkish citizens, it disproportionately burdened non-Muslims with exorbitant and arbitrary rates. The consequences were severe—the remaining non-Muslim merchant class was decimated, and many non-Muslim families faced financial ruin. The taxes reached staggering levels, at times surpassing an individual's entire wealth. The law applied even to impoverished non-Muslims like drivers, workers, and beggars, while their Muslim counterparts enjoyed exemption. The Varlık Vergisi led to a number of suicides among ethnic minority citizens in Istanbul.

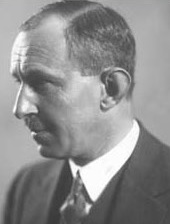
Fazıl Ahmet Aykaç, one of the proponents of the Varlık Vergisi

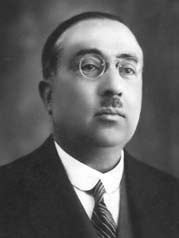
Neşet Özercan, one of the opponents of the tax

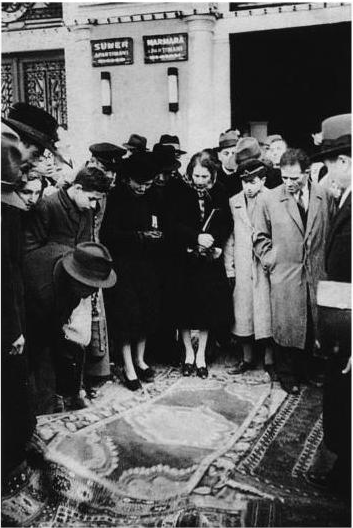
Non-Muslims auctioning off their furniture to pay for the tax

Population group	Amount of taxes to be paid
Christian Armenians	232%
Jews	179%
Christian Greeks	156%
Muslims	4.94%

During World War II, Turkey maintained a neutral stance until February 1945. The official rationale for the tax was to bolster the state treasury in preparation for a potential invasion by Nazi Germany or the Soviet Union. However, the primary motive behind the tax was to assert national control over the Turkish economy. By diminishing the influence and control of minority populations in trade, finance, and industries, the government aimed to create a new Turkish Muslim bourgeoisie.

The tax could not be challenged neither by legal nor administrative means, except if there was a duplication. Non-Muslims were given a 15-day window to pay their dues in cash. Those unable to meet the obligation resorted to borrowing from friends or family, selling properties at public auctions, or offloading businesses to gather funds.

For those incapable of payment, they were sent to labor camps in eastern Anatolia. This, however, was only applied to non-Muslims. Though workers received wages, half was deducted to offset their debts. Elderly individuals, unable to endure the rigorous labor, collaborated with younger villagers from Aşkale, paying them daily wages to work in their stead. All five thousand sent to the labor camps were non-Muslims, as Muslim taxpayers faced milder consequences. Despite the law exempting those over fifty-five from labor service, even elderly and sick individuals found themselves dispatched.

Twenty-one people died in these camps, at least, and their wealth was confiscated by the Turkish government and sold at significantly reduced prices to Turkish Muslims, laying the groundwork for some contemporary Turkish conglomerates. The state also seized property from close relatives – parents, parents-in-law, children, and siblings – selling it to settle tax amounts, even if the individual had been consigned to forced labor. In addition, it is estimated that related deaths were many more, since most victims came back from these camps in a much worse physical and mental state than before.

Taxpayers were classified into four separate lists, the "M" list, for Muslims, the "G", for non-Muslims (Gayrimuslim), the "E", for Foreigners (Ecnebi) and the "D" for converts (Dönme). Foreign-passport residents in Turkey who gave in a tax return or owned a business were forced to pay a huge capital levy on supposed wealth too, although none of them were ruined or committed suicide, largely due to the efforts of their respective embassies. Devoid of any factual basis, the tax seemed to arise solely from the authorities' whims, prompting foreign embassies and consulates to intervene on behalf of their nationals. During the period, the Turkish press allegedly published "anti-minority" articles and reports.

Official figures revealed that the Turkish government collected TL 324 million (when 1 US dollar equaled 1.20 Turkish lira) through the confiscation of non-Muslim assets – an amount surpassing $4 billion in 2022. According to Faik Ökte, the director of finance for the province of Istanbul at the time during the Varlık Vergisi, TL 289,256,246 was collected from non-Muslim minorities, TL 34,226,764 from converts, and TL 25,600,409 from Muslims. Despite the government's rigid enforcement of this discriminatory law, it failed to achieve the intended results. Companies, compelled to offset losses, sharply increased product prices, triggering an inflationary spiral that adversely impacted low-income consumers.

== Repeal and aftermath ==
International pressure led to the repeal of the controversial law on March 15, 1944, driven by strong criticism from the United Kingdom and the United States. Following its abolition, minority citizens detained in labor camps were released, and though the Turkish government pledged to refund paid taxes to non-Muslims, this promise went unfulfilled.

The opposition Democratic Party (DP) capitalized on its unpopularity in the general election of 1950, which was the first democratic general election in the Turkish Republic, thereby securing a landslide victory against the Republican People's Party (CHP).

The enduring impact of these taxes manifested in a lasting demographic shift within minority populations. Many, particularly the Greek minority, perceived an uncertain future in Turkey and sought refuge in Greece. Conversely, some from the Jewish community, having safeguarded assets abroad, managed to rebuild a more cautious life in Turkey. The tax precipitated the closure or sale of small businesses to larger entities, consolidating control in the hands of major business interests. It also facilitated state confiscation of significant minority property in Istanbul, not only reshaping the economy but altering the urban landscape as well. The 1935 Census recorded non-Muslims as 1.98% of the population; by 1945, this had fallen to 1.54%.

In addition, the Varlık Vergisi underscored that being Muslim held substantial implications for Turkish citizenship. Its treatment by the Turkish press highlighted the close ties between the Executive and the Press in the country.

In 1951, Faik Ökte, in his memoirs, admitted to the discriminatory application of the tax against non-Muslims. The Turkish press condemned him as a "traitor to the homeland" for publishing such revelations.

== The Varlık Vergisi as a form of genocide ==
In 1992, Turkish author Rıdvan Akar was the first to describe the Varlık Vergisi as a form of genocide. In 2009, Turkish historian and genocide scholar Sait Çetinoğlu wrote a book named "Ekonomik ve kültürel jenosit: Varlık Vergisi 1942–1944", writing that the tax was a form of economic and cultural genocide, comparing it to the confiscation and theft of Armenian and Greek properties during the Armenian and Greek genocides ("national economy"). In a 2012 article, Çetinoğlu argued that:

Varlik Vergisi incorporates all the material and ethical elements of the United Nations definition of genocide as found in the Convention on the Prevention and Punishment of the Crime of Genocide of 1948. This is so because Turkish official action against minorities was "committed with intent to destroy, in whole or in part, a national, ethnical, racial or religious group". The convention specifically mentions as genocidal commandeering the means of production of minorities and their livelihood as well as exiling some of them to forced labor camps, crimes related to “deliberately inflicting on the group conditions of life calculated to bring about its physical destruction in whole or in part".

In 2013, Turkish historian Bülent Bilmez wrote that some publications by "courageous authors" have labeled the Varlık Vergisi as a form of genocide. According to him, this classification is becoming more widespread, evidenced by an increase in MA and PhD studies on these issues.

== In popular culture ==
The historical novel Salkım Hanım'ın Taneleri (variously translated as Mrs. Salkım's Diamonds/Pearls/Beads/Necklace), written by Turkish author Yilmaz Karakoyunlu, recounts stories and witnesses of the non-Muslims during the Varlık Vergisi. The same novel was turned into a film of the same name, Mrs. Salkım's Diamonds. Members of parliament, such as Ahmet Çakar (MHP), were outraged at the screening.

The Netflix series The Club revolves around a Jewish woman who was victimized by the tax and its aftermath.

== See also ==
- Economic history of Turkey
- Taxation of the Jews in Europe for other types of taxes imposed on the Jews
- Judenvermögensabgabe, a similar tax targeting wealthy Jews in Nazi Germany
- Confiscated Armenian properties in Turkey
- Jizya
- Dhimmi
- The Twenty Classes
- Human rights in Turkey
- Freedom of religion in Turkey
- Xenophobia and discrimination in Turkey
