= Violet Duca =

Turkish volleyball player and manager

Personal information
- Full name: Violet Kostanda Duca
- Nickname: Vio
- Born: 26 January 1958 (age 68) Istanbul, Turkey
- Home town: Istanbul, Turkey

Coaching information
- Current team: Fenerbahçe Acıbadem
- Previous teams coached
- Years: Teams
- 1972–1986: Eczacıbaşı S.K.
Honours
Women's volleyball
Representing Eczacıbaşı S.K.
The Champion Clubs
Silver medal – second place	1980	Team
Representing Fenerbahçe
Women's CEV Champions League
Gold medal – first place	Baku 2012	Team
Bronze medal – third place	Istanbul 2011	Team
Silver medal – second place	Cannes 2010	Team
Women's CEV Top Teams Cup
Bronze medal – third place	Novara 2009	Team
Gold medal – first place	Best Spiker	Personal
FIVB Volleyball Women's Club World Championship
Gold medal – first place	Doha 2010	Team

Violet Kostanda Duca (born 26 January 1958 in Istanbul) is a Turkish former volleyball player and current Fenerbahçe Acıbadem manager. She is of Greek descent. Her father Hristo Kostanda is a former footballer who played for Beşiktaş JK. She played 120 times for national team.

She played for Eczacıbaşı S.K. and also managed Beşiktaş JK between 2005 and 2008.

== Honours ==
=== As player ===
  - 14 times (1972–73, 1973–74, 1974–75, 1975–76, 1976–77, 1977–78, 1978–79, 1979–80, 1980–81, 1981–82, 1982–83, 1983–84, 1984–85, 1985–86) Turkish Women's Volleyball League Champion with Eczacıbaşı S.K.
  - 1980 The Champion Clubs Runner-Up with Eczacıbaşı S.K.

=== As manager ===
  - 2010 FIVB World Club Championship Champion with Fenerbahçe Acıbadem
  - 2011–12 CEV Champions League Champion with Fenerbahçe Universal
  - 2009–10 CEV Champions League Runner-Up with Fenerbahçe Acıbadem
  - 2010–11 CEV Champions League Bronze Medalist with Fenerbahçe Acıbadem
  - 2008–09 Women's CEV Top Teams Cup 3rd place with Fenerbahçe Acıbadem
  - 2 times (2008–09, 2009–10) Aroma Women's Volleyball League Champion with Fenerbahçe Acıbadem
  - 1 time (2009–11) Aroma Women's Volleyball League Champion with Fenerbahçe Universal
  - 1 time (2009) Turkish Cup Champion with Fenerbahçe Acıbadem
  - 2 times (2009, 2010) Turkish Super Cup Champion with Fenerbahçe Acıbadem

== See also ==
- Turkish women in sports
