= İzbırak, Midyat =

Village in Mardin Province, Turkey

İzbırak
- Neighbourhood
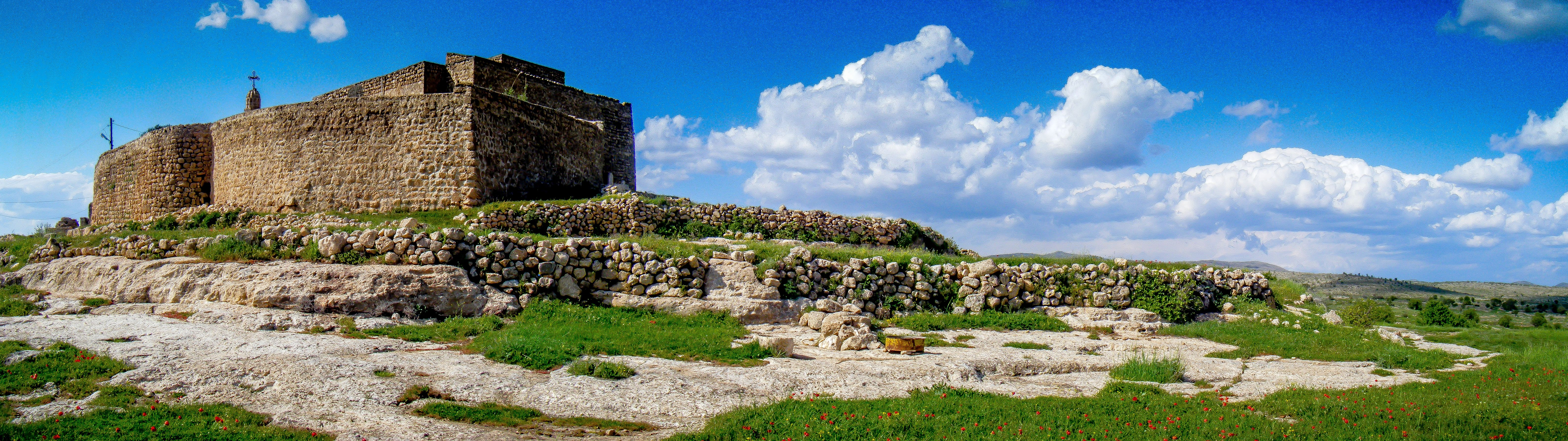
- Church of Mor Dinot

- Location within Turkey
- Coordinates: 37.513°N 41.536°E
- Country: Turkey
- Province: Mardin
- District: Midyat
- Population (2021): 32
- Time zone: UTC+3 (TRT)

İzbırak (Arabic: زاز, romanized: Zaz; Kurdish: Zazê; Syriac: ܙܰܐܙ, romanized: Zāz) (Note: Nisba: Zāzōyo.) is a neighbourhood of the municipality and district of Midyat, Mardin Province in southeastern Turkey. The village is populated by Syriacs and by Kurds of the Elîkan tribe had a population of 32 in 2021. (Note: For the use of the term "Syriac" to refer to the population of Zaz. For use of the term "Assyrian". The terms "Syriac" and "Assyrian" are used to refer to the same group of people.) It is located in the historic region of Tur Abdin.

In the village, there is the Mor Dimet Church and Church of Mort Shmuni.

== History ==
Zāz (today called İzbırak) is identified as the settlement of Zazabukha, where the Assyrian king Ashurnasirpal II made camp whilst on campaign against Nairi and received tribute from Khabkhi in 879 BC. Arches on the north side of the Church of Mor Dimet suggest pre-Christian buildings originally stood on the site. Mor Gabriel of Beth Qustan (d. 648) is said to have resurrected a man from Zāz. The Church of Mor Dimet was constructed by 932, from which year a funerary inscription survives. Mar Yab, the priest of Zāz, is named amongst those who were killed in the Cave of Ibn Siqi by the soldiers of Timur in 1394 (AG 1605). In 1454 (AG 1765), many men from the village were suffocated to death by smoke by Turks of the clan of Hasan Beg, as per the account of the priest Addai of Basibrina in c. 1500 appended to the Chronography of Bar Hebraeus.

Rabban Aziz of Zāz is attested at the Monastery of Mar Malke in 1476. Basilius Mas’ud of Zāz, metropolitan of Zarjal, Arzen, Se’ert, and Hisn Kifa in 1481–1491/1492, was ordained by Patriarch Ignatius Sobo of Arbo. Masʿūd II of Ṭur ʿAbdin, patriarch of Tur Abdin (r. 1491–1512), was from the village. Basilus Yeshu’ II of Zāz, metropolitan of Zarjal in 1492/1493–1515/1516, was ordained by Patriarch Masʿūd II and became patriarch of Tur Abdin as Ignatius Yeshu’ III (r. 1515/1516–1524). Philoxenus Aziz of Zāz, of the Monastery of Mar Malke, was bishop of the Monastery of the Cross. The deacon-monk Rabban Serjis of Zāz is attested at the Monastery of Mar Malke in 1560. The Church of Mor Dimet at Zāz was struck by lightning in 1571 (AG 1882). Dionysius Iliyya, son of priest Mansur of Zāz, was bishop of the Monastery of the Cross and Hah in 1583–1608. Basilius Yeshu’ III of Zāz, metropolitan of Zarjal in 1590–1602, was ordained by Patriarch Ignatius David II Shah.

Bishop Jirjis of Zāz was ordained by Patriarch Habib before 1706. In 1714, five men were killed at Zāz by an amir called Bidayn and his men, who also destroyed the Church of Mor Dimet, according to a Syriac memro (metrical ode) written by the priest Yuhanna of Basibrina from the Qardash family. Dionysius Saliba of Zaz, metropolitan of Hah and the Monastery of the Cross in 1725/1726–1756, was ordained by Patriarch Denha. Dionysius Saliba of Zaz was bishop of Hah in 1797–c. 1800. Dionysius Barsoum of Zāz was metropolitan of Zāz in 1813–1828 and Dionyius Saliba of Zāz was metropolitan of Zāz in 1817–1828. (Note: Fiey suggests that Dionysius Barsoum of Zāz and Dionyius Saliba of Zāz can be linked to the diocese of Hah.) In the Syriac Orthodox patriarchal register of dues of 1870, it was recorded that the village had 64 households, who paid 140 dues, and was served by the Church of Morī Dīmiṭ and four priests.

In 1914, it was populated by 700 Syriacs, according to the list presented to the Paris Peace Conference by the Assyro-Chaldean delegation. They adhered to the Syriac Orthodox Church. (Note: The village was inhabited by about 2000 Syriacs in 1915, according to Günaysu.) Amidst the Sayfo, the village was attacked by Kurds in August 1915, and the villagers took refuge in the Church of Mor Dimet and two large houses. After receiving assurances the villagers wouldn't be harmed, 365/366 Syriacs left the buildings, but were taken by the Kurds to a hill named Perbume between Zāz and Heştrek where they were slaughtered and shot and their bodies were later burned. A survivor of the massacre at Perbume returned to Zāz and warned the villagers, who subsequently held out for a month. Some survivors fled to Ayn Wardo. An Ottoman official arrived at the village and assured the villagers of their safety, only to separate the young, who were given to Kurds from neighbouring villages, and split the remaining Syriacs in two groups. One group was sent to Kerboran, and the other was sent to Midyat, where they were forced to collect and bury the corpses of Syriacs who had been killed in the streets of those places, as well as pick up animal faeces. Those who did not die of hunger or thirst were killed once the corpses were buried.

Some villagers who had survived the genocide were helped to return to Zāz in 1920 by Çelebi, agha (chief) of the Heverkan clan. A portico was added to the Church of Mor Dimet in 1924. The Church of the Mother of God at Zāz was built about 1960. The population was 416 in 1960. In 1966, there were 515 Turoyo-speaking Christians in 73 families at Zāz who were served by one priest. The villagers began to emigrate in 1975. By 1978, the Church of Mor Gabriel at Zāz was in ruins. The village had a priest in 1979. In 1981, there was a school in the village.

In the early 1990s, there were skirmishes between village guards, the Turkish military, and Kurdistan Workers' Party (PKK) militants near the village as part of the Kurdish–Turkish conflict. Village guards and their relatives extorted 20 million Turkish lira from the villagers on 18 February 1992 on threat of killing the mukhtar Gevriye Akyol. The Syriac villagers were forced to flee to Midyat in April 1993 upon receiving death threats from village guards, and they remained there in the hope the situation would improve, but again received death threats on returning to Zāz in the summer. The four Kurdish families were allowed to remain, whereas the Syriacs emigrated to Germany, Sweden, Belgium, Austria, and France. The majority of Syriacs from Zāz eventually settled at Hamburg in Germany.

The Church of Mor Dimet was restored in the late 1990s by Syriacs in the diaspora and a monk and nun took up residence in the church in 2001. It was reported that Kurds from neighbouring villages had seized the Syriac houses and land, damaged the church by pouring sewage into it, and verbally and physically abused the monk and nun. The village was occupied by the village guards until 2005. An olive grove belonging to a Syriac villager was destroyed in suspicious circumstances in December 2022. The Church of the Virgin Mary at Zāz was restored and reopened in September 2024, by which time 25 houses had been constructed in the village. The construction of a mosque in the village on land that had been illegally seized from a Syriac family was halted by the authorities in January 2025, at which time only one or two Muslim families inhabited the village.

== Demography ==
The following is a list of the number of Syriac families that have inhabited Zāz per year stated. Unless otherwise stated, all figures are from the list provided in The Syrian Orthodox Christians in the Late Ottoman Period and Beyond: Crisis then Revival, as noted in the bibliography below.

- 1915: 200
- 1966: 73/75 (Note: Ritter gives 73 families in 1966 whilst Dinno states there were 75.)
- 1978: 69
- 1979: 62
- 1981: 53
- 1987: 25

== Bibliography ==
- Barsoum, Aphrem (2003). The Scattered Pearls: A History of Syriac Literature and Sciences. Translated by Matti Moosa (2nd ed.). Gorgias Press.
- Barsoum, Aphrem (2008). The History of Tur Abdin. Translated by Matti Moosa. Gorgias Press.
- Bcheiry, Iskandar (2009). The Syriac Orthodox Patriarchal Register of Dues of 1870: An Unpublished Historical Document from the Late Ottoman Period. Gorgias Press.
- Biner, Zerrin Özlem (2020). States of Dispossession: Violence and Precarious Coexistence in Southeast Turkey. University of Pennsylvania Press.
- Çetinoğlu, Sait (2018). "Genocide/ Seyfo – and how resistance became a way of life". In Hannibal Travis (ed.). The Assyrian Genocide: Cultural and Political Legacies (PDF). Translated by Abdulmesih BarAbraham. Routledge. pp. 178–191.
- Courtois, Sébastien de (2013). "Tur Abdin : Réflexions sur l'état présent descommunautés syriaques du Sud-Est de la Turquie,mémoire, exils, retours". Cahier du Gremmamo (in French). 21: 113–150.
- Dinno, Khalid S. (2017). The Syrian Orthodox Christians in the Late Ottoman Period and Beyond: Crisis then Revival. Gorgias Press.
- Fiey, Jean Maurice (1993). Pour un Oriens Christianus Novus: Répertoire des diocèses syriaques orientaux et occidentaux (in French).
- Gaunt, David (2006). Massacres, Resistance, Protectors: Muslim-Christian Relations in Eastern Anatolia during World War I. Gorgias Press.
- Gaunt, David (2017). "Sayfo Genocide: The Culmination of an Anatolian Culture of Violence". In David Gaunt; Naures Atto; Soner O. Barthoma (eds.). Let Them Not Return: Sayfo – The Genocide against the Assyrian, Syriac and Chaldean Christians in the Ottoman Empire (PDF). pp. 54–70.
- Güç-Işık, Ayşe (2014). "Süryani Cemaatinde Toplumsal Dönüşüm ve Siyasete Dâhil Olma". İnsan ve Toplum Bilimleri Araştırmaları Dergisi (in Turkish). pp. 739–760.
- Günaysu, Ayşe (2019). Safety Of The Life Of Nun Verde Gökmen In The Village Zaz (Izbirak) — Midyat, Tur Abdin – And The General Social Situation Of The Assyrian Villages In The Region (PDF). Translated by Abdulmesih BarAbraham. Human Rights Association Commission Against Racism and Discrimination.
- Güsten, Susanne (2016). A Farewell to Tur Abdin (PDF).
- Hollerweger, Hans; Palmer, Andrew (1999). Turabdin: Living Cultural Heritage (in English, German, and Turkish) (2nd ed.). Friends of Tur Abdin.
- Jongerden, Joost; Verheij, Jelle, eds. (2012). Social Relations in Ottoman Diyarbekir, 1870-1915. Brill.
- Omtzigt, Pieter; Tozman, Markus K.; Tyndall, Andrea, eds. (2012). The Slow Disappearance of the Syriacs from Turkey and of the Grounds of the Mor Gabriel Monastery (PDF). LIT Verlag Münster.
- Palmer, Andrew (1990). Monk and Mason on the Tigris Frontier: The Early History of Tur Abdin. Cambridge University Press.
- Ritter, Hellmut (1967). Turoyo: Die Volkssprache der Syrischen Christen des Tur 'Abdin (in German). Vol. 1. Franz Steiner Verlag.
- Sinclair, T.A. (1989). Eastern Turkey: An Architectural & Archaeological Survey. Vol. III. Pindar Press.
- Tan, Altan (2018). Turabidin'den Berriye'ye. Aşiretler - Dinler - Diller - Kültürler (in Turkish). ISBN 9789944360944.
- Wilmshurst, David (2019). "West Syrian patriarchs and maphrians". In Daniel King (ed.). The Syriac World. Routledge. pp. 806–813.
- Yuhanon, B. Beth (2018). "The Methods of Killing Used in the Assyrian Genocide". In Shabo Talay; Soner G. Barthoma (eds.). Sayfo 1915: An Anthology of Essays on the Genocide of Assyrians/Arameans during the First World War. Gorgias Press. pp. 177–214.
