= Assyrians in Austria =

Total population
- 2,500 - 5,000

Regions with significant populations
- Vienna

Languages
- Neo-Aramaic and Austrian German

Religion
- Syriac Christianity

Assyrians in Austria (German: Assyrer in Österreich) are Austrians of Assyrian descent or Assyrians who have Austrian citizenship.

== History ==
The Assyrian community in Austria began in 1974 when Assyrians from Diyarbakir, Midyat and Mardin in the Assyrian homeland immigrated to Vienna.

In 2009, an Assyrian clubhouse was opened in Vienna. The clubhouse organizes community events such as parties and conferences.

== Religion ==
Most Assyrians in Austria belong to the Syriac Orthodox Church, though a minority belong to the Assyrian Church of the East.

The Patriarchal Vicar responsible for the Syriac Orthodox community in Austria resides in the Swiss town of Arth. In 1987, the Syriac Orthodox church was recognized as a religious community by the government of Austria.

== Notable people ==
- Fadi Merza

== See also ==
- Assyrian diaspora
- Demographics of Austria
- Assyrians in France
- Assyrians in Germany
- Assyrians in the Netherlands
