= The Last Assyrians =

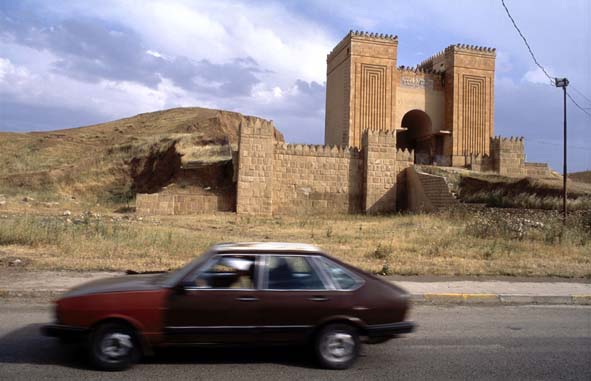
- Directed by: Robert Alaux
- Produced by: Francois Le Bayon; Robert Alaux
- Cinematography: Emile Loreaux; Robert Alaux
- Edited by: Agnes Mouchel
- Release date: 2004
- Running time: 53 minutes
- Country: France
- Languages: English, French, Syriac

The Last Assyrians (French: Les Derniers Assyriens) is a 2004 French documentary film by Robert Alaux.

== Synopsis ==
This film begins in the Chaldo-Assyrian community of Sarcelles, France (Paris metropolitan area) and tells of the rebuilding of the identity of the Eastern Aramaic-speaking Assyrians. They are one of the first people to convert to Christianity and they still speak and write Syriac, a northern Mesopotamian dialect of Aramaic which originated in Assyria during the 5th century BC. Originally all members of the Church of the East, they are today members of the Assyrian Church of the East, Chaldean Catholic Church Ancient Church of the East, Assyrian Pentecostal Church and Assyrian Evangelical Church. Central Aramaic speakers are members of the Syriac Orthodox Church and the Syriac Catholic Church. They originate from northern Iraq, south east Turkey, north east Syria and north west Iran (in essence the area that was known as Assyria from the 25th century BC to the 7th century AD) and are the descendants of the Semitic peoples of ancient Upper Mesopotamia.

Labelled by the European Catholic Church as heretics in the 5th century, they founded Church of the East and Syriac Church in the 1st century AD (erroneously renamed Nestorian and Jacobite by Western Christians). They have kept alive one of the oldest Christian liturgies; they translated ancient Greek texts first into Syriac and vice versa, and then into Arabic, and evangelised China, India and Mongolia during the Golden Age of the Arabic Empire.

In 1915, together with the Armenians and Greeks, they were the victims of ethnically and religiously motivated genocide perpetrated by the Turkish Ottoman Empire and many fled to Europe, the Russian Empire and the United States. Again, they were slaughtered in Iraq in 1933 in the Simele massacre. Even if various names are used to describe them - Assurayu, Assyrians, and later derivatives such as Chaldo-Assyrians, Syriacs, Atoraye, Assouri, Assuristani, Suraye, Suryoyo, East Syrians, - they share the same culture, religion and language, originate from the same region, have the same distinct genetic profile, and they belong to one people.

Very few Assyrians remain in Tur Abdin (Turkey), where monks protect some of the oldest monasteries of Christianity. There were around 1.5 million Assyrians in Iraq before 1990; now, many are fleeing their ancient homelands in the face of ethnic and religious persecution, and several political movements, like the Assyrian Democratic Movement and the Chaldean Syriac Assyrian Popular Council are working to help to maintain their culture. Now a big part of these communities lives in western countries where the memory of their genocide becomes a central point of their identity.

== Production and distribution ==
This film is the result of a seven years work in Turkey (Tur Abdin, Qotchanes, Hakkâri), Iraq (before and after the arrival of American troops), Syria, the United States, and Europe. It contains interviews of Pr. Sebastian Brock (Oxford, UK), and Pr. Joseph Yacoub (Lyon, France), and received support from the Aramaic speaking Churches. The documentary was made by Lieurac Productions(Paris, France) and financed by the Centre National de la Cinématographie.

It was broadcast on TV channels of European Union, North Africa and Middle East, and selected in several international festivals. Several screenings took place in France, Lebanon, United Kingdom, Spain, Italy, Germany, Netherland, Belgium, Sweden, Syria, Costa-Rica, Thailand and the United States.

This documentary film was one of the first to tell this history and to speak of the Assyrian genocide. The last Assyrians supports the fight for its recognition, and various institutions show the film in order to keep alive the culture of this indigenous people of Mesopotamia.

== See also ==
- Assyrian continuity
- Assyrian diaspora
- List of ethnic Assyrians
- Dawronoye
- Terms for Syriac Christians
- Assyrian independence movement
- Minorities in Iraq
- Christianity in Iraq
- Christianity in Turkey
- Christianity in Iran
- History of Eastern Christianity
- Chaldea
- Babylonia
- Adiabene
