= Religion in Istanbul =

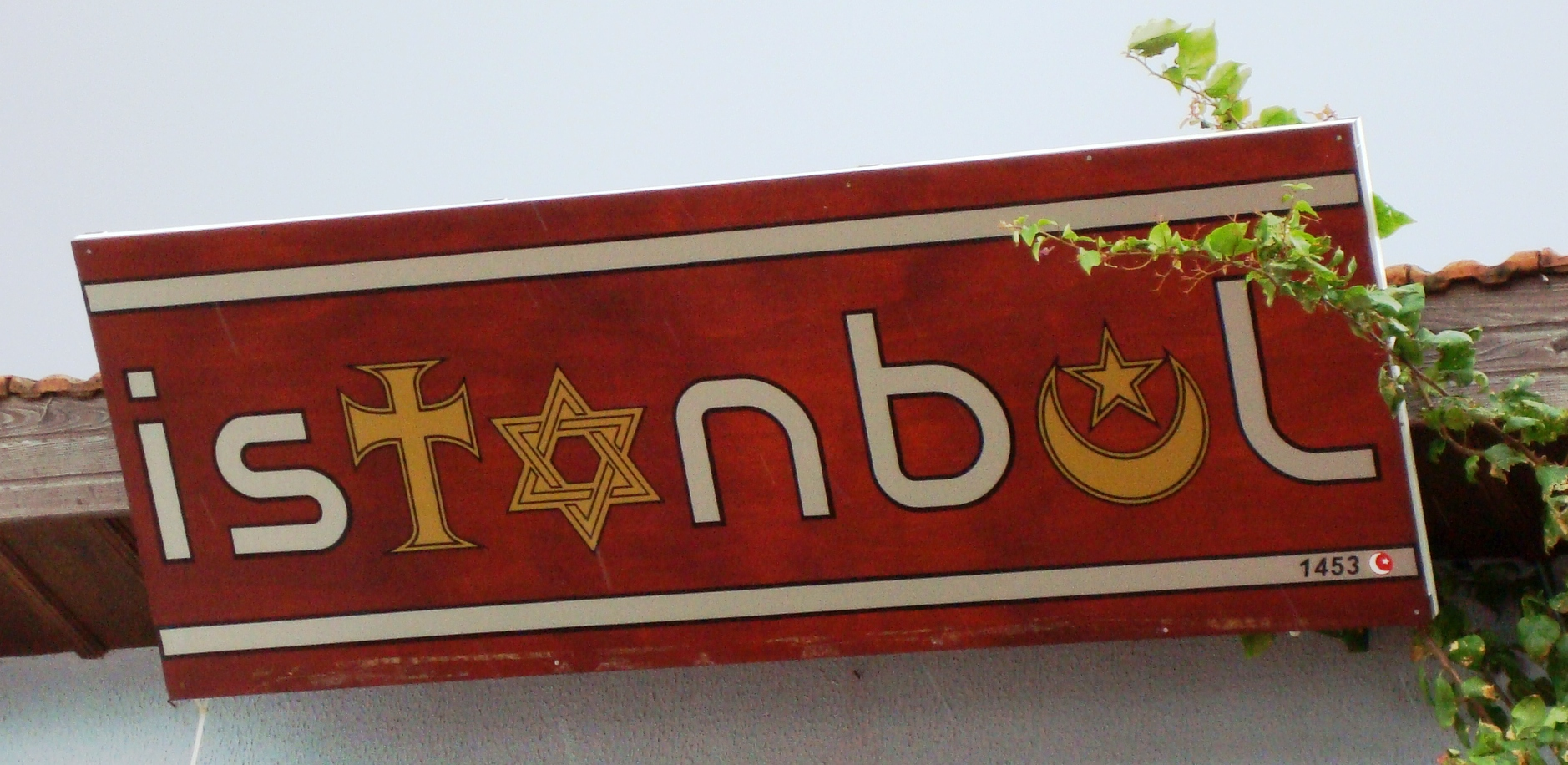
Istanbul text with Abrahamic religions' symbols.

Religion in Istanbul covers the issue of religion in the city of Istanbul, Turkey. More than 90% of Istanbul's population are Sunni Muslims and Alevism forms the second biggest religious group. A 2019 survey study by KONDA that examined the religiosity of the voting-age adults in Istanbul showed that 47% of the surveyed had a religion and were trying to practise its requirements. This was followed by nonobservant people with 34% who identified with a religion but generally did not practise its requirements. 11% stated they were fully devoted to their religion, meanwhile 4% were non-believers who did not believe the rules and requirements of a religion and 4% were atheists who did not believe in religion at all. 24% of the surveyed also identified themselves as "religious conservatives".

According to the 2000 census, there were 2691 active mosques, 123 active churches and 20 active synagogues in Istanbul; as well as 109 Muslim cemeteries and 57 non-Muslim cemeteries. Religious minorities include Greek Orthodox Christians, Armenian Christians, Catholic Levantines, Assyrian Christians, and Sephardic Jews. Some neighbourhoods have been known with their sizeable populations of these ethnic groups, such as the Kumkapı neighbourhood, which had a significant Armenian population, the Balat neighbourhood, which used to have a sizeable Jewish population, the Fener neighbourhood with a large Greek population, and some neighbourhoods in Nişantaşı and Pera, which had sizeable Levantine populations. In some quarters, such as Ortaköy or Kuzguncuk, an Armenian church sits next to a synagogue, and on the other side of the road a Greek Orthodox church is found beside a mosque.

Istanbul was the final seat of the Islamic Caliphate, from 1517 to 1924, when the Caliphate was dissolved and its powers were handed over to the Turkish Parliament. The seat of the Patriarch of Constantinople, spiritual leader of the Eastern Orthodox Church since the 4th century AD, is located in the Fener (Phanar) district. Also based in Istanbul are the archbishop of the Turkish Orthodox Church, the Armenian Patriarchate, and the Turkish Chief Rabbi (Hahambasi). Istanbul was formerly also the seat of the Bulgarian Exarchate, before its autocephaly was recognized by other Orthodox churches.

== Islam ==
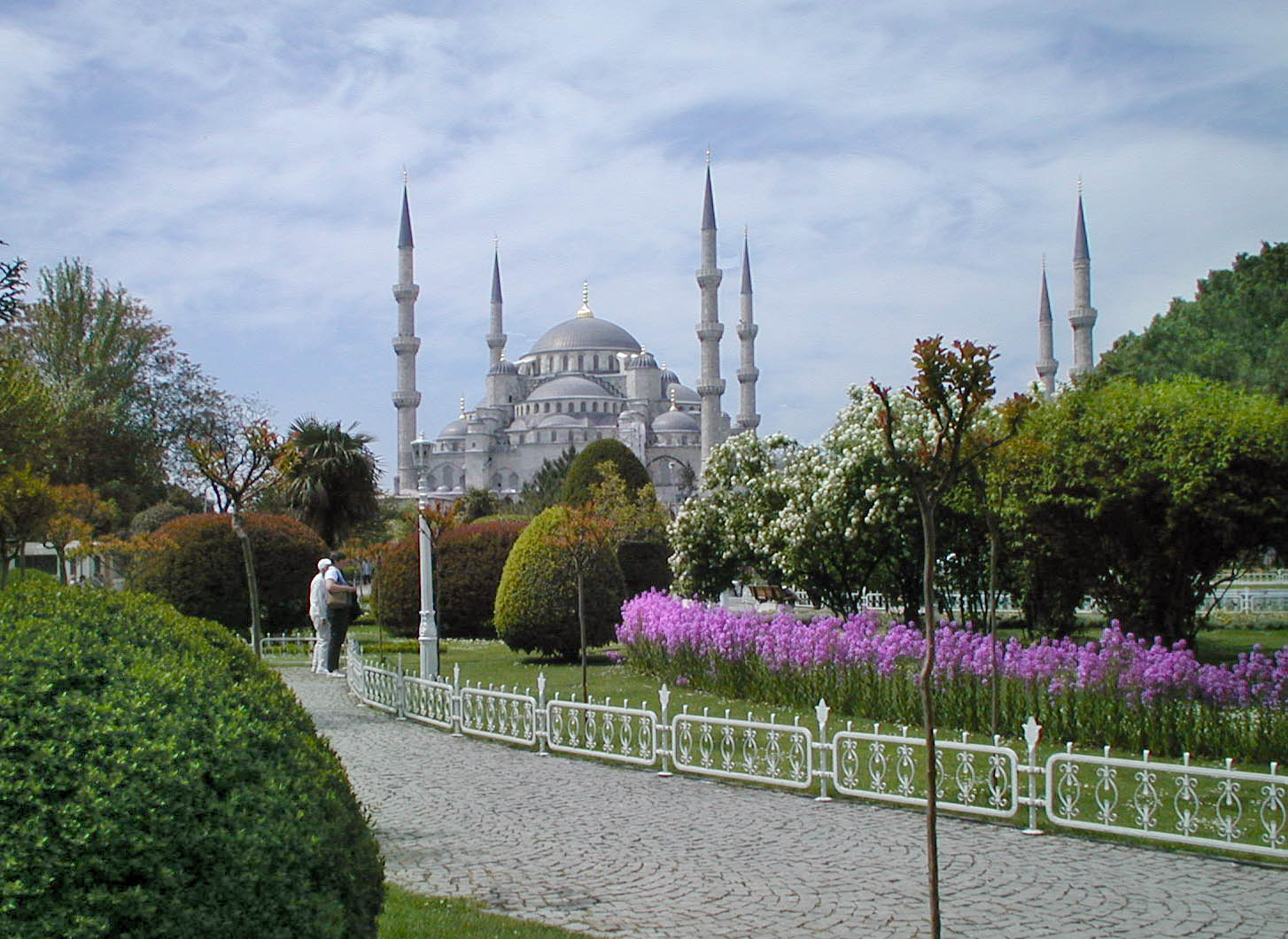
Sultan Ahmed Mosque in Istanbul.

The urban landscape of Istanbul is shaped by many communities. The most populous major religion is Islam. The first mosque in Istanbul was built in Kadıköy (ancient Chalcedon) on the Asian side of the city, which was conquered by the Ottoman Turks in 1353, a full century before the conquest of Constantinople across the Bosphorus, on the European side. The first mosque on the European side of Istanbul was built inside the Rumelian Castle in 1452. The first grand mosque which was built in the city proper is the Eyüp Sultan Mosque (1458), while the first imperial mosque inside the city walls was the Fatih Mosque (1470) which was built on the site of the Church of the Holy Apostles, an important Byzantine church which was originally edificed in the time of Constantine the Great. Many other imperial mosques were built in the following centuries, such as the famous Süleymaniye Mosque (1557) which was ordered by Suleiman the Magnificent and designed by the great Ottoman architect Mimar Sinan, and the famous Sultan Ahmed Mosque (1616) which is also known as the "Blue Mosque" for the blue tiles which adorn its interior.

Istanbul was the seat of the Islamic Caliphate, between 1517 and 1924. Some of the personal belongings of Muhammad and the earliest caliphs who followed him are today preserved in the Topkapı Palace, the Eyüp Sultan Mosque and in several other prominent mosques of Istanbul.

The conquest of the Byzantine capital of Constantinople in 1453 enabled the Ottomans to consolidate their empire in Anatolia and Thrace. The Ottomans later revived the title of caliph during the reign of Sultan Selim. Despite the absence of a formal institutional structure, Sunni religious functionaries played an important political role. Justice was dispensed by religious courts; in theory, the codified system of sharia regulated all aspects of life, at least for the Muslim subjects of the empire. The head of the judiciary ranked directly below the sultan and was second in power only to the grand vizier. Early in the Ottoman period, the office of grand mufti of Istanbul evolved into that of Sheikh ul-Islam (shaykh, or leader of Islam), which had ultimate jurisdiction over all the courts in the empire and consequently exercised authority over the interpretation and application of sharia. Legal opinions pronounced by the Sheikh were considered definitive interpretations.

== Christianity ==
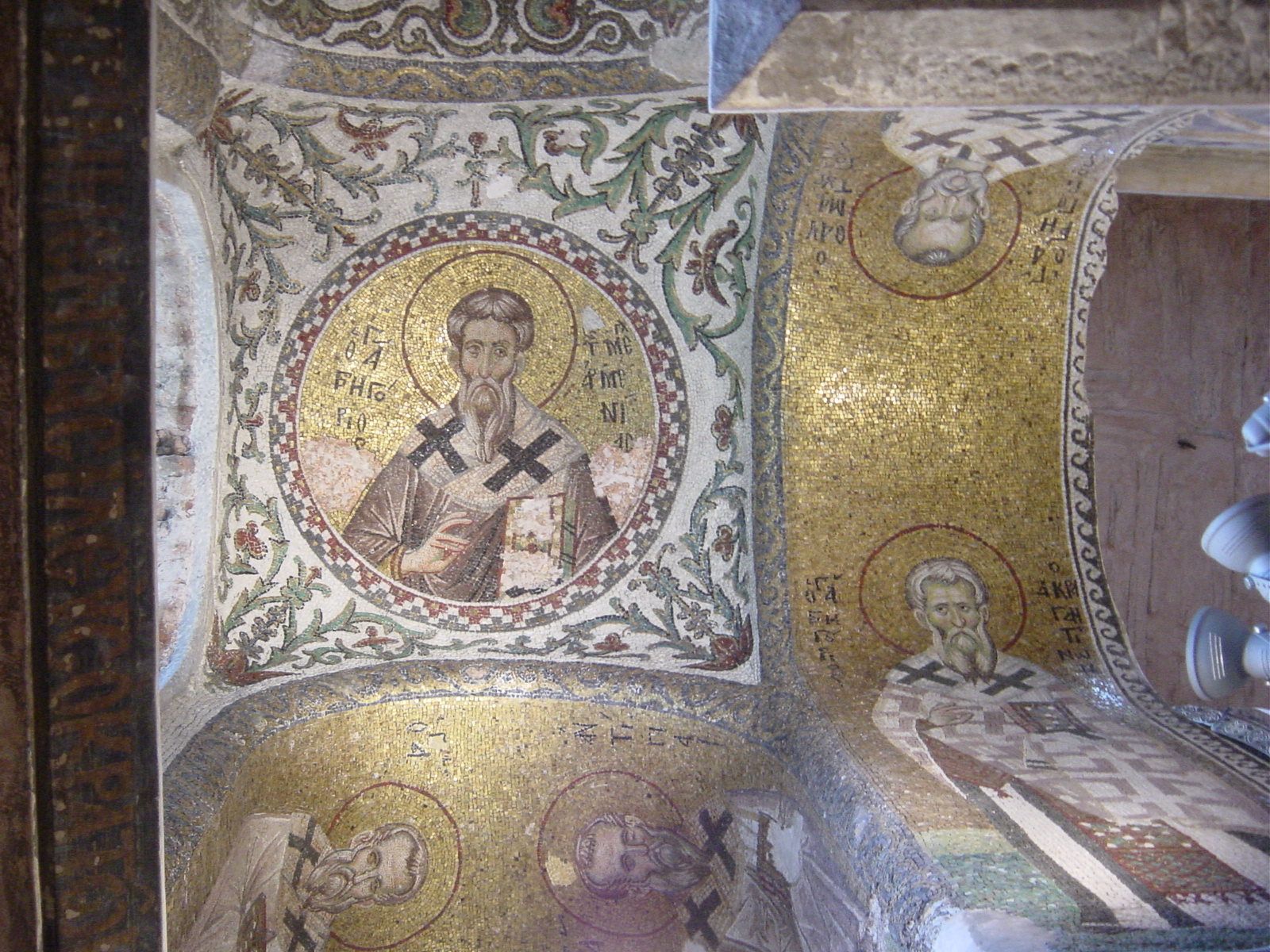
Pammakaristos Church has the largest amount of Byzantine mosaics in Istanbul after the Hagia Sophia and Chora Church

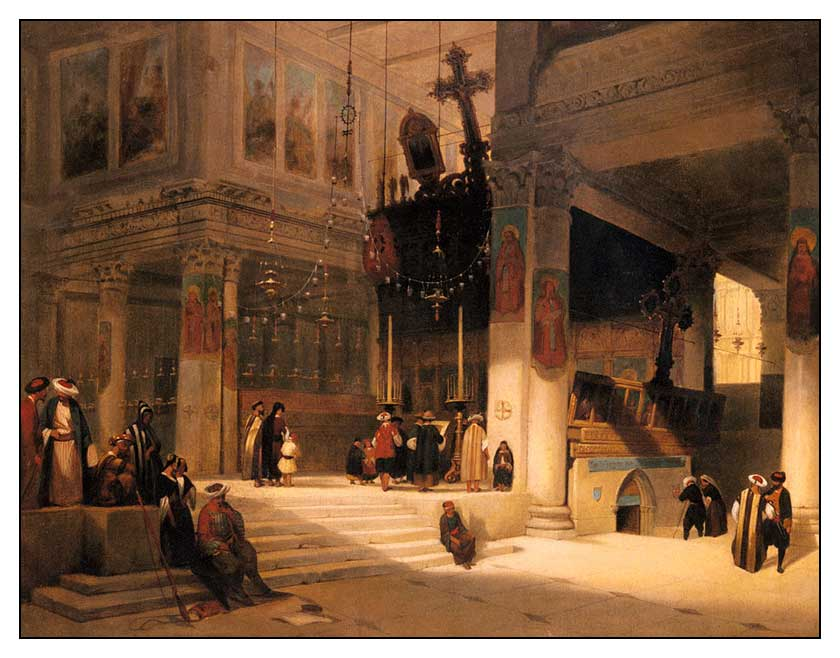
Orthodox Church in Constantinople around 1875, by Fabius Brest

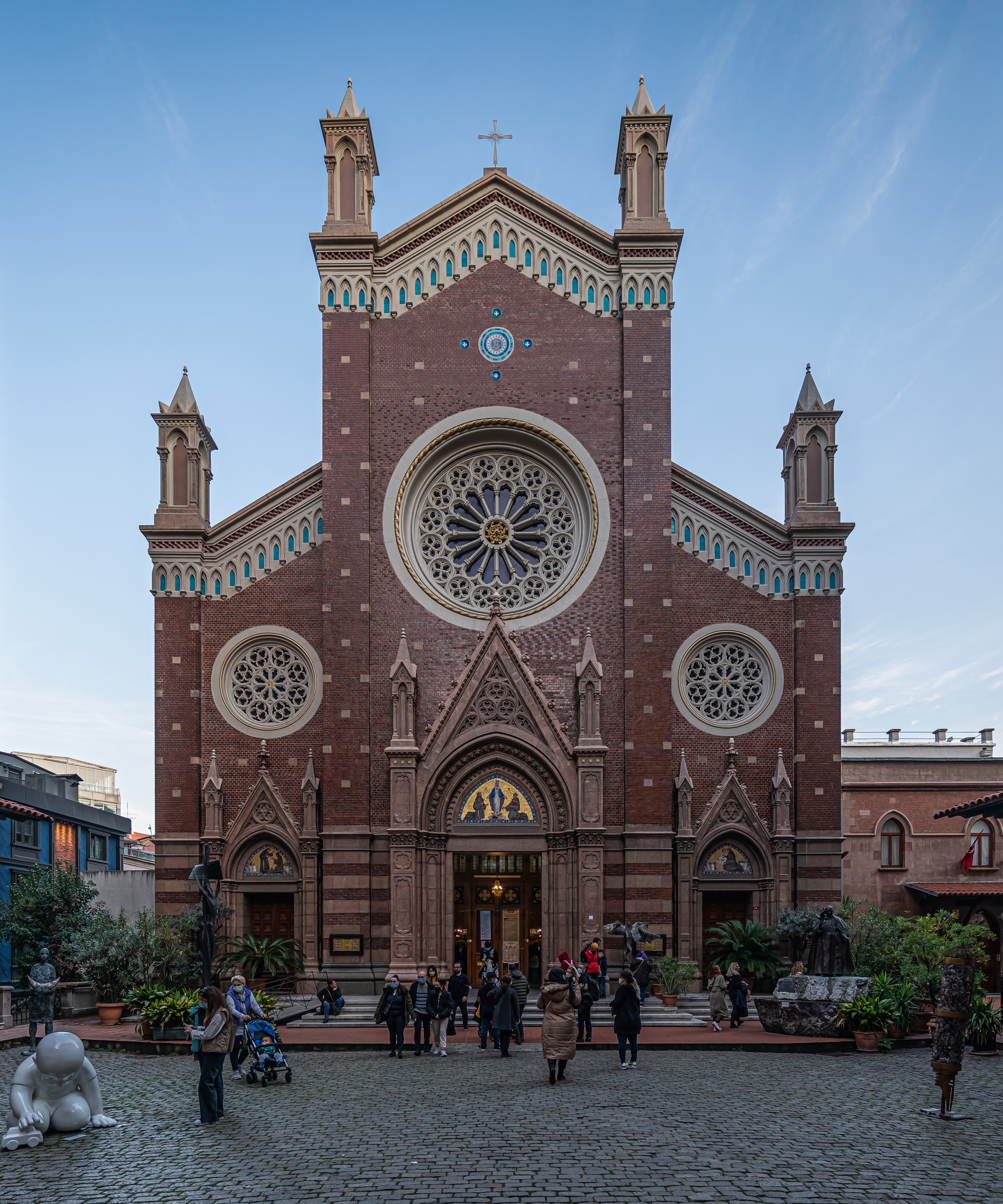
Church of St. Anthony of Padua, Istanbul built in Istanbul during Ottoman Empire.

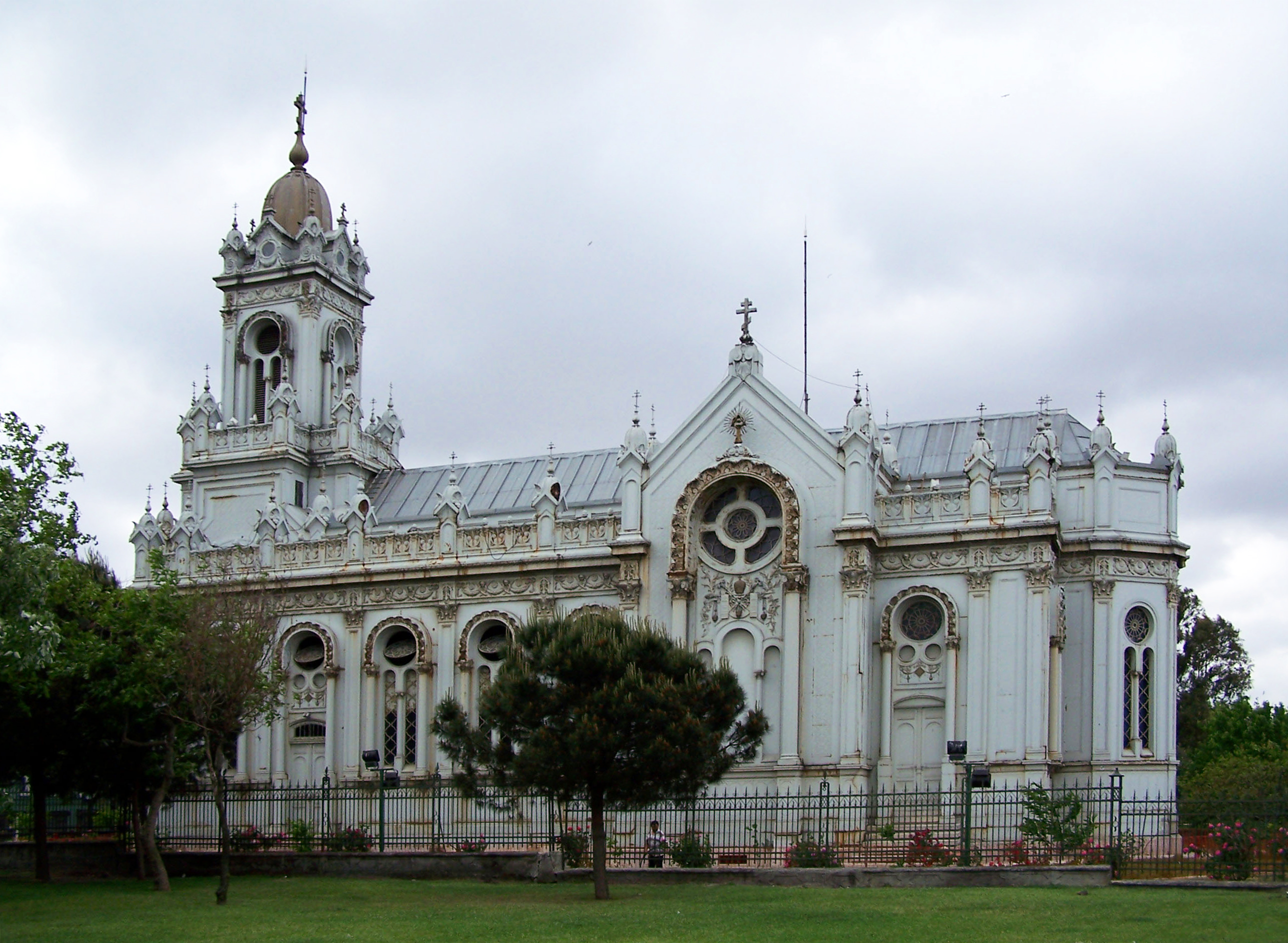
Bulgarian St. Stephen Church built in Istanbul during Ottoman Empire.

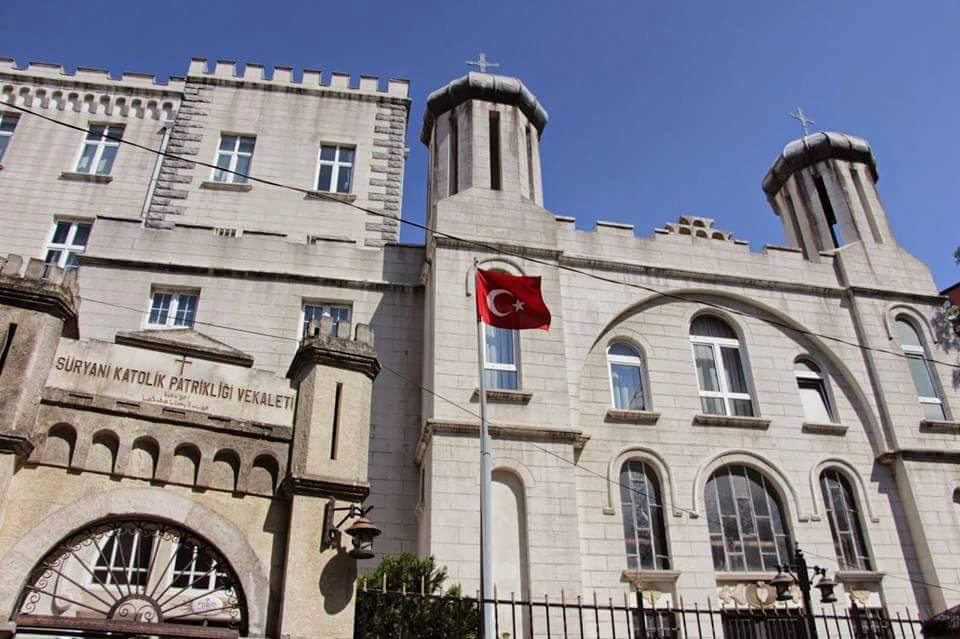
Syriac Catholic Church in Istanbul.

Constantinople is generally considered to be the center and the "cradle of Orthodox Christian civilization". The city has been the seat of the Ecumenical Patriarchate since the 4th century AD, and continues to serve as the seat of some other Orthodox churches, such as the Turkish Orthodox Church and the Armenian Patriarchate. The city was formerly also the seat of the Bulgarian Exarchate, before its autocephaly was recognized by other Orthodox churches.

Following the Turkish conquest of Constantinople in 1453, the Ottoman Sultan Mehmed II established the Millet System, according to which the different ethnic groups within Constantinople and the rest of the Ottoman Empire were to be governed by a group of institutions based on faith. For this purpose, Mehmed II also founded previously non-existent religious authorities such as the Armenian Patriarchate of Constantinople in 1461. Earlier, the Byzantines considered the Armenian Church as heretic and did not allow the Armenians to have churches inside the walls of Constantinople. Several Armenian saints, such as Saint Narses, were exiled and imprisoned in the Princes' Islands near Constantinople, in the Sea of Marmara. With the Millet System, a great deal of the internal affairs regarding these communities were assigned to the administration of these religious authorities; such as the Ecumenical Patriarchate for the affairs of all Orthodox Christians, the Armenian Patriarchate for the affairs of the Armenian (and for some time also the Syriac) Christians, and later the Chief Rabbi for the affairs of the Jews.

As middleman minorities, Greeks (Phanariots) and Armenians in Istanbul were overrepresented in commerce. The wealthy, Constantinople-based Amira class, a social elite whose members included the Duzians (Directors of the Imperial Mint), the Balyans (Chief Imperial Architects) and the Dadians (Superintendent of the Gunpowder Mills and manager of industrial factories). It was the wealth of the extensive Phanariots merchant class that provided the material basis for the intellectual revival that was the prominent feature of Greek life in the half century and more leading to the outbreak of the Greek War of Independence in 1821.

Into the 19th century, the Christians of Istanbul tended to be either Greek Orthodox, members of the Armenian Apostolic Church or Catholic Levantines. The everyday life of the Christians (50%), particularly the Greeks (260,000) and Armenians (160,000), living in Istanbul changed significantly following the bitter conflicts between these ethnic groups and the Turks during the Decline of the Ottoman Empire, which began in the 1820s and continued for a century. The conflicts reached their culmination in the decade between 1912 and 1922; during the Balkan Wars, the First World War and the Turkish War of Independence. The city's Greek Orthodox community was exempted from the population exchange between Greece and Turkey in 1923 following the establishment of the Turkish Republic. However, a series of special restrictions and taxes during the years of the Second World War (see, e.g., the wealth tax Varlık Vergisi), and the Istanbul Pogrom of 1955 which caused the deaths of 15 Greeks and the injury of 32 others, greatly increased emigration from Istanbul to Greece. In 1964, all Greeks without Turkish citizenship residing in Turkey (around 12,000) were deported. Today, most of Turkey's remaining Greek and Armenian minorities live in or near Istanbul. The number of the Armenians in Istanbul today amount to approximately 40,000 or 70,000, while the Greek community amounted to slightly more than 3,000 at the beginning of the 21st century. As of 2019, an estimated 18,000 of the country's 25,000 Assyrians live in Istanbul.

Beside the mostly Catholic Levantines, who are the descendants of European (Genoese, Venetian and French) traders who established trading outposts during the Byzantine and Ottoman periods, there is also a small, scattered number of Bosphorus Germans. A number of places reflect past movements of different communities into Istanbul, most notably Arnavutköy (Albanian village), Polonezköy (Polish village) and Yenibosna (New Bosnia).

There were more than 40,000 Catholic Italians in Istanbul at the turn of the 20th century, a figure which not only included the descendants of the local Genoese and Venetian merchants who lived there since the Byzantine and early Ottoman periods, but also the numerous Italian workers and artisans who came to the city from Italy during the 19th century. Giuseppe Garibaldi and Giuseppe Mazzini came to Constantinople in 1832, and again in 1833. Garibaldi lived in Beyoğlu and taught Italian, French and Mathematics in the foreign schools of this district. Garibaldi also established the Società Operaia Italiana di Mutuo Soccorso on May 17, 1863, in Beyoğlu, and became its first President (Mazzini was the second President). The Società Operaia Italiana di Mutuo Soccorso is still active and is located in its original site, on a side street of İstiklal Avenue. The number of Istanbul's Italians decreased after the end of the Ottoman Empire for several reasons. The Turkish Republic no longer recognized the trade privileges that were given to the descendants of the Genoese and Venetian merchants, and foreigners were no longer allowed to work in Turkey in a wide number of sectors, including many artisanships, in which numerous Istanbulite Italians used to work. The Varlık Vergisi (Wealth Tax) of the World War II years, which imposed higher tariffs on non-Muslims and foreigners in Turkey, also played an important role in the migration of Istanbul's Italians to Italy—who still live in the city, but in far fewer numbers when compared with the early 20th century. The influence of the Italian community of Istanbul, however, is still visible in the architecture of many quarters, particularly Galata, Beyoğlu and Nişantaşı.

The Mor Ephrem Syriac Orthodox church, opened on 8 October 2023, is the first church built since the foundation of the Republic of Turkey.

== Judaism ==
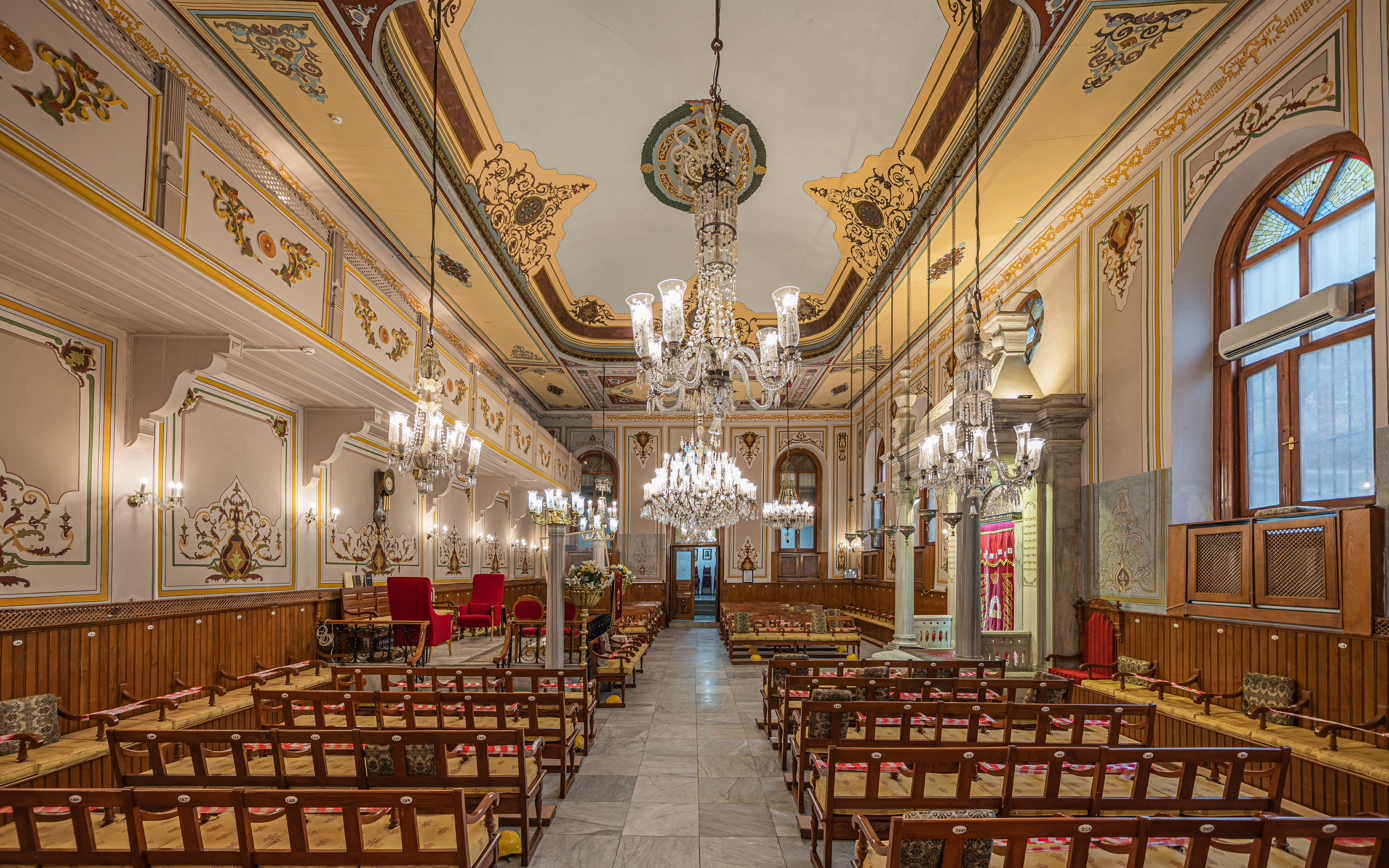
Hemdat Israel Synagogue in Istanbul.

The Sephardic Jews have lived in the city for over 500 years, see the history of the Jews in Turkey. The Sephardic Jews contributed much to the rising power of the Ottoman Empire by introducing new ideas, methods and craftsmanship. The first Gutenberg press in Istanbul was established by the Sephardic Jews in 1493, who excelled in many areas, particularly medicine, trade and banking. The Camondo family was highly influential in the Ottoman banking sector. The famous Camondo Stairs on the Bankalar Caddesi (Banks Street) in Karaköy (Galata) was built by them. More than 20,000 Sephardic Jews still remain in Istanbul today.

Romaniotes and Ashkenazi Jews resided in Istanbul even before the Sephardim, but their proportion has since dwindled; today, just 1 percent of Istanbul's Jews are Ashkenazi. The Avusturya Sinagogu (Austrian Synagogue), also known as the Aşkenaz Sinagogu (Ashkenazi Synagogue) is one of the most famous synagogues in Istanbul and stands out with its interesting architecture. A wave of Ashkenazi Jews came to Istanbul during the 1930s and 1940s following the rise of Nazism in Germany which persecuted the Ashkenazi Jews of central and eastern Europe.

Today, a total of 20 active synagogues are to be found in the city, the most important of them being the Neve Shalom Synagogue inaugurated in 1951, in the Beyoğlu quarter. The Turkish Grand Rabbi in Istanbul (currently Ishak Haleva) presides over community affairs.

A decrease in the population of the city's Jewish community occurred after the independence of the State of Israel in 1948, but the Turkish Jews who migrated to that country helped to establish strong relationships between Turkey and Israel. The founders of the State of Israel and prominent Israeli politicians such as David Ben-Gurion, Yitzhak Ben-Zvi and Moshe Shertok had all studied in the leading Turkish schools of Istanbul in their youth, namely Galatasaray High School and Istanbul University. As of 2022, the Jewish population in Turkey is around 14,500, with the majority of them living in either Istanbul or İzmir.
