= Mor Ephrem Syriac Orthodox Church =

Syriac Orthodox church in Istanbul, Turkey

- İstanbul Mor Efrem Süryani Kadim Ortodoks Kilisesi
- ܥܕܬܐ ܕܡܪܝ ܐܦܪܝܡ ܕܣܘܪ̈ܝܝܐ ܩܕ̈ܡܝܐ ܐܪ̈ܬܕܘܟܣܝܐ
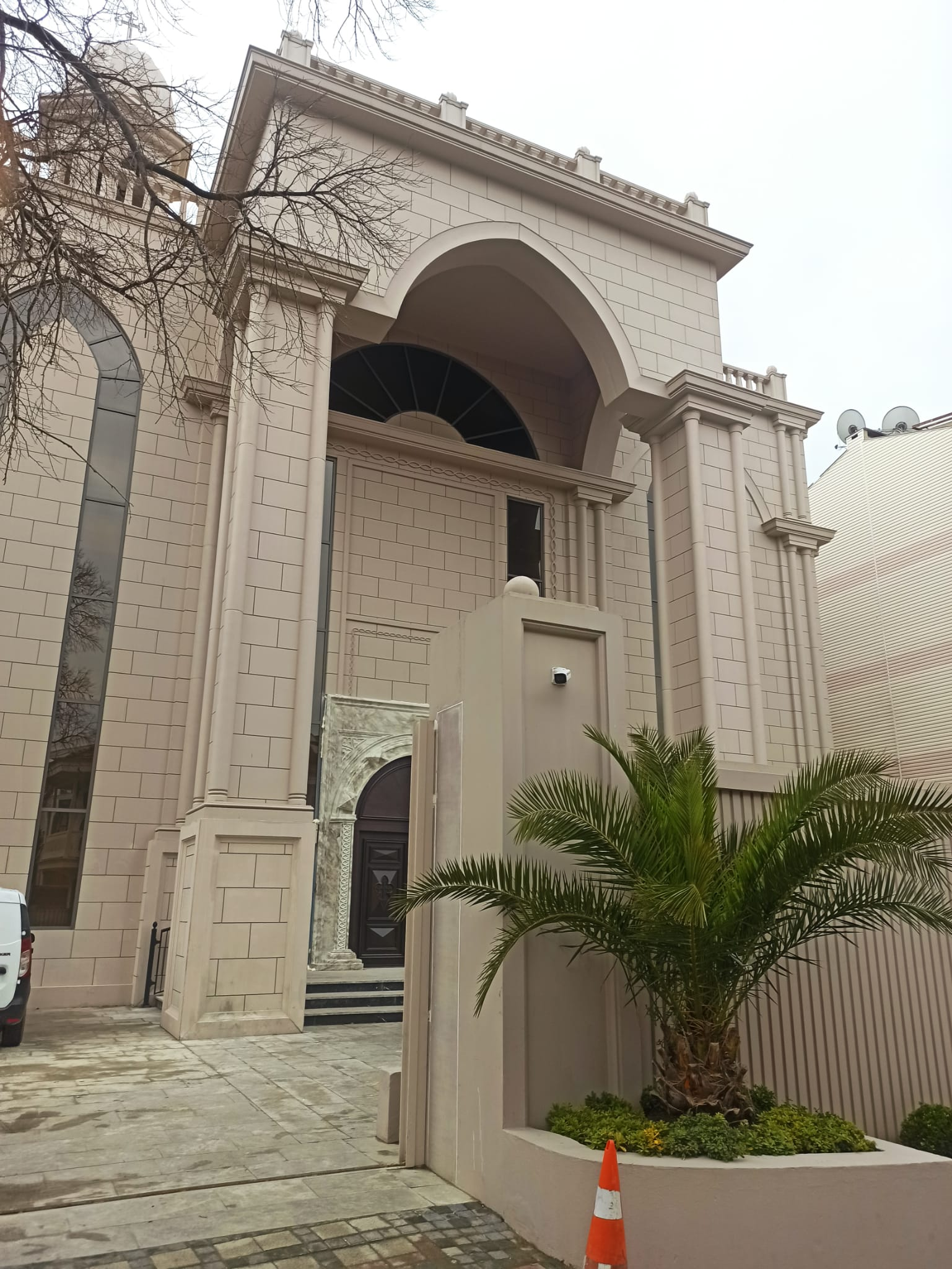
- Mor Ephrem Syriac Orthodox Church
- 40°57′36.65783″N 28°49′28.06349″E
- Location: Istanbul
- Country: Turkey
- Language: Syriac language
- Denomination: Syriac Orthodox

History
- Status: Church
- Dedication: Ephrem the Syrian
- Consecrated: 2023

Architecture
- Groundbreaking: 2019
- Completed: 2023; 3 years ago
- Construction cost: $4 million

Specifications
- Capacity: 750 people

Administration
- District: Bakırköy
- Province: Istanbul

The Mor Ephrem Syriac Orthodox Church (Turkish: İstanbul Mor Efrem Süryani Kadim Ortodoks Kilisesi, Syriac: ܥܕܬܐ ܕܡܪܝ ܐܦܪܝܡ ܕܣܘܪ̈ܝܝܐ ܩܕ̈ܡܝܐ ܐܪ̈ܬܕܘܟܣܝܐ, romanized: ʿIdto d-Mor ʾAp̄rem d-Suryoye Qamoye ʾOrṯodoksoye) is a Syriac Orthodox church in Yeşilköy on the European part of Istanbul. Opened in 2023, it is the first and only church built in Turkey since the foundation of the Republic. It is dedicated to Ephrem the Syrian.

== History ==
Its construction spanned a decade, including seven years for administrative formalities. In 2009, then Prime Minister Recep Tayyip Erdoğan ordered the Istanbul Metropolitan Municipality to find space for the building. The land was allocated by Istanbul Mayor Kadir Topbaş: It is an Italian Latin Catholic cemetery confiscated in 1950 by the Turkish state and unused since 1996. According to Erdoğan, the Holy See was consulted during the process. The church is not built on the graves but in the empty space in front of the cemetery.

In 2015, Prime Minister Ahmet Davutoglu announced its construction. On 3 August 2019, in the presence of metropolitan bishop of the Istanbul Syriac Church Filüksinos Yusuf Çetin, of Ecumenical Patriarch of Constantinople Bartholomew I, and of Istanbul Mayor Ekrem İmamoğlu, President Erdoğan laid in Yeşilköy the first stone of church.

It was inaugurated on 8 October 2023 by Erdoğan, in presence of Speaker of the Grand National Assembly Numan Kurtulmuş, Minister of Internal Affairs Ali Yerlikaya, Minister of Culture and Tourism Mehmet Nuri Ersoy, Presidential Communications Director Fahrettin Altun, AK Party Spokesperson Ömer Çelik and representatives of religious communities such as Yusuf Çetin, Deputy Patriarch of the Syriac Orthodox Church and Sait Susin, President of the Istanbul Syriac Kadim Foundation. The opening was delayed by the COVID-19 pandemic and the 2023 Turkey–Syria earthquakes.

The cost of construction is estimated at $4 million, funded with donations by the community. It benefited from the value-added tax exemption for places of worship.

On November 29, 2025, during his apostolic visit to Turkey, Pope Leo XIV met with the leaders of Turkey's Christian communities in Mor Ephrem.

== Building ==
The church has a capacity of 750 people. It is the second Syriac Orthodox church in Istanbul and it will serve the 17,000 Assyrians living in Istanbul, (Note: There is also a Syriac Catholic church in Istanbul.) most of them in Yeşilköy. It is a five-story building. Its architecture is inspired by Syriac churches and monasteries in Mardin Province.

== Community ==
A continuous internal migration of Syriac Orthodox Assyrians from Tur Abdin to Istanbul took place throughout the 20th century and intensified particularly from the 1960s onwards due to pressure from Kurdish tribes and in the 1980s and 1990s due to the conflict between the PKK and the Turkish army.

By far the largest group of Assyrians in Istanbul are those who belong to the Syriac Orthodox Church. There are also Assyrians belonging to the Chaldean Catholic and Syriac Catholic Churches in Istanbul. However, the Assyrian Church of the East is not present in Istanbul.

== See also ==
- Religion in Istanbul
- Assyrian people
- Tur Abdin
