= Assyrians in Belgium =

Assyrian people living in Belgium

Assyrians in Belgium are Belgian citizens of Assyrian descent. Belgium's Assyrian diaspora is concentrated in the Flemish cities of Mechelen and Antwerp, although there are also significant numbers living in Liège and Brussels. The majority of the Assyrian diaspora living in Belgium are originally from areas lying in southeastern Turkey such as Bohtan (Beth-Qardu), Tur-Abdin and Hakkâri.

== History ==
The first Assyrians came to Belgium around 1980; mostly from Tur Abdin in Turkey. They were political immigrants fleeing the Turkish-Kurdish conflicts in Southeast Turkey. They left their houses and moved to Europe for a brighter future. Following the First Gulf War, the majority of Assyrian immigrants have come to Belgium from Iraq and Syria. In the 1980s (as with other immigrants in Europe), nationalism started to develop in Belgium among the Assyrians, who have continued to be oppressed in Turkey since the Assyrian genocide during World War I.

Assyrians from Belgium, in common with other Assyrian communities around the world, have been involved in demonstrations aiming to raise awareness of the Assyrian Genocide.

== Current situation ==
Assyrians integrated into Belgian society while maintaining their cultural identity, supporting social events organized by Assyrian clubs. Assyrians in Belgium have started projects including the publishing of an Assyrian grammar book by Efrem Yildiz, the organisation of trips in association with the Association of Assyro-Chaldeans in Belgium, the production of an Assyrian movie Akitu and the founding of the Assyrian Belgian Youth (AJB). Additionally, politicians of Assyrian descent take part in Belgian politics: municipal councillors of Assyrian descent have taken office in Brussels, Etterbeek, Liège and Mechelen, including Ibrahim Erkan (Saint-Josse-ten-Noode, Christian Democrats), Sandrine Es (Etterbeek, Liberal Party) and Ibrahim Hanna (Etterbeek, Christian Democrats). New Flemish Alliance councilman Melikan Kucam is featured in Mechelen aan de Tigris (Mechelen on the Tigris), a book by Flemish author August Thiry about Assyrian refugees from Hassana in the southeastern Turkish district of Silopi.

Many Assyrians in Belgium belong to either the Chaldean Catholic Church or the Syriac Orthodox Church, with smaller numbers belonging to the Assyrian Church of the East. The first Assyrians mainly worked in factories or opened restaurants, but today, most attend university and work in all economic sectors.

== See also ==
- Assyrians in France
- Assyrians in Germany
- Assyrians in the Netherlands
