= 2025 visit by Pope Leo XIV to Turkey and Lebanon =

2025 apostolic journey

Apostolic Journey to Turkey and Lebanon
- Date: November 27 – December 2, 2025
- Location: Turkey: Ankara; Istanbul; İznik; Nicaea Lebanon: Monastery of Saint Maron; Bkerké; Port of Beirut

Pope Leo XIV visited Turkey from November 27 to 30, and Lebanon from November 30 to December 2, 2025. The trip was this pope's first apostolic journey abroad since his election in May 2025. The visit to Turkey included an ecumenical commemoration of the 1,700th anniversary of the First Council of Nicaea.

== Background ==
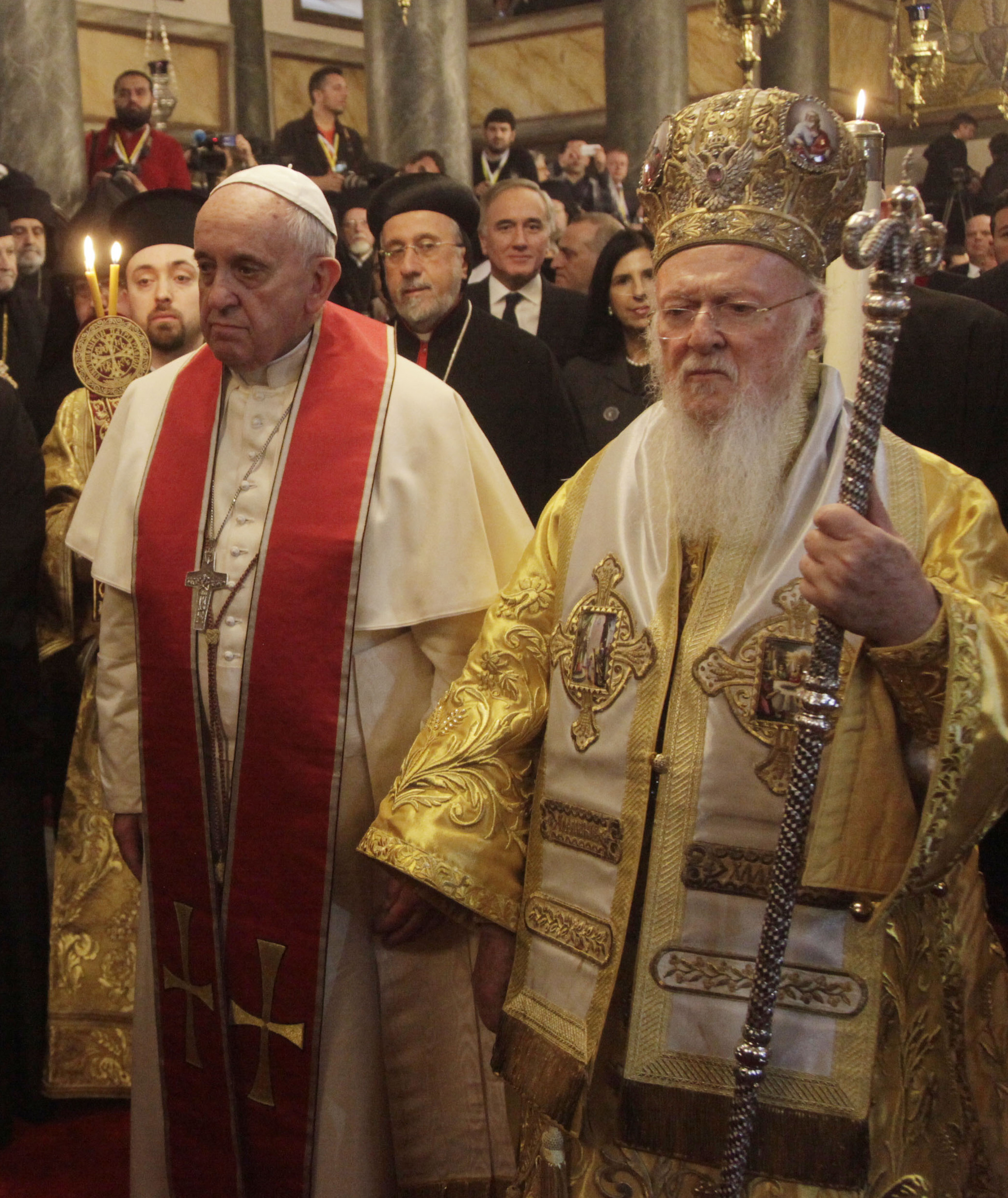
Pope Francis and Patriarch Bartholomew at the Church of the Holy Sepulchre in 2014.

=== Turkey ===
Pope Francis had intended to return to Turkey after visiting in 2014, upon the invitation of Bartholomew I of Constantinople to commemorate the 1,700th anniversary of the First Council of Nicea in İznik, but the pope died on 21 April 2025. His successor Pope Leo XIV stated from the beginning of his papacy that he intended to continue the planned visit. Other papal visits to Turkey were by Pope Paul VI in 1967, Pope John Paul II, and Pope Benedict XVI.

=== Lebanon ===
Francis also expressed his desire to visit Lebanon on multiple occasions during his papacy, but he was prevented from doing so by political instability in the nation. John Paul II was the first pope to make an extended formal visit to the nation in 1997, and Benedict XVI travelled to the country in 2012, the last apostolic visit of his papacy. In June of 2025, Joseph Aoun, the President of Lebanon, formally invited Leo to visit the nation. The journey was announced on the anniversary of the October 7 attacks by Hamas. Pope Leo's advocacy of peace during the Gaza war became more vocal following the killing of three people during Israel's missile strike on the Holy Family Church, Gaza. Israel invaded Lebanon in October 2024 in response to Hezbollah's presence in the latter which was a consequence of the ongoing conflict in the region. In an October 15 meeting with King Abdullah II and Queen Rania of Jordan, the queen enquired about the safety of the trip, to which Leo simply responded "Well, we're going."

== Itinerary ==
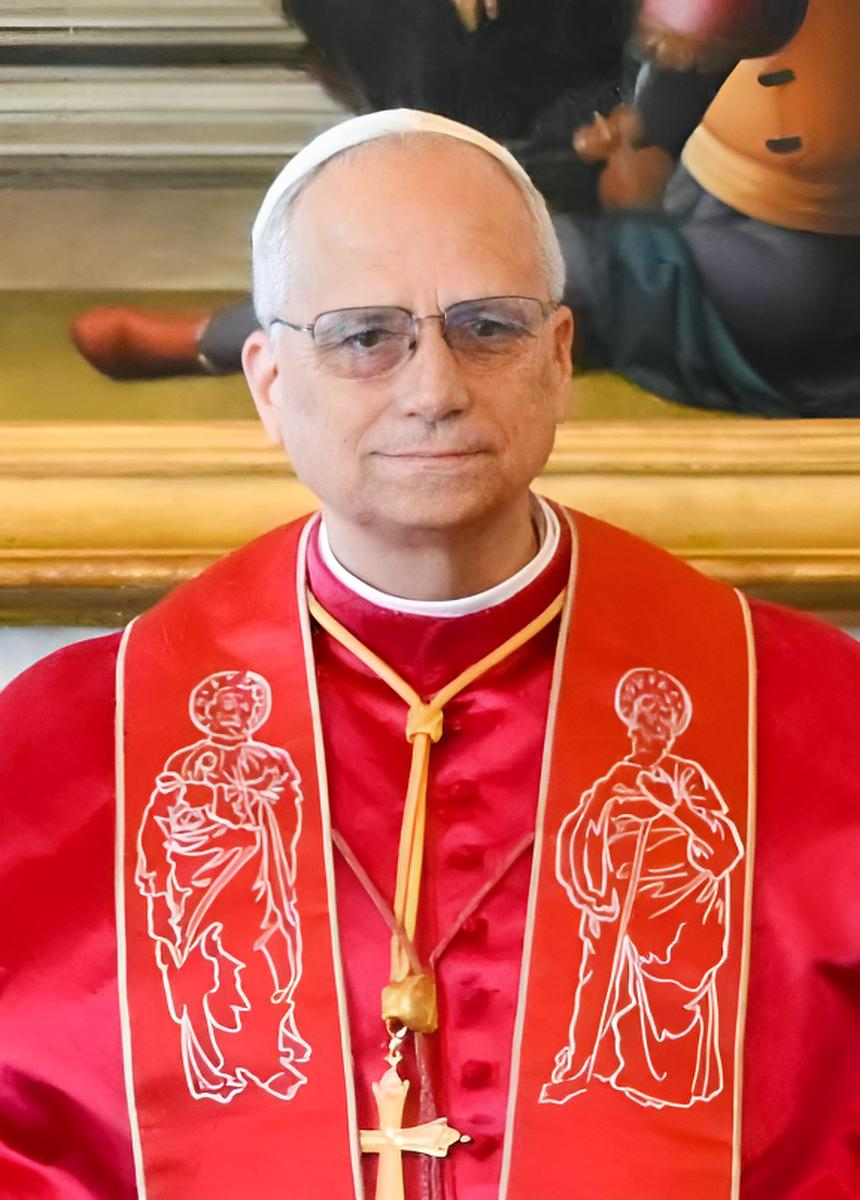
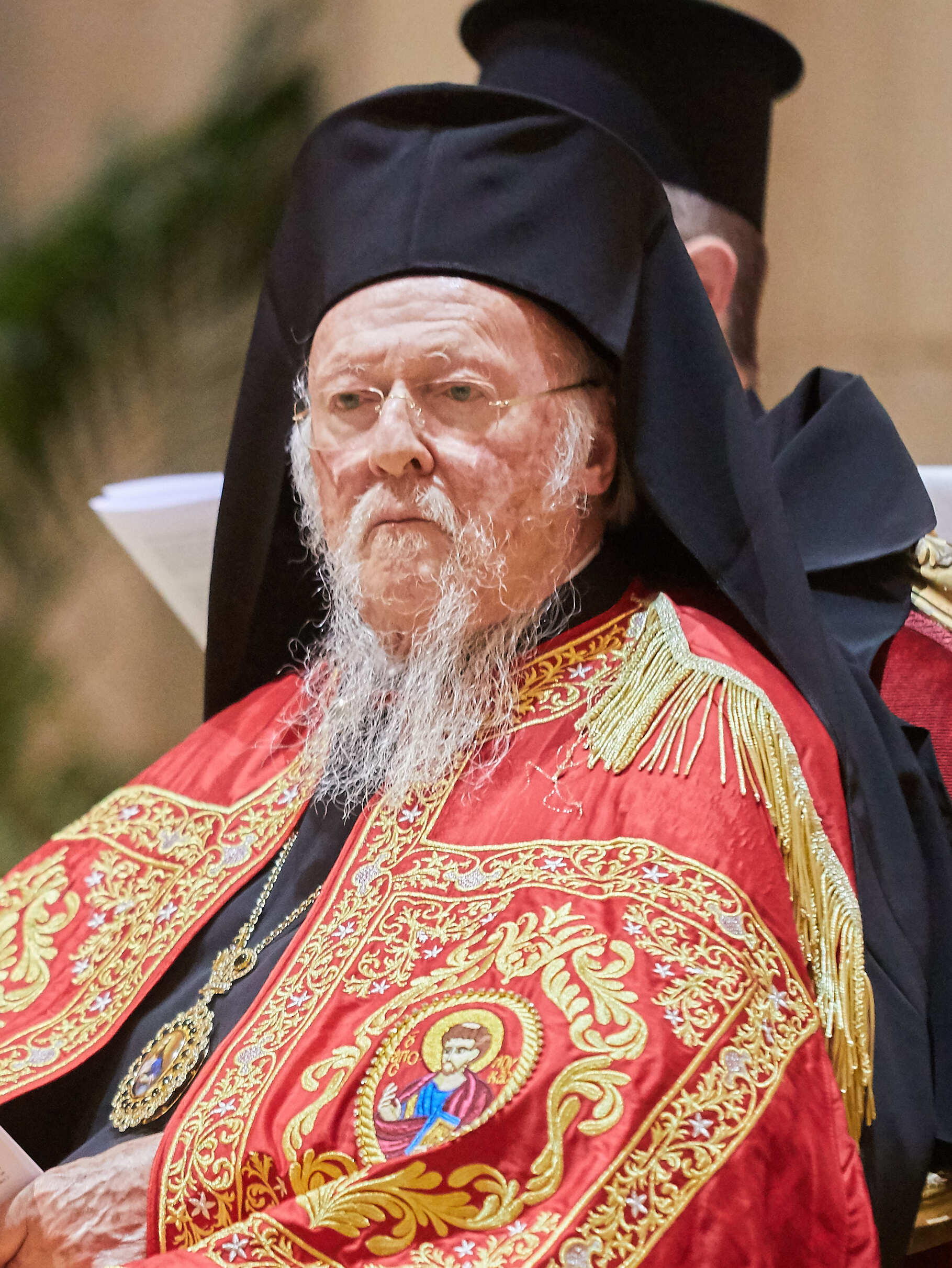
Pope Leo XIV (left) and Ecumenical Patriarch Bartholomew I (right) took part in the joint pilgrimage

=== Turkey ===
On 27 November, Pope Leo XIV departed Rome early in the morning and arrived in Ankara, where his first stop was Anıtkabir, the mausoleum of Atatürk. From there he proceeded to the Presidential Palace, where he met with President Recep Tayyip Erdoğan. He spoke with Erdoğan about the Russia–Ukraine war as well as the Israel–Gaza war. He then met with Safi Arpaguş, the head of the Presidency of Religious Affairs. After the formal events in the capital, he left Ankara in the early evening and flew to Istanbul, arriving at Atatürk Airport.

On 28 November, he began the day in Istanbul at the Cathedral of the Holy Spirit, where he met the local clergy and pastoral workers. He also visited the Nursing Home of the Little Sisters of the Poor. Later in the afternoon, he travelled by helicopter to İznik, where he joined Bartholomew for an ecumenical prayer service held near the archaeological site of the ancient Basilica of Saint Neophytos, marking the 1,700th anniversary of the First Council of Nicaea. After the service, he returned to Istanbul for further meetings at the Apostolic Delegation.

On 29 November, he remained in Istanbul, beginning with a visit to the Sultan Ahmed Mosque, his first visit to a Muslim place of worship as pope. He then went to the Mor Ephrem Syriac Orthodox Church for a private meeting with leaders of the local churches and Christian communities. In the afternoon, he was received at the Patriarchal Church of Saint George in the Phanar, where he took part in the Doxology, met with Bartholomew, and signed a joint declaration to work towards a common date for the celebration of Easter. The day concluded with Mass at the Volkswagen Arena.

On 30 November, his final day in Turkey, he visited the Armenian Apostolic Cathedral. He returned once more to the Patriarchal Church of Saint George for the Divine Liturgy and an ecumenical blessing, celebrating the feast of Andrew the Apostle. He remained at the Ecumenical Patriarchate for lunch with Bartholomew and then departed from Atatürk Airport in the afternoon, continuing his journey to Lebanon.

=== Lebanon ===
After concluding his visit to Turkey, Pope Leo XIV arrived in Beirut on the afternoon of 30 November, where he was welcomed at the Beirut International Airport before he traveled to Baabda. There, he paid courtesy visits to the President of the Republic, Joseph Aoun, followed by holding meetings with the Speaker of Parliament, Nabih Berri, the Prime Minister, Nawaf Salam, and the country's civil authorities, diplomatic corps, and representatives of Lebanese society.

On 1 December, the pope travelled north into the mountains to visit Annaya, where he prayed at the tomb of Saint Charbel Makhlouf in the Monastery of Saint Maroun. He then continued to Harissa, stopping at the Shrine of Our Lady of Lebanon to meet bishops, priests, consecrated men and women, and pastoral workers. Later, at the Apostolic Nunciature in Beirut, he held a private meeting with the Catholic Patriarchs of the East. In the afternoon, he took part in an ecumenical and interreligious gathering in Martyrs' Square. He then headed to Bkerké, the seat of the Maronite Patriarchate of Antioch, where he met with thousands of young people assembled before the patriarchal residence.

The final day of his journey, 2 December, began in Jal el Dib, where he visited the staff and patients of the "De la Croix" Hospital. He then returned to Beirut for a moment of silent prayer at the Port of Beirut, honoring the victims of the devastating 2020 explosion. Afterwards, he celebrated Mass on the Beirut Waterfront for 150,000 faithful from across Lebanon. That afternoon, after a farewell ceremony at the airport, Pope Leo departed Beirut and returned to Rome, concluding his three-day visit to the country.
