= Mor Dimet Church =

Syriac Orthodox church in Midyat, Turkey

- Mor Dimet Kilisesi
- ܥܕܬܐ ܕܡܪܝ ܕܝܡܛ
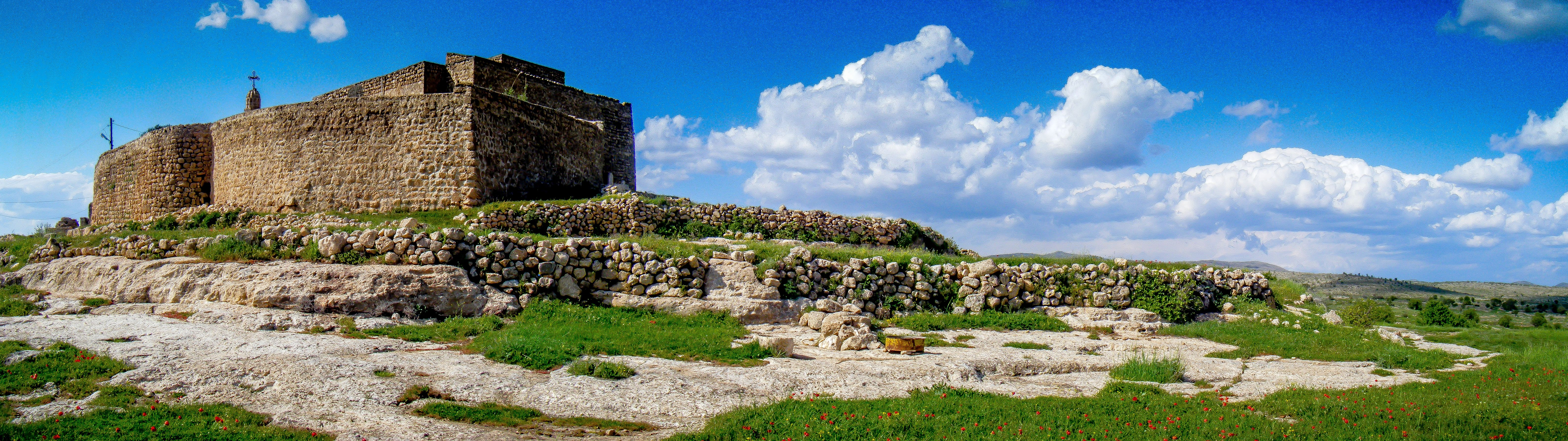
- Mor Dimet Church
- Mor Dimet Church
- 37.51314°N 41.53717°E
- Location: İzbırak
- Country: Turkey
- Language: Syriac language
- Denomination: Syriac Orthodox

History
- Status: Church
- Dedication: Saint Dimet

Architecture
- Completed: Early Christianity

Administration
- District: Midyat
- Province: Mardin

The Mor Dimet Church (Turkish: Mor Dimet Kilisesi, Syriac: ܥܕܬܐ ܕܡܪܝ ܕܝܡܛ, romanized: ʿyta d mr) is a Syriac Orthodox church in Midyat, Mardin Province, southeastern Turkey. The Early Christianity church was restored, and reopened in 2021.

The Mor Dimet Church is a Syriac Orthodox church built in Early Christianity and located at the village (administratively: a neighborhood) of İzbırak (in Syriac: Zāz) in Midyat district, Mardin Province, southeastern Turkey.

Once, around one hundred Assyrian Turkish families lived in the village. In the early 1990s, the Assyrians of the last Zaz village in the Tur Abdin region left their village due to terrorist attacks. Following the emigration of the villagers to Europe and the United States, the village turned into a ghost town in 1993. A priest and a nun have been living in the church for years, and protected the village. In 2001, a house and a bell tower were built in the church courtyard. The government decided the demolition of these additional structures in 2012.

The Assyrians, who returned home when peace was established in the region, started a project for the restoration of the church. After two years of work, the church was reopened for worship on 26 September 2021. A ceremonial worship took place on 11 October 2021 attended by the Midyat Metropolit and guest priests from various European countries.

There are various dates about when the church was built. Some sources give the date of completion as the 4th century, the 5th century, the time when the Assyrians accepted Christianity, or 7th century.

Gabriel Rabo from the University of Göttingen in Germany, a former village resident, states that "there are also Akkadian cuneiform reliefs on the church building's outer walls, dating back to pre-Christian times. The name of Zaz village was mentioned as 'Zazabukha' in other tablets, and that this region was used as a military headquarters in a tablet dating back to 879 BC."
