= Killing of Ashur Sarnaya =

2025 murder in Lyon, France

- Location: Lyon, France
- Date: 10 September 2025
- Attack type: Stabbing; Assassination

On 10 September 2025, Ashur Sarnaya, a 45-year-old disabled Assyrian Christian from Iraq, was stabbed to death in Lyon, France while doing a livestream on TikTok about Christianity.

== Background ==
Born in 1979, Ashur Sarnaya was originally from Ankawa, a Chaldean–Syriac–Assyrian district of Erbil. Sarnaya and his family fled as refugees to France after the Islamic State invaded Iraq.

Sarnaya was known for hosting live sessions on TikTok where he would discuss Christianity and criticize Islamic groups. This led to Sarnaya receiving death threats, and he was attacked in March 2025.

== Killing ==
According to a witness, a man was waiting for Sarnaya, who was in a wheelchair, at the bottom of his building before stabbing him in the carotid artery and fleeing. Sarnaya was livestreaming on TikTok at the time of the attack, and captured footage showed his face covered in blood coming from his nose and mouth.

Emergency services were notified shortly before 10:30 P.M. that an attack had occurred on 53 rue Sergent Michel Berthet in the 9th arrondissement. There, Sarnaya was found stabbed in the neck and suffering from cardiorespiratory arrest. Emergency responders were unable to revive him.

Another source stated that three perpetrators were said to have been present, dressed in dark clothing with hoods, and fled the scene immediately without being caught.

== Aftermath ==
A 28 year old man of Algerian origin was arrested near Bari, Italy, on 2 October 2025, as a suspect to the murder after French judicial authorities issued a European arrest warrant against him.

== Responses ==
Sarnaya's sister was notified of the attack by friends who were watching the live stream. She stated "I went out to do some shopping, and when I came home, I saw that all my friends had called me several times. They told me to go see what was going on. When I got there, he was dead. He was on the ground, there were lots of people, the police, the firefighters...Ashur was a normal person. He went live on TikTok to spread the word of God. He had no enemies, no problems with anyone,".

One of Sarnaya's relatives said that "[Sarnaya] was preaching live when his life was tragically taken...he spent his last moments doing exactly what he loved: spreading the Gospel. In my opinion, he is a martyr and his faith will always be an inspiration."

The president of the Assyro-Chaldean Association of Lyon, Georges Shamoun Ishaq, stated that Sarnaya was “a very kind, discreet person, deeply believing, who liked to speak about the Christian faith".

The Catholic association Œuvre d'Orient stated that it "condemns in the strongest terms the murder of an Iraqi Christian in a vulnerable situation” and awaits "the conclusions of the investigation as quickly as possible…It is essential that Christians in the Middle East can bear witness to their faith in complete safety and live with dignity," the association added, assuring "the family and the Iraqi community in France of its deepest compassion."

Lyon's deputy security chief, Mohamed Chihi, denounced the act as "a heinous crime" and stated hope that investigators would “uncover the circumstances of the case as soon as possible.”

French politician Marine Le Pen said that Sarnaya "was savagely stabbed to death in Lyon by an Islamist. While granting asylum to the persecuted is legitimate, our uncontrolled immigration policy now leads us to welcome their executioners".

Lyon-based influencer Verlaine paid tribute to Sarnaya stating "A thought tonight for Achour, 45 years old, who gets around in a wheelchair, fatally stabbed in the neck last night at the foot of his building, in the 9th arrondissement of Lyon. Of Iraqi origin, Achour was very active on social media, where he notably displayed his Catholic faith...Rest in peace, sir".
