= Assyrians in France =

French citizens of Assyrian ancestry

ܣܘܪܝܝܐ ܕܦܪܲܢܓܝܵܐ
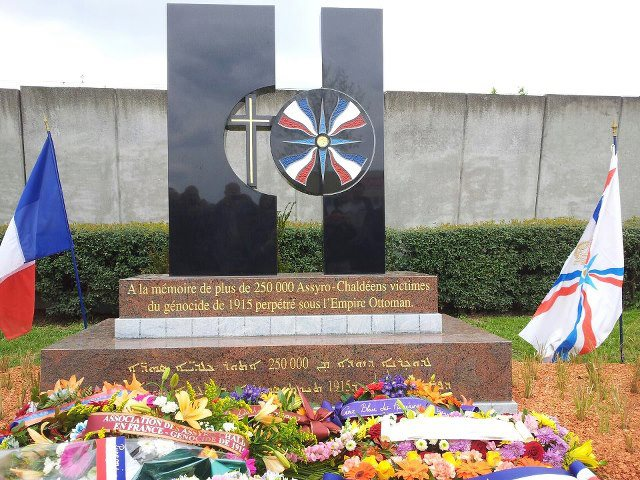
- Memorial of the Assyrian genocide in Paris

Total population
- 30,000 - 40,000

Regions with significant populations
- Paris, Lyon, Marseille, Toulouse

Languages
- Neo-Aramaic and French

Religion
- Chaldean Catholic, Syriac Orthodox , Assyrian Church of the East

French Assyrians (Syriac: ܣܘܪܝܝܐ ܕܦܪܲܢܓܝܵܐ, French: Assyriens) are French citizens of Assyrian ancestry. There are around 30,000 - 40,000 most of whom are concentrated in the Paris metropolitan area.

== History ==
The community has a history in France dating back to the First World War, with most arriving during the 1920s in Marseille as a result of the Assyrian genocide.

The bulk of the Assyrian presence dates back to the early 20th century, when some Assyrians, fleeing the Assyrian genocide, found refuge in France. Others arrived from rural south-eastern Turkey (especially Mardin, Tur Abdin, Şırnak and Siirt) as a result of the Kurdish–Turkish conflict in the 1960s and 70s. Their numbers swelled after the Iraq War in 2003 by those arriving from Iraqi cities.

== Population ==
There are 30,000 - 40,000 Assyrians living in France. The first Assyrians arrived in Marseille France in the 1920s as refugees from the genocide of the Assyrians by Turks during World War One, in which up to 275,000 Assyrians were killed, as well as 1 million Greeks and 1.5 million Armenians. Around 10,000 of Assyrians live in Sarcelles, a suburb of Paris. They are generally compared to French Jews who are seen as inward-looking, conservative and well-integrated in the French society. 10,000 (of 16,000) Assyrians live in Sarcelles.

== Notable French Assyrians ==
- Maria Theresa Asmar
- François David
- Henri Jibrayel
- Agha Petros
- Ashur Sarnaya
- Pascal Esho Warda

== See also ==
- The Last Assyrians
- Assyrians in Belgium
