= Assyrians in Turkey =

Ethnic group in the Republic of Turkey

Turkish Assyrians
ܣܘܪܝܝܐ ܕܛܘܪܩܝܐ (Syriac)
- (Assyrian homeland) (Turkey)
- Turkish Assyrian Christians in Beytüşşebap

Total population
- 30,000

Regions with significant populations
- Istanbul, parts of Midyat, Gercüş, Şırnak province Cities of Hakkâri, Mardin and Yüksekova; Southeastern Anatolia Region (historically)

Languages
- Suret, Surayt, Turkish

Religion
- Syriac Christianity

Assyrians in Turkey (Turkish: Türkiye Süryanileri, Syriac: ܣܘܪܝܝܐ ܕܛܘܪܩܝܐ) or Turkish Assyrians are an indigenous Semitic-speaking ethnic group and a minority of Turkey, who are Eastern Aramaic–speaking Christians, with most being members of the Syriac Orthodox Church, Chaldean Catholic Church, Assyrian Pentecostal Church, Assyrian Evangelical Church, or Ancient Church of the East.

They share a common history and ethnic identity, rooted in shared linguistic, cultural and religious traditions, with Assyrians in Iraq, Assyrians in Iran and Assyrians in Syria, as well as with the Assyrian diaspora. Assyrians in such European countries as Sweden and Germany would usually be Turoyo-speakers or Western Assyrians, and tend to be originally from Turkey.

The Assyrians were once a large ethnic minority in the Ottoman Empire, living in the Hakkari, Sirnak and Mardin provinces, but, following the Sayfo (1915, also known as the Assyrian genocide), most were murdered or expelled to northern Iraq, northeast Syria, and northwest Iran, to join their fellow Assyrians. Most of those who survived the genocide and stayed in Turkey left the country for Western Europe in the 2nd half of the 20th century, due to conflicts between the Kurdistan Workers' Party (PKK) and the Turkish Land Forces. As of 2019, an estimated 18,000 of the country's 25,000 Assyrians live in Istanbul. According to Yusuf Çetin, Spiritual Leader of the Syriac Orthodox Community, as of 2023, there are 25,000-30,000 Assyrians in Turkey, including 17,000 to 22,000 in Istanbul, most of them in Yeşilköy, where the new Mor Ephrem Syriac Orthodox Church was inaugurated on 8 October 2023.

== History ==
=== Ottoman era ===
Percentage of the prewar population that was Assyrian, presented by the Assyro-Chaldean delegation to the 1919 peace conference. More than 50% 30–40% 20–30% 10–20% 5–10%

Map of Assyrian settlements in their homeland, Tur Abdin

The Ottoman Empire had an elaborate system of administering the non-Muslim "People of the Book." That is, they made allowances for accepted monotheists with a scriptural tradition and distinguished them from people they defined as pagans. As People of the Book (or dhimmi), Jews, Christians and Mandaeans (in some cases Zoroastrians) received second-class treatment but were tolerated.

In the Ottoman Empire, this religious status became systematized as the "millet" administrative pattern. Each religious minority answered to the government through its chief religious representative. The Christians that the Ottomans conquered gradually but definitively with the conquest of Constantinople in 1453 were already divided into many ethnic groups and denominations, usually organized into a hierarchy of bishops headed by a patriarch.

As for the 5 Assyrian Tribes of Hakkari, The Shimun Patriarchate in Qodshanis, who the Tribes worshipped because it was the Assyrian Church of the East's Holy See: was directly subservient to the Sublime Porte, who the see paid the taxes to which they collected from the tribes.

Those who had converted to Protestantism did not want to pay an annual tribute to the older churches through local bishops who then passed some of it up to the Patriarch who then passed some of it to the Porte in the form of taxes. They wanted to deal directly with the Porte, across ethnic lines (even if through a Muslim administrator), in order to have their own voice and not be subjected to the rule of the Patriarchal system. This general Protestant charter was granted in 1850.

During the Second Bedirkhanis Revolt, a Kurdish revolt which erupted during the Russo-Turkish War of 1877 to 1878, the Syriac-Assyrians under the leadership of Hanne Safar provided significant military support to the Ottoman Empire. For his assistance and loyalty throughout the revolt, Hanne Safar was later honored by the Sultan himself, Abdülhamid II, with the title of Pasha and was presented with a consecrated sword. Despite the region around Midyat avoiding the Hamidian massacres, Assyrians of other areas such as Diyarbakir were less fortunate, which resulted in the death of approximately 25,000 Assyrians during the Massacres of Diyarbakir in 1895.

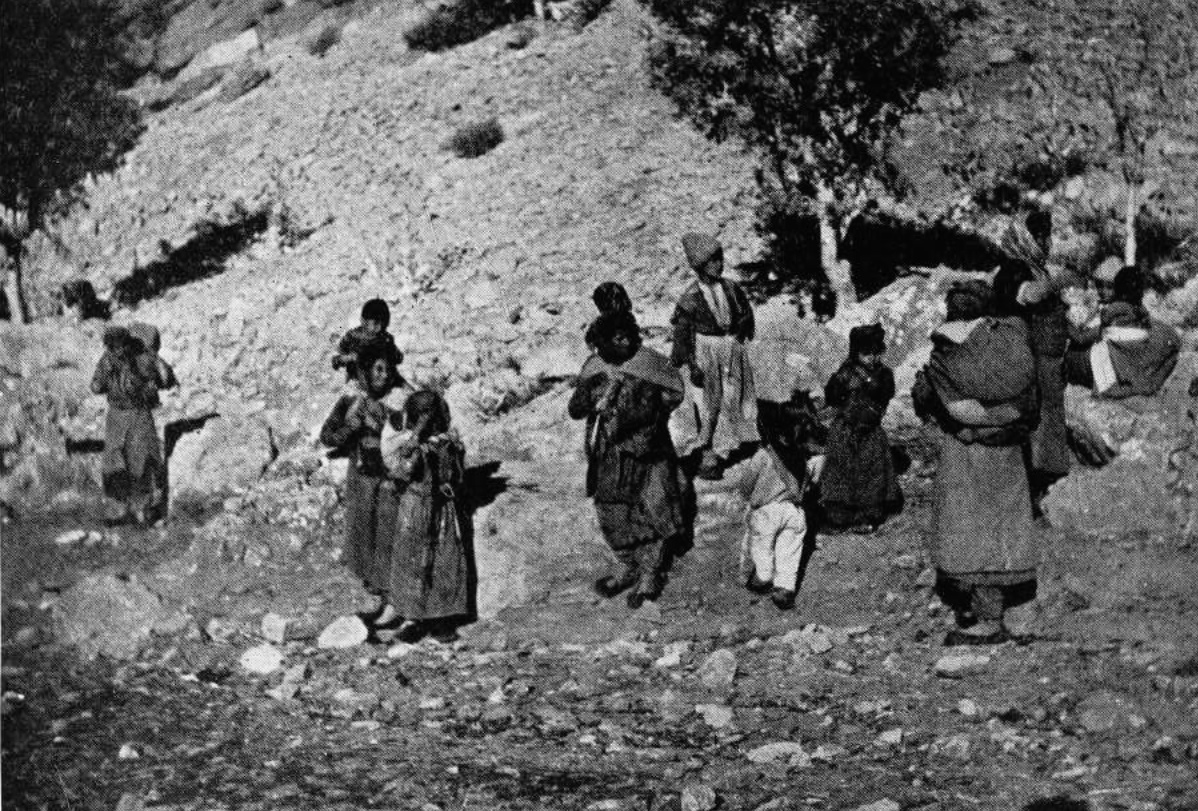
Assyrian women fleeing through the mountains during Sayfo, 1915

Gaunt has estimated the Assyrian population at between 500,000 and 600,000 just before the outbreak of World War I, significantly higher than reported on Ottoman census figures. Midyat, in Diyarbekir vilayet, was the only town in the Ottoman Empire with an Assyrian majority, although divided between Syriac Orthodox, Chaldeans, and Protestants. Syriac Orthodox Christians were concentrated in the hilly rural areas around Midyat, known as Tur Abdin, where they populated almost 100 villages and worked in agriculture or crafts. Syriac Orthodox culture was centered in two monasteries near Mardin (west of Tur Abdin), Mor Gabriel and Deyrulzafaran. Outside of the area of core Syriac settlement, there were also sizable populations in the towns of Diyarbakır, Urfa, Harput, and Adiyaman as well as villages. Unlike the Syriac population of Tur Abdin, many of these Syriacs spoke other languages.

Under the leadership of the Patriarch of the Church of the East, based in Qudshanis, Assyrian tribes ruled the Hakkari mountains (east of Tur Abdin, adjacent to the Ottoman–Persian border) with aşiret status—in theory granting them full autonomy—with subordinated farmers. Hakkari is very mountainous with peaks reaching up to 4,000 metres (13,000 ft) separated by steep gorges, such that many areas could only be accessed by footpaths carved into the side of mountains. The Assyrian tribes sometimes fought each other on behalf of their Kurdish allies. Church of the East settlement began to the east on the western shore of Lake Urmia in Persia, in the town of Urmia and surrounding villages; just north, in Salamas, was a Chaldean enclave. There was a small Chaldean area around Siirt in Bitlis vilayet (northeast of Tur Abdin and northwest of Hakkari), which was mountainous but less so than Hakkari, but the bulk of Chaldeans lived farther south, in modern-day Iraq and outside of the zone that suffered genocide during World War I. Orthodox Christian Assyrians made up 99% of the Assyrians within the borders of modern-day Türkiye.

=== Republic of Turkey ===
After 1923, local politicians went on an anti-Christian campaign that negatively affected the Syriac communities (such as Adana, Urfa or Adiyaman) that had not been affected by the 1915 genocide. Many were forced to abandon their properties and flee to Syria, eventually settling in Aleppo, Qamishli, or the Khabur. The Syriac Orthodox patriarchate was expelled from Turkey in 1924, despite its declarations of loyalty to the new Turkish government. Unlike Armenians, Jews, and Greeks, Assyrians were not recognized as a minority group in the 1923 Treaty of Lausanne. The remaining population lived in submission to Kurdish aghas, and were subjected to constant harassment and abuse which pushed them to emigrate. Turkish laws denaturalized those who had fled and confiscated their property. Despite their actual citizenship rights, many Assyrians who remained in Turkey had to re-purchase their own properties from Kurdish aghas or risk losing their Turkish citizenship. Some Assyrians continued to live in Tur Abdin until the 1980s; this was the last substantial Christian population in Turkey living rurally in its original homeland. Some scholars have described ongoing exclusion and harassment of Syriacs in Turkey as a continuation of the Sayfo.

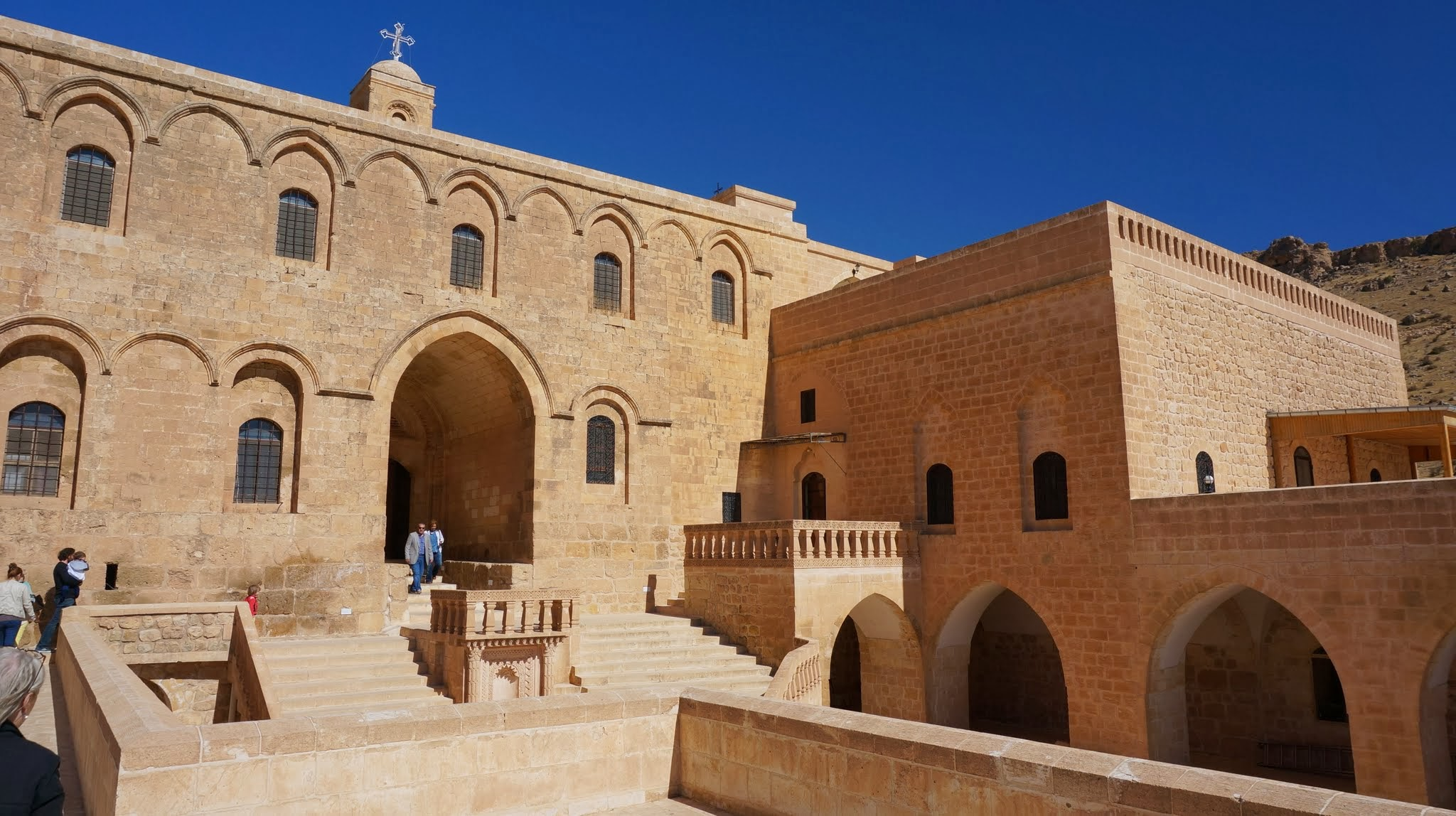
Mor Hananyo Monastery is an important Syriac Orthodox monastery in Tur Abdin, Turkey.

Unlike other persecuted Christian groups like the Greeks and Armenians, the Assyrian community of Turkey managed to sustain its numbers after the Assyrian Genocide but they had many hardships nevertheless. In the 1960s, it became increasingly unsafe for Assyrians/Syriacs in Midyat, the regional centre of Tur Abdin. Muslims incited violent anti-Christian protests as a response to events unfolding in Cyprus. This led to many Assyro-Syriacs not seeing a future for themselves in their ancestral homeland. By the 1980s the Assyrian population of Turkey was around 70,000 people, although down from the 300,000 or so in total who survived after the genocide. The currently diminished number of 28,000 Assyrians today was caused largely due to Kurdish insurgencies in the 1980s and the bad state of most of the Middle East, along with the forever looming issue of Turkish governmental discrimination. By the end of the conflict in the late 1990s, less than 1,000 Assyrians were still in Tur Abdin or Hakkari, with the rest living in Istanbul.

In 2001, the Turkish government invited Assyrians/Syriacs to return to Turkey, but some speculate that the offer was more of a publicity stunt, as a land law passed a short time before caused Assyrians who owned untilled farms or land with forests on them (which a large amount did, as those in diaspora could not till or maintain the properties they owned while living elsewhere) to have the land they owned confiscated by the state and sold to third parties. Another law made it illegal for non-Turkish nationals to purchase land in Mardin province, where most Assyrians would have immigrated to. Regardless of those laws a few did come, such as those who still had their citizenship and could buy property and managed to avoid having their land taken – but many more who could have come back could not due to the laws passed.

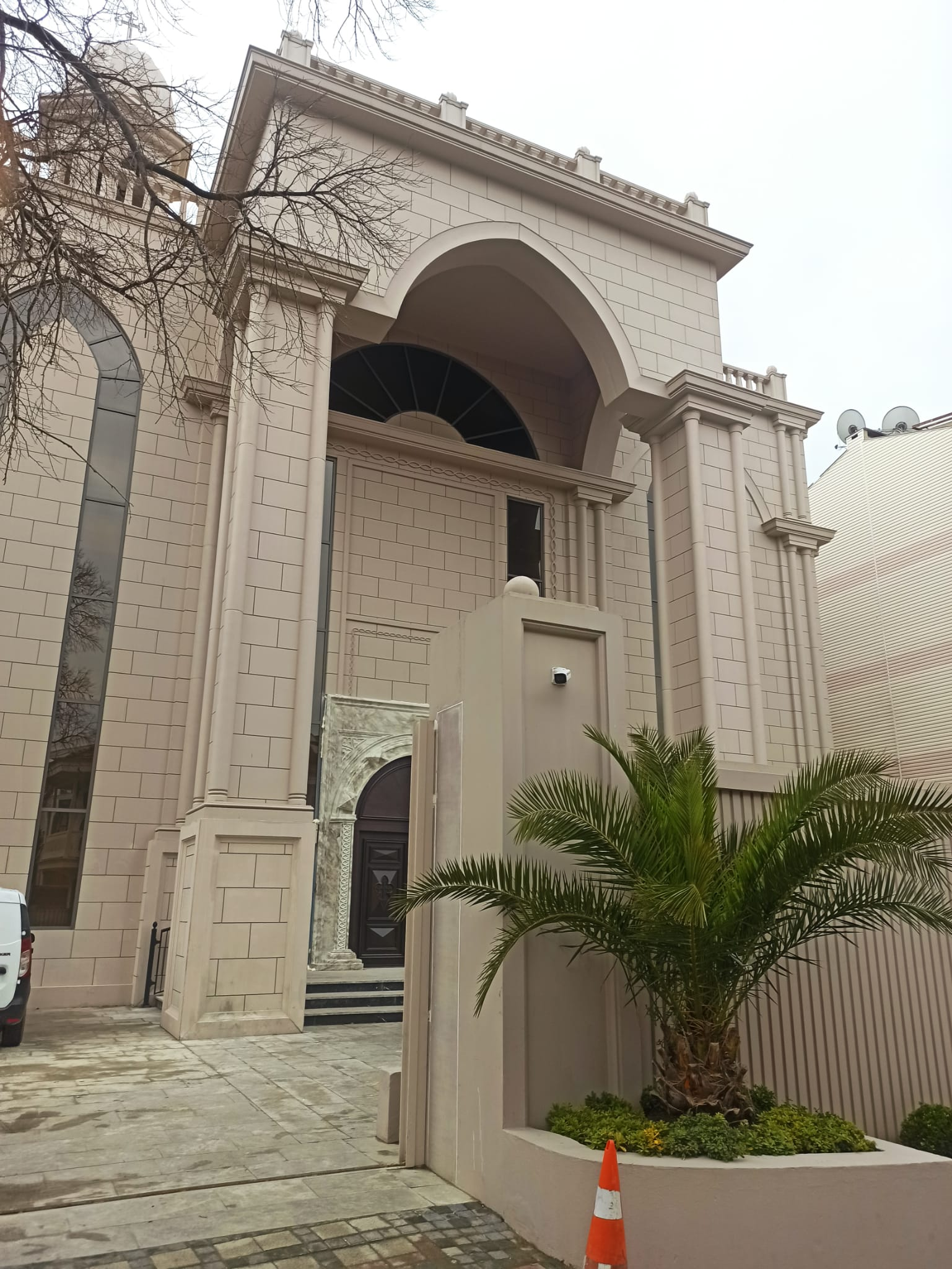
Mor Ephrem Syriac Orthodox Church, the first church built since the foundation of the Republic of Turkey

Some Assyrians who have fled from ISIL have found temporary homes in the city of Midyat. A refugee center is located near Midyat, but due to there being a small Assyrian community in Midyat, many of the Assyrian refugees at the camp went to Midyat hoping for better conditions than the refugee camp had. Many refugees were given help and accommodation by the local Assyrian community there, perhaps wishing that the refugees stay, as the community in Midyat is in need of more members.

In 2013, Assyrians were allowed to open the first school operating in their mother tongue since 1928. The same year, 55 Syriac churches, monasteries, and cemeteries in Mardin Province confiscated by the Turkish state were returned to them. On 8 October 2023, the Mor Ephrem Syriac Orthodox Church opened, the first church built since the foundation of the Republic of Turkey. As of 2023, the Syriac community owns 113 properties registered in the name of community foundations.

== Language ==
Unlike Armenians, Jews, and Greeks, Assyrians were not recognized as a minority group in the 1923 Treaty of Lausanne and could not open schools teaching their language. The last Assyrian-language school was closed in 1928.

On 18 June 2013, the Ankara 13th Circuit Administrative Court ruled in favor of Assyrians' right to use their mother tongue as stated in the Treaty of Lausanne. The Ministry of Education accepted the decision and a first kindergarten opened in 2014. In 2023, Recep Tayyip Erdoğan announced the opening of a new Assyrian school, funded by the government.

Classical Syriac and modern Surayt are taught are Mardin Artuklu University.

In a 2017 survey, 64% of Assyrians in Istanbul declared "Assyrian" as their mother tongue, while 27% declared Turkish.

== Religion ==
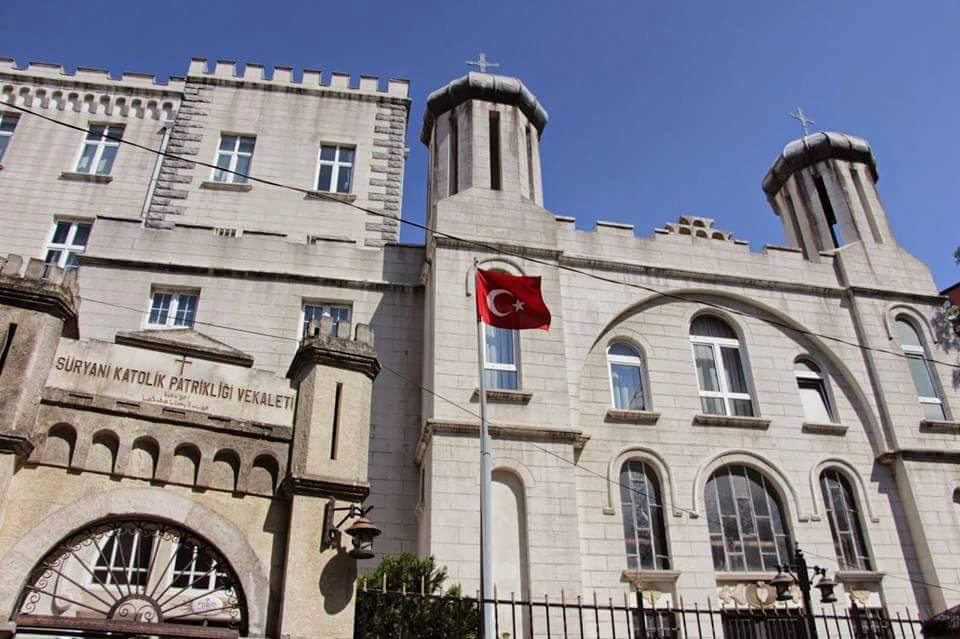
Syriac Catholic Church in Istanbul

The Assyrians are an ethnic group divided into a variety of different Christian churches, and those churches vary dramatically in liturgy and structure, and even dictate identity (see Terms for Syriac Christians). The predominant Christian denomination among Assyrians in Turkey is the Syriac Orthodox Church, with their 15,000–20,000 followers being called Syriacs. Due to migration, the Syriacs' main residential area in Turkey today is Istanbul, where between 12,000 and 18,000 live. Between 2,000 and 3,000 Syriac Orthodoxs still live in Tur Abdin, and they are spread among 30 villages, hamlets, and towns. Some of these locations are dominated by Syriacs while others are dominated by the Kurds. Additionally, there are a few Syriac Orthodox Christian communities in İzmir, Ankara, İskenderun, Diyarbakir, Adıyaman, Malatya, Elazığ, and a few other places. As part of the return movement some Syriac Orthodox returned to Tur Abdin villages from Germany, Sweden and Switzerland.

The second largest denomination is the Chaldean Catholic Church in Turkey, which has around 7,000–8,000 members who live primarily in Diyarbakir, Mardin, Sirnak province, and Istanbul. In 2016 it was estimated that there were about 48,594 Chaldean Catholics in Turkey. Diyarbakir was the city in which the Chaldean Catholic Church was founded when it separated in 1552 from the Assyrian Church of the East. Prior to the Sayfo there was also a large community of Nestorians, or followers of the Assyrian Church of the East, and Syriac Catholics. The Nestorian Tribes lived in the Hakkari mountains on the southeastern edge of Turkey's border, which is now part of the modern day Sirnak and Hakkari provinces. Additionally, the Patriarch of the Nestorian church had his See until mid-1915 based in a village in that region known as Qodshanis after he and his followers settled there in the 1660s, making Turkey the center of their church structure.

The Syriac Catholic Church had their See in Mardin during the 1800s after being driven out of Aleppo due to oppression by the Syriac Orthodox Church. A large community lived in the southeast in the Tur Abdin region until they were massacred and forced to flee during the Sayfo to Lebanon, where the See was reestablished. There is still a tiny Syriac Catholic community that lives in Mardin and Istanbul, but most Syriac Catholics now live in Iraq, Syria, and Lebanon. Syriac Protestant Churches exist in Turkey as well.

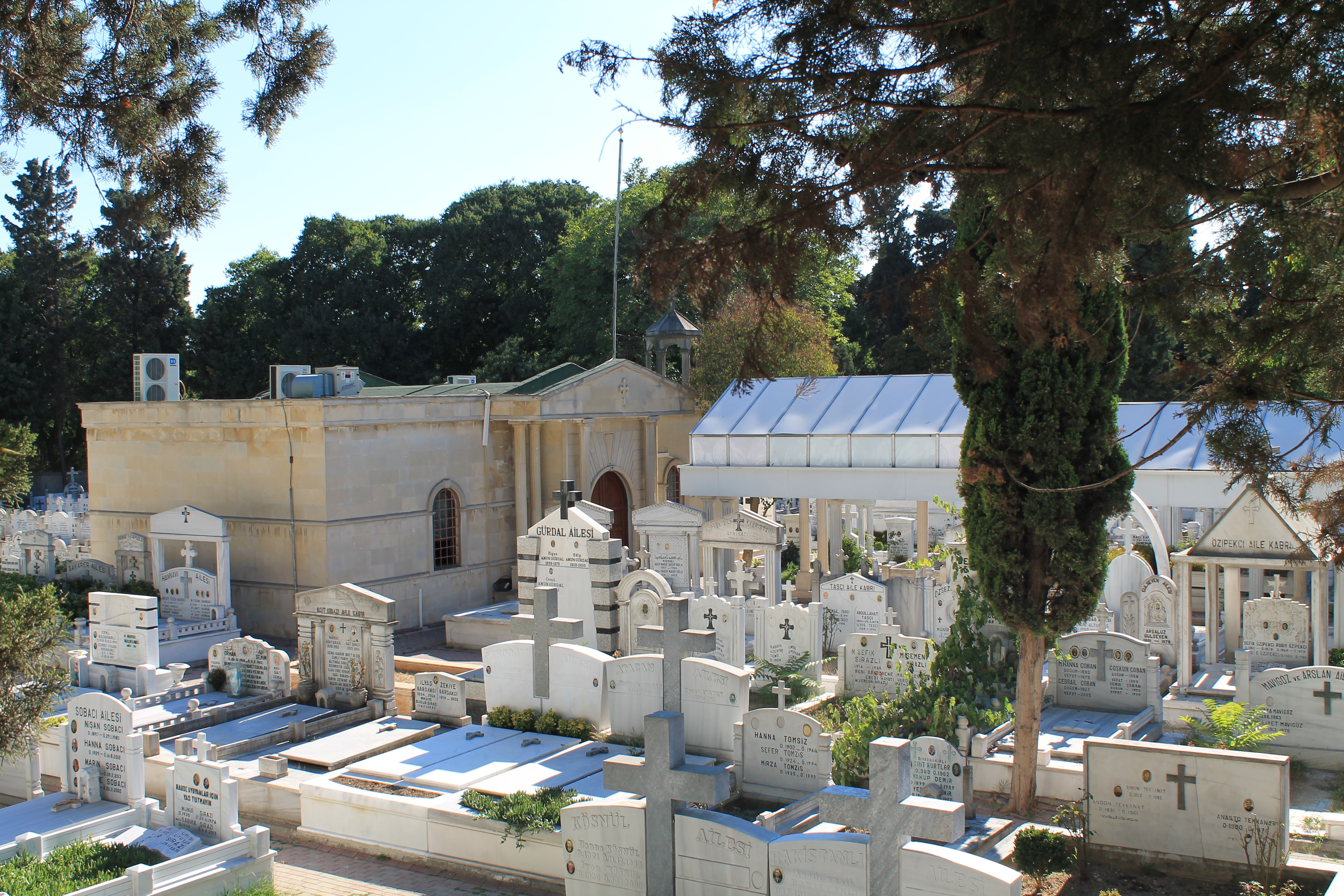
Syriac Orthodox Church and Cemetery in Istanbul

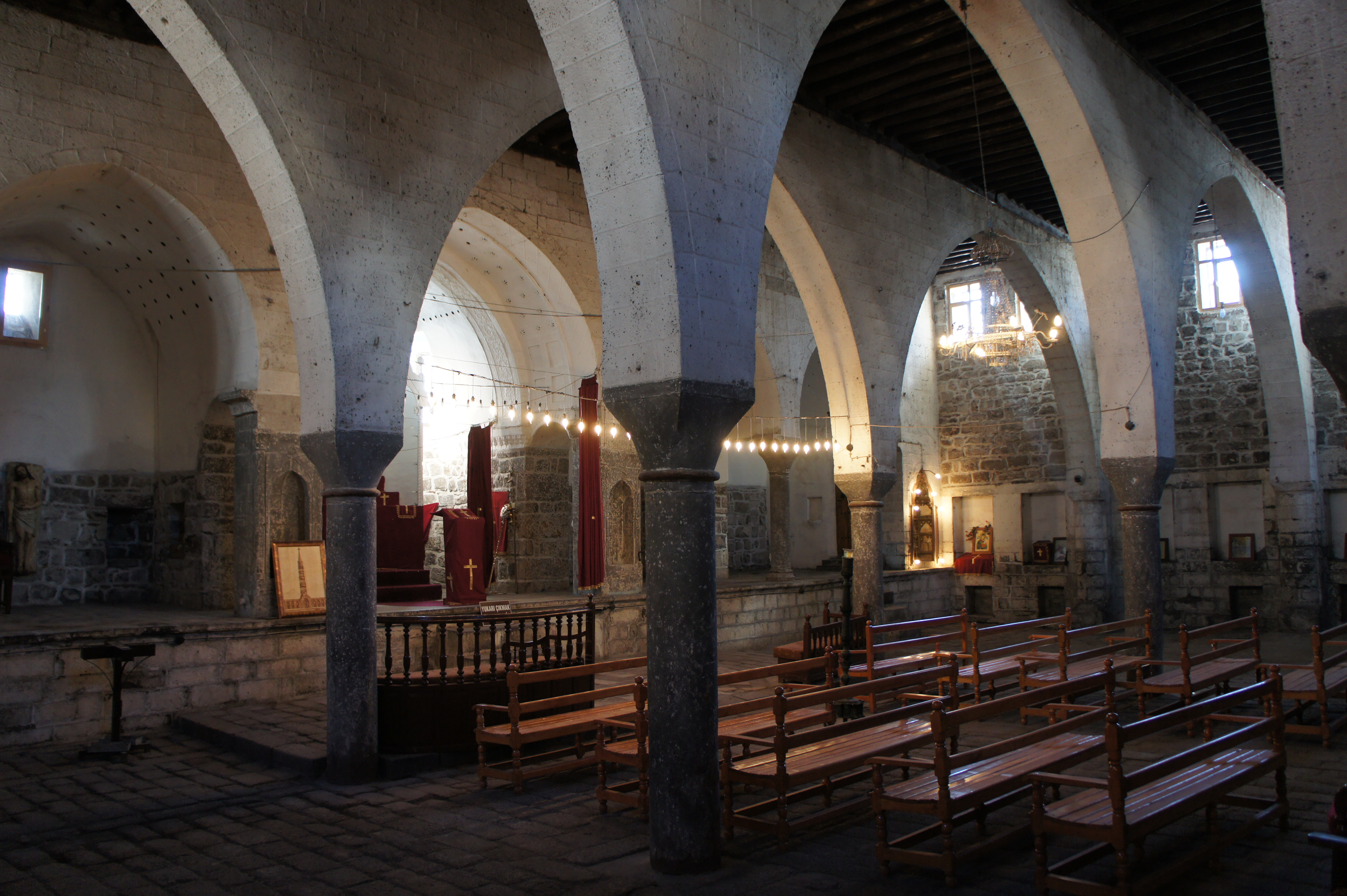
Mar Pithyoun (St. Anthony) Chaldean Catholic Church in Diyarbakır

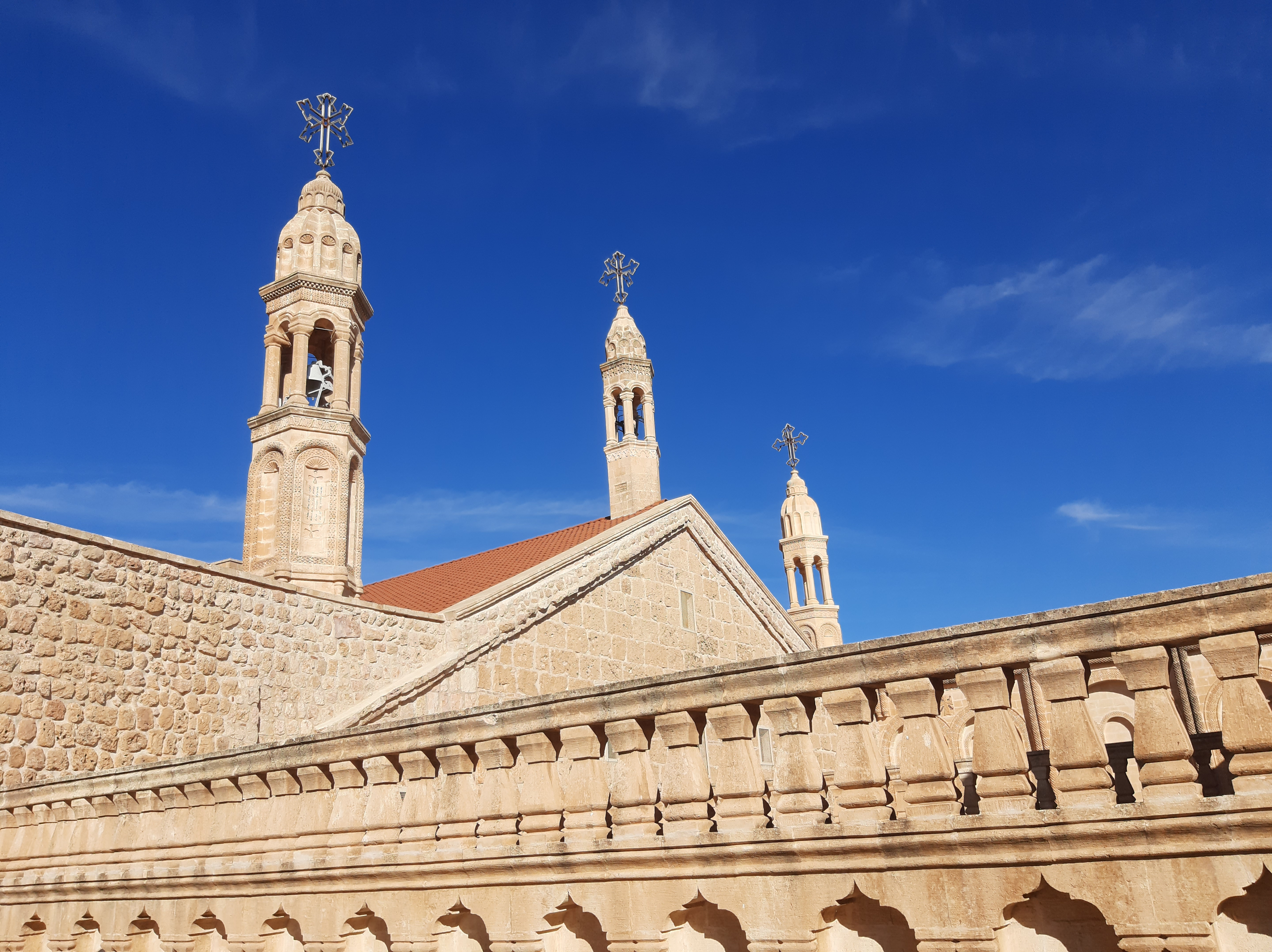
Mor Gabriel Monastery in Tur Abdin

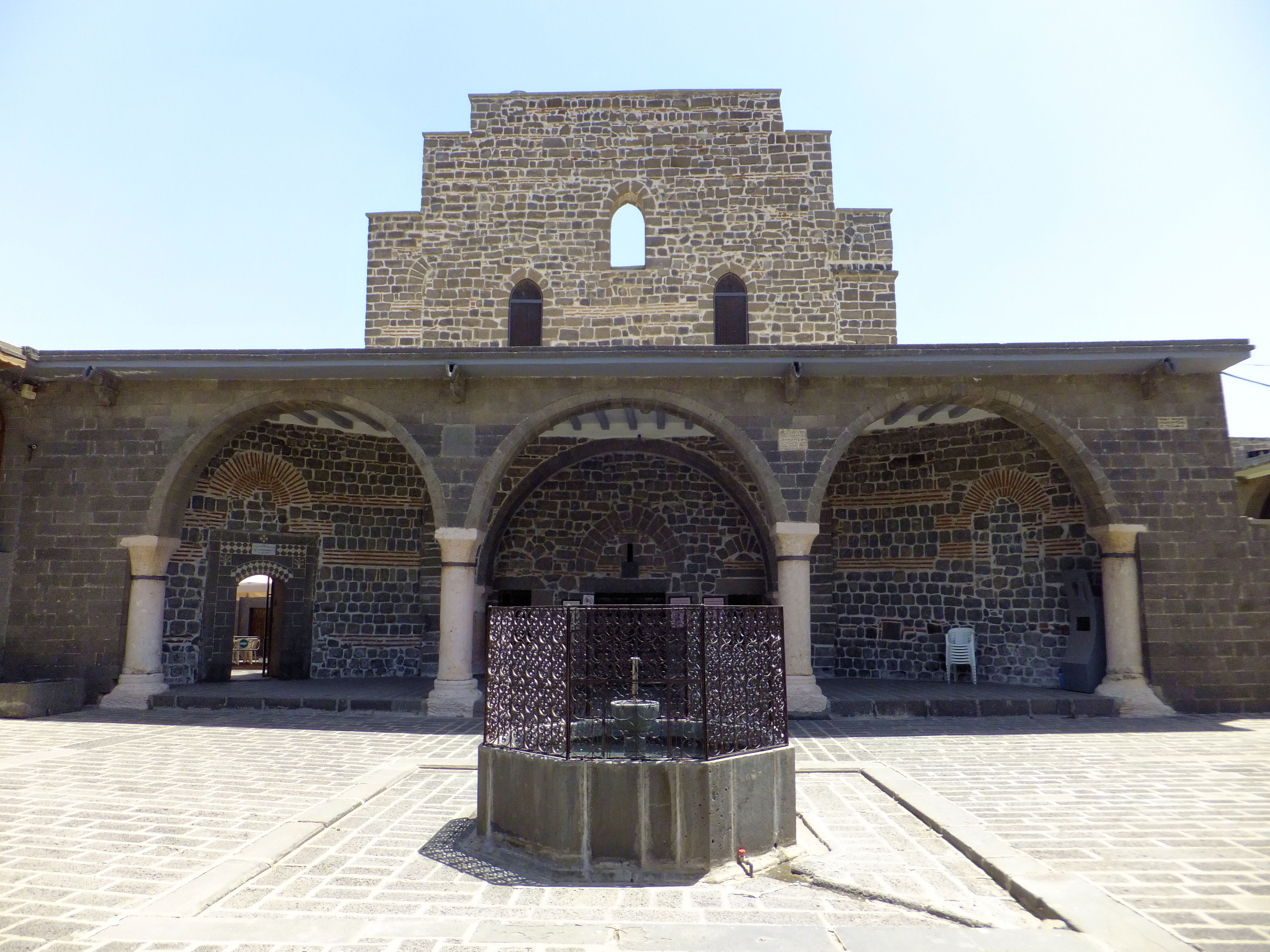
St. Mary Church, Diyarbakır

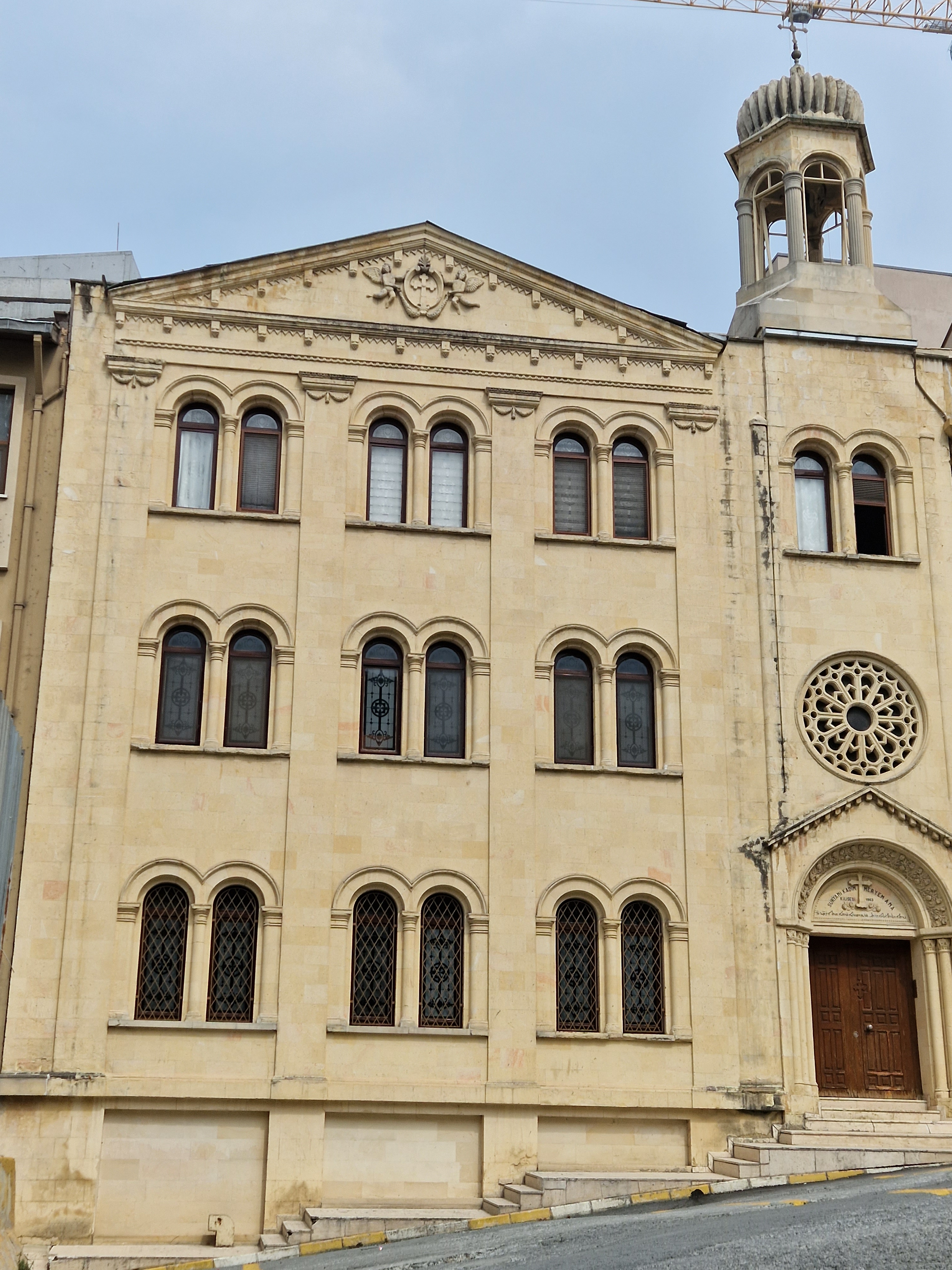
Syriac Orthodox Church of the Virgin Mary, Istanbul

== See also ==
- Assyrian homeland
- Christianity in Turkey
- Minorities in Turkey

== Sources ==
- Gaunt, David; Atto, Naures; Barthoma, Soner O. (2017). "Introduction: Contextualizing the Sayfo in the First World War". Let Them Not Return: Sayfo - The Genocide Against the Assyrian, Syriac, and Chaldean Christians in the Ottoman Empire. Berghahn Books. pp. 1–32. ISBN 978-1-78533-499-3.
- Hooglund, Eric (2008). "The Society and Its Environment" (PDF). In Curtis, Glenn E.; Hooglund, Eric (eds.). Iran: A Country Study. Area Handbook Series. United States Library of Congress, Federal Research Division (5th ed.). Washington, D.C.: United States Government Printing Office. pp. 81–142. ISBN 978-0-8444-1187-3.
- Gaunt, David (2020). "The Long Assyrian Genocide". Collective and State Violence in Turkey: The Construction of a National Identity from Empire to Nation-State. Berghahn Books. pp. 56–96. ISBN 978-1-78920-451-3.
- Polatel, Mehmet (2019). "The State, Local Actors and Mass Violence in Bitlis Province". The End of the Ottomans: The Genocide of 1915 and the Politics of Turkish Nationalism. Bloomsbury Academic. pp. 119–140. ISBN 978-1-78831-241-7.
- Biner, Zerrin Özlem (2011). "Multiple imaginations of the state: understanding a mobile conflict about justice and accountability from the perspective of Assyrian–Syriac communities". Citizenship Studies. 15 (3–4): 367–379. doi:10.1080/13621025.2011.564789. S2CID 144086552.
- Biner, Zerrin Özlem (2019). States of Dispossession: Violence and Precarious Coexistence in Southeast Turkey. University of Pennsylvania Press. ISBN 978-0-8122-9659-4.
- Gaunt, David (2015). "The Complexity of the Assyrian Genocide". Genocide Studies International. 9 (1): 83–103. doi:10.3138/gsi.9.1.05. ISSN 2291-1847.
- Üngör, Uğur Ümit (2011). The Making of Modern Turkey: Nation and State in Eastern Anatolia, 1913–1950. Oxford University Press. ISBN 978-0-19-965522-9.
- "The Eastern Catholic Churches 2016. Source: Annuario Pontificio" (PDF). CNEWA. 2016. pp. 3–4. Archived from the original (PDF) on 2016-10-20.
