= Assyrians in Germany =

ܣܘܪ̈ܝܐ ܕܐܠܡܢ

Total population
- over 130,000

Regions with significant populations
- North Rhine-Westphalia, Hesse, Bavaria, Baden-Württemberg

Languages
- German · Sureth · Surayt

Religion
- Mainly Christianity (majority: Syriac Christianity; minority: Protestantism)

Assyrians in Germany (German: Assyrer in Deutschland; Syriac: ܣܘܪ̈ܝܐ ܕܐܠܡܢ), also known as German Assyrians (German: Deutsch Assyrer), are Germans of Assyrian descent or Assyrians who have German citizenship. The Assyrians in Germany mainly came from Turkey, Iraq, Iran and Syria.

The immigrant community of people of Assyrian descent in Germany is estimated at over 130,000 people. They are known in German either as Assyrer ("Assyrians") or as Aramäer ("Arameans").

== History ==
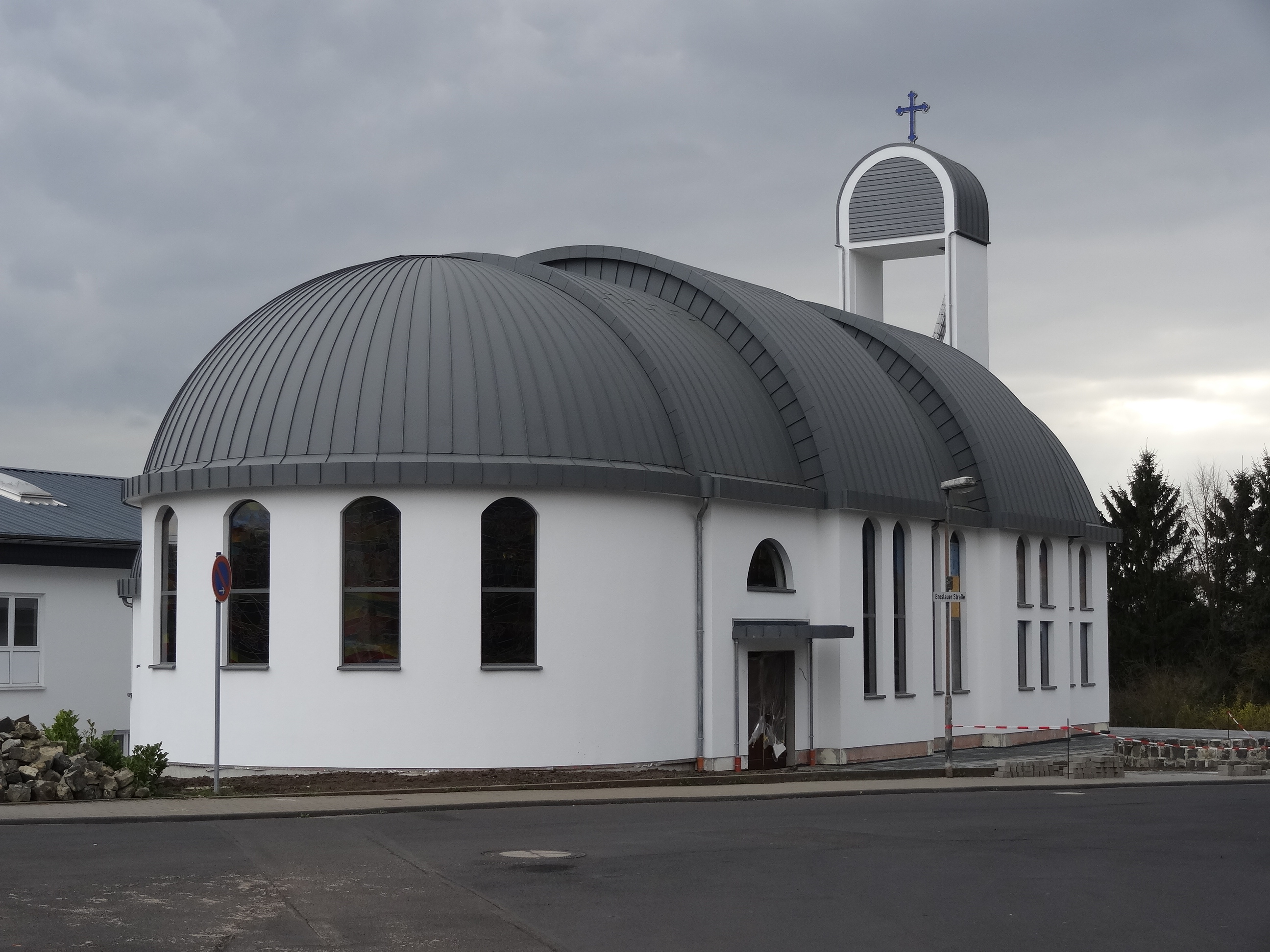
Mor Had Bschabo Church in Pohlheim

Being oppressed and persecuted throughout the 20th century for their religion, many arrived from Turkey only seeking a life. The first wave arrived in the 1960s and 1970s as part of the German economic plan of "Gastarbeiter". As Germany was seeking immigrant workers (largely from Turkey), many Assyrians saw an opportunity for freedom and success and applied for visas along with Turks. Assyrians started working in restaurants or as construction workers for companies and many began running their own shops. The first Assyrian immigrants in Germany started organizing themselves by forming culture clubs and building churches. The second wave came almost immediately after the first, as a result of two events.

The first event was when the Assyrian mayor of Dargeçit was assassinated in 1979 in what has been looked at as a takeover of the local government by Kurds of the Assyrian homeland in Turkey. The new mayor was a Kurd, and that caused the local government to allow huge influxes of Kurds to start squatting on land and driving people off their land. The second event was when the Kurdish–Turkish conflict began in 1984. The area was effectively turned into a sectarian warzone between Turkey and the PKK with Assyrians caught in the middle. Nearly all Assyrians ended up fleeing the area, seeing as how both the Turks and Kurds were hostile, and they would be defenseless now that the local government is out of their hands. They continued to trickle out all the way until the late 90s when the conflict died down, by that time only around 1,000–2,000 people out of 70,000 prior to the conflict remained. Since the early 2000s some reverse migration back to Turkey has occurred now that the conflict is over, with now around 3,000 in the region.

== See also ==
- Swedish Assyrians
- Assyrian diaspora
- Assyrians in Turkey
