= Zeytinliköy, Gökçeada =

Zeytinliköy Άγιοι Θεόδωροι
- Village
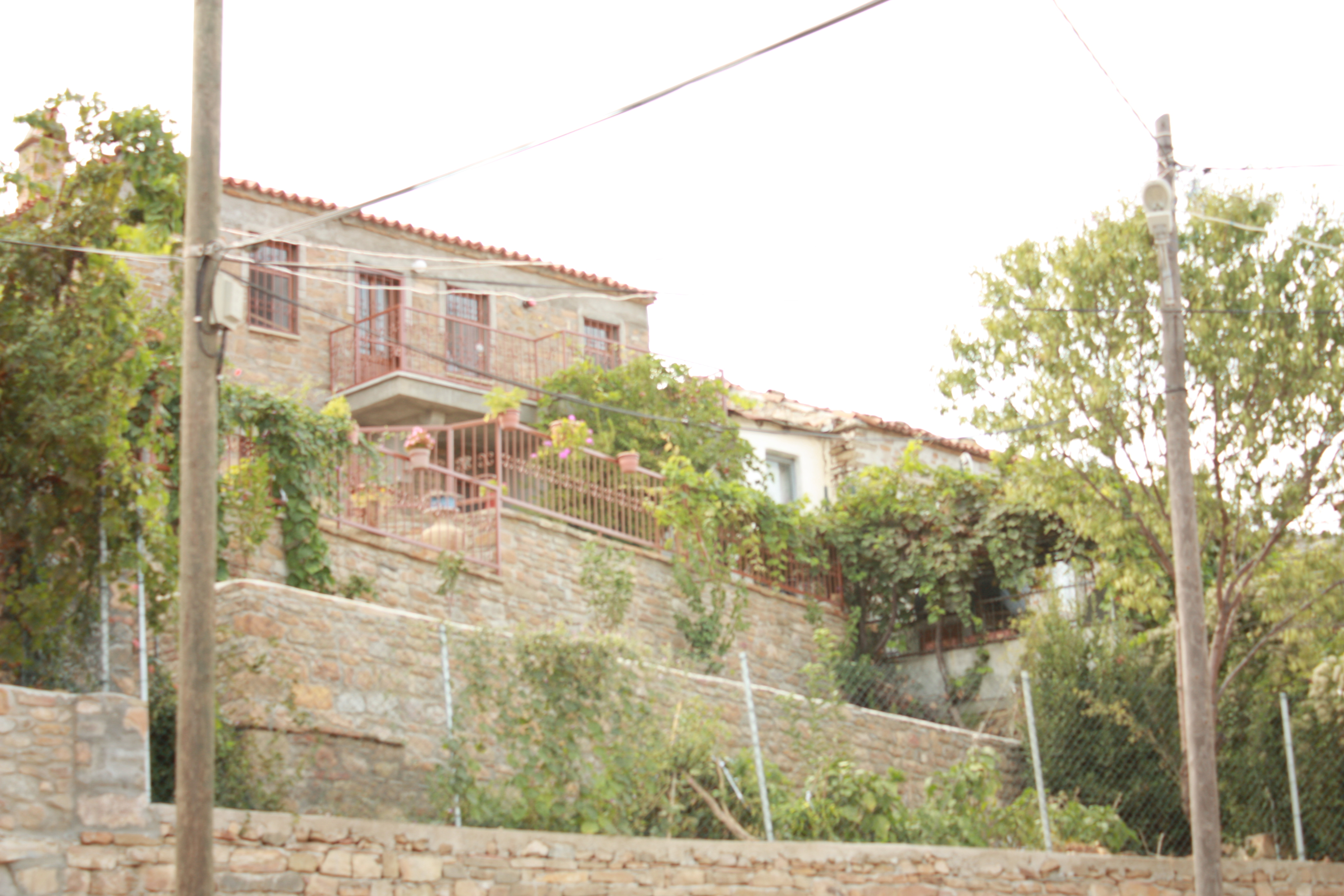
- Traditional houses of the village
- Interactive map of Zeytinliköy
- Location within Turkey Location within Marmara
- Coordinates: 40°11′N 25°52′E
- Country: Turkey
- Province: Çanakkale
- District: Gökçeada

Government
  - Village head: Efstratios Zunis
- Elevation: 100 m (330 ft)
- Population (2022): 179
- Time zone: UTC+3 (TRT)
- Postal code: 17762
- Area code: 0286

Zeytinliköy, also known by its former Greek name Agioi Theodoroi (Greek: Άγιοι Θεόδωροι), is a village on the island of Imbros in northwestern Turkey. It is part of the Gökçeada District of Çanakkale Province. Its population is 179 (2022).

== Geography ==
It is located three kilometres west of the only town of the island, Gökçeada (historically "Panagia" in Greek), and ten kilometres west from the central port of the island. It stands at an altitude of approximately 100 metres, nearby Kastri hill.

== History and demographics ==
The village is one of the oldest settlements of the island of Imbros that is still inhabited. There are three Greek Orthodox Churches in the village. The village had a total population of 179 in 2022, a notable increase since 2007, when it only had 86 inhabitants. It is one of the few predominantly Greek Orthodox settlements in Turkey, with the Greek population ranging at around 80%, and has a Greek mayor, Efstratios Zounis. A Greek minority primary school and kindergarten are operating in the village.

Historical population
Year	Pop.	±% p.a.
2007	86	—
2012	112	+5.43%
2017	133	+3.50%
2022	179	+6.12%
Source: TÜIK (2007–2022)

== Notable people ==
- Apostolos Christodoulou (1856–1917), Greek theologist and priest
- Bartholomew I of Constantinople (born 1940), Ecumenical Patriarch of Constantinople
- Archbishop Iakovos of America (1911–2005), primate of the Greek Orthodox Archdiocese of North and South America from 1959 to 1996
- Spyros Meletzis (1906–2003), Greek photographer
