= Tepeköy, Gökçeada =

Tepeköy Αγρίδια
- Village
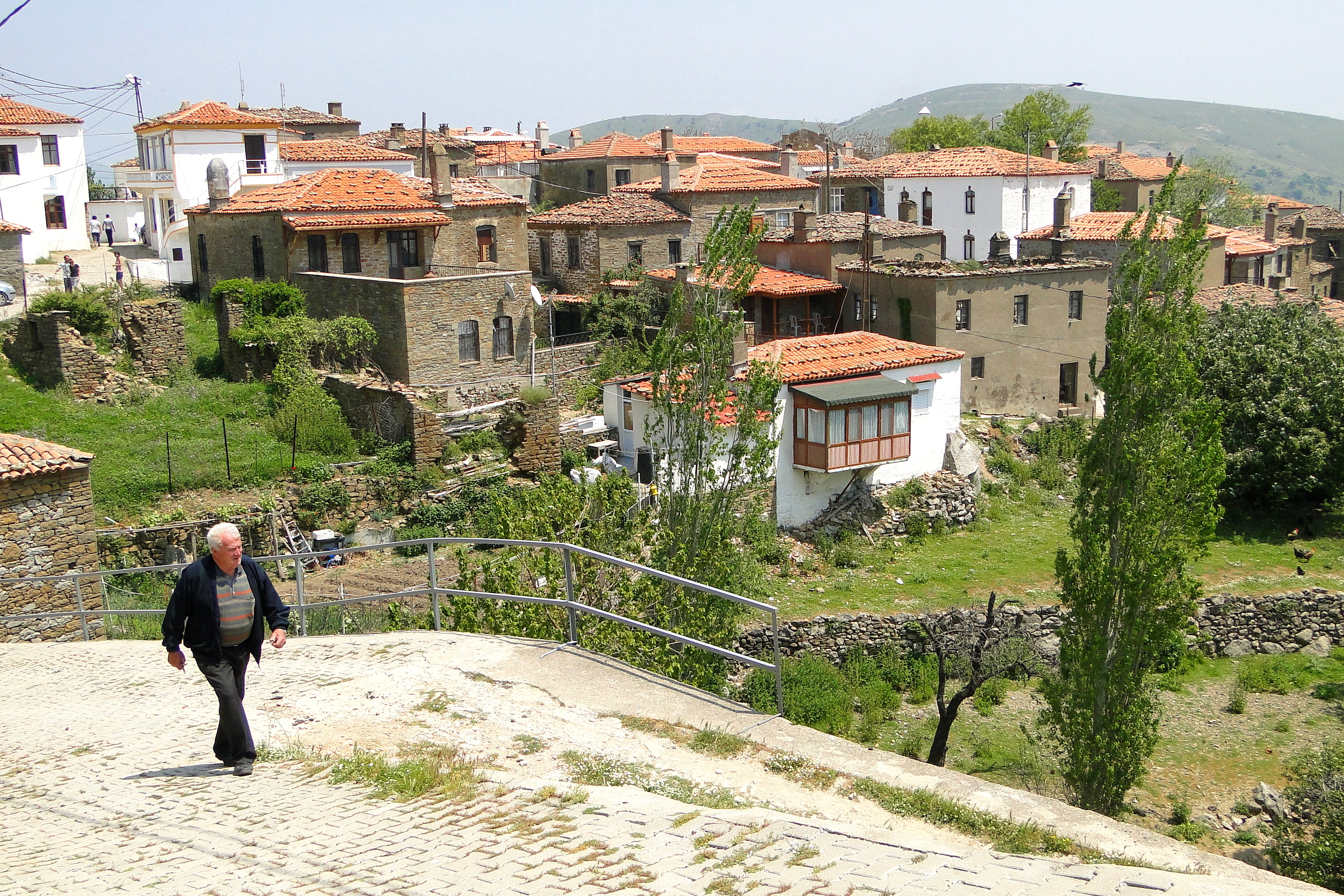
- Traditional houses of the village
- Interactive map of Tepeköy
- Location within Turkey Location within Marmara
- Coordinates: 40°11′25″N 25°50′08″E
- Country: Turkey
- Province: Çanakkale
- District: Gökçeada

Government
  - Village head: Dimitrios Psaros
- Elevation: 280 m (920 ft)
- Population (2022): 177
- Time zone: UTC+3 (TRT)
- Postal code: 17762
- Area code: 0286

Tepeköy, also known by its former Greek name Agrídia (Greek: Αγρίδια), is a village on the island of Imbros in northwestern Turkey. It is part of the Gökçeada District of Çanakkale Province. Its population is 177 (2022).

== Geography ==
It is located 8 km west of the only town of the island, Çınarlı (or in Greek Panagia Balomeni), and 14 km west from the central port of the island. It stands at an altitude of approximately 280m nearby Kastri hill.

== History & Demography ==
The village had a total population of 177 in 2022, a notable increase since 2007, when it only had 125 inhabitants. It is one of the few predominantly Greek Orthodox settlements in Turkey, with the Greek population ranging at around 75%, and has a Greek mayor, Dimitrios Psaros. A Greek Orthodox Church dedicated to the Annunciation lies within the village. A Greek minority high school and junior high school are operating in the village since 2015.

Historical population
| Year | Pop. | ±% p.a. |
|---|---|---|
| 2007 | 125 | — |
| 2012 | 121 | −0.65% |
| 2017 | 145 | +3.69% |
| 2022 | 177 | +4.07% |
Source: TÜIK (2007-2022)
