= Gökçeada Airport =

Airport in Gökçeada, Turkey

Gökçeada Airport Gökçeada Havalimanı
- IATA: GKD; ICAO: LTFK

Summary
- Airport type: Public
- Operator: General Directorate of State Airports Authority
- Serves: Çanakkale, Turkey
- Location: Gökçeada, Çanakkale, Turkey
- Opened: 15 August 2010; 15 years ago
- Elevation AMSL: 222 m / 73 ft
- Coordinates: 40°12′04″N 25°52′56″E
- Website: www.dhmi.gov.tr

Map
- Location of airport in Turkey GKD (Europe)

Runways
Direction	Length		Surface
Direction	m	ft	Surface
01/19	2,040	6,692	Concrete

Gökçeada Airport (IATA: GKD, ICAO: LTFK) (Turkish: Gökçeada Havalimanı) is a public airport in Gökçeada, a town in Çanakkale Province, Turkey. Opened to public/civil air traffic in 2010, the airport is 6 km (3.7 mi) away from Gökçeada town centre.

== Traffic Statistics ==
Gökçeada Airport passenger traffic statistics
Year (months)	Domestic	% change	International	% change	Total	% change
2013	1,726	▲4%	-	-	1,726	▲4%
2012	1,666	▲51%	-	-	1,666	▲51%
2011	1,106	Steady	-	Steady	1,106	Steady
