= Apostolos Christodoulou =

Greek priest, theologist

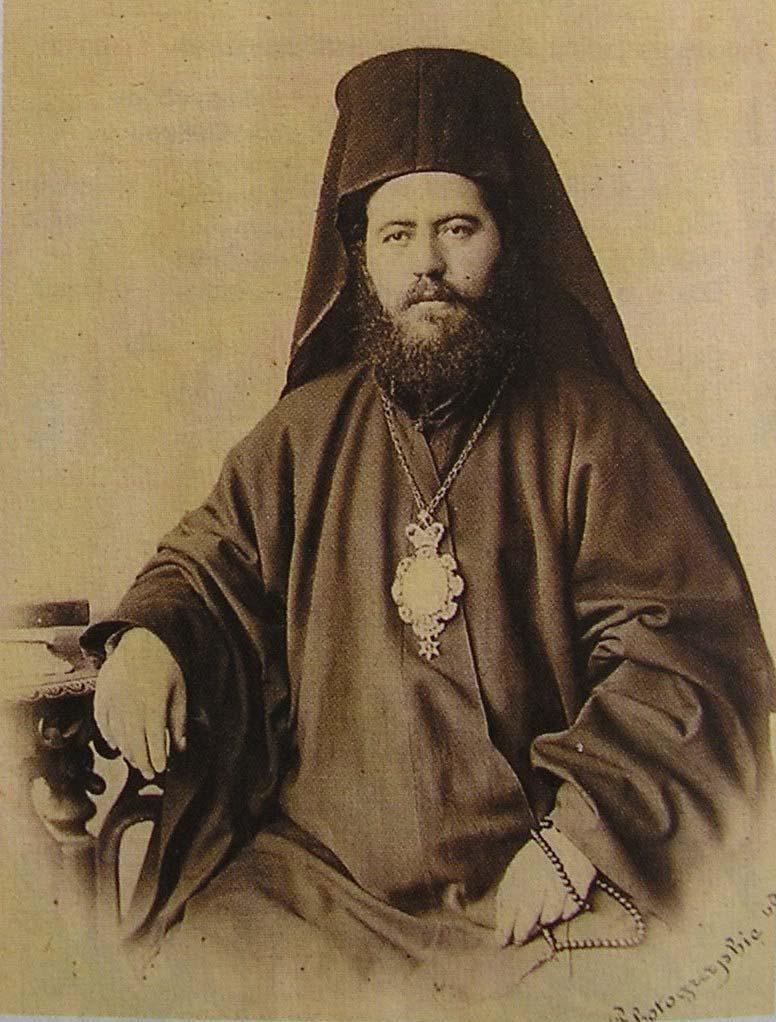
Apostos Christodoulou in the early 20th century

Apostolos Christodoulou (Greek: Απόστολος Χριστοδούλου) was a Greek priest, theologist and Metropolitan bishop of the Ecumenical Patriarchate of Constantinople.

== Biography ==
Christodoulou was born in 1856 in Agios Theodoros of Imbros, then Ottoman Empire (now Turkey). He completed his studies in his homeland and later studied in the Theological School of Halki for the period of 1874-1881. Then, for 1 year, he taught theology in the Zappeio Girls' school of Constantinople. In 1882 he studied in the Kiev Theological Academy and after some years of his successful graduation, he taught theology in the Theological School of Halki, and became the schoolmaster of it in 1899. From 1899-1904, he worked on a committee assigned by the Patriarch of Constantinople to create a Byzantine text-type New Testament, later published as The New Testament, Approved by the Great Church of Christ in 1904. He served as a Metropolitan bishop of Stavropol from 1901 and later in Veria from 1906 to 1909. Since 1909 he became the Metropolitan bishop of Serres and at the same time helping people suffering from Cholera.

During the First World War in 1917, when Serres was temporarily occupied by the Central Powers, Metropolitan Apostolos was not permitted to get out of his cathedral after an order by the Bulgarian commander. He died there on 14 January 1917 at the age of 60 or 61 under unknown circumstances.
