= İnce Burun, Gökçeada =

Island in Turkey

Coordinates: 40°09′39″N 25°50′40″E

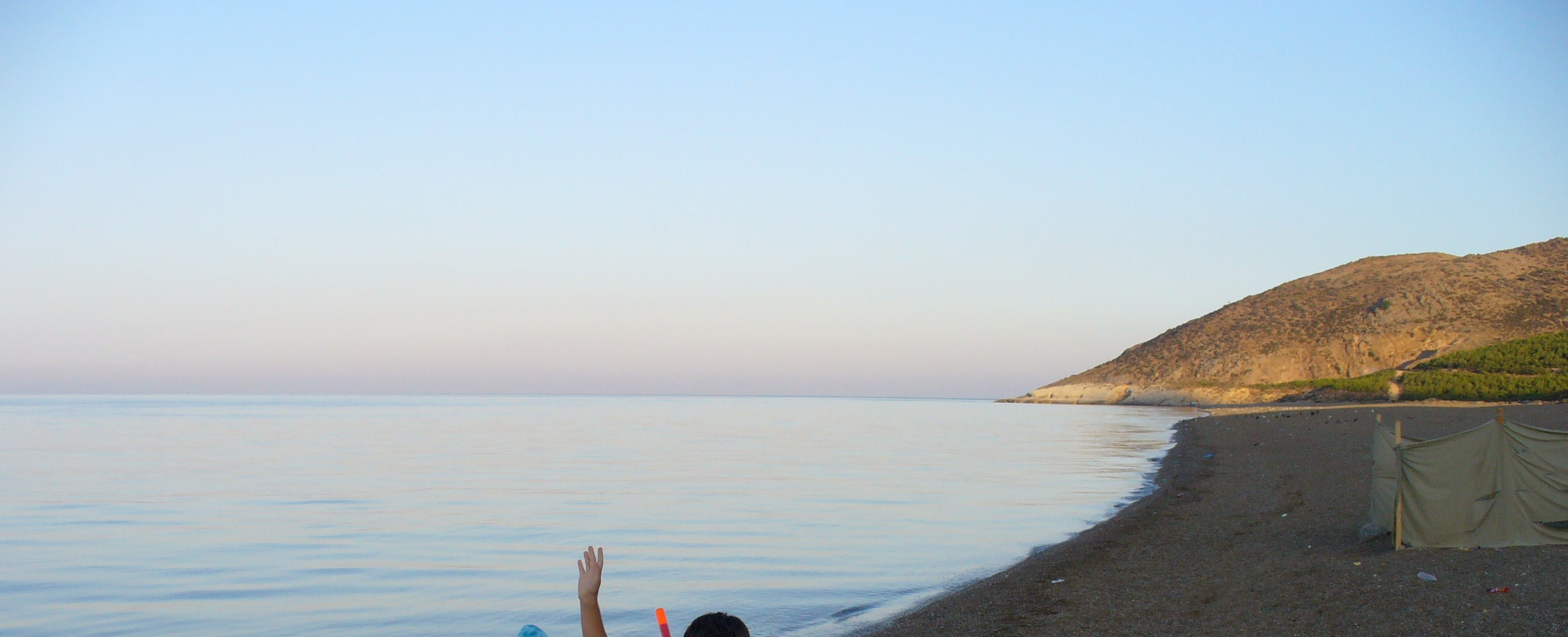
İnce Burun seen from Gizli Liman

İnce Burun, also Avlaka Burnu, is the westernmost point of Turkey. It is located at Gökçeada (older name in Turkish: İmroz; Greek: Ίμβρος – Imvros), at the entrance of Gulf of Saros in the northern Aegean Sea.

== See also ==
- Imbros

== Weblink ==
- The Most Extreme Points Of Turkey WorldAtlas.com
