= Uğurlu, Gökçeada =

Village in Turkey

Uğurlu
- Village
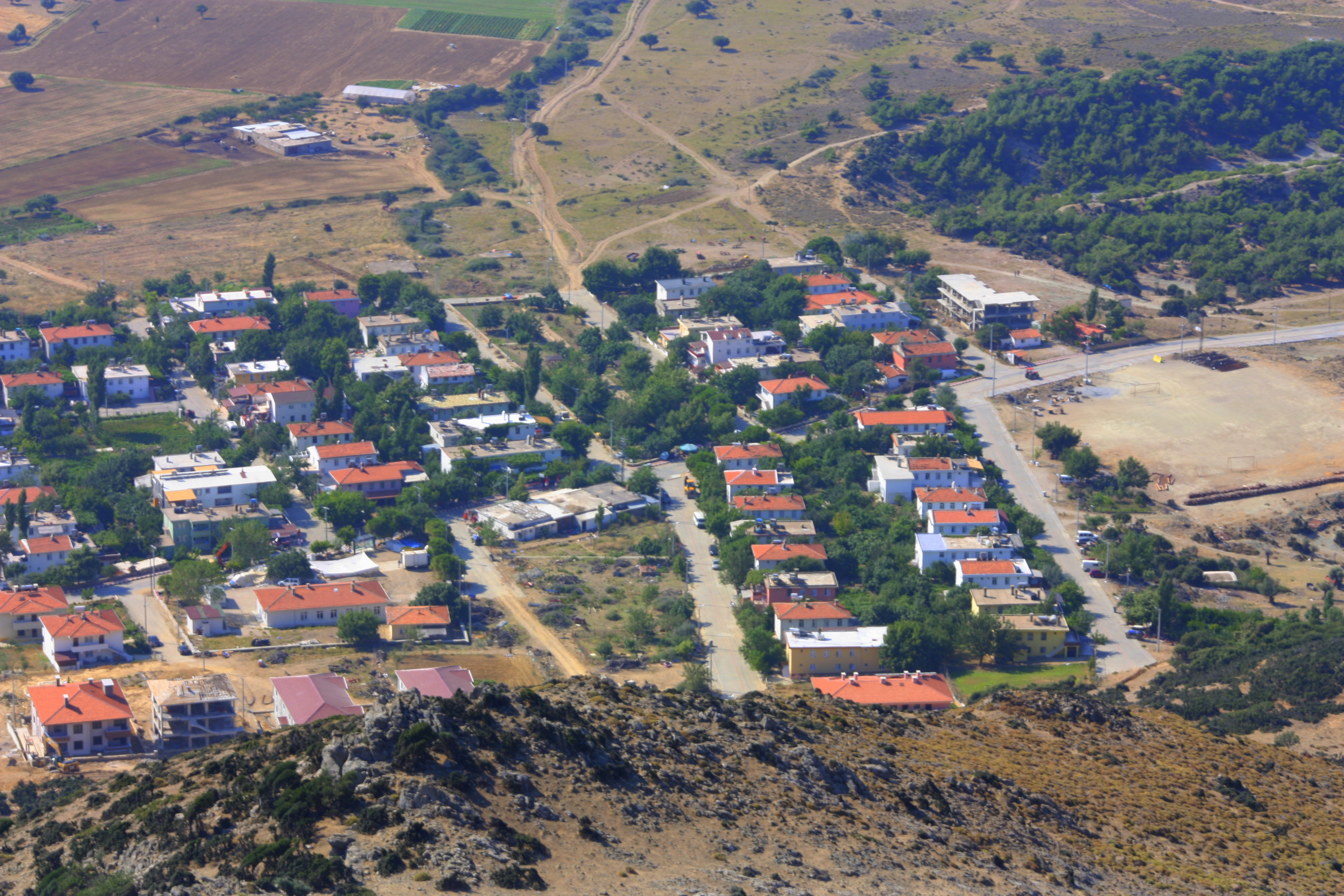
- Interactive map of Uğurlu
- Location within Turkey Location within Marmara
- Coordinates: 40°7′24.60″N 25°42′20.52″E
- Country: Turkey
- Province: Çanakkale
- District: Gökçeada
- Population (2021): 549
- Time zone: UTC+3 (TRT)

Uğurlu is a village in the Gökçeada District of Çanakkale Province in Turkey. Its population is 549 (2021).
