= Dereköy, Gökçeada =

Village in Turkey

Dereköy Σχοινούδι
- Village
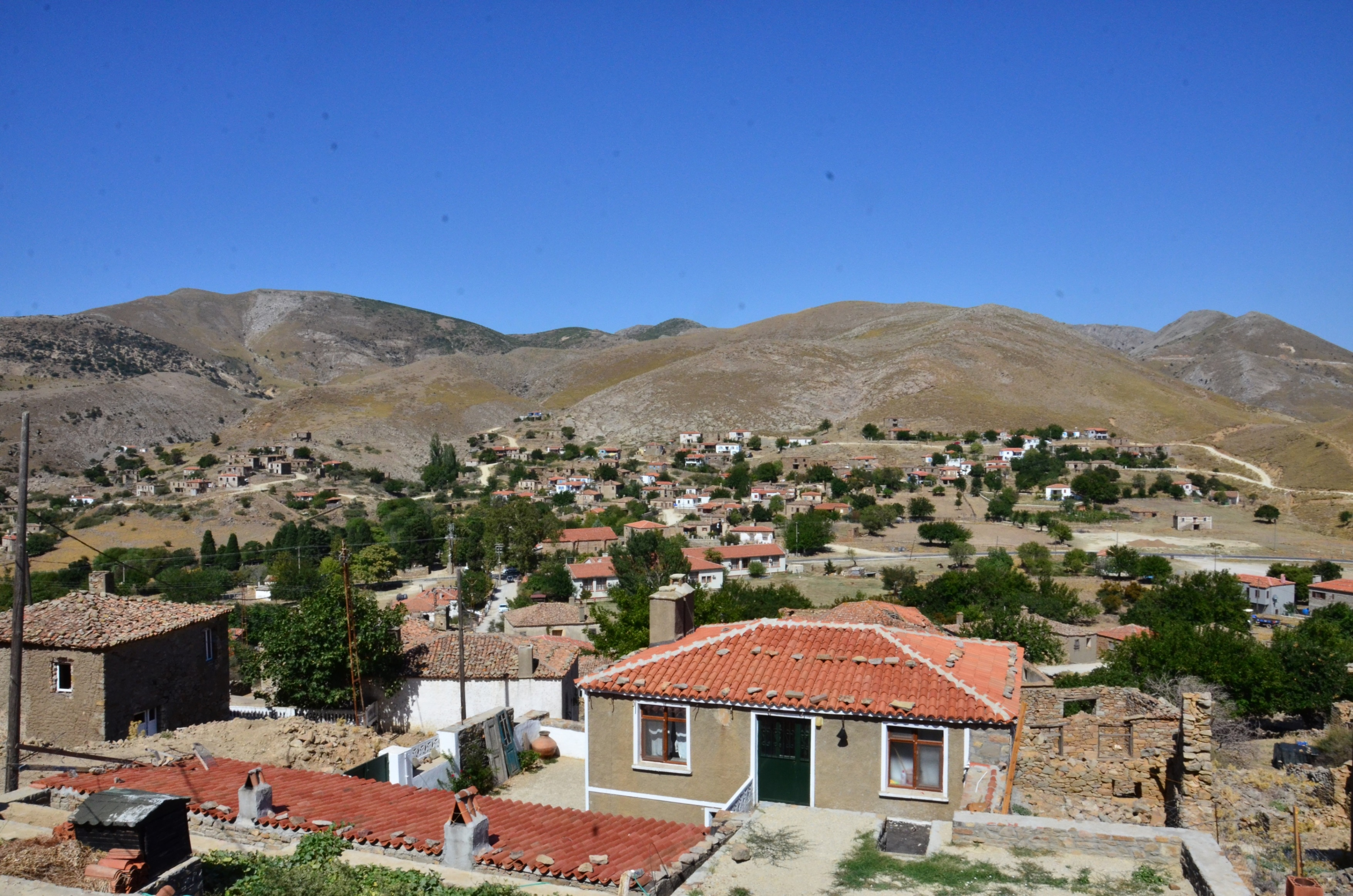
- Interactive map of Dereköy
- Location within Turkey Location within Marmara
- Coordinates: 40.151378°N 25.770987°E
- Country: Turkey
- Province: Çanakkale
- District: Gökçeada
- Population (2021): 361
- Time zone: UTC+3 (TRT)

Dereköy, originally İskinit (Greek: Σχοινούδι), is a village in the Gökçeada District of Çanakkale Province in Turkey. The village had a population of 361 in 2022.
