= Eşelek, Gökçeada =

Village in Turkey

Eşelek
- Village
- Interactive map of Eşelek
- Location in Turkey Eşelek (Marmara)
- Coordinates: 40.148201°N 25.944661°E
- Country: Turkey
- Province: Çanakkale
- District: Gökçeada
- Population (2021): 176
- Time zone: UTC+3 (TRT)

Eşelek is a village in the Gökçeada District of Çanakkale Province in Turkey. Its population is 176 (2021).
