= Patriarchal text =

New Testament edition

- Abbreviation: PT
- Language: Koine Greek
- NT published: 1904
- Textual basis: Byzantine
- Version revision: 1907, 1912
- Publisher: Ecumenical Patriarchate of Constantinople
- Religious affiliation: Eastern Orthodox Church
- Website: www.goarch.org/chapel/greek-new-testament
- John 3:16 "οὕτω γὰρ ἠγάπησεν ὁ Θεὸς τὸν κόσμον, ὥστε τὸν υἱὸν αὐτοῦ τὸν μονογενῆ ἔδωκεν, ἵνα πᾶς ὁ πιστεύων εἰς αὐτὸν μὴ ἀπόληται, ἀλλ᾽ ἔχῃ ζωὴν αἰώνιον.

The Patriarchal text, or Patriarchal Text (PT), originally officially published as The New Testament, Approved by the Great Church of Christ (Greek: Ἡ Καινὴ Διαθήκη ἐγκρίσει τῆς Μεγάλης τοῦ Χριστοῦ Ἐκκλησίας), is an edition of the New Testament published by the Ecumenical Patriarchate of Constantinople on 22 February 1904. Two revised editions of the PT were later printed by the Ecumenical Patriarchate, in respectively 1907 and 1912.

The PT is also known as the Antoniades-text (after Professor Vasileios Antoniades), or Patriarchal Greek New Testament.

The PT is entirely in Koine Greek. There is no Greek New Testament text accepted by everyone within the Eastern Orthodox Church, the Patriarchal text is no exception. The text-type of the PT is Byzantine.

== History ==
With the growth of textual criticism in the 18th and 19th century, and particularly the rival eclectic text-type, the Patriarch Constantine V of Constantinople created a committee in 1899 to examine the manuscript tradition of the Eastern Orthodox Church. The committee consisted of Metropolitan Michael Kleovoulos of Sardis, Metropolitan Apostolos Christodoulou of Stavroupoli and Professor Vasileios Antoniades of the Theological School of Halki, who personally studied the 45 texts from Mount Athos and Constantinople. The commission aimed for the creation of a standardized New Testament in the Greek language to reconstruct the ancient documents from the Church's ecclesiastical history.

The Patriarchal text was published in 1904. Later revised editions were made in 1907 and 1912, the latter made by Professor Vasileios Antoniades of the Theological School of Halki.

Today the Patriarchal text is commonly used in Greece, with a modified text fixing errors from the 1912 version, is published by the Apostoliki Diakonia, which is the official publishing house of the Church of Greece. Other publishers publish the Patriarchal text as well.

== Textual characteristics ==
The text-type of the PT is Byzantine and uses 116 documents used in the Eastern Orthodox Church lectionaries, 45 of which are from Mount Athos and Constantinople, with the rest coming from Athens and Jerusalem. The source texts used date from 9-16th centuries, with a majority coming from the 10-14th centuries.

The Patriarchal edition of Byzantine text (1904) published in 2020 by the Hellenic Bible Society (Ελληνική Βιβλική Εταιρία) includes the Johannine Comma (1 John 5.7-8), but it is also disputed because the publisher combines the sources to create a slightly different version from the Byzantine Text 1904.

== Translations into English ==
The Patriarchal text has been translated into English and used by certain Eastern Orthodox Bibles in that language. The Eastern / Greek Orthodox Bible uses the Patriarchal text as the basis of its New Testament translation.

== See also ==
- Gospel riots
