= Yenibademli, Gökçeada =

Village in Turkey

Yenibademli
- Village
- Interactive map of Yenibademli
- Location in Turkey Yenibademli (Marmara)
- Coordinates: 40.227993°N 25.900825°E
- Country: Turkey
- Province: Çanakkale
- District: Gökçeada
- Population (2021): 913
- Time zone: UTC+3 (TRT)

Yenibademli is a village in the Gökçeada District of Çanakkale Province in Turkey. Its population was 913 in 2021.
