= Bademli, Gökçeada =

Village in Turkey

Bademli Γλυκύ
- Village
- Interactive map of Bademli
- Location in Turkey Bademli (Marmara)
- Coordinates: 40.2215°N 25.9078°E
- Country: Turkey
- Province: Çanakkale
- District: Gökçeada
- Population (2021): 70
- Time zone: UTC+3 (TRT)

Bademli (Greek: Γλυκύ) is a village in the Gökçeada District of Çanakkale Province in Turkey. Its population is 70 (2021).
