= Kaleköy, Gökçeada =

Village in Turkey

Kaleköy
- Village
- Interactive map of Kaleköy
- Location in Turkey Kaleköy (Marmara)
- Coordinates: 40.233547°N 25.898582°E
- Country: Turkey
- Province: Çanakkale
- District: Gökçeada
- Population (2021): 128
- Time zone: UTC+3 (TRT)

Kaleköy is a village in the Gökçeada District of Çanakkale Province in Turkey. Its population is 128 (2021).
