= Şirinköy, Gökçeada =

Village in Turkey

Şirinköy
- Village
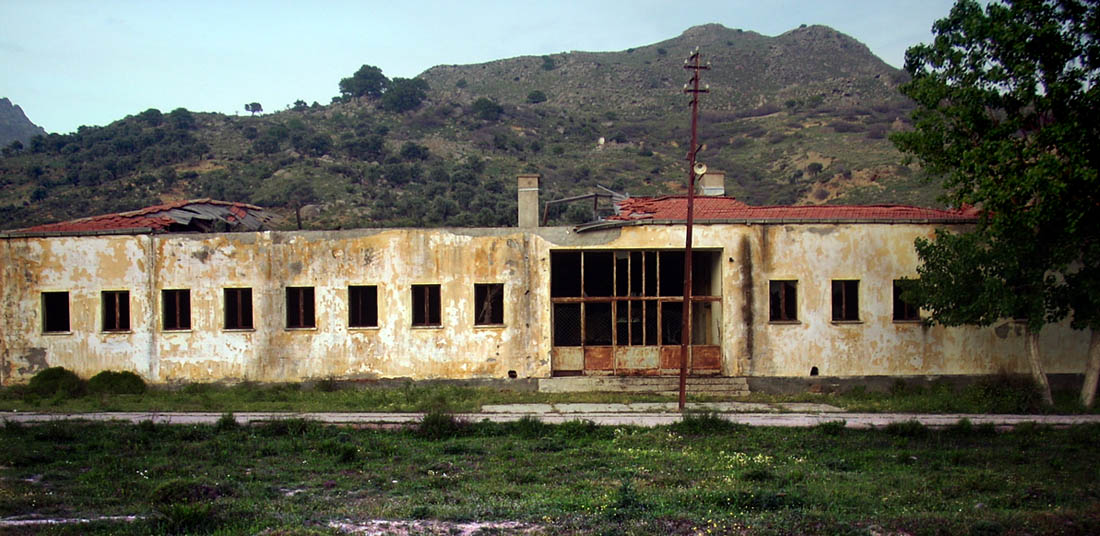
- Interactive map of Şirinköy
- Location within Turkey Location within Marmara
- Coordinates: 40.127388°N 25.742627°E
- Country: Turkey
- Province: Çanakkale
- District: Gökçeada
- Population (2021): 264
- Time zone: UTC+3 (TRT)

Şirinköy is a village in the Gökçeada District of Çanakkale Province in Turkey. Its population is 264 (2021).
