= Gökçeada District =

- District
- Map showing Gökçeada District in Çanakkale Province

- Location in Turkey Gökçeada District (Marmara)
- Coordinates: 40°10′N 25°51′E
- Country: Turkey
- Province: Çanakkale
- Seat: Gökçeada

Government
  - Kaymakam: Serhat Doğan
- Area: 282 km^{2} (109 sq mi)
- Population (2021): 10,377
  - Density: 37/km^{2} (95/sq mi)
- Time zone: UTC+3 (TRT)
- Postal code: 17760
- Website: www.gokceada.gov.tr

Gökçeada District is a district of the Çanakkale Province of Turkey. Its seat is the town of Gökçeada. Its area is 282 km^{2} (109 sq mi), and its population is 10,377 (2021).

The district consists of the island of Imbros (Turkish: Gökçeada), the largest island in Turkey. The mayor of Gökçeada municipality is Ünal Çetin (İYİ). The district governor (kaymakam) is Serhat Doğan.

== Composition ==
There is one municipality in Gökçeada District:

- Gökçeada

There are 9 villages in Gökçeada District:

- Bademli
- Dereköy
- Eşelek
- Kaleköy
- Şirinköy
- Tepeköy
- Uğurlu
- Yenibademli
- Zeytinliköy

== Gallery ==
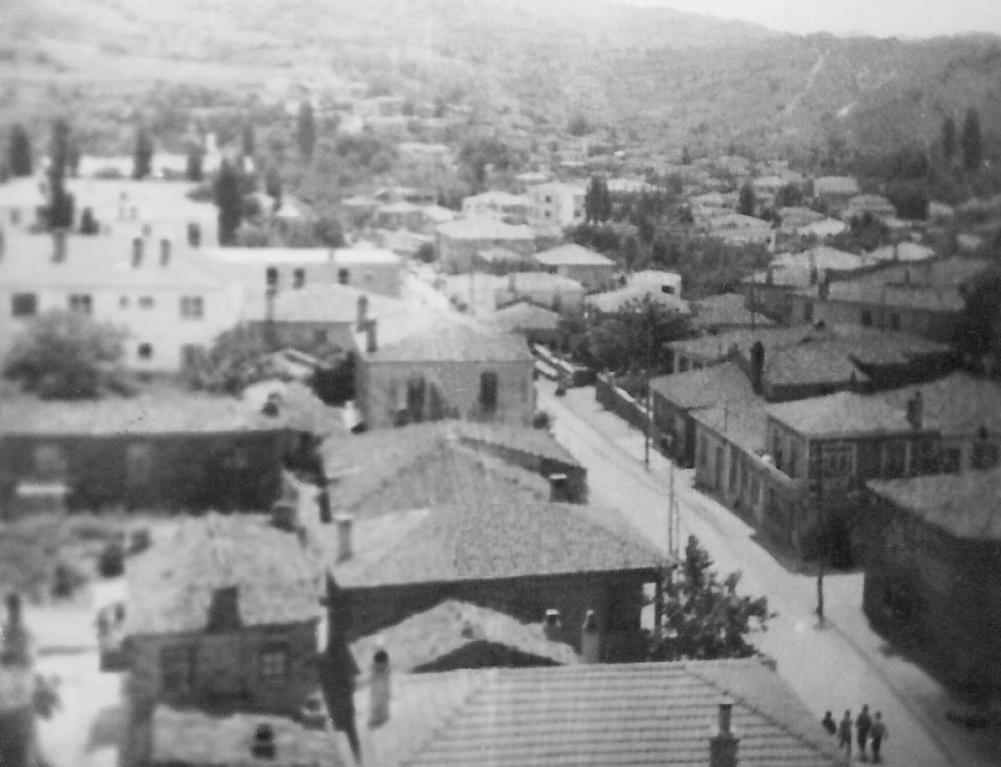
Gökçeada 1967

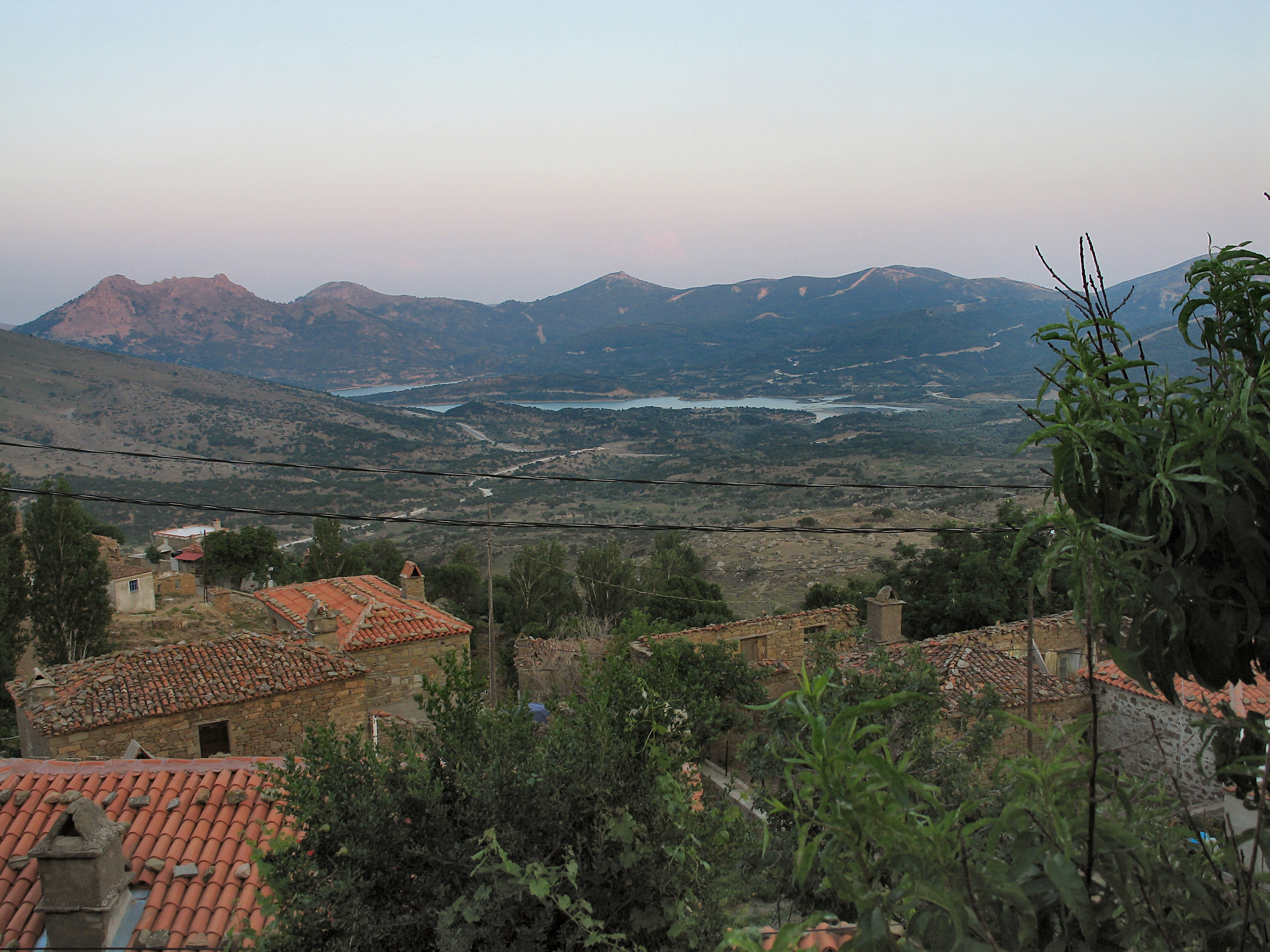
Zeytinli

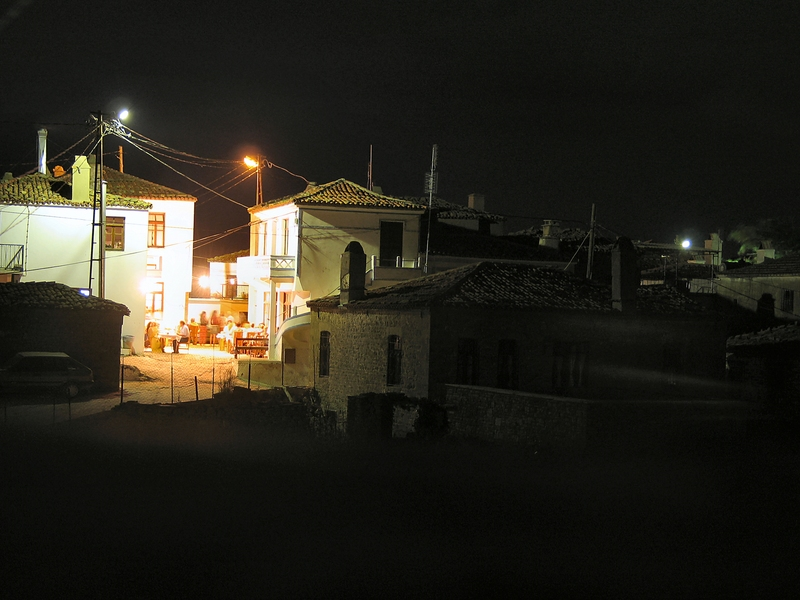
Zeytinli

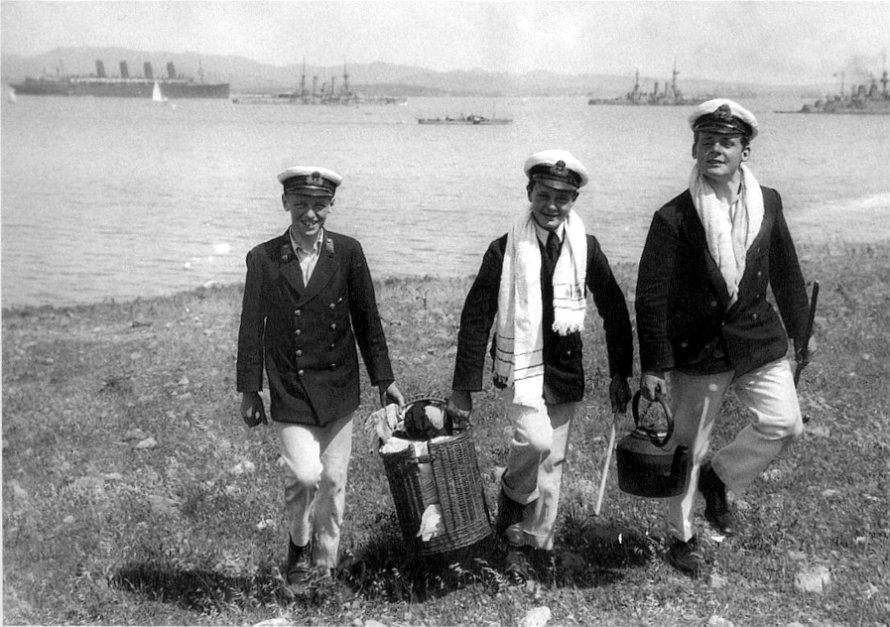
Three Royal Navy midshipmen, George Drewry, Wilfred Malleson and Greg Russell, having a picnic on Imbros during the Battle of Gallipoli

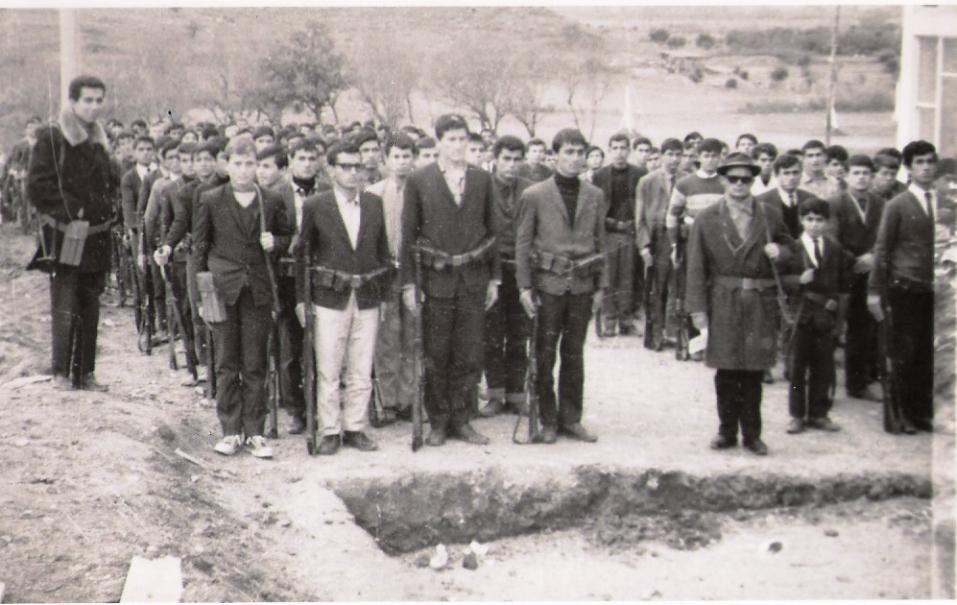
Students of "İmroz İlköğretmen Okulu/Imbros Education High School" in military training class, 3 December 1967
