= Gökçeada (town) =

Town in Çanakkale Province, Turkey

- Municipality
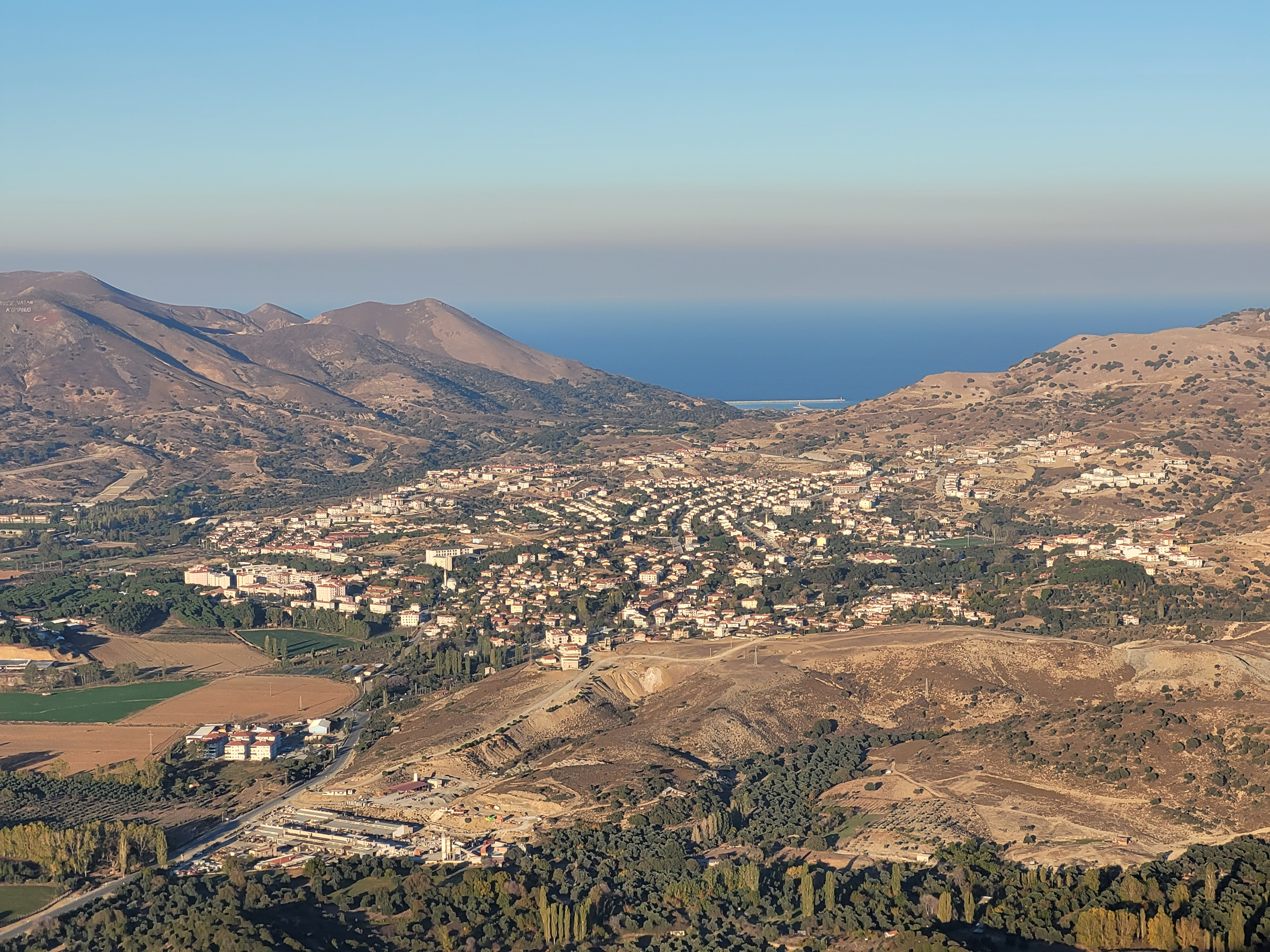
- The view of the town from Araşa Mountain, located to the southwest

- Location within Turkey Location within Marmara
- Coordinates: 40°11′38″N 25°54′17″E
- Country: Turkey
- Province: Çanakkale
- District: Gökçeada
- Population (2022): 7,479
- Time zone: UTC+3 (TRT)

Gökçeada, formerly known as Çınarlı and historically Panagia, is a town and the administrative seat of the Gökçeada District, Çanakkale Province, Turkey. The town had a population of 7,479 in 2022. It is located on the northeastern side of the island of Imbros.

== Climate ==
Gökçeada has a hot-summer Mediterranean climate (Köppen: Csa), with hot, dry summers, and cool, rainy winters.

Climate data for Gökçeada (1991–2020)
Month	Jan	Feb	Mar	Apr	May	Jun	Jul	Aug	Sep	Oct	Nov	Dec	Year
Mean daily maximum °C (°F)	9.8 (49.6)	10.7 (51.3)	13.3 (55.9)	17.8 (64.0)	23.2 (73.8)	28.1 (82.6)	30.6 (87.1)	30.7 (87.3)	26.1 (79.0)	20.4 (68.7)	15.6 (60.1)	11.3 (52.3)	19.8 (67.6)
Daily mean °C (°F)	7.0 (44.6)	7.4 (45.3)	9.6 (49.3)	13.5 (56.3)	18.3 (64.9)	22.9 (73.2)	25.3 (77.5)	25.4 (77.7)	21.4 (70.5)	16.7 (62.1)	12.5 (54.5)	8.6 (47.5)	15.7 (60.3)
Mean daily minimum °C (°F)	4.4 (39.9)	4.7 (40.5)	6.6 (43.9)	9.9 (49.8)	14.2 (57.6)	18.4 (65.1)	20.8 (69.4)	21.2 (70.2)	17.8 (64.0)	13.8 (56.8)	9.9 (49.8)	6.2 (43.2)	12.4 (54.3)
Average precipitation mm (inches)	109.28 (4.30)	88.03 (3.47)	88.02 (3.47)	55.04 (2.17)	36.66 (1.44)	23.45 (0.92)	14.29 (0.56)	8.46 (0.33)	33.33 (1.31)	73.37 (2.89)	99.35 (3.91)	121.88 (4.80)	751.16 (29.57)
Average precipitation days (≥ 1.0 mm)	7.2	7.3	6.8	5.8	4.2	2.5	2.2	1.8	3.3	4.9	6.6	9.6	62.2
Average relative humidity (%)	79.4	77.2	74.2	68.9	66.9	62.5	59.9	61.3	65.0	73.4	77.9	79.6	70.5
Source: NOAA
