= Imbros =

Island in Turkey

Gökçeada İmroz
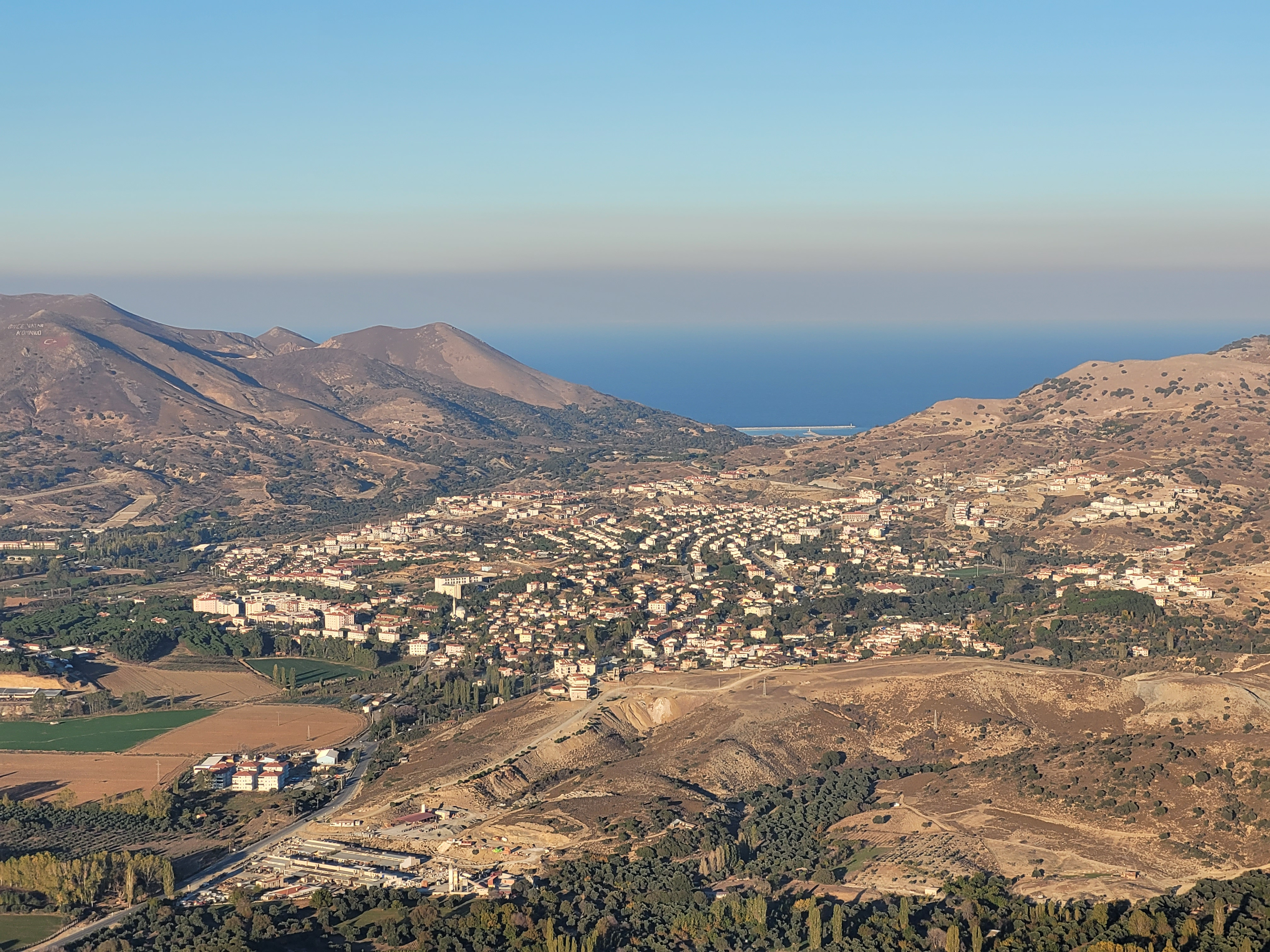
- View of Gökçeada

- Location within Marmara Location within Turkey Location within Europe
- Interactive map of Imbros

Geography
- Location: Aegean Sea
- Coordinates: 40°09′39″N 25°50′40″E
- Area: 286.8 km^{2} (110.7 sq mi)
- Highest elevation: 673 m (2208 ft)
- Highest point: İlyas Dağ (Προφήτης Ηλίας Profitis Ilias)

Administration
- Turkey
- District: Gökçeada District

Demographics
- Population: 10,721 (2023)

Imbros (Greek: Ίμβρος, romanized: Ímvros; Turkish: İmroz; Ottoman Turkish: ايمروز), officially Gökçeada (lit. 'heavenly island') since 29 July 1970, is the largest island of Turkey, located in Çanakkale Province. It is located in the north-northeastern Aegean Sea, at the entrance of Saros Bay, and has the westernmost point of Turkey (Cape İncirburnu). Imbros has an area of 286.8 km^{2} (110.7 sq mi), and has some wooded areas.

As of 2023, the island-district of Gökçeada has a population of 10,721. The main industries of Imbros are fishing and tourism. By the end of the 20th century, the island was predominantly inhabited by settlers from the Turkish mainland that mostly arrived after 1960, with the indigenous Greek population having declined to about 300 persons by the start of the 21st century.

Historically, the island was primarily inhabited by ethnic Greeks since the Iron Age until approximately the 1960s, when many were forced to emigrate to Greece as well as to Western Europe, the United States and Australia, due to a campaign of discrimination and ethnic cleansing sponsored by the governments of İsmet İnönü. The Greek Imbriot diaspora is thought to number around 15,000 globally and in Turkey, and has a strong special Imbrian identity. The 2010s saw a tentative revitalisation of the island's remaining Greek community.

== History ==
=== In mythology ===
According to Greek mythology, the palace of Thetis, mother of Achilles, king of Phthia, was situated between Imbros and Samothrace.

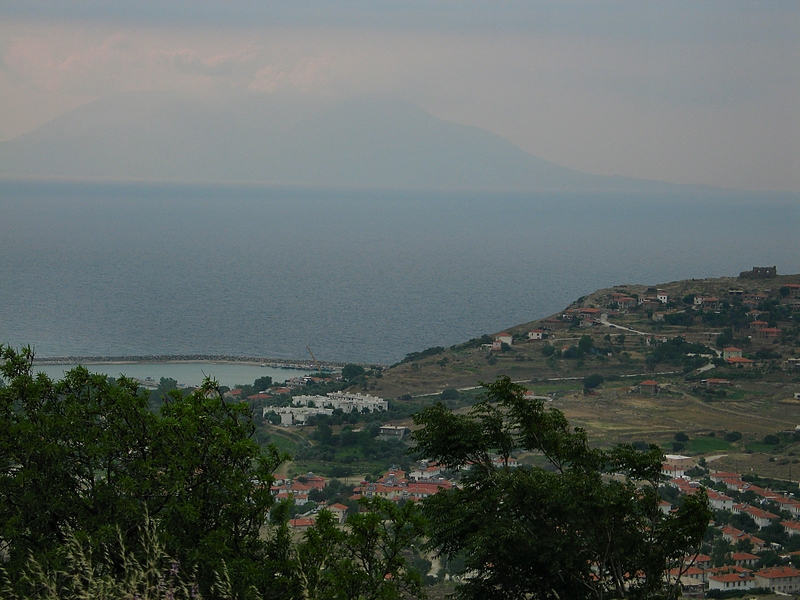
View of Samothrace from Imbros

The stables of the winged horses of Poseidon were said to lie between Imbros and Tenedos.

Homer wrote in the Iliad:

In the depths of the sea on the cliff
Between Tenedos and craggy Imbros
There is a cave, wide gaping
Poseidon who made the earth tremble,
stopped the horses there.

Eëtion, a lord of or ruler over the island of Imbros, is also mentioned in the Iliad. He buys Priam's captured son Lycaon and restores him to his father. Homer also writes that Hera and Hypnos leave Lemnos and Imbros making their way to Mount Ida. Homer mentions Imbros in the Iliad on other occasions as well.

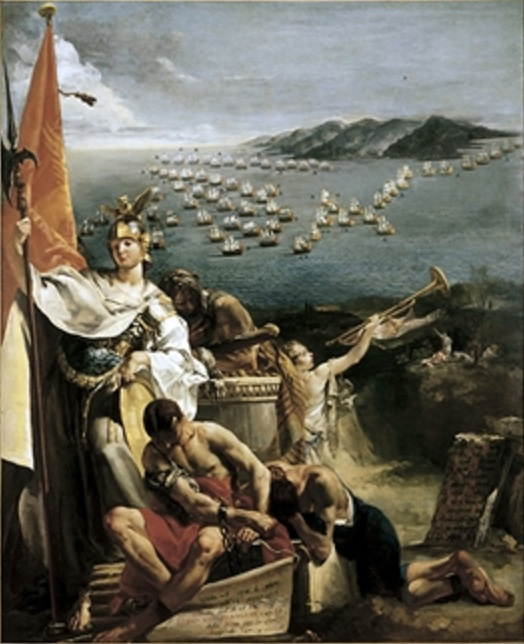
A view of the Battle of Imbros from June 12-16, 1717, between the Venetian Armata Grossa and the Ottoman Armada. During this battle, Admiral Flangini was mortally wounded. A month later, on July 19, the Battle of Matapan took place. circa 1733 and 1741.

Imbros is mentioned in the Homeric Hymn which was dedicated to Apollo.

Apollonius of Rhodes also mentions Imbros in the first book of his work Argonautica.

=== In antiquity ===
The original inhabitants of Imbros were Pelasgians who worshipped the Cabeiri and Hermes as a god of reproduction in ithyphallic form, whence his Carian epithet, 'Ιμβραμος, is assumed to be derived from. For the ancient Greeks, the islands of Lemnos and Imbros were sacred to Hephaestus, god of metallurgy, and an ithyphallic Hephaestus appears on the ancient coins of Imbros. The Imbriots also worshipped an ithyphallic deity called Orthanes, whose cult was adopted by the Athenians when they conquered the island, though he never became as important in Athens as he was in Imbros.

In classical antiquity, Imbros, like Lemnos, was an Athenian cleruchy, a colony whose settlers retained Athenian citizenship; although, since the Imbrians appear on the Athenian tribute lists, there may have been a division with the native population. The original inhabitants of Imbros were Pelasgians, as mentioned by Herodotus in The Histories.

In 511 or 512 BC the island was captured by the Persian general Otanes. Miltiades conquered the island from Persia after the Battle of Salamis; the colony was established about 450 BC, during the first Athenian empire, and was retained by Athens (with brief exceptions) for the next six centuries. Thucydides, in his History of the Peloponnesian War describes the colonization of Imbros, and at several places in his narrative mentions the contribution of Imbrians in support of Athens during various military actions. He also recounts the escape of an Athenian squadron to Imbros. During the Social War (357–355 BC) the Chians, Rhodians and Byzantines attacked Imbros and Lemnos, which were allies of Athens. In the late second century AD, the island may have become independent under Septimius Severus.

Strabo mentions that the Cabeiri were most honored in Imbros and Lemnos.

Stephanus of Byzantium mentions that Imbros was sacred to the Cabeiri and Hermes.

The Imbrian Mysteries were one of the secret religious rites of ancient Greece (similar to the Eleusinian Mysteries), but very little is known about them.

It is said that Philonomus had sent to Amyclae in Laconia colonists from Imbros and Lemnos.

Philostratus in his Letter 70 to the Imbrian Cleophon, states that being a Lemnian, he considers Imbros also as his homeland.

Aeneas Tacticus reports that an Imbrian commander, Athenodorus, during the 4th century BC, was stationed in the vicinity with his forces when Charidemus of Oreos seized Ilium. Upon receiving news of the event, Athenodorus advanced to assist the city. He marched by night, deliberately avoiding roads on which ambushes had been established, and instead proceeded along alternative routes. He arrived at the gates of Ilium, where considerable confusion prevailed as troops were entering the city. Some of his men succeeded in entering undetected alongside the other forces. However, as events unfolded, certain soldiers were identified through the use of watchwords, and some were subsequently expelled or killed at the gates.

=== Byzantine era ===
The Byzantine Empire in the first half of the 15th century. Thessaloniki was captured by the Ottomans in 1430. A few islands in the Aegean and the Propontis remained under Byzantine rule until 1453 (not shown on the map).

The Notitiae Episcopatuum lists the Province of Hellas, also known as Achaia, as being under a proconsul and comprising seventy-nine cities and islands. Among the places named is Imbros.

Prior to the Fall of Constantinople, several larger islands south of Imbros were under Genoese rule, part of the territory historically held in the eastern Mediterranean by the independent Maritime Republic of Genoa (1005–1797, thus predating the East–West schism of 1054) a political development emanating from the former territory of the Western Roman Empire, by city-states such as Venice, Pisa and Amalfi.

At the beginning of the 13th century, when the Fourth Crusade and its aftermath temporarily disrupted Venice's relations with the Byzantine Empire, Genoa expanded its influence north of Imbros, into the Black Sea and Crimea.

Ruy González de Clavijo, ambassador to Henry III of Castile to the court of Timur, travelled through the Aegean during his 1403-1406 Embassy to Samarkand, noted the island as being under the rule of the Byzantines.

=== Ottoman era (1455-1466, 1470-1912) ===
Shortly following the fall of Constantinople in 1453, the Byzantine forces in Imbros left the island, and the population became Ottoman subjects. The island was not conquered by force, but rather through istimalet policy. Michael Critoboulos, a leading Imvrian, and subsequently a chronicler of Mehmet II, organised and facilitated the peaceful surrender of the island to the Ottomans. In return for taxes and loyalty, the island was given a degree of relative autonomy, with administration under a local person. In 1479, the island came under definitive Ottoman rule. The Ottomans, through issuing kanunname and installing local Muslim rulers, attempted to integrate the entirely Orthodox Greek population. Feryal Tansuğ judges that it is difficult to determine the degree to which the islanders recognised Ottoman rule. After the island became Ottoman soil in 1455 it was administered by Ottomans and Venetians at various times. During this period, and particularly during the reign of Kanuni Sultan Süleyman (1520–1566), the island became a foundation within the Ottoman Empire. Relations between the Ottomans and Venetians occasionally led to hostilities – for example, in June 1717 during the Turkish-Venetian War (1714-1718), a tough but ultimately fairly indecisive naval battle between a Venetian fleet, under Lodovico Flangini, and an Ottoman fleet, was fought near Imbros in the Aegean Sea. Nevertheless, the island's residents continued to live in relative peace and prosperity until the 20th century. The population lived modest lives in subsistence economies and were not involved in upheavals, for instance, the Greek War of Independence (1821-1832).

"Although Greek bandits attacked [...] and landed in Imvros and Lemnos in order to take sustenance support, the islanders did not help them so that Ottoman troops drove back the rebellions."

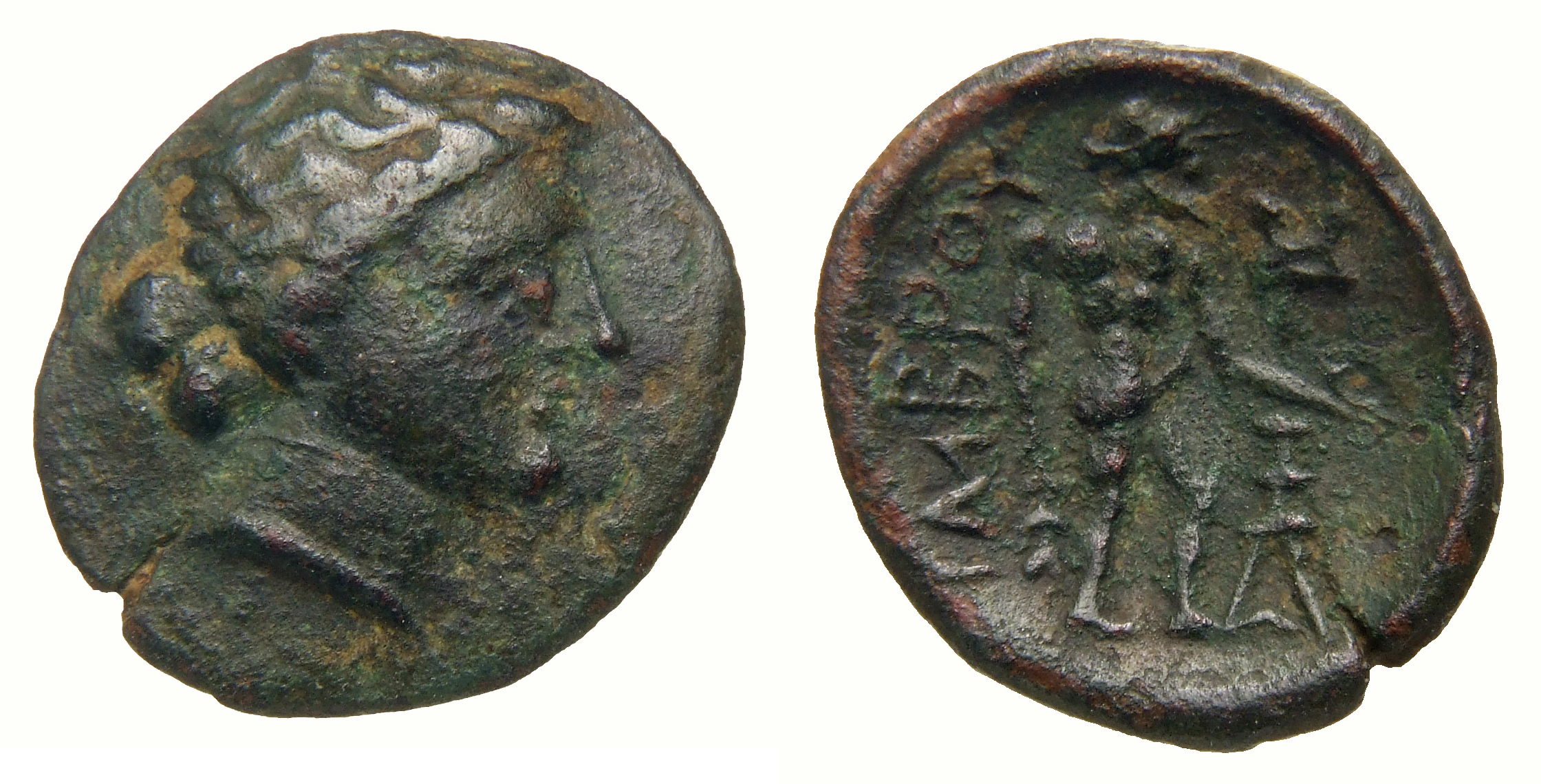
Female head facing right. Reverse: IMBPOY. Ityphallic Hermes Imbramos stands facing right. He holds a branch in his lowered right hand. In front of him on the right is an incense burner (thymiatherion). In the upper right hand is a caduceus (kerykeion). Literature: SNG Copenhagen Nos. 952-953 (shortly after ca. 350 BC).

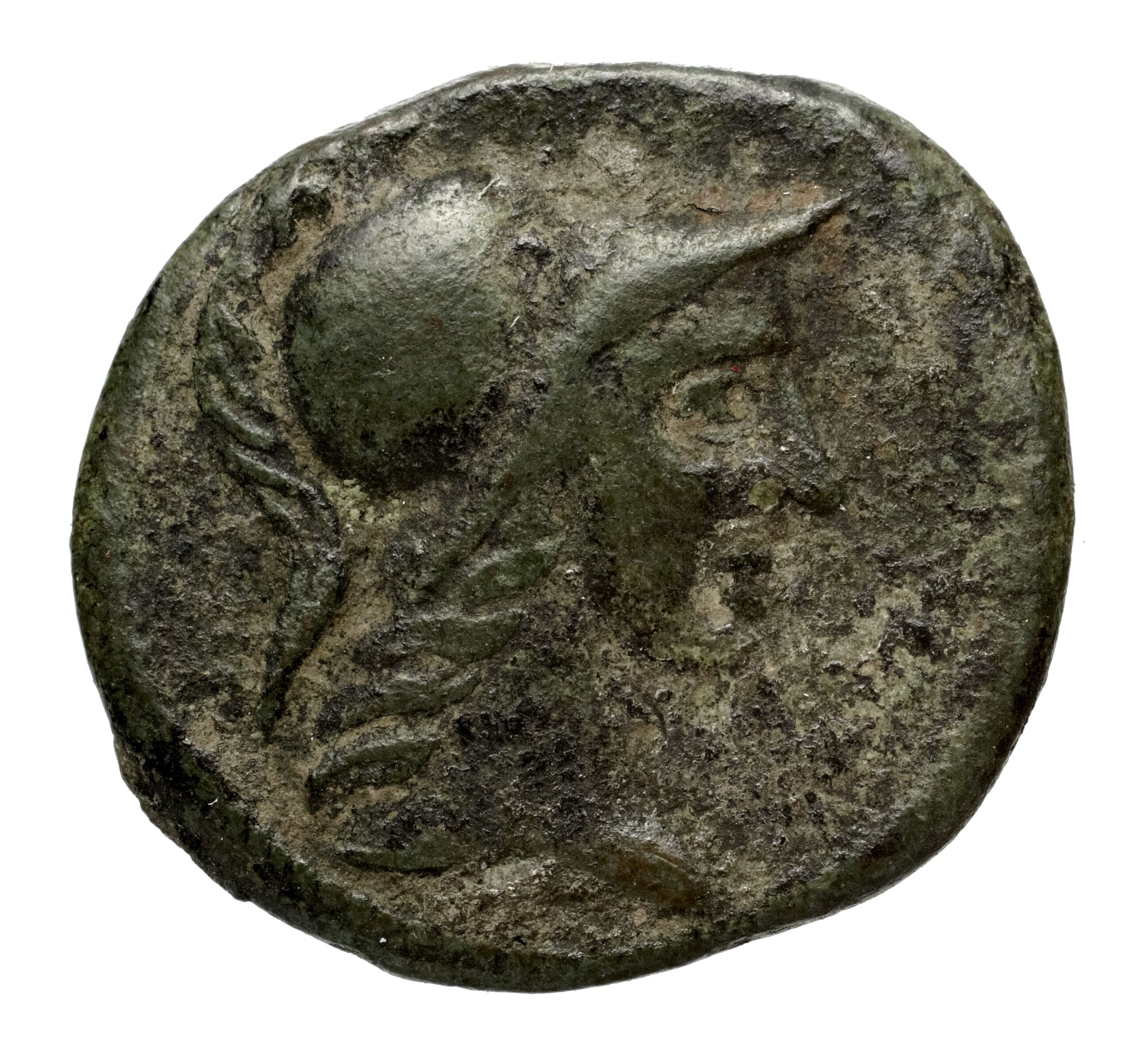
Monnaie - Bronze, Thrace, Imbros

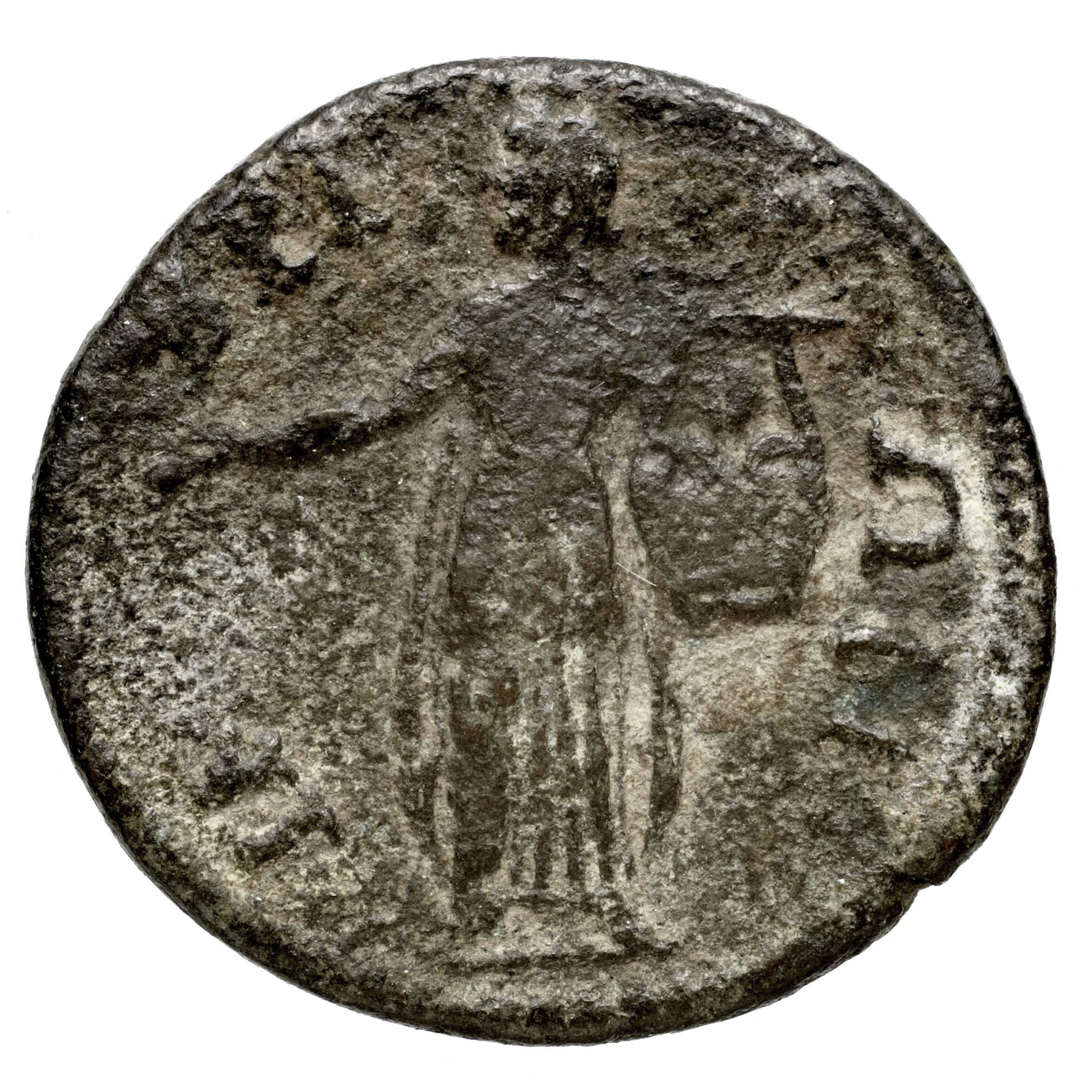
Monnaie - Bronze, Thrace, Imbros

Only in 1864 with the promulgation of the new Vilâyet Law was the administrative status of the island in regard to the central government defined. Two administrative districts were formed—the Kazâ/Jurisdiction of İmroz and Bozcaada of the Sanjak/District of Lemnos, a subdivision of the larger province of Eyalet/Administrative Division of the Islands of the Aegean Sea. Prominent Ottoman politician, Ismail Qemal Bej Vlora, who spent about a year during the mid-1870s superintending the workings of a lignite mine upon the island, remarked that:

"The sole authority in the place was the müdür (a sort of mayor appointed by the Government [whose attributions included tax collection, executing the court sentences, and at times mediation of disputes and pacification of the locals]), who was a charming Albanian, and more like the father of this island family than a representative of government. There were four or five gendarmes recruited from among the Greeks of the country, who did not even know where their arms were, so little did they ever find need of using them —and it is doubtful if they would have known how to if the occasion had arisen...We passed whole weeks without communication with the outside world. No telegrams came, nor couriers, nor newspapers, nor anything else to disturb our hermit's life amid this beautiful scenery and among a population that is perhaps the quietest and simplest in the world. There are no pleasures there except the songs of young Greeks and the country dances."

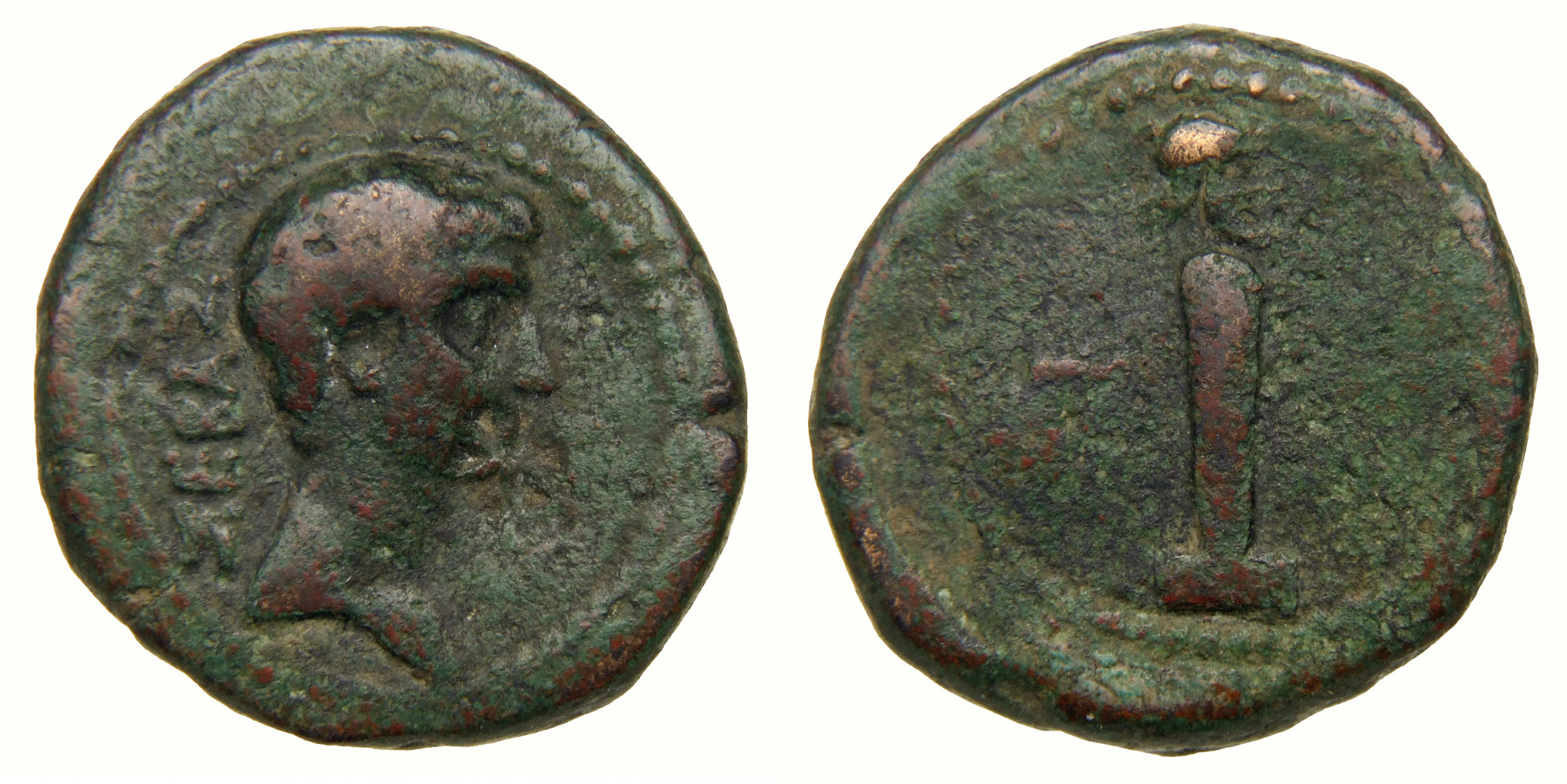
Male head facing right. Reverse: Herm (Hermes Imbrianos) facing right. Literature: RPC I No. 1735,6 (this piece, under Augustus); S. Schultz, Acquisitions of the Coin Cabinet (Department of Antiquity), Research and Reports 27, 1989, 4 No. 4 (this piece).

In 1912 during the First Balkan War, the Greek Navy invaded the island. The island had an absolute Greek majority population of 8,506 people then. After the signing of the Treaty of Athens in 1913, all of the Aegean islands except Bozcaada and Gökçeada were ceded to Greece.

The oldest and only surviving Ottoman-era mosque on Gökçeada is the Gökçeada Merkez Camii (also known as the Hamidiye Mosque), located in the Çınarlı Neighborhood of the island's central town. Historical archives indicate it was originally built around 1876–1878 during the reign of Sultan Abdülhamid II, and later substantially renovated in 1907

=== First World War ===
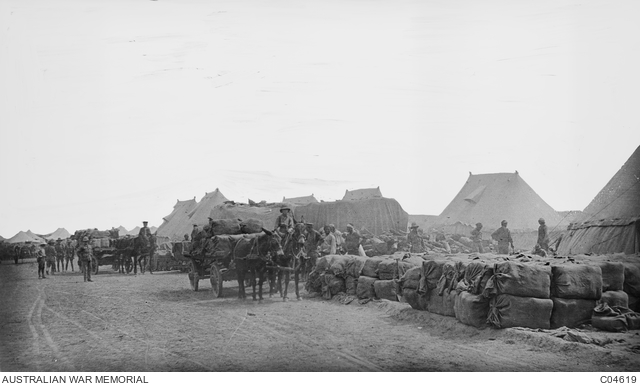
Australian Army Service Corps wagons loading bread at the First Australian Field Bakery, at Imbros (c.1915)

In 1915, Imbros played an important role as a staging post for the allied Mediterranean Expeditionary Force, prior to and during the invasion of the Gallipoli peninsula. A field hospital, airfield and administrative and stores buildings were constructed on the island. In particular, many ANZAC (Australian and New Zealand Army Corps) soldiers were based at Imbros during the Gallipoli campaign, and the island was used as an air and naval base by ANZAC, British, and French forces against Turkey. The headquarters of General Ian Hamilton were on Imbros.

On 20 January 1918, a naval action (see Battle of Imbros (1918)) took place in the Aegean near the island when an Ottoman squadron engaged a flotilla of the British Royal Navy.

Patrick Shaw-Stewart wrote his famous poem "Achilles in the Trench", one of the best-known war poems of the First World War, while he was on Imbros. He seemed to enjoy speaking ancient Greek to the inhabitants of Imbros. In one of his letters he wrote: "here I am, living in a Greek village and talking the language of Demosthenes to the inhabitants (who are really quite clever at taking my meaning)."

=== Between Turkey and Greece ===
Between November 1912 and September 1923, Imbros, together with Tenedos, were under the administration of the Greek navy. Both islands were overwhelmingly ethnically Greek, and in the case of Imbros the population was entirely Greek.

Negotiations to end the Balkan war started in December 1912 in London and the issue of the Aegean islands was one persistent problem. The issue divided the great powers with Germany, Austria-Hungary, and Italy supporting the Ottoman position for return of all the Aegean islands and Britain and France supporting the Greek position for Greek control of all the Aegean islands. With Italy controlling key islands in the region, major power negotiations deadlocked in London and later in Bucharest. Romania threatened military action with the Greeks against the Ottomans in order to force negotiations in Athens in November 1913. Eventually, Greece and the United Kingdom pressured the Germans to support an agreement where the Ottomans would retain Tenedos, Kastelorizo and Imbros and the Greeks would control the other Aegean islands. The Greeks accepted the plan while the Ottoman Empire rejected the ceding of the other Aegean islands. This agreement would not hold, but the outbreak of World War I and the Turkish War of Independence put the issue to the side.

During World War I Gallipoli Campaign, the British used the island as a supply base and built a 600-metre-long airstrip for military operations.

In 1920, the Treaty of Sèvres with the defeated Ottoman Empire granted the island to Greece. The Ottoman government, which signed but did not ratify the treaty, was overthrown by the new Turkish nationalist Government of Mustafa Kemal Atatürk, based in Ankara. After the Greco-Turkish War ended in Greek defeat in Anatolia, and the fall of Lloyd George and his Middle Eastern policies, the western powers agreed to the Treaty of Lausanne with the new Turkish Republic, in 1923. This treaty made the island part of Turkey; but it guaranteed a special autonomous administrative status for Imbros and Tenedos to accommodate the Greeks, and excluded them from the population exchange that took place between Greece and Turkey, due to their presence there as a majority. Article 14 of the treaty provided specific guarantees safeguarding the rights of minorities in both the nations.

However shortly after the legislation of "Civil Law" on 26 June 1927 (Mahalli Idareler Kanunu), the rights accorded to the Greek population of Imbros and Tenedos were revoked, in violation of the Lausanne Treaty. The island was demoted from an administrative district to a sub-district with the result that the island was to be stripped of its local tribunals. Moreover, the members of the local council were obliged to have adequate knowledge of the Turkish language, which meant that the vast majority of the islanders were excluded. Furthermore, according to this law, the Turkish government retained the right to dissolve this council and in certain circumstances, to introduce police force and other officials consisting of non-islanders. This law also violated the educational rights of the local community and imposed an educational system similar to that followed by ordinary Turkish schools.

Massive scale persecution against the local Greek element started in 1961, as part of the Eritme Programmi operation that aimed at the elimination of Greek education and the enforcement of economic, psychological pressure and violence. Under these conditions the Turkish government approved the appropriation of the 90% of the cultivated areas of the island and the settlement of additional 6,000 ethnic Turks from mainland Turkey. The Turkish Government, also, closed the Greek schools on the island and classified it as "supervised zone", which meant that expatriates could not visit the island and their homes without special admission. Greeks on the island were also targeted by the construction of an open prison on the island that included inmates convicted of rape and murder, who were then allowed to roam freely on the island and harass locals. Some are said to have committed the same crimes before the prison was closed down in 1992. Farming land was expropriated for the prison. Furthermore, with the 1964 Law on Land Expropriation (No 6830) the farm property of the Greeks on the island was taken away from their owners. In 1965, the first mosque was built in the island. It was named Fatih Camii (Conqueror's Mosque) and was built on an expropriated Greek Orthodox communal property at the capital of the island. Additional population settlements from Anatolia occurred in 1973, 1984 and 2000. The state provided special credit opportunities and agricultural aid in kind to those who would decide to settle in the island. New settlements were created and existing settlements were renamed with Turkish names. The island itself was officially renamed to Gökçeada in 1970. On the other hand, the indigenous Greek population being deprived of its means of production and facing hostile behaviour from the government and the newly arrived settlers, left its native land. The peak of this exodus was in 1974 during the Cyprus crisis.

In 1991, Turkish authorities ended the military "forbidden zone" status on the island.

In 1992, Panimbrian Committee mentioned, that members of the Greek community are "considered by the authorities to be second class citizens" and that the local Greeks are afraid to express their feelings, to protest against certain actions of the authorities or the Turkish settlers, or even to allow anybody to make use of their names when they give some information referring to the violation of their rights, fearing the consequences which they will have to face from the Turkish authorities. In the same year Human Rights Watch report concluded that the Turkish government has denied the rights of the Greek community on Imbros and Tenedos in violation of the Lausanne Treaty and international human rights laws and agreements.

By 2000, only 400 Greeks remained, while the Turks were around 8,000. As of 2015, only 318 Greeks remained on the island, whereas the number of Turks increased to 8,344. However, international pressure resulted in Turkey's authorities relaxing some of the previously imposed restrictions in the 2000s, which, combined with efforts of the Imvrian expatriate communities and the Ecumenical Patriarch Bartholomew, a native of Imbros, allowed the opening of Greek educational establishments on the island as well as the return of some Greeks who had left their native Imbros. In 2022, there were three Greek schools operating on the island, the Greek population of Imbros being over 400 people, whereas the number of Turks has increased to over 10,000.

In November 2019, a team of archaeologists led by Burçin Erdogan unearthed an approximately 8,000-year-old T-shaped obelisk in the Uğurlu-Zeytinlik mound. The monument made of two parts connected by seven-meter long walls reminds standing stones in Göbekli Tepe archeological site.

== Geography ==
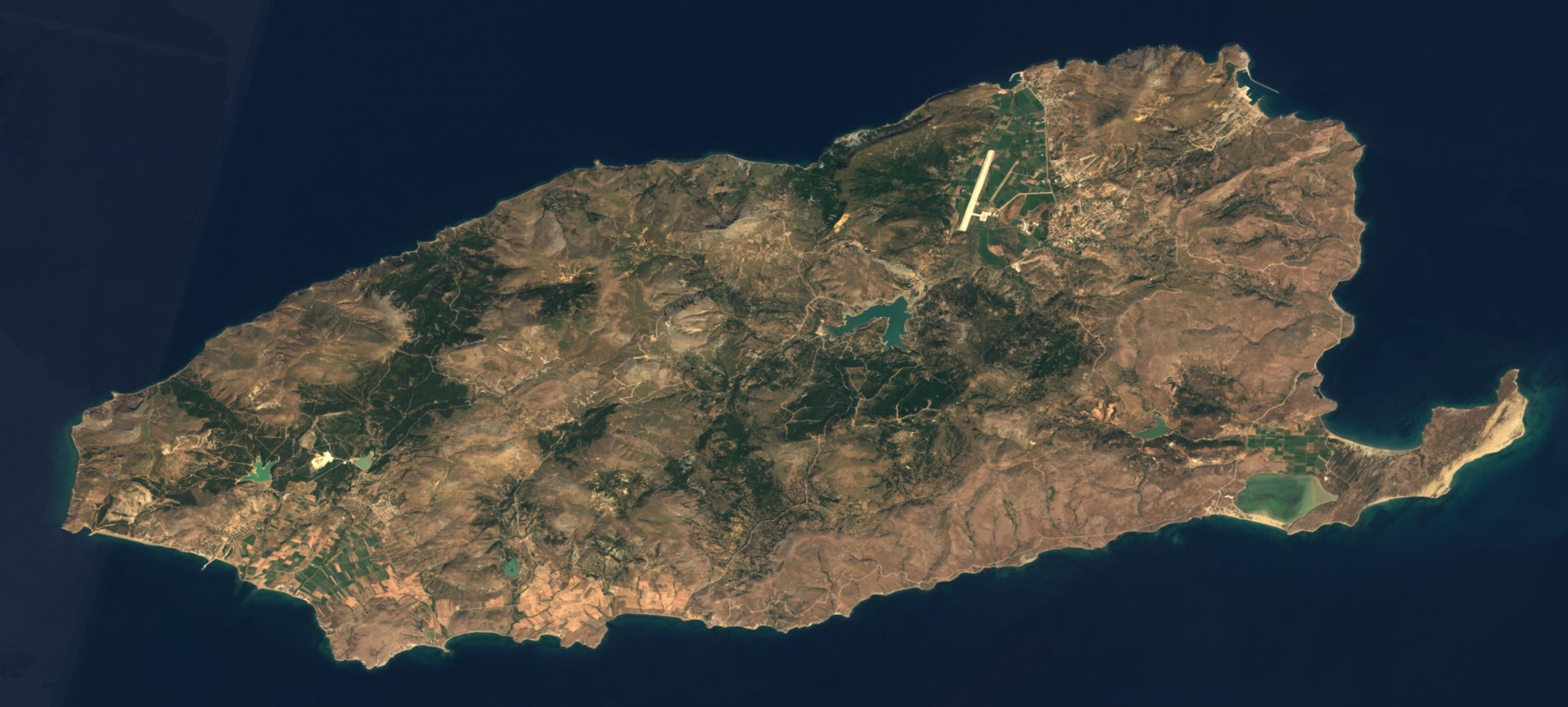
Satellite view of Gökçeada in 2016

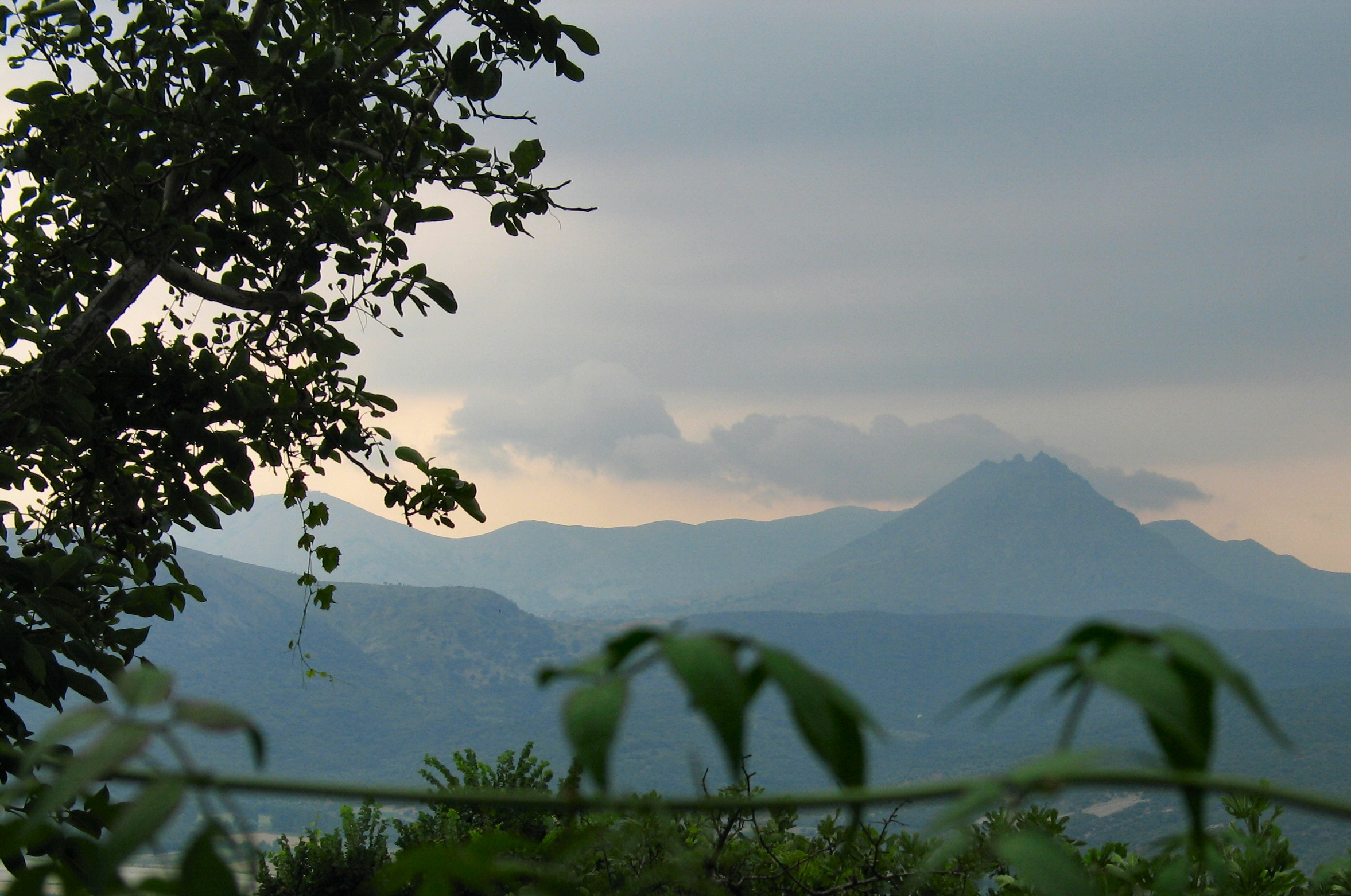
Mountains of Imbros, with the highest mountain, the extinct cone-shaped volcano İlyas Dağ, on the right

=== Geology ===
Imbros is mainly of volcanic origin and the highest mountain of the island İlyas Dağ, is an extinct cone-shaped stratovolcano.

=== Earthquakes ===
Imbros is situated directly south of the North Anatolian Fault, lying within the Anatolian Plate very close to the boundary between the Aegean Sea and Eurasian Plates. This fault zone, which runs from northeastern Anatolia to the northern Aegean Sea, has been responsible for several deadly earthquakes, including in Istanbul, Izmit and Imbros among others, and is a major threat to the island.

On the days of 20–21 August 1859, Imbros experienced some pre-earthquake tremors. The most catastrophic earthquake hit the island at 04:00 on the morning of the August 21, followed by a series of aftershocks—which were recorded to have had lasted until at least January 1860—the most severe of which were recorded at 16:15, 16:25, and 16:35 of the same day. The damage from these tremors was quite significant, as is evident in the descriptions provided from the newspaper, Αμάλθεια (Amalthea), and Schmidt. The publication, Αμάλθεια stated that:

"All the houses in the villages of Παναγία, Γλυκύ, Αγρίδια and Σχοινούδι of Ίμβρος collapsed or suffered cracks from the main earthquake and the three strong aftershocks that followed. The inhabitants remained on the streets and in the fields, without daring to approach the ruins, to get their furniture. Crying and mourning were heard everywhere. The first earthquake knocked down tiles and all the chimneys of the houses. After that the inhabitants left their homes. During the second earthquake, all the houses suffered cracks. The third earthquake caused the collapse of all houses, windmills, watermills, bakeries, and cafes, while churches were severely damaged, but did not collapse. The number of houses that fell was 1400. In various areas, cracks were observed in the ground, from which salt water gushed out, with fine sand. Massive rocks fell from the mountains. The villages of Αγίου Θεοδώρου suffered minor damage. Besides, in Samothrace, these earthquakes were also felt, but no damage was recorded. The same in Τένεδος. In Λήμνος on the contrary, some damage was caused, but it is not known how much. In Λήμνος, however, new sources appeared. In Ίμβρος, the earthquakes continued until the 23rd of the month, but none of the residents were killed."

Schmidt writes that he derives his information about the earthquake mainly from a letter he received in January 1860, after the mediation of Professor Μητσόπουλου, from the deacon Βαρνάβα Κουτλουμουσιανό—an eyewitness to the earthquake. In this letter, it is mentioned that:

"It seems that there were no human losses, but in all areas of the island the destruction was great, as many houses and churches were destroyed. Some springs have disappeared, while others have appeared in areas that were previously dry. There were also cracks in the ground, from which mud with a strong sulphur odour came. The earthquake preceded a violent thunder from the north-east."

On 24 May 2014, Imbros was shaken by a strong earthquake with a magnitude of 6.9 M_{W}. 30 people were injured and numerous old houses were damaged, some of them irreparably. A major earthquake is expected to occur along this fault line in the near future. Minor noticeable earthquakes are common.

=== Climate ===
The island has a Mediterranean climate with warm and dry summers, and wet and cool winters. Although summer is the driest season, some rainfall does occur in summer. Snow and ground frost are not uncommon in winter.

Climate data for Gökçeada (1991–2020)
Month	Jan	Feb	Mar	Apr	May	Jun	Jul	Aug	Sep	Oct	Nov	Dec	Year
Mean daily maximum °C (°F)	9.8 (49.6)	10.7 (51.3)	13.3 (55.9)	17.8 (64.0)	23.2 (73.8)	28.1 (82.6)	30.6 (87.1)	30.7 (87.3)	26.1 (79.0)	20.4 (68.7)	15.6 (60.1)	11.3 (52.3)	19.8 (67.6)
Daily mean °C (°F)	7.0 (44.6)	7.4 (45.3)	9.6 (49.3)	13.5 (56.3)	18.3 (64.9)	22.9 (73.2)	25.3 (77.5)	25.4 (77.7)	21.4 (70.5)	16.7 (62.1)	12.5 (54.5)	8.6 (47.5)	15.7 (60.3)
Mean daily minimum °C (°F)	4.4 (39.9)	4.7 (40.5)	6.6 (43.9)	9.9 (49.8)	14.2 (57.6)	18.4 (65.1)	20.8 (69.4)	21.2 (70.2)	17.8 (64.0)	13.8 (56.8)	9.9 (49.8)	6.2 (43.2)	12.4 (54.3)
Average precipitation mm (inches)	109.28 (4.30)	88.03 (3.47)	88.02 (3.47)	55.04 (2.17)	36.66 (1.44)	23.45 (0.92)	14.29 (0.56)	8.46 (0.33)	33.33 (1.31)	73.37 (2.89)	99.35 (3.91)	121.88 (4.80)	751.16 (29.57)
Average precipitation days (≥ 1.0 mm)	7.2	7.3	6.8	5.8	4.2	2.5	2.2	1.8	3.3	4.9	6.6	9.6	62.2
Average relative humidity (%)	79.4	77.2	74.2	68.9	66.9	62.5	59.9	61.3	65.0	73.4	77.9	79.6	70.5
Source: NOAA

=== Town ===
Location of Imbros (Gökçeada) and Tenedos (Bozcaada)

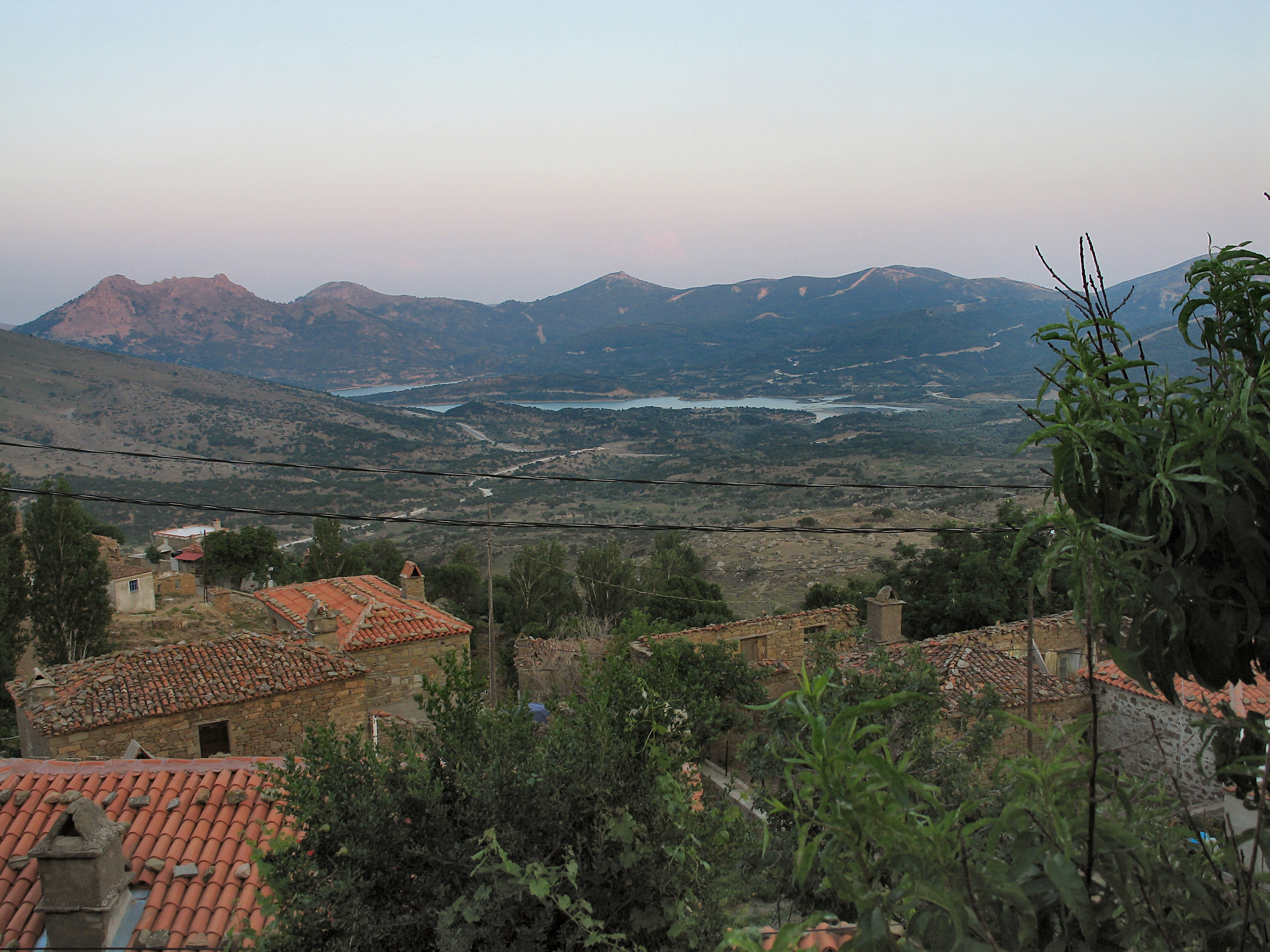
View of Imbros' artificial lake from the village of Tepeköy

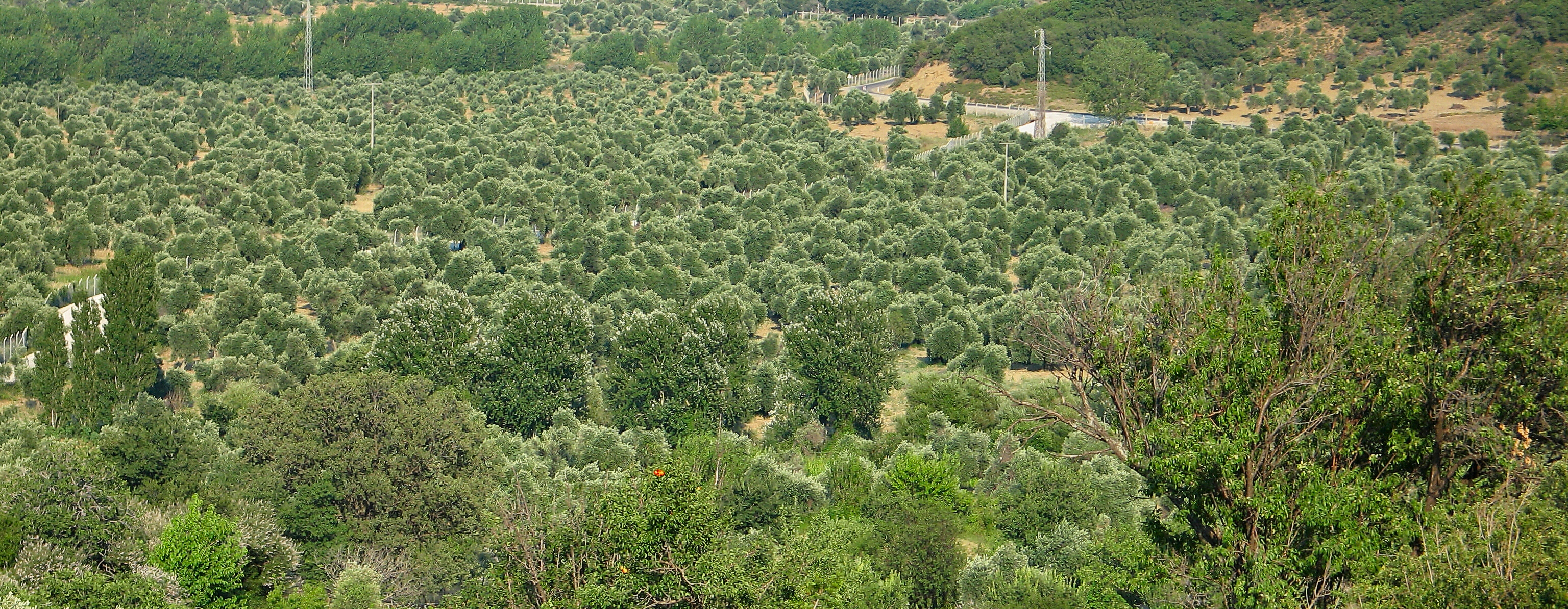
Olive groves in Zeytinli

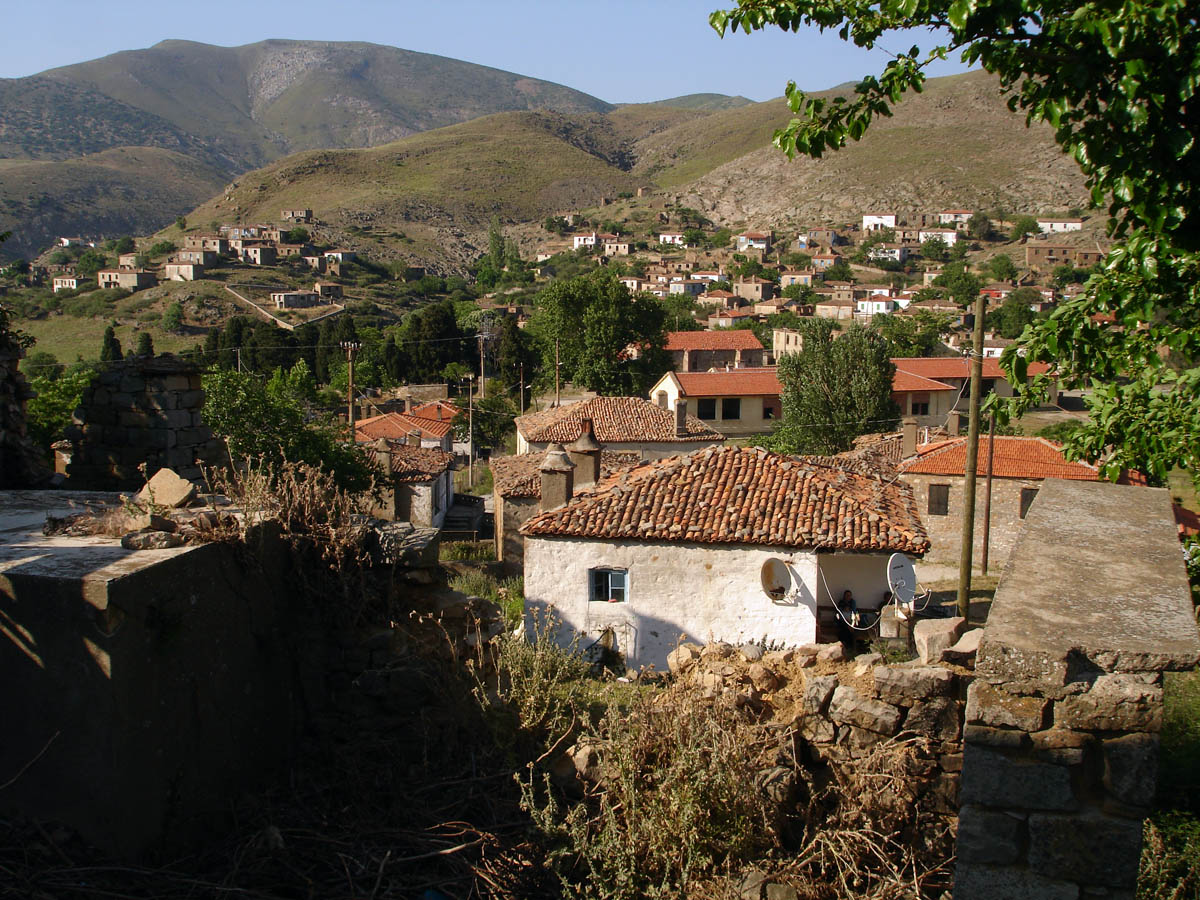
Village of Dereköy

Çınarlı
Çınarlı (also known as "Gökçeada" or "Merkez" meaning "center") is the only town on Imbros, known as Panaghia Balomeni (Παναγία Μπαλωμένη) in Greek; there is a small airport nearby.

=== Villages ===
Most of the settlements on Imbros were given Turkish names in 1926.

Bademli köyü
Older Greek name is Gliky (Γλυκύ). It is located to the northeast of the island, between Çınarlı town and Kaleköy/Kastro.
Dereköy
Older Greek name is Schoinoudi (Σχοινούδι). It is located at the center of the west side of island. Due to the emigration of the Greek population (largely to Australia and the USA; some to Greece and Istanbul before the 1970s), Dereköy is largely empty today. However, many people return on every 15 August for the festival of the Virgin Mary.
Eşelek / Karaca köyü
It is located at the southeast of the island. It is an agricultural area that produces fruit and vegetables.
Kaleköy
Older name is Kastro (Κάστρο) (Latin and Greek for castle). Located on the north-eastern coast of island, there is an antique castle near the village. Kaleköy also has a small port which was constructed by the French Navy during the occupation of the island in the First World War, and is now used for fishing-boats and yachts.
Şahinkaya köyü
It is located near Dereköy.
Şirinköy
It is located in the southwest of island.
Tepeköy
Older Greek name is Agridia (Αγρίδια). It is located in the north of the island, and is home to the largest Greek population among all villages. İlyas Dağ, an extinct volcano located to the south of the village, has an elevation of 673 m (2,208 ft), which makes it the highest point of the island.
Uğurlu köyü
It is located in the west of the island.
Yeni Bademli köyü
It is located at the center-northeast of the island, near Bademli. It has many motels and pensions.
Yenimahalle
Older Greek name is Evlampion (Ευλάμπιον). It is located near the town of Çınarlı on the road to Kuzulimanı port.
Zeytinliköy
Older Greek name is Agios Theodoros (Άγιος Θεόδωρος). Demetrios Archontonis, known as Ecumenical Patriarch Bartholomew I of Constantinople, was born there on 29 February 1940. The village has beautiful historic Greek houses and gets its Turkish name from the surrounding olive groves (Zeytinli köy meaning "Olive-ville" in Turkish.) The village is very popular among tourists during high season.
Others
Yeni Bademli köyü, Eşelek / Karaca köyü, Şahinkaya köyü, Şirinköy and Uğurlu köyü were established after 1970.

=== Cittaslow ===
Gökçeada is one of the eight "cittaslows" of Turkey and is the second in being accepted as one, after Seferihisar.

=== Places to see ===
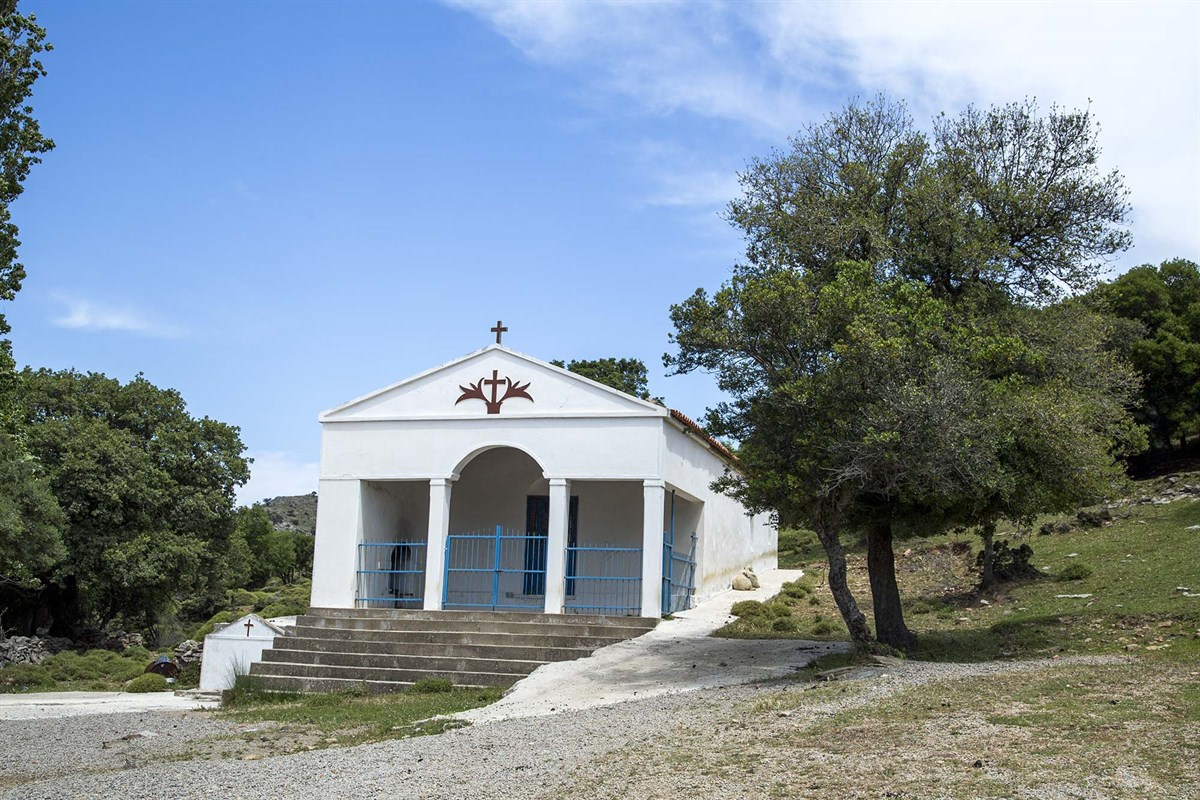
A Chapel in Tepeköy, Gökçeada.

- Aydıncık/Kefaloz (Kefalos) beach: Best location for windsurfing
- Kapıkaya (Stenos) beach:
- Kaşkaval peninsula / (Kaskaval): Scuba diving
- Kuzulimanı (Haghios Kyrikas): Ferryport with 24-hour ferries to Gelibolu–Kabatepe port and Çanakkale port.
- Mavikoy/Bluebay: The first national underwater park in Turkey. Scuba diving allowed for recreational purposes.
- Marmaros beach: Also has a small waterfall.
- Pınarbaşı (Spilya) beach: Longest (and most sandy) beach on the island.

== Environment ==
=== Gökçeada (imroz) sheep ===
This ancient native breed of sheep is named after the island where it was established. The sheep is suitable for milk and meat. Outside the island, it is still farmed in Çanakkale.

=== Marine ===
Water from the Black and Marmara Seas mixing with the warmer saltier water of the Aegean Sea supports a rich marine ecosystem.

=== Wind ===
Offshore wind power may be developed in future. At the moment, there are some wind turbines generating energy on the island.

=== Issues ===
Environmental issues include litter.

== Economy ==
Swordfish are caught in season.

== Population ==
=== Greek population ===
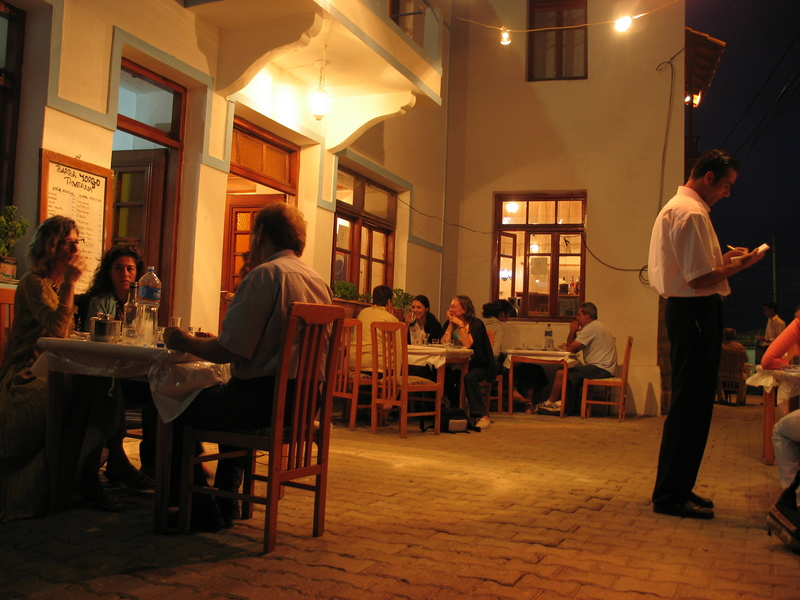
Barba Yorgo's taverna in Tepeköy

The island was primarily inhabited by ethnic Greeks from ancient times through to approximately the 1960s. Data dating from 1922 taken under Greek rule and 1927 data taken under Turkish rule showed a strong majority of Greek inhabitants on Imbros, and the Greek Orthodox Church had a strong presence on the island. The Turkish census of 1927 states that the island's population was almost exclusively Greek Orthodox and numbered 6,762 (with Turks accounting only 157).

Article 14 of the Treaty of Lausanne (1923) exempted Imbros and Tenedos from the large-scale population exchange that took place between Greece and Turkey, and required Turkey to accommodate the local Greek majority and their rights:

The islands of Imbros and Tenedos, remaining under Turkish sovereignty, shall enjoy a special administrative organisation composed of local elements and furnishing every guarantee for the native non-Moslem population insofar as concerns local administration and the protection of persons and property. The maintenance of order will be assured therein by a police force recruited from amongst the local population by the local administration above provided for and placed under its orders.

However, the treaty provisions relating to administrative autonomy for Imbros and protections of minority populations was never implemented by the Turkish government." The result was a significant decline in the Greek population of the island.

A diaspora of approximately 15,000 Imbriots based mostly in Greece maintains strong links to the island. However, large populations of Imbriots reside in Australia, South Africa, Turkey, Egypt, the Americas, and Western Europe.

=== Human rights ===
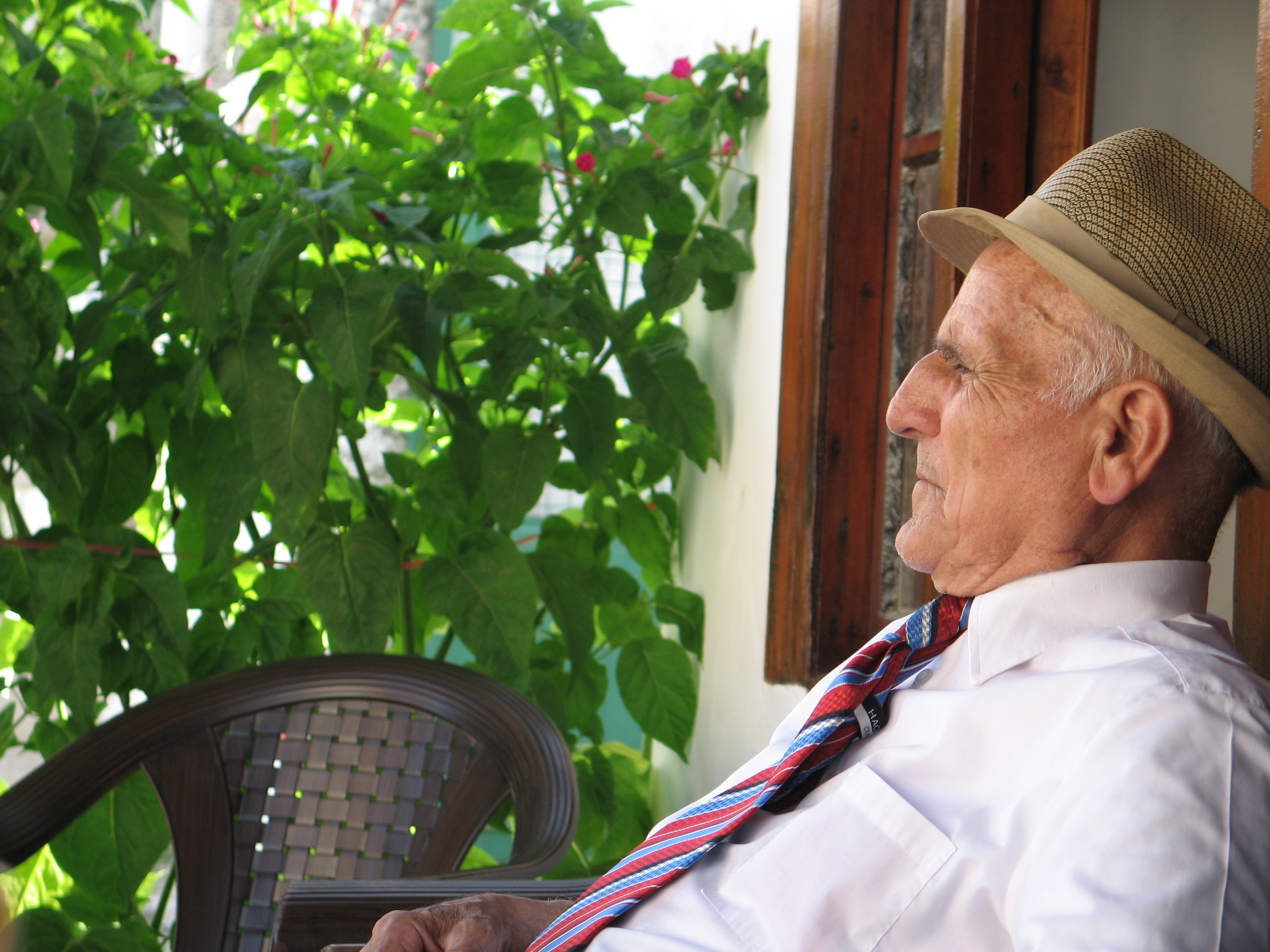
Co-owner of the famous "Madam'ın Dibek Kahvesi" in Aghios Theodoros (Zeytinli), Imbros. Circa 2005.

The following grievances apply particularly to Imbros:

- On 4 October 1923, following the installation of Turkish authorities on the island, the elected government of the island were dismissed, and installed mainlanders. At the same time, 1,500 Imbriots who had taken refuge from the Turkish War of Independence on Lemnos and in Thessaloniki were classified as personae non gratae, denied the right to return, and their property was confiscated.
- With the passing of Law 1151 on 25 June 1927, the system of local administration on Imbros was abolished, closed the Greek schools, and prohibited instruction in the language. In 1952–3, the Greek Imbriots were permitted to build new ones, closed again in 1964. Since 2013, the decision to restrict the use of the Greek language in instruction has been reversed.
- In 1943, Turkey arrested the Metropolitan of Imbros and Tenedos with other Orthodox clerics. They also confiscated the lands on Imbros belonging to the monasteries of Great Lavra and Koutloumousiou on Mount Athos, expelled the tenants, and installed settlers; when the Mayor of Imbros and four village elders protested, they were arrested and sent to the mainland.
- Between 1964 and 1984, almost all the usable land on Imbros had been expropriated (98% by 1990), for inadequate compensation, for an army camp, a minimum-security prison, reforestation projects, a dam project, and a national park.
- Nikolas Palaiopoulos, a town councilor, was arrested and imprisoned in 1962 for complaining to the Greek Ambassador on the latter's visit to Imbros; he, together with the Mayor of Imbros and 20 others, was imprisoned again in 1974.
- The old Cathedral at Kastro (Kaleköy) was desecrated on the night of the Turkish landing on Cyprus in 1974; the present Cathedral was looted in March 1993; criminal activities have included a number of rapes and murders, officially blamed on convicts and soldiers, but none of them has been solved.
- In September of 1973, convicts left to freely roam murdered Stelios Cavalleros, a shop-owner from Panagia, his descreated body was found at the bottom of a well by neighbours; In the summer of 1977, Styliani Zouni, mother of two young children, was raped and murdered by a Turkish soldier in the village of Agioi Theodoroi; In July of 1980, Georgios Viglis of Schoinoudi was tortured and murdered by convicts in his farmhouse; In 1983, Efstratios Stylianidis and Nikolaos Ladas were murdered by settlers from Anatolia, the former in Schoinoudi and the latter in Panagia; In November of 1990 Zafeirios Delikonstantis, the president of Glyky, was murdered by a Turkish settler; in May of 2019 Zafeirios Pinaris of Evlambio was tortured and murdered
- Through the latter half of the 20th century, the Turkish government implemented a program to settle Turkish people from Anatolia on Imbros and Tenedos (Bozcaada).
- On 28 October 2010, the Greek cemetery of the island was desecrated, an action condemned by the Turkish Ministry of Foreign Affairs.

=== Population change in Imbros ===
Discrimination against the island's Greek population as well as geopolitical tensions have led to the Greeks emigrating from both islands, the peak of this exodus occurring in 1974, when Turkey invaded Cyprus. According to 1927 Population Census, Imbros population was 6,555 Greeks, and 157 Turks; in contrast at the 2000 Population Census the Greeks had become a minority on the island.

In 2014 there were around 300 Greeks and 8,300 Turks. Most of the former Greeks of Imbros and Tenedos are in diaspora in Greece, the United States, and Australia.

In September 2015, a Greek school on Imbros was reopened after 51 years of prohibition of Greek education. As of 2015, there were 14 students, only one of whom was born on the island, the rest from diaspora families that returned to the island. In addition, a member of the Greek community is serving on the Imbros municipal police force as of 2015.

By 2019, the Greek population of the island had increased to 400, mainly due to increasing numbers of returnees from the diaspora. In 2020, there were three Greek schools with 53 students.

Turks
Greeks

Town and villages	1893		1927		1970		1975		1980		1985		1990		1997		2000		2018	
Çınarlı (Παναγιά/Panagiá)	-	-	-	-	3578	615	3806	342	4251	216	767	70	721	40	553	26	503	29	490	41
Bademli (Γλυκύ/Glyký)	-	-	-	-	66	144	1	57	40	1	13	34	29	22	15	15	15	13	11	17
Dereköy (Σχοινούδι/Schoinoúdi)	-	-	-	-	73	672	391	378	319	214	380	106	99	68	82	40	68	42	63	50
Eşelek	-	-	-	-	-	-	-	-	-	-	-	-	-	-	-	-	152	-	170	-
Fatih	-	-	-	-	-	-	-	-	-	-	3962	45	4284	32	4135	21	4180	25	4300	32
Kaleköy (Κάστρο/Kástro)	-	-	-	-	38	36	24	-	-	128	94	-	105	-	90	-	89	-	84	-
Şahinkaya	-	-	-	-	-	-	-	-	-	-	-	-	168	-	107	-	86	-	95	-
Şirinköy	-	-	-	-	-	-	-	-	-	-	-	-	-	-	-	-	189	-	200	-
Tepeköy, Gökçeada (Αγρίδια/Agrídia)	-	-	-	-	3	504	4	273	2	193	1	110	75	2	2	39	2	42	25	140
Uğurlu (Λιβούνια / Livoúnia)	-	-	-	-	-	-	-	-	-	-	460	-	490	-	466	-	401	-	420	-
Yenibademli	-	-	-	-	-	-	-	-	-	-	416	-	660	-	628	-	581	-	595	-
Yenimahalle (Ευλάμπιον/Evlámpion)	-	-	-	-	182	143	162	121	231	81	359	59	970	27	2240	25	2362	27	2600	30
Zeytinliköy (Άγιοι Θεόδωροι/Ágioi Theódoroi)	-	-	-	-	30	507	15	369	36	235	72	162	25	130	12	82	12	76	25	110
TOTAL	99	9,357	157	6555	3970	2621	4403	1540	4879	1068	6524	586	7626	321	8330	248	8640	226	8983	420

== Culture ==
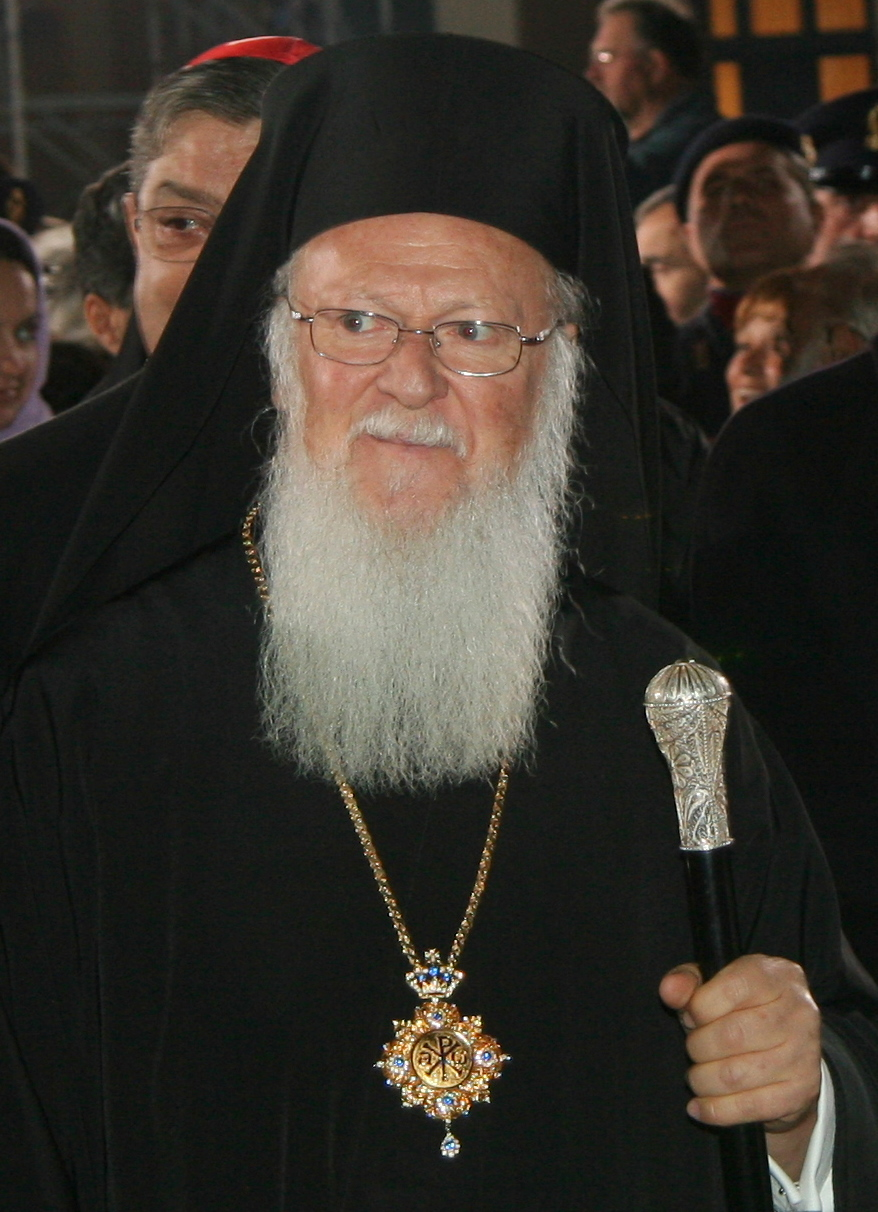
Ecumenical Patriarch Bartholomew I was born in the village of Aghios Theodoros (Zeytinliköy)

A Turkish documentary of 2013, Rüzgarlar (Winds), by Selim Evci, is focused on the discriminatory government policies of the 1960s against the Greek population.

Another Turkish film, My Grandfather's People, is based on the population exchange between Turkey and Greece in 1923. Among other places, some scenes were filmed in Imbros.

== Notable people from Imbros ==
- Iakovos, Greek Orthodox Archbishop of America (born Demetrios Koukouzis (Δημήτριος Κουκούζης) in 1911)
- Bartholomew I, Orthodox Christian Patriarch of Constantinople (born Dimitrios Archontonis (Δημήτριος Αρχοντώνης) in 1940)

== See also ==
- Treaty of Lausanne
- Greco-Turkish relations
- Expulsion of Greeks from Istanbul
- Treaty of Sèvres
- Tenedos
