= Maximus V of Constantinople =

Ecumenical Patriarch of Constantinople from 1946 to 1948

Maximus V
- 267th Archbishop of Constantinople, New Rome and Ecumenical Patriarch
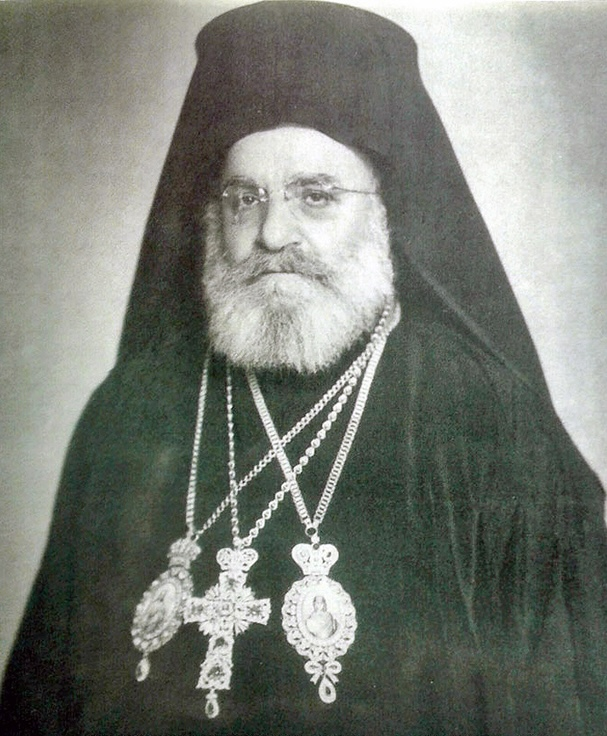
- Patriarch Maximos V, 1946
- Church: Ecumenical Patriarchate of Constantinople
- In office: 20 February 1946 – 19 October 1948
- Predecessor: Benjamin I
- Successor: Athenagoras I

Personal details
- Born: Maximos Vaportzis; 26 October 1897 Sinop, Ottoman Empire
- Died: 1 January 1972 (aged 74) Fenerbahçe, Kadıköy, Turkey
- Denomination: Eastern Orthodoxy

Ecumenical Patriarch Maximus V (Greek: Μάξιμος Εʹ; 26 October 1897 – 1 January 1972) was the 267th Ecumenical Patriarch of Constantinople from February 1946 until his resignation in October 1948, serving as the primus inter pares (first among equals) and spiritual leader of Easter Orthodox Christianity worldwide.

== Biography ==
He was born Maximos Vaportzis in the Ottoman Empire, at Sinop in Kastamonu Vilayet, on the Black Sea coast. He was first educated, under the protection of metropolitan bishop Germanos Karavaggelis of Amaseia, at the Theological School of Halki, Ottoman Empire.

In 1918, he was ordained a deacon. With this appointment, he also became teacher at the city school of Theira. He served as arch-deacon under Metropolitans Gregorios of Chalcedon and Joachim of Ephesus. In 1920, he became the archdeacon to the Ecumenical Patriarchate itself.

In 1946, he became Patriarch of Constantinople. He was known for his "leftist opinions" and ties with the Patriarch of Moscow and all Rus'. He resigned in 1948, officially because of poor health; unofficially because Western powers did not approve his ties with the Soviet-controlled Patriarch of Moscow. He was succeeded by the archbishop of America, Athenagoras, and was given the title of Ephesus.

He died in Fenerbahçe on 1 January 1972.

== Notes and references ==
Eastern Orthodox Church titles
Preceded by Benjamin I	Ecumenical Patriarch of Constantinople; 1946 – 1948	Succeeded by Athenagoras I
