= Benjamin I =

Benjamin I may refer to:

- Pope Benjamin I of Alexandria, ruled in 623–662
- Benjamin I of Constantinople, Ecumenical Patriarch of Constantinople in 1936–1946
