= Athenagoras I of Constantinople =

Ecumenical Patriarch of Constantinople from 1948 to 1972

Athenagoras I
- 268th Archbishop of Constantinople, New Rome and Ecumenical Patriarch
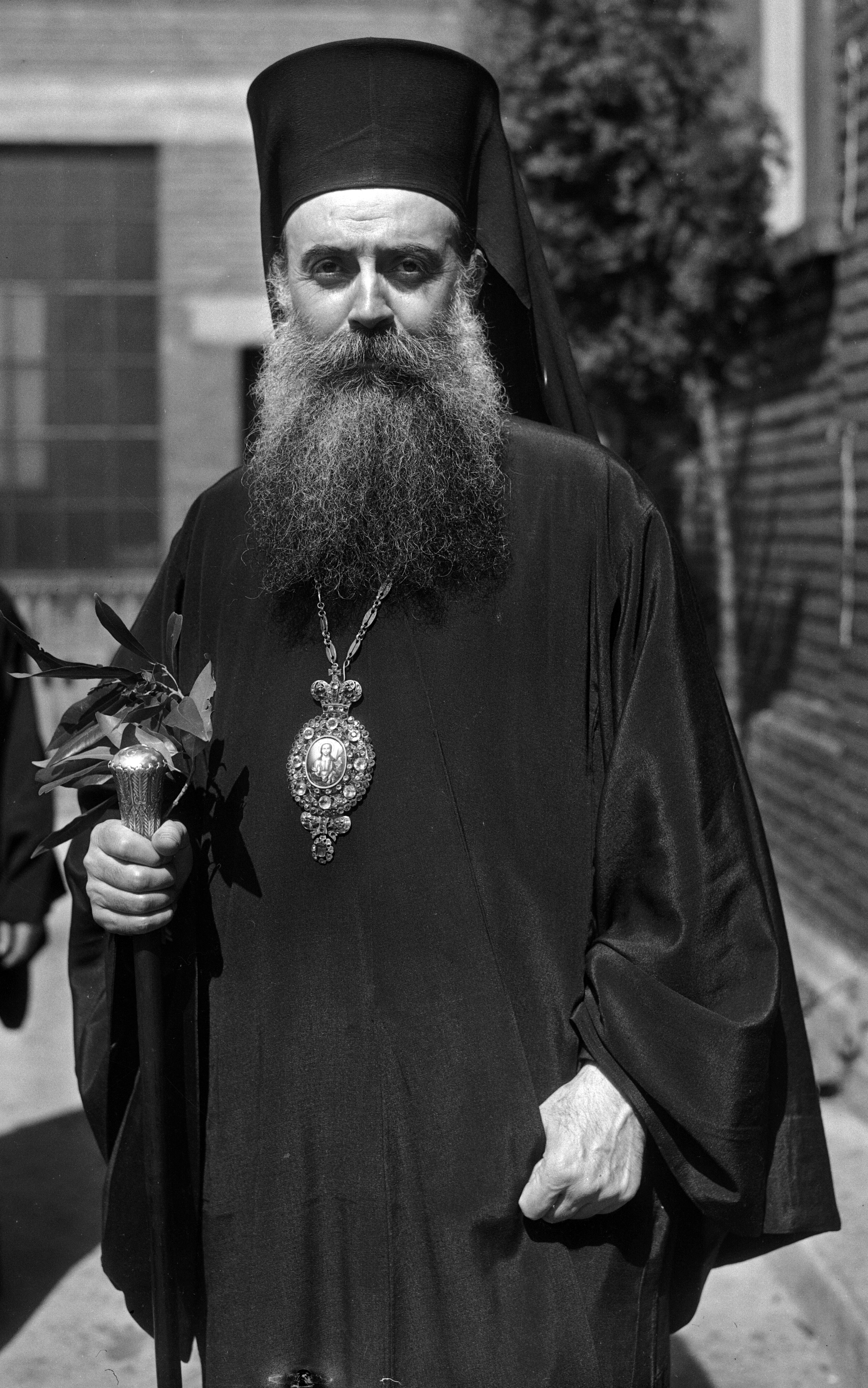
- Patriarch Athenagoras in 1936
- Church: Ecumenical Patriarchate of Constantinople
- Installed: 1 November 1948
- Term ended: 7 July 1972
- Predecessor: Maximus V
- Successor: Demetrios I
- Other posts: Archbishop of North and South America (1931-1948)

Personal details
- Born: Aristocles Matthew Spyrou; 6 April 1886 (25 March) Vasilikón, Janina Vilayet, Ottoman Empire (now Epirus, Greece)
- Died: 7 July 1972 (aged 86) Phanar, Istanbul, Turkey
- Denomination: Eastern Orthodox Church
- Education: Holy Trinity Theological School

Ecumenical Patriarch Athenagoras I (Greek: Αθηναγόρας Αʹ), born Aristocles Matthaiou Spyrou (Greek: Αριστοκλής Ματθαίου Σπύρου; 6 April 1886 (25 March) – 7 July 1972), was the 268th Ecumenical Patriarch of Constantinople from November 1948, until his death in July 1972, serving as the primus inter pares (first among equals) and spiritual leader of Eastern Orthodox Christianity worldwide.

Prior to his election to the Ecumenical Throne, Athenagoras served as the Archbishop of North and South America (GOARCH) from 1930 to 1948, where he played a pivotal role in organizing the Greek Diaspora.

== Biography ==
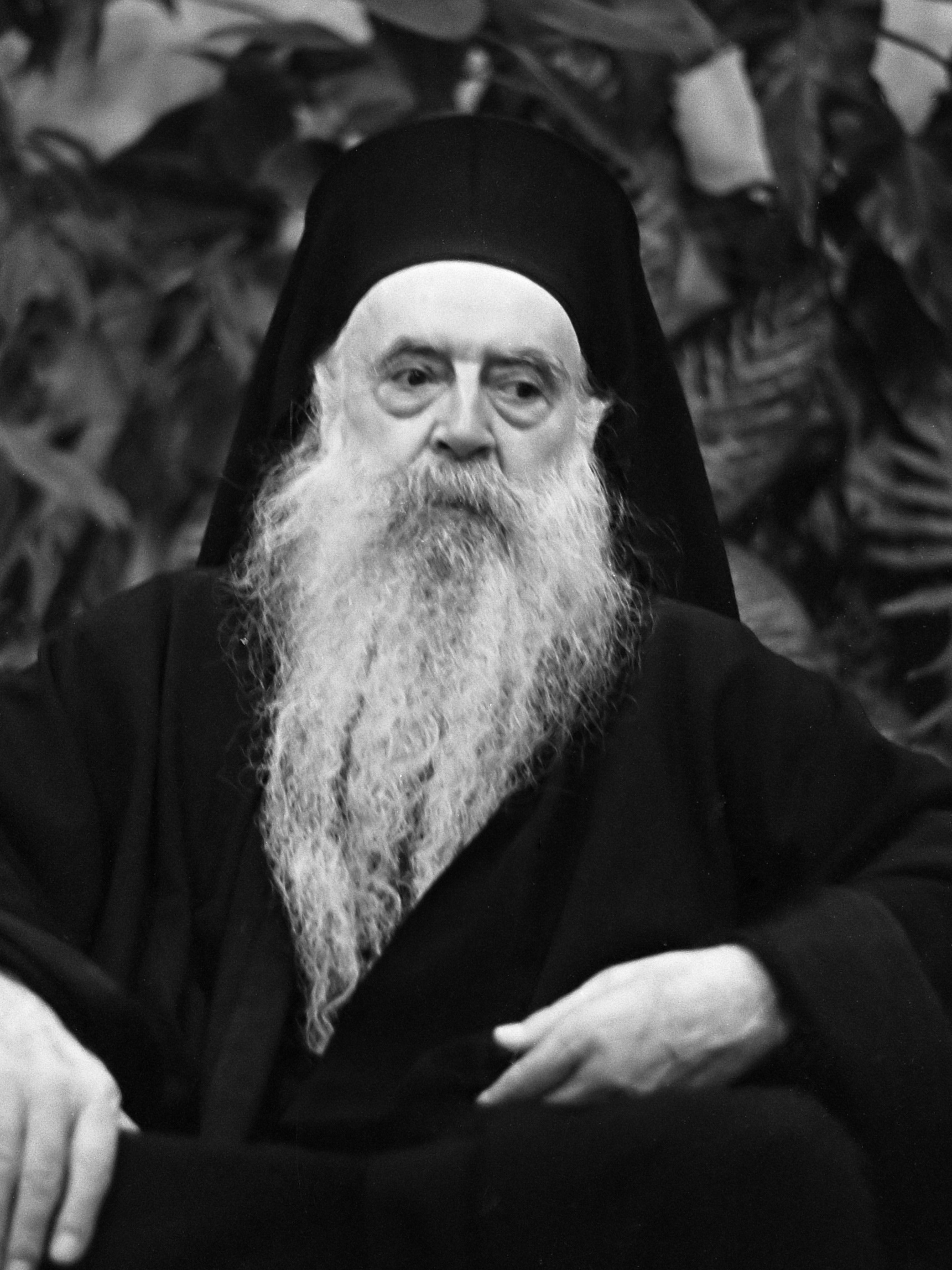
Ecumenical Patriarch Athenagoras I in 1967

Athenagoras was born as Aristocles Matthew Spyrou on 6 April 1886 (25 March) in the village of Vasiliko, near Ioannina, Epirus (then in the Ottoman Empire). He has been described as having been of Aromanian, Albanian, or Greek descent. Athenagoras was the son of Matthew N. Spyrou, a doctor, and Helen V. Mokoros. Athenagoras devoted himself to religion at an early age because of the encouragement he received from his mother and a priest from his village. After completing his secondary education in 1906, he entered the Holy Trinity Theological School at Halki, near Constantinople, and was ordained a deacon in 1910.

Upon graduating, he was tonsured a monk, given the name Athenagoras, and ordained to the diaconate. He served as archdeacon of the Diocese of Pelagonia before becoming the secretary to Archbishop Meletius IV of Constantinople of Athens in 1919. While still a deacon, he was elected the Metropolis of Corfu in 1922 and straightway raised to the episcopacy.

Returning from a fact-finding trip to the Greek Orthodox Archdiocese in America in 1930, Metropolitan Damaskinos recommended to Photius II of Constantinople that he appoint Metropolitan Athenagoras to the position of Archbishop of North and South America as the best person to bring harmony to the American diocese. The patriarch made the appointment on 30 August 1930.

When Archbishop Athenagoras assumed his new position on 24 February 1931, he was faced with the task of bringing unity and harmony to a diocese that was racked with dissension between Royalists and Republicans (Venizelists), who had virtually divided the country into separate dioceses. To correct that, he centralized the ecclesiastical administration in the archdiocese offices with all other bishops serving as auxiliaries, appointed to assist the archbishop, without dioceses and administrative rights of their own. He actively worked with his communities to establish harmony. He expanded the work of the clergy-laity congresses and founded the Holy Cross School of Theology.

Archbishop Athenagoras consecrated the Archdiocesan Cathedral of the Holy Trinity on New York City's Upper East Side on 22 October 1933. He called it: "The Cathedral of all of Hellenism in America". In 1938, Athenagoras was naturalized as a U.S. citizen.

On 1 November 1948, Athenagoras I was elected Patriarch of Constantinople at the age of 62. In January 1949, he was honored to be flown in the personal airplane of the U.S President Harry Truman to Constantinople to assume his new position. As Patriarch, he was actively involved with the World Council of Churches and improving relations with the Roman Catholic Church and the Pope.

He was hospitalized on 6 July 1972, for a broken hip, but died from kidney failure in Istanbul the following day at the age of 86. He was buried in the cemetery within the grounds of the Church of Saint Mary of the Spring in Balıklı, Istanbul.

== Ecumenical relations ==
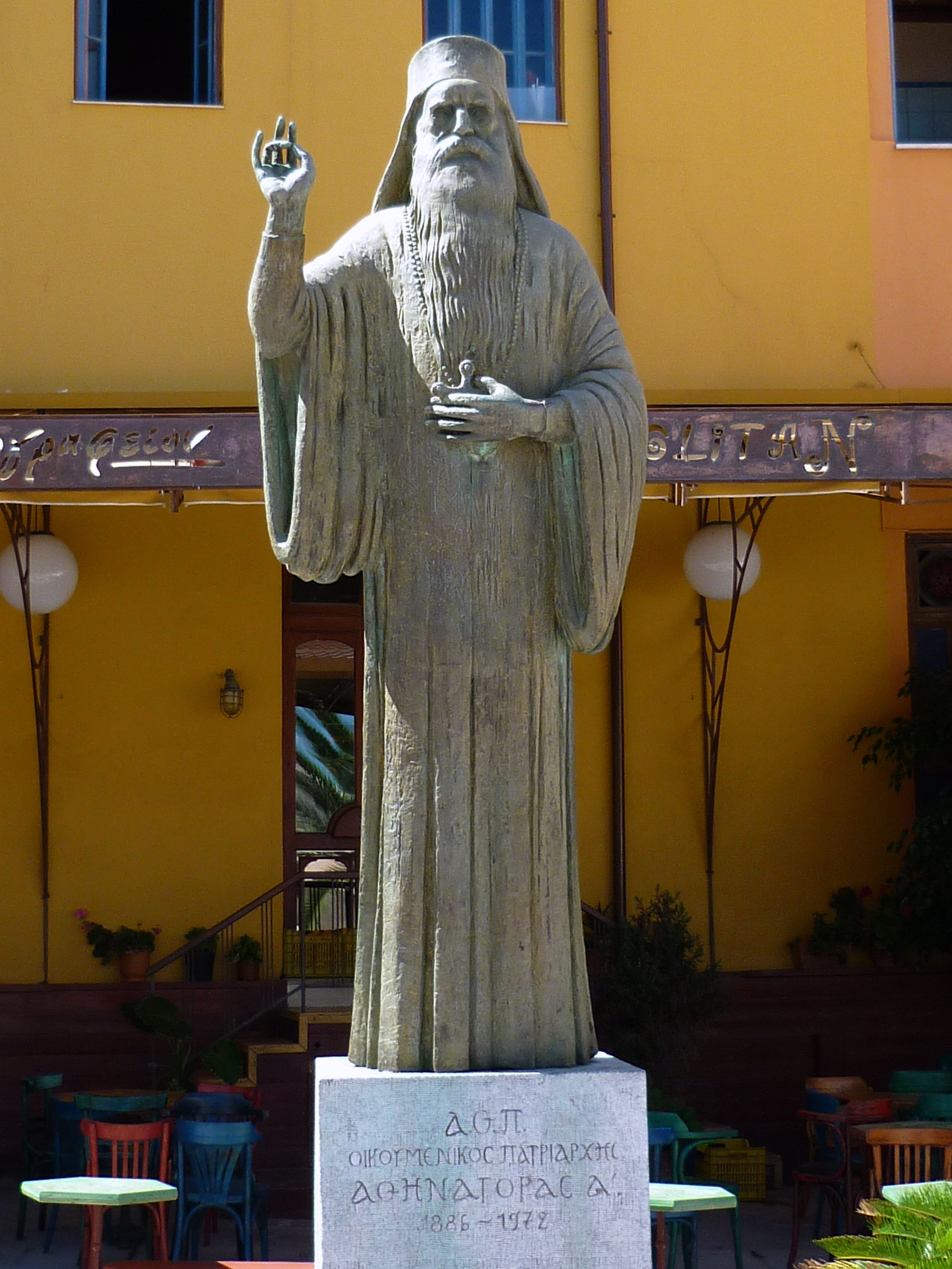
Statue of the Ecumenical Patriarch Athenagoras I of Constantinople in Chania (Crete)

Athenagoras I's meeting with Pope Paul VI in 1964 in Jerusalem led to rescinding the excommunications of 1054 which historically mark the Great Schism, the schism between the churches of the East and West. This was a significant step towards restoring relations between Rome, Constantinople, and the other patriarchates of Eastern Orthodoxy. It produced the Catholic–Orthodox Joint Declaration of 1965, which was read out on 7 December 1965, simultaneously at a public meeting of the Second Vatican Council in Rome and at a special ceremony in Constantinople.

The declaration did not end the 1054 schism but rather showed a desire for reconciliation between the two churches and friendlier relations. Catholic–Eastern Orthodox relations did improve as now neither side was officially calling the other heretics, but it was not an agreement for "full communion" in which both sides would essentially accept the other entirely, nor did such a development come later.

Most Orthodox leaders were mildly positive and accepting toward the move, seeing the old excommunication as too sharp a measure. There was one who strongly objected: Metropolitan Philaret Voznesensky of the Russian Orthodox Church Outside of Russia challenged the Patriarch's efforts at rapprochement in an open letter in 1965. He argued that no rapprochement was possible until the Catholic Church "renounces its new doctrines".

== Bibliography ==
- Block, Maxine; Rothe, Anna Herthe; Candee, Marjorie Dent (1950). Current Biography: Who's News and Why 1949. New York: H. W. Wilson Company.
- Chrissochoidis, Ilias (2013). Spyros P. Skouras: Memoirs (1893–1953). Stanford: Brave World.
- Cianfarra, Camille Maximillian (1950). The Vatican and the Kremlin. New York: E. P. Dutton & Company, Inc.
- Goff, Philip (2010). The Blackwell Companion to Religion in America. Malden and Oxford: John Wiley & Sons. ISBN 978-1-44-432409-9.
- "Time Marches Off". Newsweek. Vol. 80. 1972.

Eastern Orthodox Church titles
Preceded by Maximus V	Ecumenical Patriarch of Constantinople; 1948 – 1972	Succeeded by Demetrius I

Preceded by Alexander	Archbishop of America; 1931–1948	Succeeded by Michael
