= Photios of Constantinople =

Photius of Constantinople may refer to:

- Photius I of Constantinople, Ecumenical Patriarch in 858–867 and 877–886
- Photius II of Constantinople, Ecumenical Patriarch in 1929–1935
