= Kalamış =

Quarter in Istanbul, Turkey

Coordinates: 40°58′42″N 29°02′25″E

- Locality
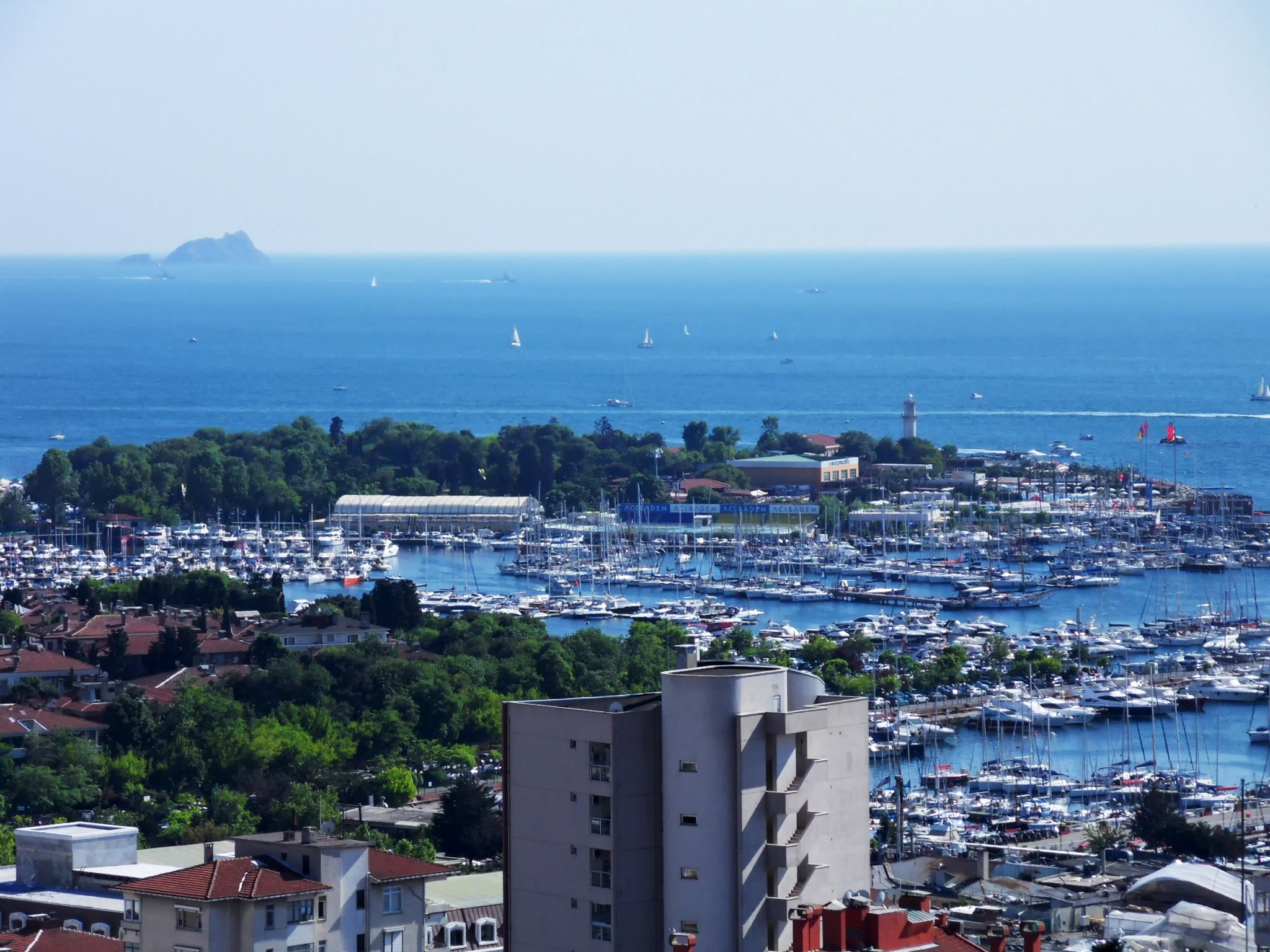
- A view from Kalamış.
- Interactive map of Kalamış
- Province: Istanbul
- District: Kadıköy
- Time zone: UTC+3
- Postal code: 34726

Kalamış is a locality in the district of Kadıköy on the Anatolian side of Istanbul, Turkey. Kalamis is one of the most prestigious and vibrant neighborhood in Istanbul.

It is located between Kurbağalıdere, Kızıltoprak, Feneryolu and Fenerbahçe. It has a large marina and park. There are also some nightclubs and restaurants. Galatasaray Sports Club's Galatasaray Kalamış Facilities is also located there.

Kurbağalıdere flows into Kalamış Bay. Fenerbahçe Sports Club's Dereağzı Facilities are located at the point where Kurbağalıdere empties into the bay.

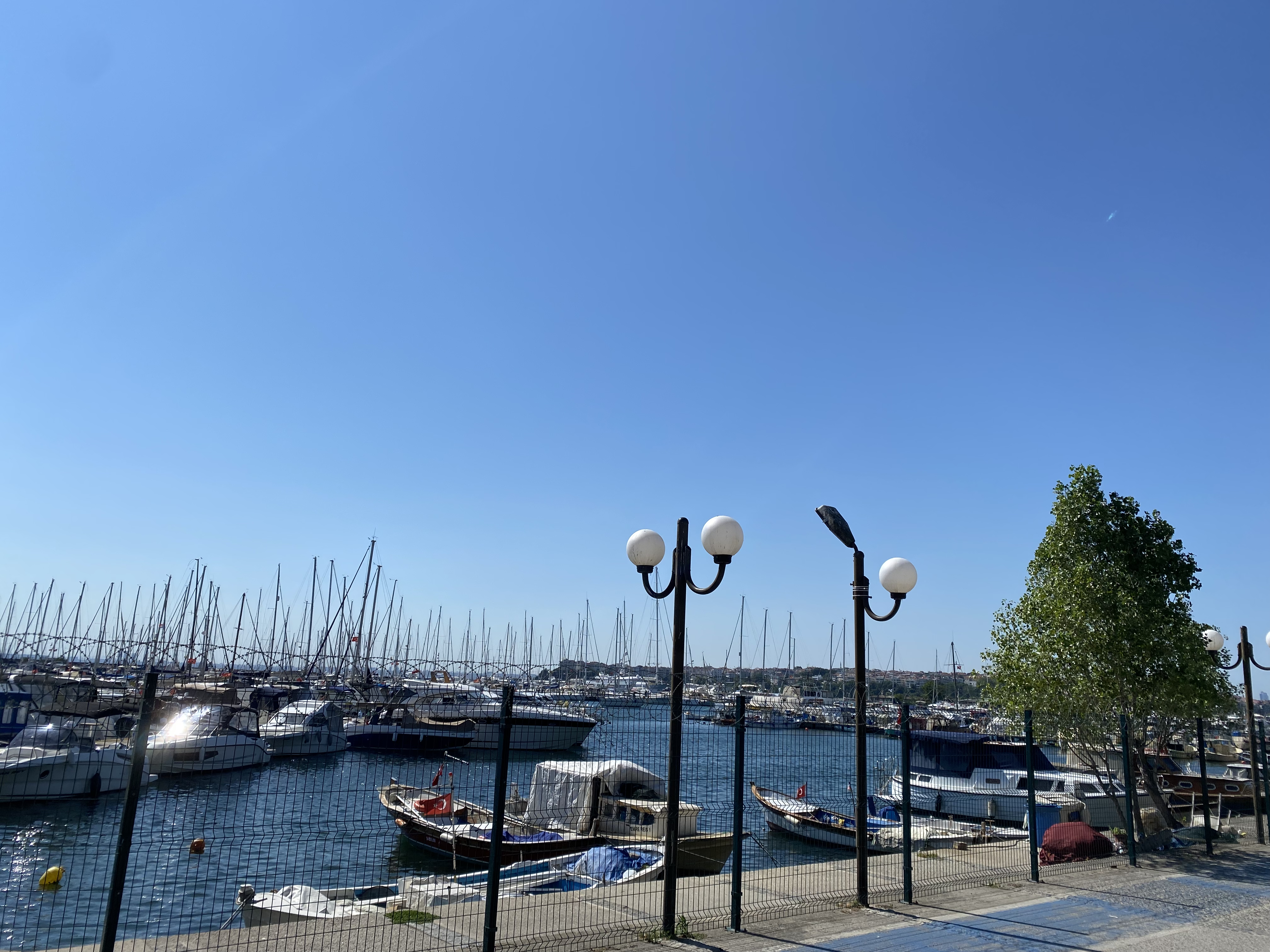
Kalamış marina

Kalamış is famous for its lyrics by Behçet Kemal Çağlar and the composition by Münir Nurettin Selçuk.

"Yok başka yerin lütfu ne yazdan, ne de kıştan; Bir tatlı huzur almaya geldik Kalamış'tan"
