= Basil III of Constantinople =

Ecumenical Patriarch of Constantinople from 1925 to 1929

Basil III
- 264th Archbishop of Constantinople, New Rome and Ecumenical Patriarch
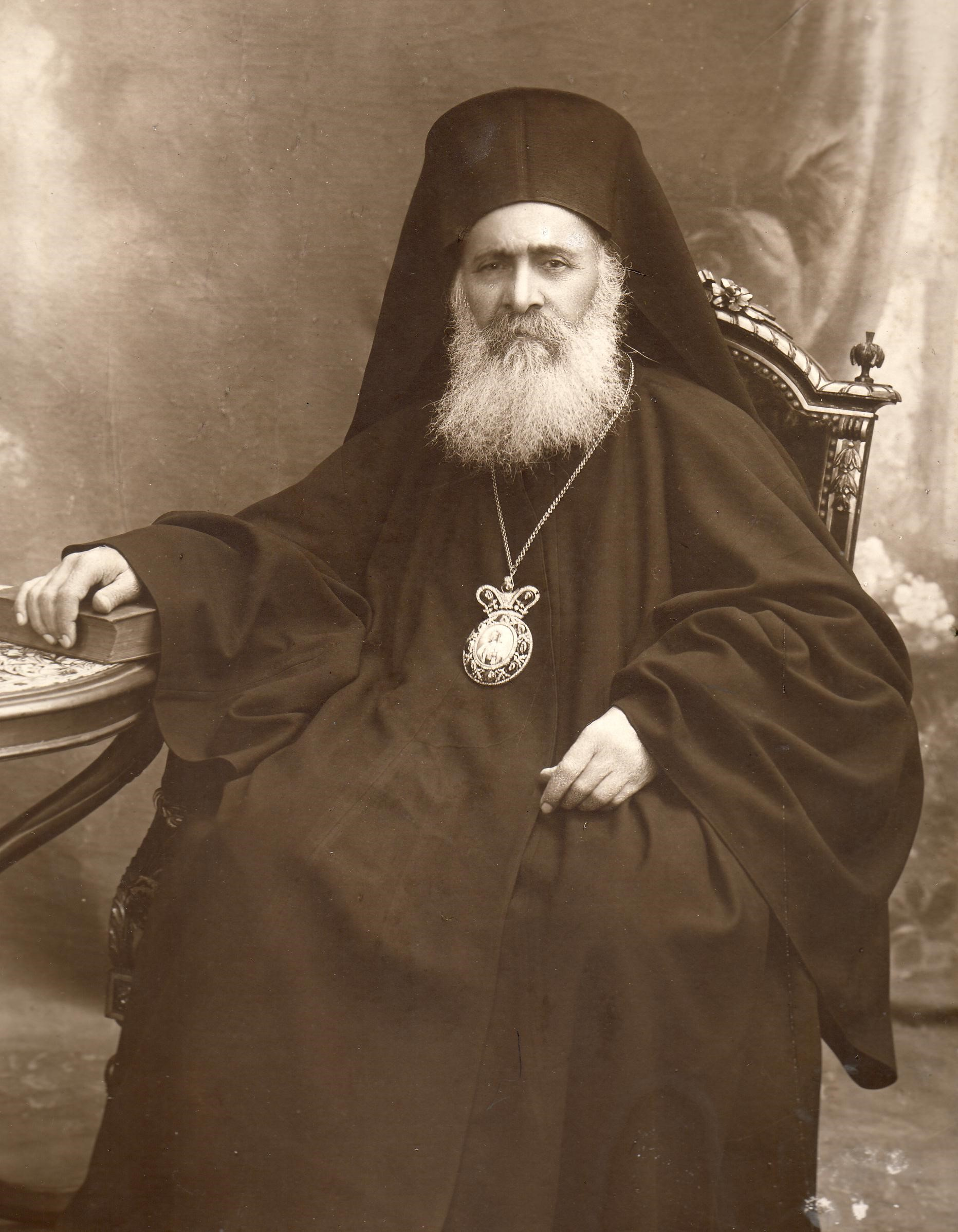
- Church: Ecumenical Patriarchate of Constantinople
- See: Constantinople
- In office: 13 July 1925 – 29 September 1929
- Predecessor: Constantine VI
- Successor: Photius II

Personal details
- Born: Vasileios Georgiadis; 1846 Skutari, Constantinople, Ottoman Empire
- Died: 29 September 1929 (aged 83) Fatih, Constantinople, Turkey
- Denomination: Eastern Orthodoxy

Ecumenical Patriarch Basil III (Greek: Βασίλειος Γʹ; 1846 – 29 September 1929), born Vasileios Georgiadis (Βασίλειος Γεωργιάδης), was Ecumenical Patriarch of Constantinople from July 1925, and serving until his death in September 1929, serving as the primus inter pares (first among equals) and spiritual leader of Easter Orthodox Christianity worldwide.

He studied theology and philology at the University of Athens, and obtained a PhD at the Ludwig-Maximilians-Universität München.

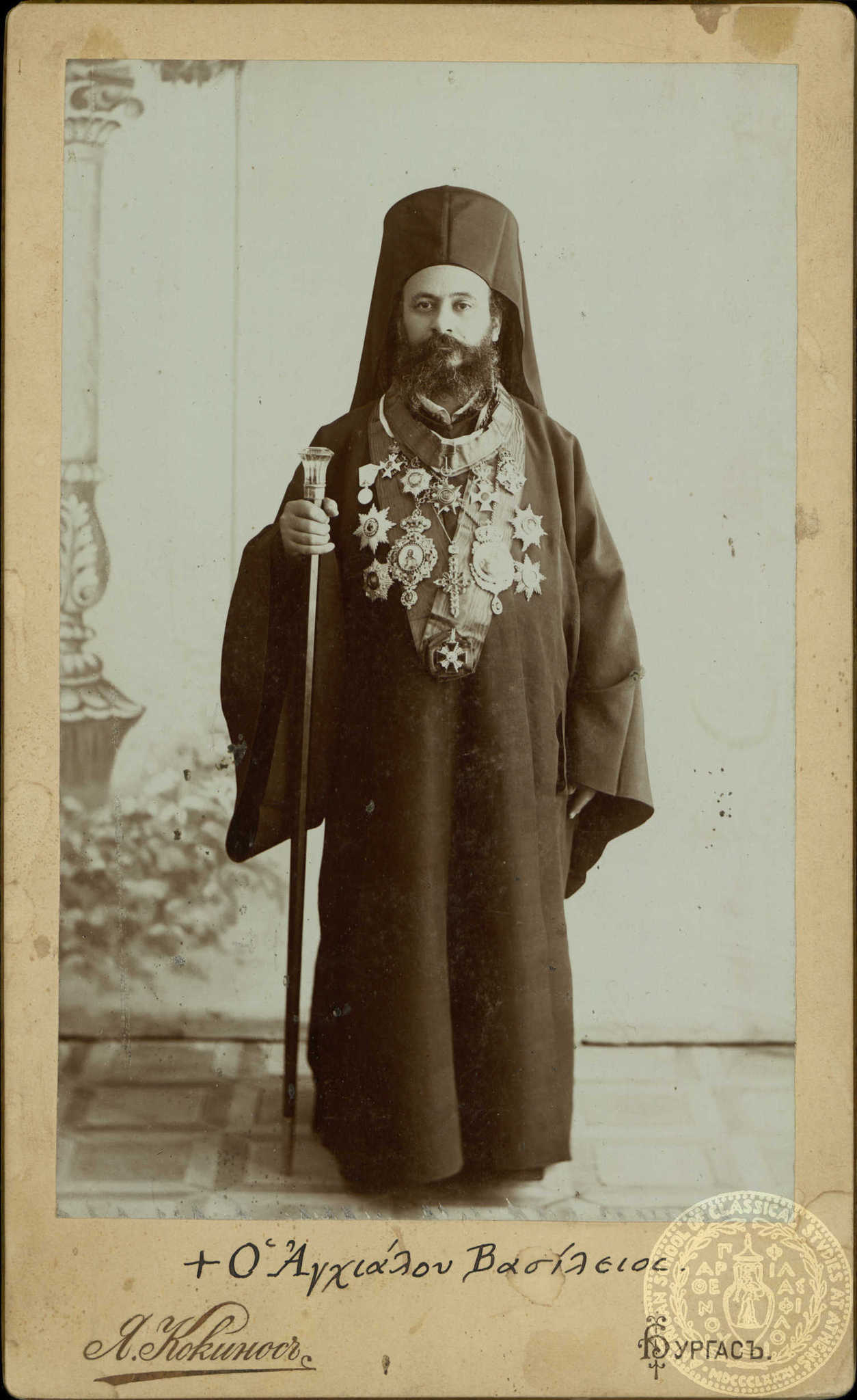
Vasilios of Anchialo, 1909

== Notes and references ==
Eastern Orthodox Church titles
Preceded by Constantine VI	Ecumenical Patriarch of Constantinople; 1925 – 1929	Succeeded by Photius II
