= Constantine VI of Constantinople =

Encumenical Patriarch of Constantinople from 1924 to 1925

Constantine VI
- 263rd Archbishop of Constantinople, New Rome and Ecumenical Patriarch
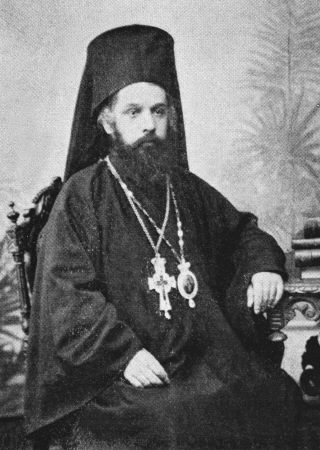
- Patriarch Constantine VI as a bishop, 1906
- Church: Ecumenical Patriarchate of Constantinople
- See: Constantinople
- In office: 17 December 1924 – 22 May 1925
- Predecessor: Gregory VII
- Successor: Basil III

Personal details
- Born: 1859 Syge, near Bursa, Ottoman Empire
- Died: 28 November 1930 (aged 70–71) Nea Filadelfeia, Greece
- Buried: Church of St. Mary of the Spring (Istanbul).
- Denomination: Eastern Orthodoxy

Ecumenical Patriarch Constantine VI (Greek: Κωνσταντῖνος ΣΤʹ; 1859 – 28 November 1930) was Ecumenical Patriarch of Constantinople from 17 December 1924 until his resignation on 22 May 1925, serving as the primus inter pares (first among equals) and spiritual leader of Easter Orthodox Christianity worldwide.

== Biography ==
He was born in 1859 at Syge, near Bursa. After studies at the Theological School of Halki, he became bishop of Rodosto in 1896, metropolitan bishop of Vella and Konitsa in 1899, metropolitan of Trebizond in 1906, of Cyzicus in 1913 and finally of Derkoi in 1922.

Following the death of Ecumenical Patriarch Gregory VII, on 17 November 1924, Constantine served as locum tenens. On 17 December 1924, he was elected Ecumenical Patriarch and enthroned on the same day. Even before his election, the Turkish Government had warned Constantine VI that they considered him one of the Greeks who were eligible for forcible transfer to Greece under the population exchange between Greece and Turkey since he had only moved to Constantinople in 1918. Constantine VI argued that Patriarchate had been expressly exempted from the exchange. Following unsuccessful diplomatic interventions, he was deported by train to Greece on 30 January 1925.

The Greek Government under Prime Minister Andreas Michalakopoulos made strong diplomatic moves on behalf of Constantine VI, but, fearing an escalation of the situation, advised him to retire to Mount Athos. At first, he went to Thessaloniki, where 30,000 people gathered to welcome him. From Thessaloniki, he made unsuccessful appeals to the League of Nations to be allowed to return to Constantinople. Greek military circles led by Theodoros Pangalos asked for a resumption of hostilities with Turkey due to non-compliance with the exchange agreement. The Greek Government attempted to internationalise the issue, requesting the assistance of foreign governments and the former prime minister, Eleftherios Venizelos. Venizelos sided with the Greek Government, but he refused to represent the country on this matter in Geneva, as he disagreed with the action of the Synod of the Patriarchate to insist on Constantine VI's election. On 4 February 1925, the Turkish National Assembly ratified the expulsion and on 11 February 1925, Greece appealed to the League of Nations.

After Turkey agreed not to exile the remaining Greek bishops to Greece, Greece withdrew its appeal to the League of Nations and urged Constantine VI to resign, assuring him that he would be guaranteed a standard of living commensurate with his office. Finally, Constantine VI submitted his resignation on 22 May 1925.

Constantine VI went for some time to Chalcis, as a guest of the Metropolitan of Chalcis. Finally, he settled permanently in Nea Filadelfeia (a suburb or Athens), in a house granted to him by the Greek government. He died on 28 November 1930 and was buried in the First Cemetery of Athens. In 2011 his remains were transferred to Istanbul, and on 6 March 2011 they were buried near the tombs of the Patriarchs in the Church of St. Mary of the Spring.

== Notes and references ==
Eastern Orthodox Church titles
Preceded by Gregory VII	Ecumenical Patriarch of Constantinople; 1924 – 1925	Succeeded by Basil III
