= Fenerbahçe Lighthouse =

Lighthouse in Turkey

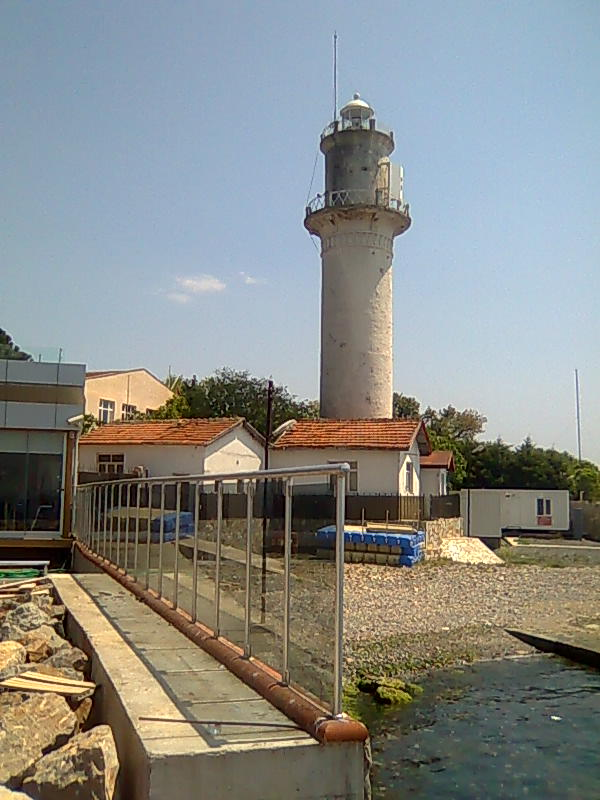
- Fenerbahçe Lighthouse with keeper's house in front
- Location: Fenerbahçe; Kadıköy; Istanbul; Turkey
- Coordinates: 40°58′05.2″N 29°01′55.4″E

Tower
- Constructed: 1856
- Construction: masonry tower
- Height: 20 m (66 ft)
- Shape: cylindrical tower with double balcony and lantern
- Markings: white tower and lantern
- Operator: Directorate General of Coastal Safety
- Fog signal: blast every 60 seconds

Light
- Focal height: 25 m (82 ft)
- Lens: 500 mm (20 in) cylindrical
- Intensity: 1,000 W
- Range: 15 nmi (28 km)
- Characteristic: LFl (2) W 12s.

The Fenerbahçe Lighthouse (Turkish: Fenerbahçe Feneri), a historical lighthouse still in use, is located on the northern coast of Sea of Marmara at Fenerbahçe neighborhood of Kadıköy district in Istanbul, Turkey.

== History ==
Historical documents mention that the location of the cape caused often maritime damage. In 1562, Sultan Suleiman the Magnificent (reigned 1520–1566) issued a decree, in which he ordered the establishment of a light on the rocks at Kalamış Cape, as the location was called that time.

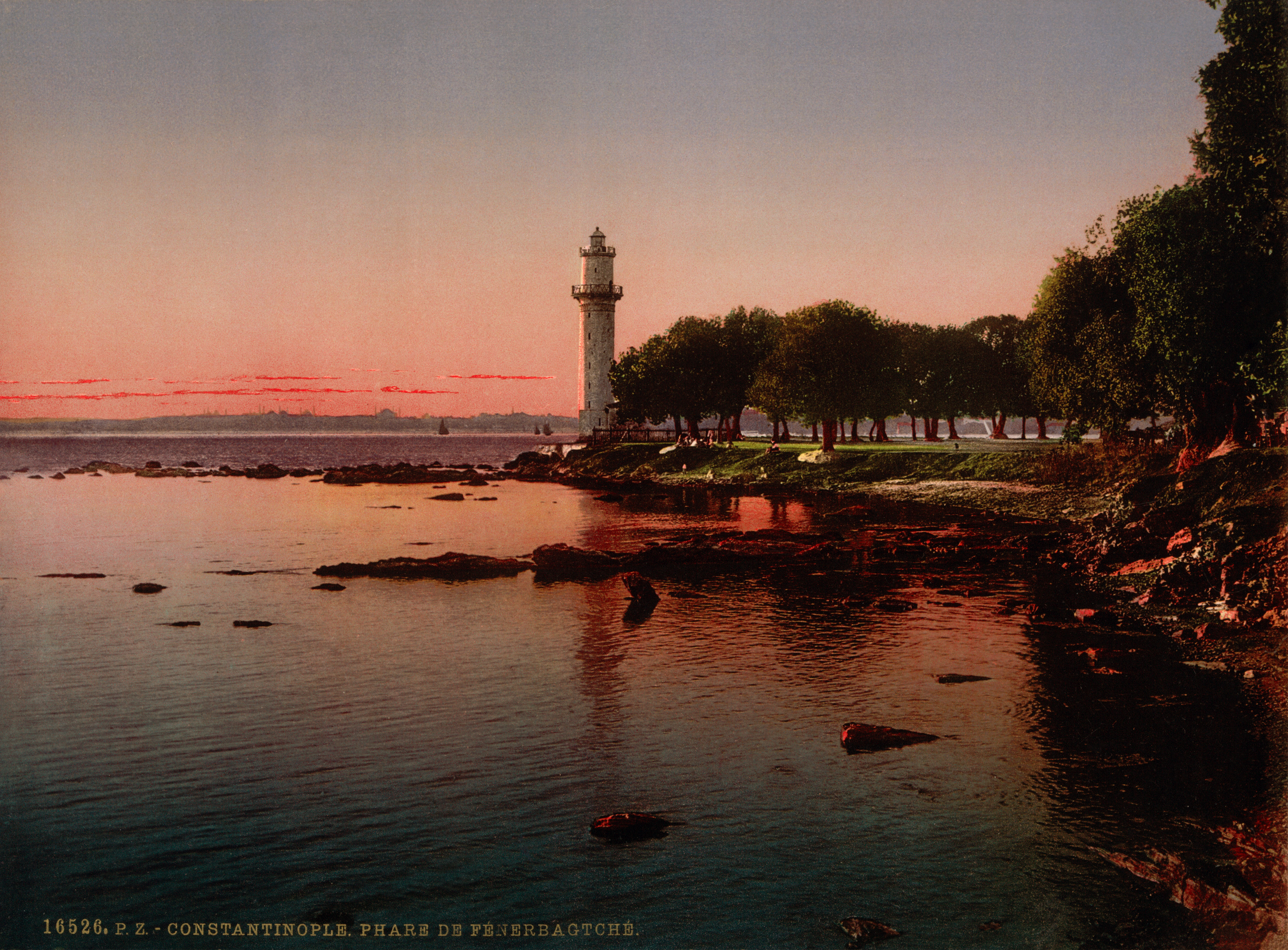
The lighthouse in the late 1800s

Built in 1857, the lighthouse stands on a point at Cape Fenerbahçe close to the eastern side of the Bosporus entrance. The location Fenerbahçe was named after the lighthouse (literally: "Fener" for lighthouse and "bahçe" for garden). It is situated about 1.5 km (0.93 mi) south of Kadıköy in a public park. The 20-metre-high (66 ft) tower with a cylindrical form has two galleries. The lighthouse is painted white. A masonry one-story keeper's house is attached to it.

The lighthouse was initially lit by kerosene, however the light source was later replaced by Dalén light using carbide (acetylene gas). Currently, it runs on electricity. The lighthouse's lantern has a 1,000 W light source. The light flashes twice in group white through a catadioptric reflector system with cylindrical lens having a focus length of 500 mm (20 in) every 12 seconds 1.5 seconds long, which is visible at a range of 15 mi (24 km). The lighthouse's foghorn blasts every 60 seconds in foggy conditions.

Fenerbahçe lighthouse is listed in Turkey under the code "TUR-021" and its radio call sign is TC2FLH. It is operated and maintained by the Coastal Safety Authority (Turkish: Kıyı Emniyeti Genel Müdürlüğü) of the Ministry of Transport and Communication.

The lighthouse and the keeper's house are under protection as a national heritage site. The site is open to the public, however the tower is closed.

== See also ==
- List of lighthouses in Turkey
