= Central Committee of the Northern Epirote Struggle =

Greek separatist group in Albania (1943–1958)

- Κεντρική Επιτροπή Βορειοηπειρωτικού Αγώνα
- Flag of the Autonomous Republic of Northern Epirus
- Leaders: Panteleimon Kotokos (until 1969); Stefanos Venakidhis; Nikolaos Pagos; Serafeimi-Visarion Tika
- Founded: 1943 (during the German occupation of Greece)
- Dates active: World War II–era (during the German occupation of Greece; 1943; Cold War–era; 1948–1958
- Ideology: Greek nationalism Anti-Albanian sentiment Anti–Hoxhaism
- Size: 7,300

The Central Committee of the Northern Epirote Struggle (Greek: Κεντρική Επιτροπή Βορειοηπειρωτικού Αγώνα, romanized: Kentriki Epitropi Voreioepirotikou Agonos, KEVA), was a resistance faction composed of ethnic Greeks whose goal was to overthrow the regime of Enver Hoxha and seek the annexation of the Northern Epirus, which is located in southern Albania.

KEVA was established during the World War II where Greece was still occupied by the Axis powers but played its role during the Cold War when the United States and its intelligence agency attempted to contain the influence of communism in the region. The organization conducted various activities, including gathering information, providing support, and coordinating agent groups in Albania.

== Leadership and membership ==
The organization was led by various individuals, including Stefanos Venakidhis, who also served as the secretary of KEVA and worked for the National Bank of Greece, and Nikolaos Pagos, a doctor and deputy chairman of KEVA. The president of this faction is Archbishop of Greece Seraphim, a former ally of Napoleon Zervas and member of the resistance group ELAS. The organization had a significant number of members in Greece and Southern Albania. They had a strength of about 7,300 ethnic Greek men.

=== Representatives of the Committee in Albania ===
- Sophocles Kalemis
- Theodore Priftis
- Alekos Eleftheriou
- Serran Menjoli
- Islami Bako
- Nikolaos Papagiannis
- Vassilios Kitas
- Rakipi Mourto
- Refat Zache
- Izet Kani
- Andreas Hajdis
- Lambros Eliades
- loannis Skouras
- Pavlos Pavlou
- Demetrios Vassis
- Michael Gionnis
- Charalambos Papavassiliou
- Selim Huri
- Fanis Goulouas
- Demetrios Tsoukas
- Pavlos Vassou
- Nejip Ozmani
- Etem Blatchia
- Michael Dokos
- Loannis Spongos
- Fillipos Liaskos
- Gregorios Ghikas
