= Halki seminary =

Closed school of Eastern Orthodox theology in Heybeliada, Turkey

Coordinates: 40°52′56″N 29°05′42″E

Theological School of Halki
- Θεολογική Σχολή Χάλκης
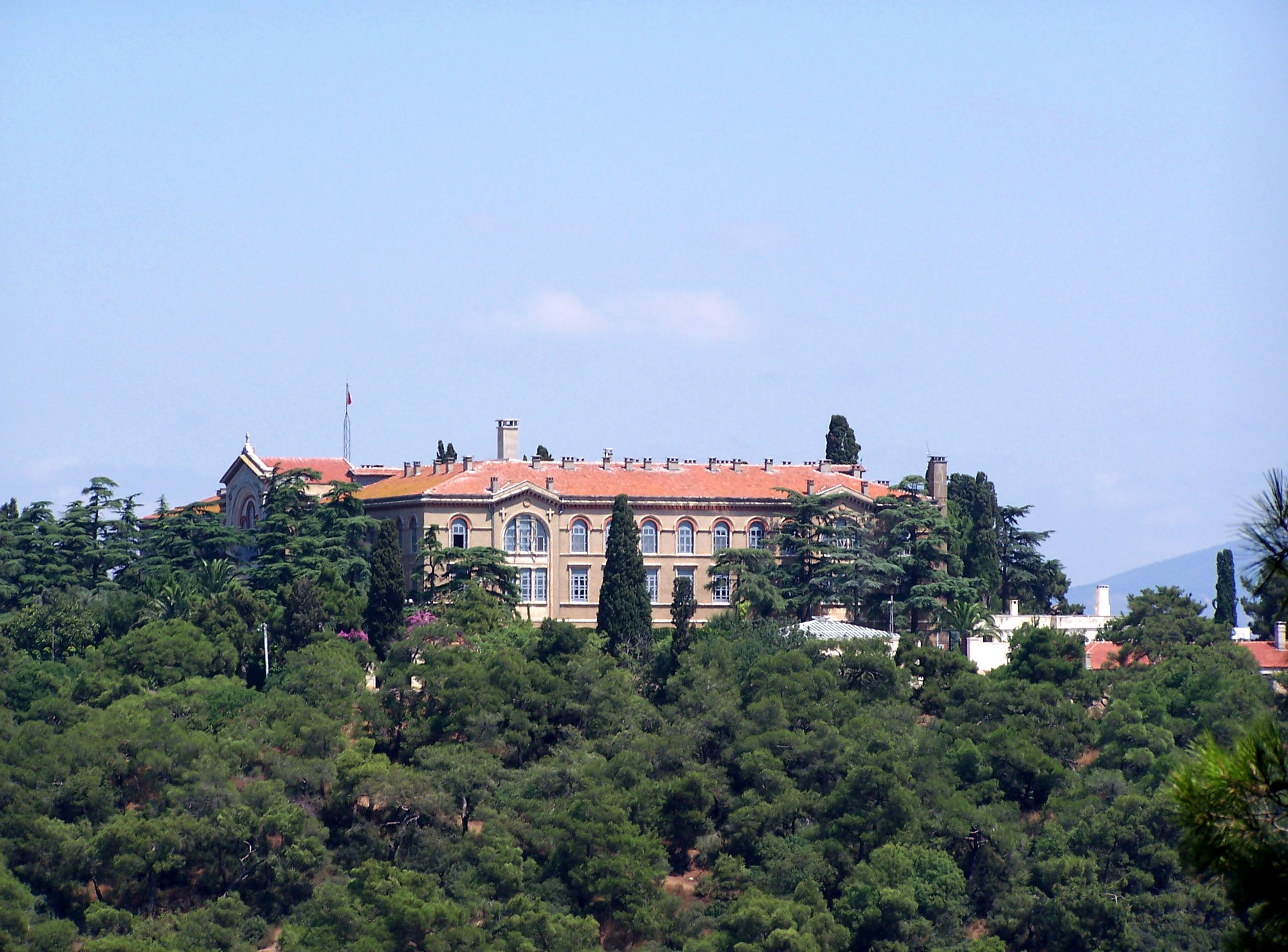
- The Theological School of Halki at the top of the Hill of Hope (2009)
- Type: Theological school
- Active: 1 October 1844–1971 (Hiatus)
- Religious affiliation: Ecumenical Patriarchate of Constantinople

The Halki seminary, formally the Theological School of Halki (Greek: Θεολογική Σχολή Χάλκης and Turkish: Ortodoks Ruhban Okulu), was founded on 1 October 1844 on the island of Halki (Turkish: Heybeliada), the second-largest of the Princes' Islands in the Sea of Marmara. It was the main school of theology of the Eastern Orthodox Church's Ecumenical Patriarchate of Constantinople until the Turkish parliament enacted a law banning private higher education institutions in 1971. The theological school is located at the top of the island's Hill of Hope, on the site of the Byzantine-era Monastery of the Holy Trinity. The premises of the school continue to be maintained by the monastery and are used to host conferences. It is possible to visit the island where it is located via boat in approximately one hour from the shore of Istanbul. An international campaign for the reopening of this theological school had been underway for decades. During his official visit to Athens in May 2026, Patriarch Bartholomew stated that negotiations with the Turkish authorities had concluded successfully and that the restored seminary would reopen in September.

== History ==
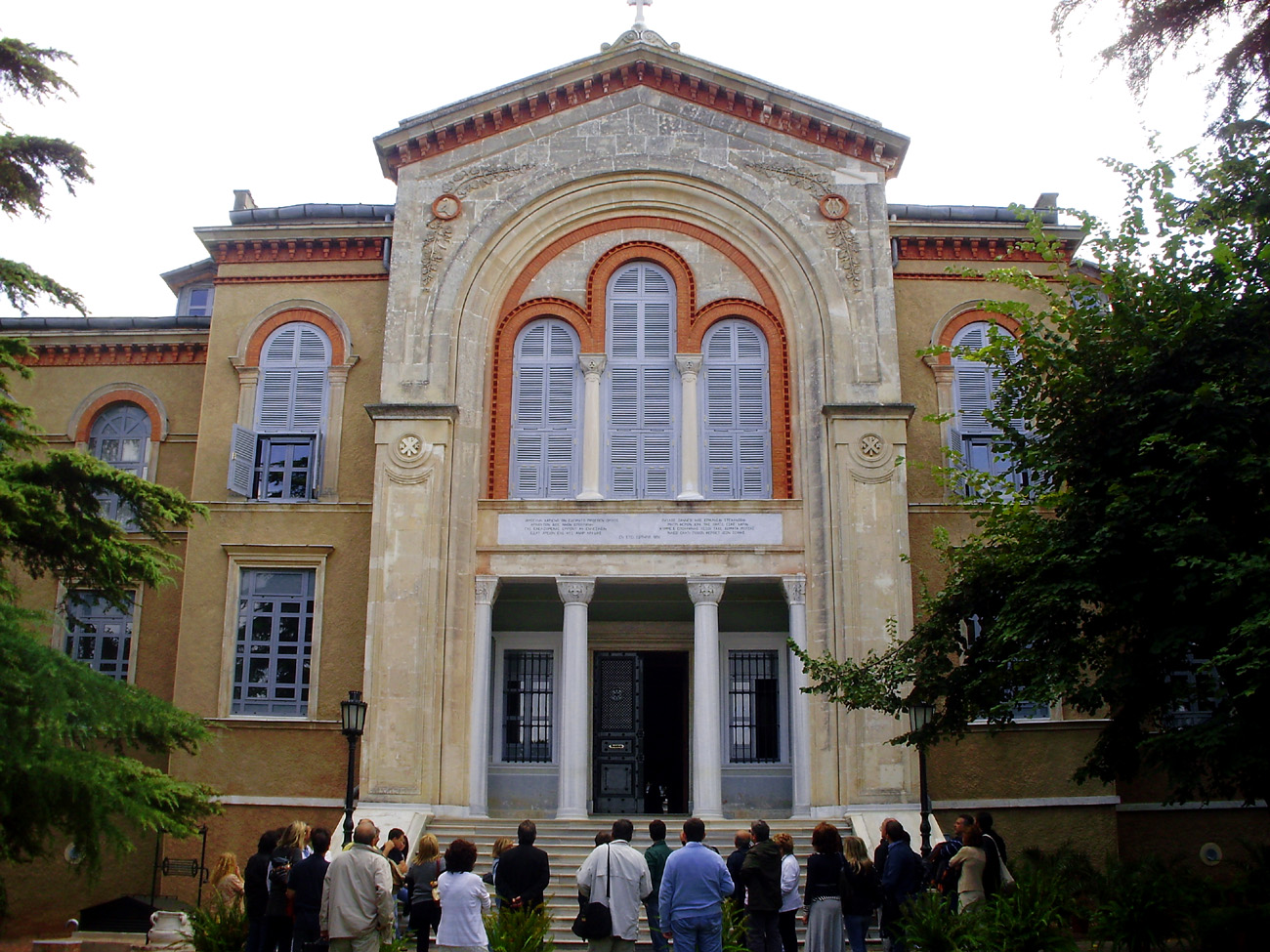
Front view of the Theological school of Halki

The seminary is located on the site of the Monastery of the Holy Trinity, founded by Patriarch Photius I almost a thousand years before the foundation of the theological school. During Ottoman rule the monastery fell into disrepair. In 1844, Patriarch Germanos IV converted the monastery into a school of theology, which was inaugurated on 1 October 1844. All the buildings, except for the 17th-century chapel, were destroyed by the 1894 Istanbul earthquake, but were rebuilt by architect Periklis Fotiadis and inaugurated on 6 October 1896. These buildings were also renovated in the 1950s.

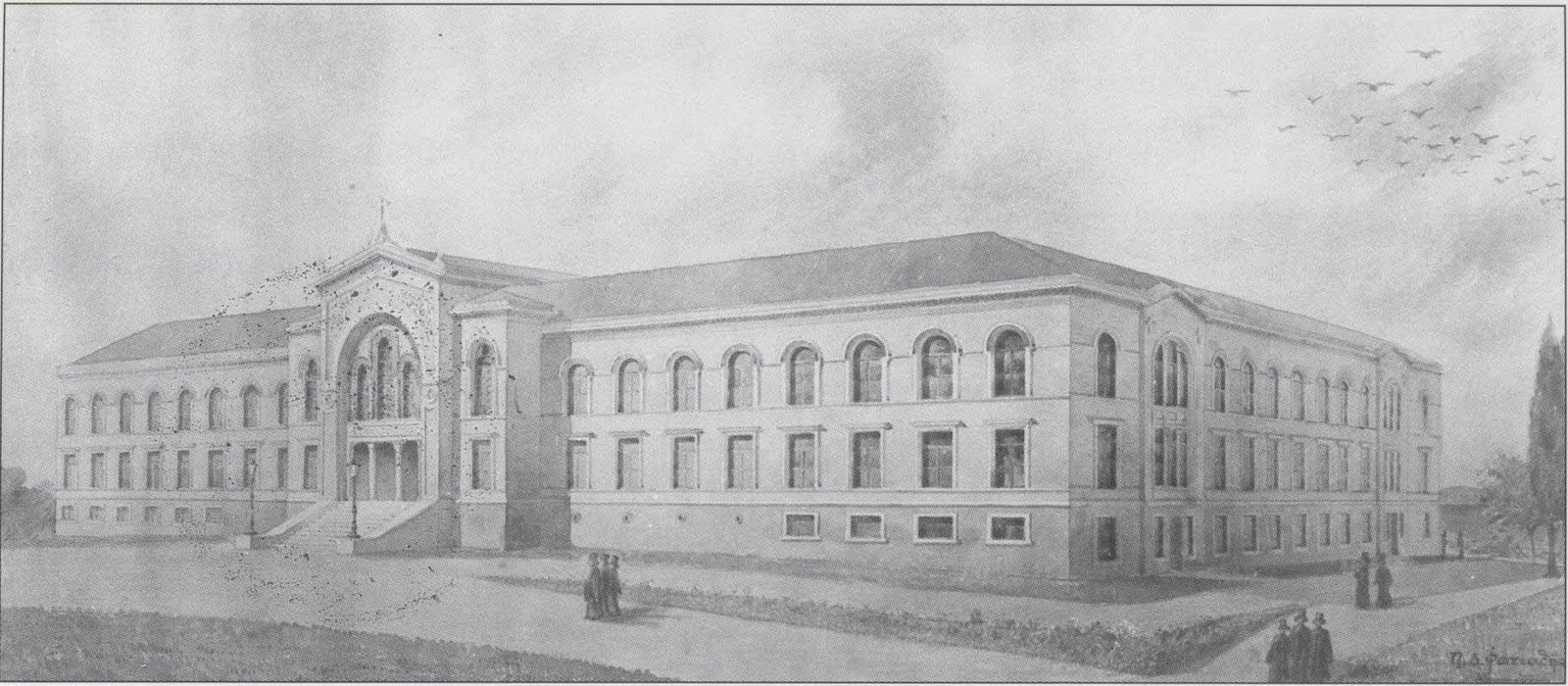
Building of theological school on the hill of Hope. Drawing, end of XIX century.

When established in 1844, the school had seven grades, four high school level and three higher level (theological grades). In 1899, the high school division was dissolved and the school functioned as an academy with five grades. In 1923, on the establishment of the Turkish Republic, the seven-grade system was restored (4 high school + 3 higher level). In 1951, it was changed to 3 high school + 4 higher level.

The facilities include the Chapel of the Holy Trinity, sports and recreational institutions, dormitories, an infirmary, a hospice, offices, and the school's library with its historic collection of books, journals, and manuscripts. The library contains over 120,000 books.

There have been 990 graduates of the theological school and many have become priests, bishops, archbishops, scholars, and patriarchs. Many former students are buried in the grounds of the school. Orthodox Christians from around the world have attended and graduated from the theological school and the alumni are distributed around the world.

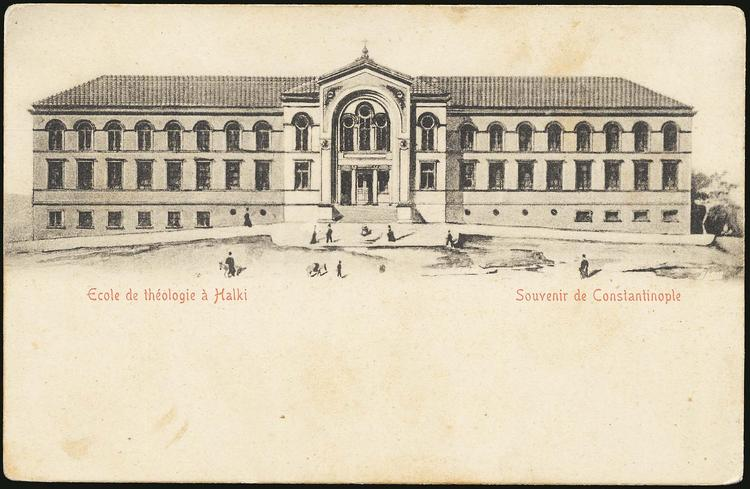
Halki Theological School Ottoman Postcard

== Enforced closure ==
In 1971, parts of the Private University Law were ruled unconstitutional by the Constitutional Court of Turkey, which ruled that all private colleges must be affiliated with a state-run university; subsequently all private institutions of higher education either became part of state universities or closed down. It was stated in Article 130 of the Turkish Constitution of 1961 that:

Foundations are allowed to establish nonprofit colleges that are under state supervision and inspections.

However, Article 132 stated that:

Only the Turkish Armed Forces and police are allowed to open private colleges.

The seminary section of the Halki school was closed down and although the high school remains open, the Turkish government no longer permits students to attend it. The school is currently only used for conferences, including the International Environmental Symposium.

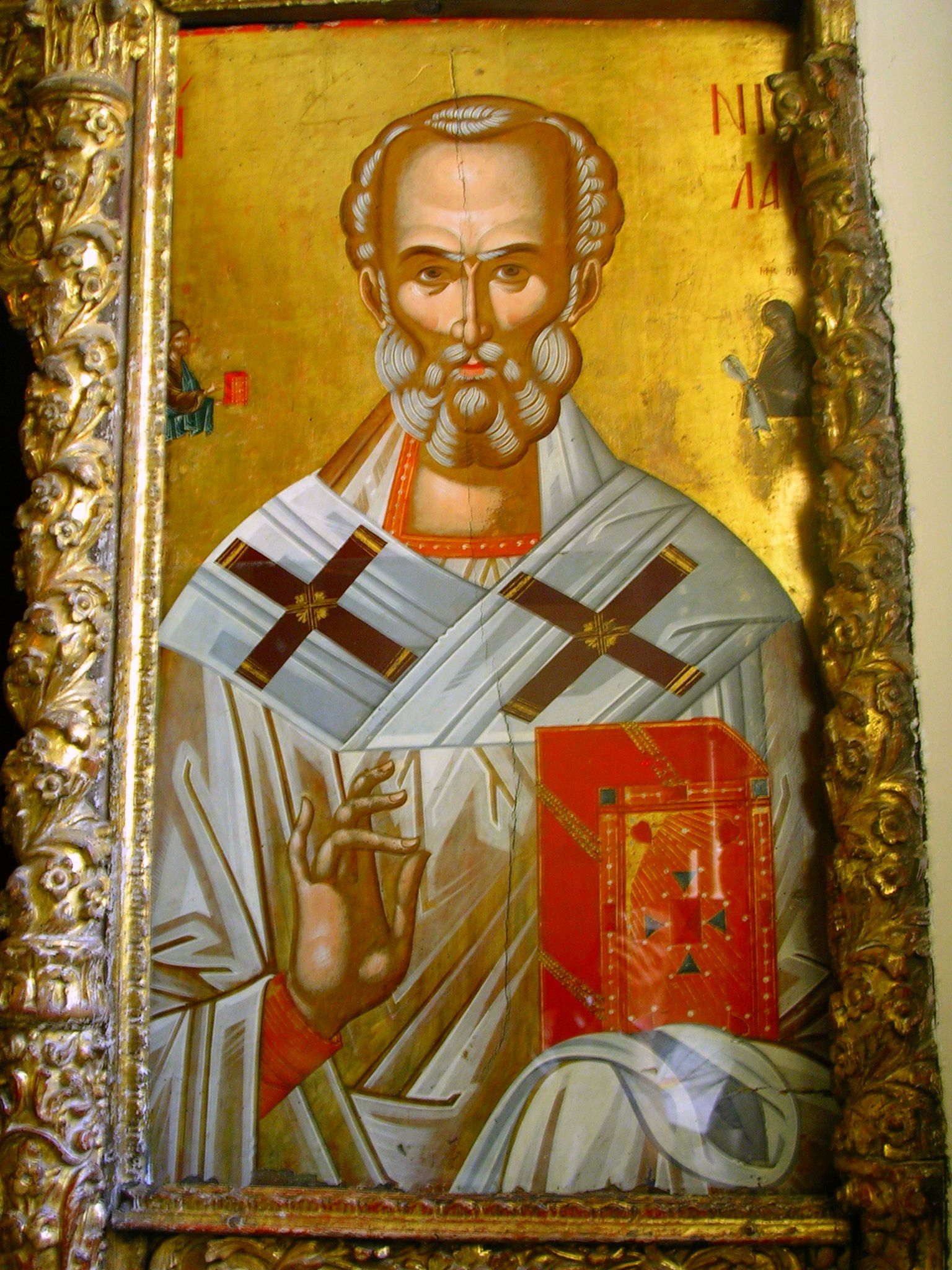
Saint Nicholas icon, Holy Trinity Church, Halki seminary.

On 2 November 1998, Halki's Board of Trustees were ordered to disband by an agency of the Turkish government. International criticism caused the order to be rescinded on 25 November 1998.

== Risks to the seminary ==
In November 2007, the 17th-century Chapel of Our Lord's Transfiguration at the Halki seminary, which had survived the June 1894 earthquake, was almost totally demolished by Forest Guards of the Turkish forestry authority. There was no advance warning given for the demolition work, organised by the Turkish government, and it was only stopped after appeals by the Ecumenical Patriarch.

== Campaign to reopen the seminary ==
The Halki seminary has received international attention in recent years. In October 1998, both houses of the United States Congress passed resolutions that supported the reopening of Halki. The European Union has also raised the issue as part of its negotiations over Turkish accession to the EU. US President Bill Clinton visited Halki on his visit to Turkey in 1999 and urged Turkish President Süleyman Demirel to allow the reopening of the school.

In a speech before the Turkish Parliament on 6 April 2009, US President Barack Obama re-affirmed the need for Turkey to allow the re-opening of the Halki seminary:

Freedom of religion and expression lead to a strong and vibrant civil society that only strengthens the state, which is why steps like reopening the Halki Seminary will send such an important signal inside Turkey and beyond. An enduring commitment to the rule of law is the only way to achieve the security that comes from justice for all people."

These sentiments were echoed by US Secretary of State Hillary Clinton at a dinner in Washington honoring their guest, Ecumenical Patriarch Bartholomew I.

Commentators have noted that while the Turkish government may outwardly seem willing to reopen the seminary, actual moves to do so are not underway because of internal political obstacles. Arrangements for reopening necessitate constitutional amendments, which may be used as a tool by opposition parties to fuel nationalist rhetoric.

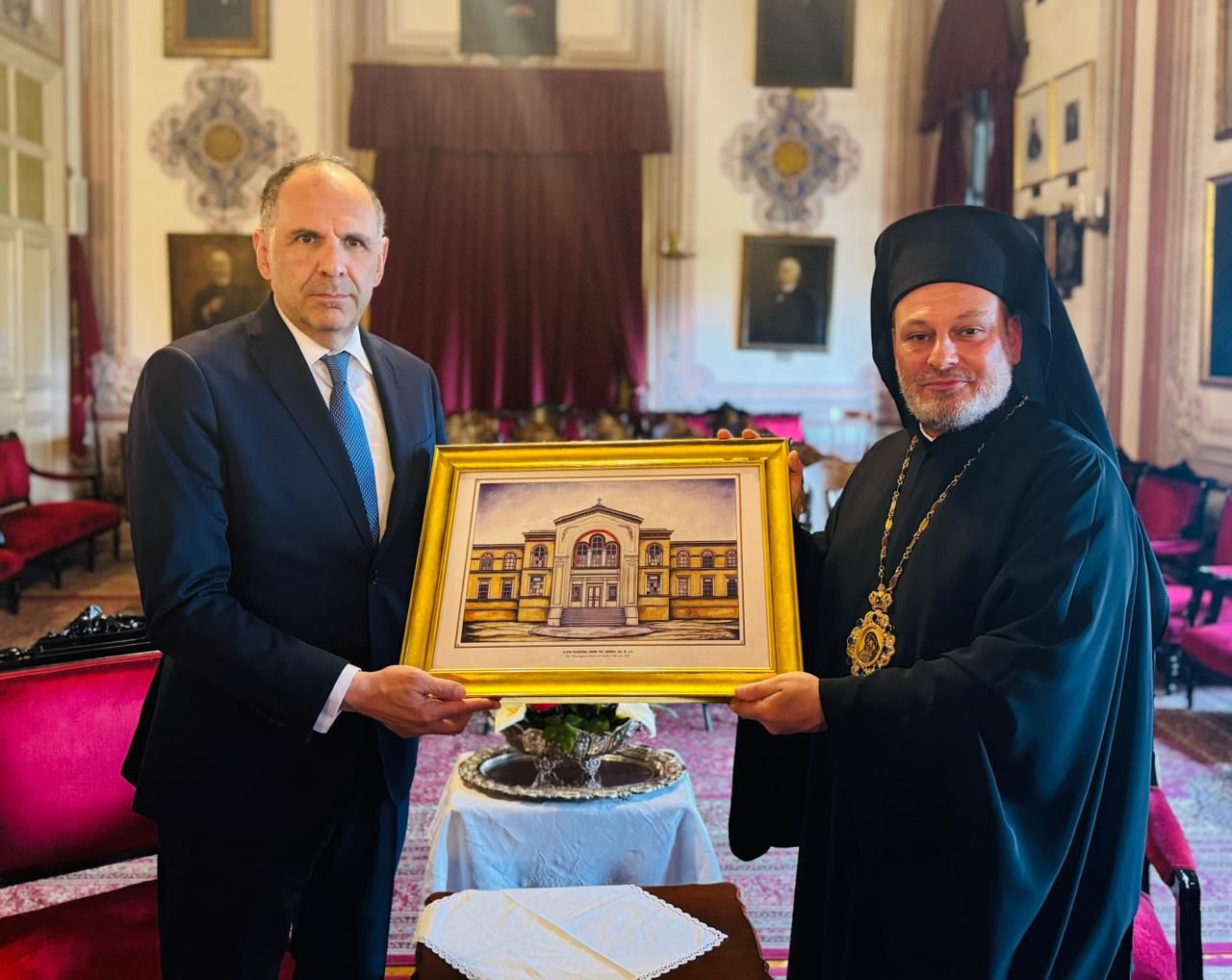
Visit of Foreign Minister George Gerapetritis to the Theological School of Halki and meeting with His Eminence Bishop of Aravissos, Mr. Kassianos (Halki, 01.05.2025)

In 2010, a journalist of the Turkish newspaper Today's Zaman asked officials at the Ecumenical Patriarchate if there were any plans to take the issue to the European Court of Human Rights. Patriarchate officials responded that they did not want to pursue that course of action. However, Patriarch Bartholomew has indicated that they may well have to if there is no progress towards the re-opening of the theological school.

In March 2012, a meeting occurred in South Korea between Prime Minister Erdoğan of Turkey, and President Barack Obama of the United States. In this meeting, Prime Minister Erdoğan indicated to President Obama that Halki Seminary would be reopened as part of Turkey's efforts to protect religious minorities.

In January 2013, the Turkish newspaper Today's Zaman published news that the Council of Foundations returned 190 hectares (470 acres) to the Aya Triada Monastery Foundation, which is the owner of Halki Seminary. At the time, this was the largest return of immovable property to a minority within the Turkish nation. Most of the property which was returned included forested land around the seminary.

After a meeting with Erdoğan and foreign minister Mevlüt Çavuşoğlu on 25 April 2018, Patriarch Bartholomew said that he was "optimistic" after both Erdogan and Cavusoglu "assured him that the School would soon reopen". In February 2019, for the first time, Greek Prime Minister Alexis Tsipras visited Halki during his visit to Turkey and urged Erdoğan to allow the reopening of the school. Tsipras also suggested the next time they should visit the Halki seminary together.

In a visit to the seminary on 28 May 2024, Turkish Minister of National Education Yusuf Tekin stated that said that efforts are underway to reopen the school.

President Donald Trump held talks with Turkish President Recep Tayyip Erdogan at the White House on 25 September 2025, where the reopening of the school was mentioned. Erdogan stated "We are ready to do whatever we can that falls on our part and when I get back, I will try to discuss this issue with the esteemed Mr. Bartholomew."

== Alumni ==
In the history of the theological school there have been 990 graduates in total. The alumni include:

- Saint Chrysostomos of Smyrna
- Saint Raphael of Brooklyn
- Anthim I of Bulgaria
- Ecumenical Patriarch Bartholomew I of Constantinople
- Ecumenical Patriarch Demetrios I of Constantinople
- Ecumenical Patriarch Athenagoras I of Constantinople
- Ecumenical Patriarch Constantine VI of Constantinople
- Ecumenical Patriarch Germanus V of Constantinople
- Ecumenical Patriarch Maximus V of Constantinople
- Patriarch Parthenius III of Alexandria
- Archbishop Chrysanthus of Athens
- Archbishop Spyridon of Athens
- Archbishop Spyridon of America
- Archbishop Michael of America
- Archbishop Iakovos of America
- Archbishop Stylianos of Australia and Exarch of Oceania
- Metropolitan Cornelius of Petra
- Metropolitan Christoforos Knitis
- Archbishop Makarios II
- Bishop Ioakeim Martianos
- Metropolitan Meliton of Chalcedon
- Metropolitan Nikiforos of Didymoteicho, Orestiada and Soufli
- Metropolitan Panteleimon of Belgium
- Metropolitan Theophylactos Papathanasopoulos
- Metropolitan Loukas (Petridis)
- Bishop Panteleimon Kotokos

== See also ==
- Christianity in Turkey
- Byzantine philosophy
- Essence–Energies distinction (Eastern Orthodox theology)
- Philotheos Bryennios
