= Nikiforos of Didymoteicho =

Nikiforos (born Athanasios Archangelidis; 1931 – 4 October 2009) was the metropolitan bishop of Didymoteicho, Orestiada and Soufli from 1988 until his death. A graduate of the Halki Seminary School and the Aristotle University of Thessaloniki, Nikiforos was ordained a deacon in 1956 and a senior priest in 1961.

Nikiforos was investigated in 2005 for alleged sexcapades.
