= Metropolitan Panteleimon of Belgium =

Greek priest (1935–2023)

Metropolitan Panteleimon (Greek: Μητροπολίτης Παντελεήμων, born Nikolaos Kontoyiannis, Greek: Νικόλαος Κοντογιάννης; 7 February 1935 – 24 January 2023) was the Metropolitan of Belgium and Exarch of the Netherlands and Luxembourg, under the spiritual leadership of the Ecumenical Patriarchate of Constantinople. He retired in 2013.

Panteleimon was born in Chios, Greece on 7 February 1935. He was a graduate of the Theological Institute of Halki seminary, Istanbul. In 1982, he was unanimously elected by the Holy Synod of the Ecumenical Patriarchate as the Head of the Holy Greek Orthodox Metropolis of Belgium, based in Brussels.

Metropolitan Panteleimon died on 24 January 2023, at the age of 87.

== Literature ==
- Kiminas, Demetrius (2009). The Ecumenical Patriarchate: A History of Its Metropolitanates with Annotated Hierarch Catalogs. Wildside Press LLC. ISBN 9781434458766.
