= Loukas Petridis =

Ottoman Greek priest (1850–1912)

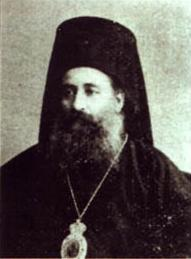
Loukas Petridis in 1905

Loukas Petridis (Greek: Λουκάς Πετρίδης) was an Ottoman Greek priest, monk and Metropolitan bishop of the Ecumenical Patriarchate of Constantinople.

== Biography ==
Petridis was born in 1850 in Madytos, then Ottoman Empire (now Turkey). He became a monk in Karyes of Mount Athos and graduated from the Theological School of Halki in 1878. Then he served as a deacon of the Metropoly of Thessaloniki and later was appointed as a secretary of the ecclesiastical court. In 1886 he was elected Metropolitan of Serres. During his ecclesiastical career he also served as a Metropolitan bishop in Ainos since 1888, Dropull since 1899 and Veria in 1911.

Lastly, he served as a Metropolitan bishop in Philadelphia, where he died on 19 December 1912 at the age of 71 or 72.
