= Panteleimon Kotokos =

Greek bishop

- Bishop of Gjirokastër
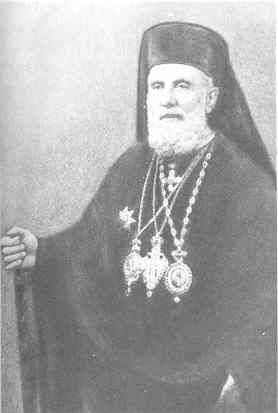
- Church: Orthodox Autocephalous Church of Albania
- In office: 1937–1941

Personal details
- Born: 1890; Korçë, Manastir Vilayet, Ottoman Empire (modern Albania)
- Died: 24 May 1969; Athens, Greece

Panteleimon of Gjirokastër (Greek: Παντελεήμων Αργυροκάστρου, born Christos Kotokos, Greek: Χρήστος Κοτόκος, Albanian: Kristo Kotoko; 1890–1969) was a bishop of the Orthodox Autocephalous Church of Albania. He was the metropolitan bishop of Gjirokastër (1937–1941) and later the President of the exiled Northern Epirus resistance faction KEVA after the end of World War II.

Panteleimon Kotokos was born in Korçë, in the Manastir Vilayet of the Ottoman Empire (present-day southern Albania) in 1860, into a Greek family. After he finished middle level education in his home place he was accepted in the Theological School of Halki, in Istanbul (Constantinople). For several years he worked as a high school theology teacher. He also acquired a degree in law science at the University of Athens.

After an agreement with the Albanian authorities, in 1937, the Ecumenical Patriarchate chose a number of highly educated religious personalities for key position in the recently declared as autocephalous Orthodox Church of Albania. Among them were Panteleimon Kotokos as metropolitan of Gjirokastër and Eulogios Kourilas, as metropolitan of Korçë.

When the communist regime of Enver Hoxha came to power in Albania (1945), he was declared 'enemy of the state' and was expelled from the country. He fled to Greece where together with Eulohios Kourilas became the heads of the Central Committee of the Northern Epirote Struggle (KEVA). On November 18, 1945, he managed to organize a massive demonstration in Athens, where 150,000 people participated. The following years he became active as a member of the exiled Northern Epirus lobby propagating discrimination of the Greek minority by the Communist regime of Albania.
