= Benjamin I of Constantinople =

Ecumenical Patriarch of Constantinople from 1936 to 1946

Benjamin I
- 266th Archbishop of Constantinople, New Rome and Ecumenical Patriarch
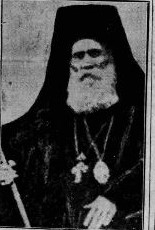
- Patriarch Benjamin I of Constantinople
- Church: Ecumenical Patriarchate of Constantinople
- See: Constantinople
- In office: 18 January 1936 – 17 February 1946
- Predecessor: Photius II
- Successor: Maximus V

Personal details
- Born: Benjamin Psomas; 18 January 1871 Edremit, Ottoman Empire
- Died: 17 February 1946 (aged 75) Istanbul, Turkey
- Denomination: Eastern Orthodoxy

Ecumenical Patriarch Benjamin I (Greek: Βενιαμίν Αʹ, 18 January 1871 – 17 February 1946) was 266th Ecumenical Patriarch of Constantinople from January 1936, until his death to February 1946, serving as the primus inter pares (first among equals) and spiritual leader of Easter Orthodox Christianity worldwide.

== Early life ==
Benjamin was born as Benjamin Psomas on 18 January 1871, in Edremit, Ottoman Empire. From 1889 to 1896, he studied at the Halki seminary.

== Career ==
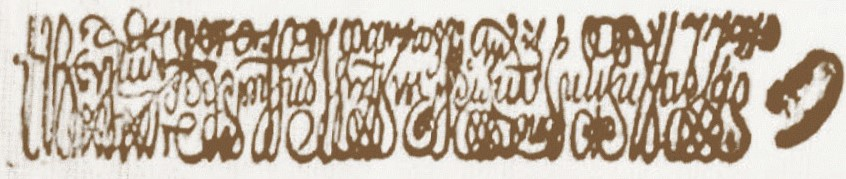
Letterhead: Benjamin by the grace of God Archbishop of Constantinople, New Rome, and Ecumenical Patriarch

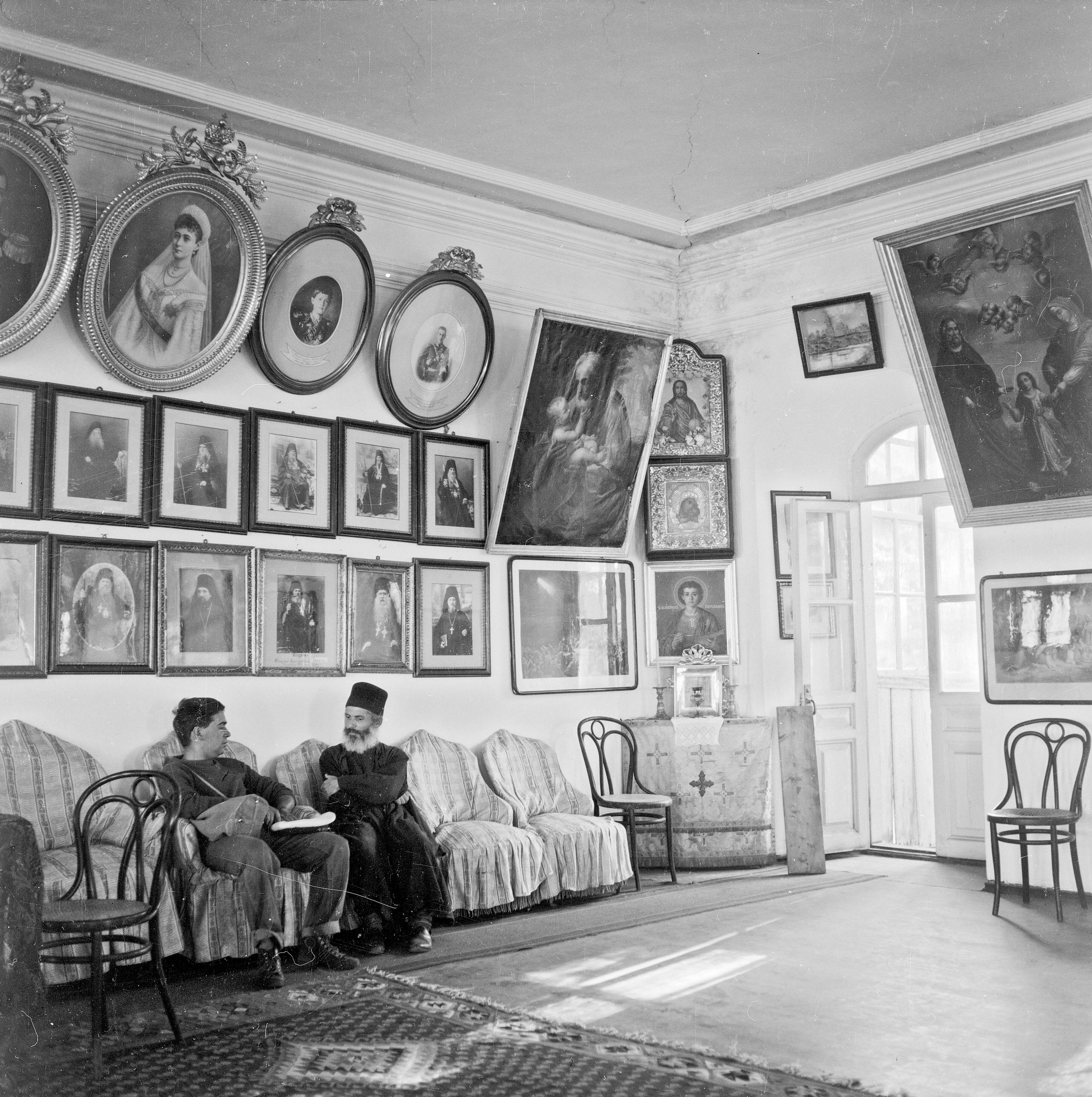
Benjamin I Patriarch of Constantinople being visited by Italian designer Roberto Sambonet in 1945.

In 1912, he was elected as the Metropolis of Rhodes, in 1914, he was elected as the Metropolitan of Silybria, and was later moved to the Metropolis of Philippopolis, but was unable to perform his duties due to the outbreak of World War I.

On 18 January 1936, the Holy Synod voted to elevated Benjamin from Metropolitan bishop to Ecumenical Patriarch of Constantinople following the death of Photius II of Constantinople.

Benjamin I died in Istanbul on 17 February 1946, after suffering from bronchitis and was succeeded by Maximus V of Constantinople. At the 1946 Greek Orthodox Archdiocese of America national convention, two minutes of silence were given in honor of Benjamin I and a delegate from Pope Pius XII attended his funeral.

== Notes and references ==
Eastern Orthodox Church titles
Preceded by Photius II	Ecumenical Patriarch of Constantinople; 1936 – 1946	Succeeded by Maximus V
