= Demetrios I of Constantinople =

Ecumenical Patriarch of Constantinople from 1972 to 1991

Demetrios I
- 269th Archbishop of Constantinople, New Rome and Ecumenical Patriarch
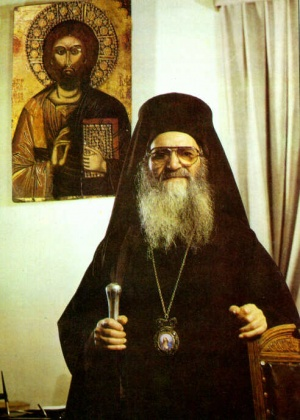
- Church: Ecumenical Patriarchate of Constantinople
- Installed: 16 July 1972
- Term ended: 2 October 1991
- Predecessor: Athenagoras I
- Successor: Bartholomew I

Personal details
- Born: Demetrios Papadopoulos; 8 September 1914 Constantinople, Ottoman Empire
- Died: 2 October 1991 (aged 77) Phanar, Istanbul, Turkey
- Denomination: Eastern Orthodox Church

Patriarch Demetrios I of Constantinople, also Dimitrios I or Demetrius I, born Demetrios Papadopoulos (Greek: Δημήτριος Αʹ, Δημήτριος Παπαδόπουλος; 8 September 1914 – 2 October 1991), was the 269th Ecumenical Patriarch of Constantinople from 16 July 1972, until his death in October 1991, serving as the primus inter pares (first among equals) and spiritual leader of 300 million Eastern Orthodox Christians.

Before his election as patriarch, he served as the metropolitan bishop of Imvros.

He was born in Constantinople, where he also died.

== Role in ecumenism ==
On 30 November 1979, Demetrios I proclaimed the establishment of the official theological dialogue between the Eastern Orthodox Church and the Roman Catholic Church, at that time led by Pope John Paul II. He also met with two archbishops of Canterbury representing the Anglican Communion.

In 1987, Demetrios I travelled to the Vatican where he was received by Pope John Paul II. At a solemn ceremony in St. Peter's Basilica, the patriarchs of East and West together recited the Nicene-Constantinopolitan Creed of the Church in Greek as originally defined in 381 AD, without the controversial Filioque clause. The Pope later recalled the event in his ecumenical encyclical letter Ut Unum Sint.

In an 8-city tour of the United States in 1990, Ecumenical Patriarch Demetrios I met with President George H. W. Bush, with Christian and Jewish leaders, and with public officials, and spread the message that: "Today, Orthodoxy is not a strange or alien factor in America. It is flesh of its flesh and bone of its bone".

== Notes and references ==
Eastern Orthodox Church titles
Preceded by Athenagoras I	Ecumenical Patriarch of Constantinople; 1972 – 1991	Succeeded by Bartholomew I
