= Fenerbahçe, Kadıköy =

Fenerbahçe
- Neighbourhood
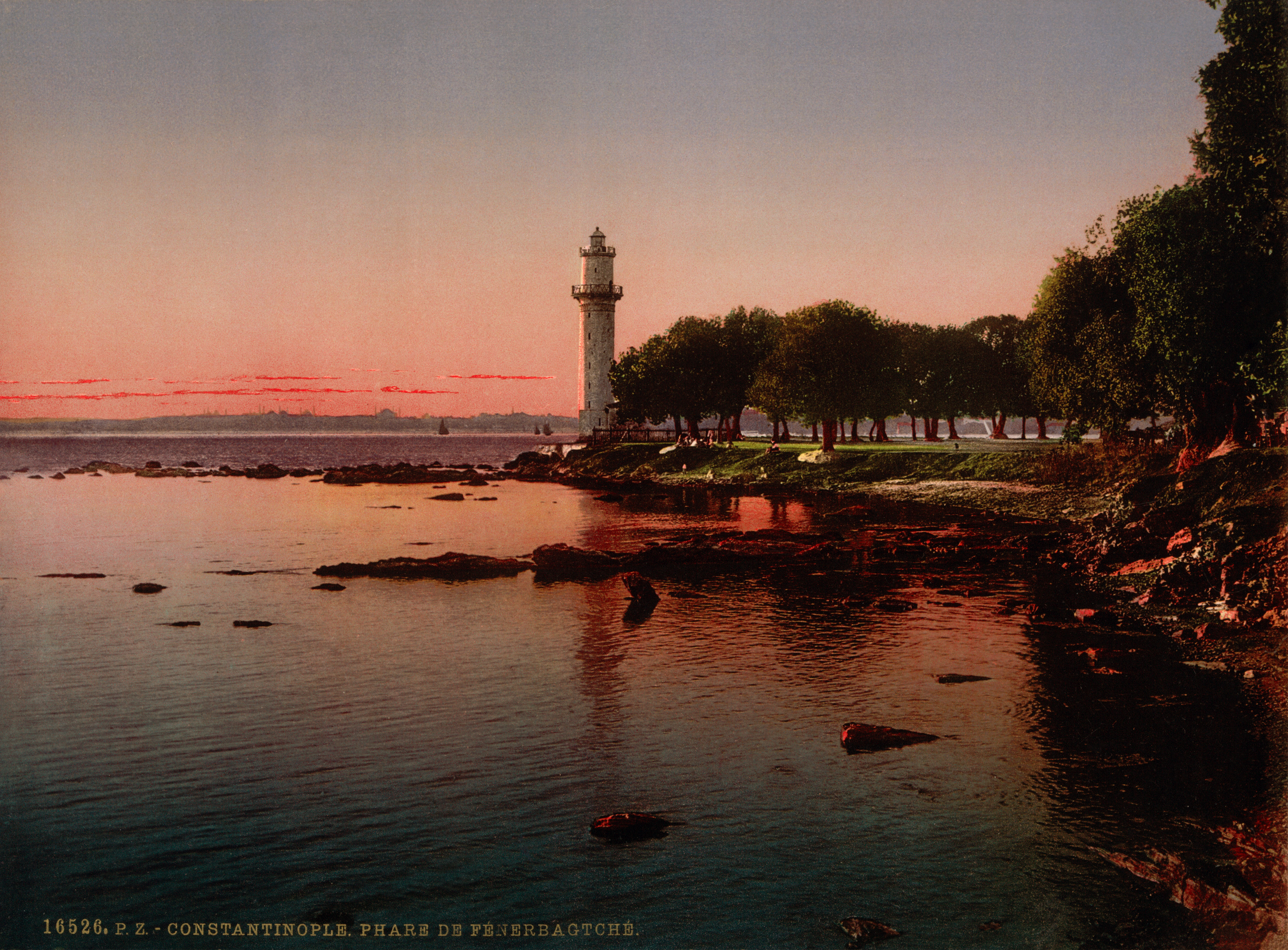
- A view of Fenerbahçe district with the Fenerbahçe Lighthouse, 1898

- Fenerbahçe location in Kadıköy.

- Location within Turkey Location within Istanbul
- Coordinates: 40°58′28″N 29°02′37″E
- Country: Turkey
- Province: Istanbul
- District: Kadıköy
- Population (2022): 21,405
- Time zone: UTC+3 (TRT)
- Postal code: 34726
- Area code: 0216

Fenerbahçe (Turkish pronunciation: [feˈnæɾbahtʃe]) is a neighborhood in the district of Kadıköy, Istanbul Province, Turkey. Fenerbahçe is located on the Asian side of Istanbul on the shore of the Sea of Marmara. It is bordered by Feneryolu and Göztepe in the northeast, Caddebostan in the southeast, and Zühtüpaşa in the northwest. Its population is 21,405 (2022). Turkish football giants Fenerbahçe S.K. takes its name from this area and was first established in this location in 1907.

== Name ==
The name Fenerbahçe means "lighthouse garden" in Turkish (from fener, meaning "lighthouse," and bahçe, meaning "garden"), referring to the historic Fenerbahçe Lighthouse located in Fenerbahçe.

In pre-Byzantine times, the area was known as Hieria (Ίερεία), named for a sanctuary of Hera in the area. (Alternate explanations for the name include "grave" (ήρίον), "air" (άήρ), and "religious ceremony" or "religious festival.")

Stephanus of Byzantium calls the area Euron or Eurion. In the Middle Ages, the area was called Heraion or Hereion. Gyllius calls the area Euron and Cape of Ioannes Kalamote. In early Ottoman times, the area was called Bağçe-i Fener. Patriarch Constantius I wrote that the area's name was Phanaraki, but that Turks called it Fener Baxessi.

== History ==
One of the ports of ancient Chalcedon was in Kalamış. Emperor Justinian I built a palace with a harbor here, porticoes for a forum, a public bath, and churches dedicated to the Virgin Mary, Procopius the Martyr, and a St. Helios the Thesbiste. Emperor Heraclius later also resided here. The Council of Hieria was convened here by Constantine V in 754 to promote the emperor’s iconoclasm. Basil I restored the imperial palace, resided here, and built a chapel dedicated to Elijah. Constantine Porphyrogenitus rebuilt the palace, which remained until at least 1203.

In the 16th century, the Ottomans began building in the area, converting the grounds of the Byzantine palace into an imperial garden, much work being done by the architect Sinan. A small imperial mosque was built during the reign of Selim I. A palace was also built including a main building (kasır), a smaller building, outbuildings, a tower, and a small mosque.

In 1562, Sultan Süleyman gave permission for Kapıağası Yakup Ağa to construct a lighthouse (fânûs) here. Its lamp burned olive oil. In 1849, the tower was rebuilt taller. In 1856, a more modern lighthouse was built. In the 18th century, Fenerbahçe was known as a place of punishment (infaz) and was the port from which those sentenced to exile were sent off. In the mid-19th century, the road connecting the area to Kadıköy narrow and in very poor condition. The main inhabitants were a few Greek and Armenian fishing families.

In the 1870s, the population of the neighborhood was small, consisting mostly of Ottoman minorities and foreigners, and most of the land belonged to four foreign families: the French Jewish Levantine Oppenheim family, the Swiss Levantine Semadeni family, the Swiss-French Levantine Cingria family, and the German Müller family. People in the social circles of these families and later wealthy Levantines, Greeks, and Armenians built houses on these lands.

In 1873, a railway branch line was opened from Feneryolu to Fenerbahçe. Train service continued till 1928. The station building was demolished in 1936.

== Namesakes ==
The neighborhood gave its name to Fenerbahçe S.K., the professional sports club based in the area. The home stadium of the club, Şükrü Saracoğlu Stadium, stands just outside the Fenerbahçe neighborhood.

The Fenerbahçe Education, Culture, and Health Foundation's Fenerbahçe University is located in the Ataşehir district of Istanbul.

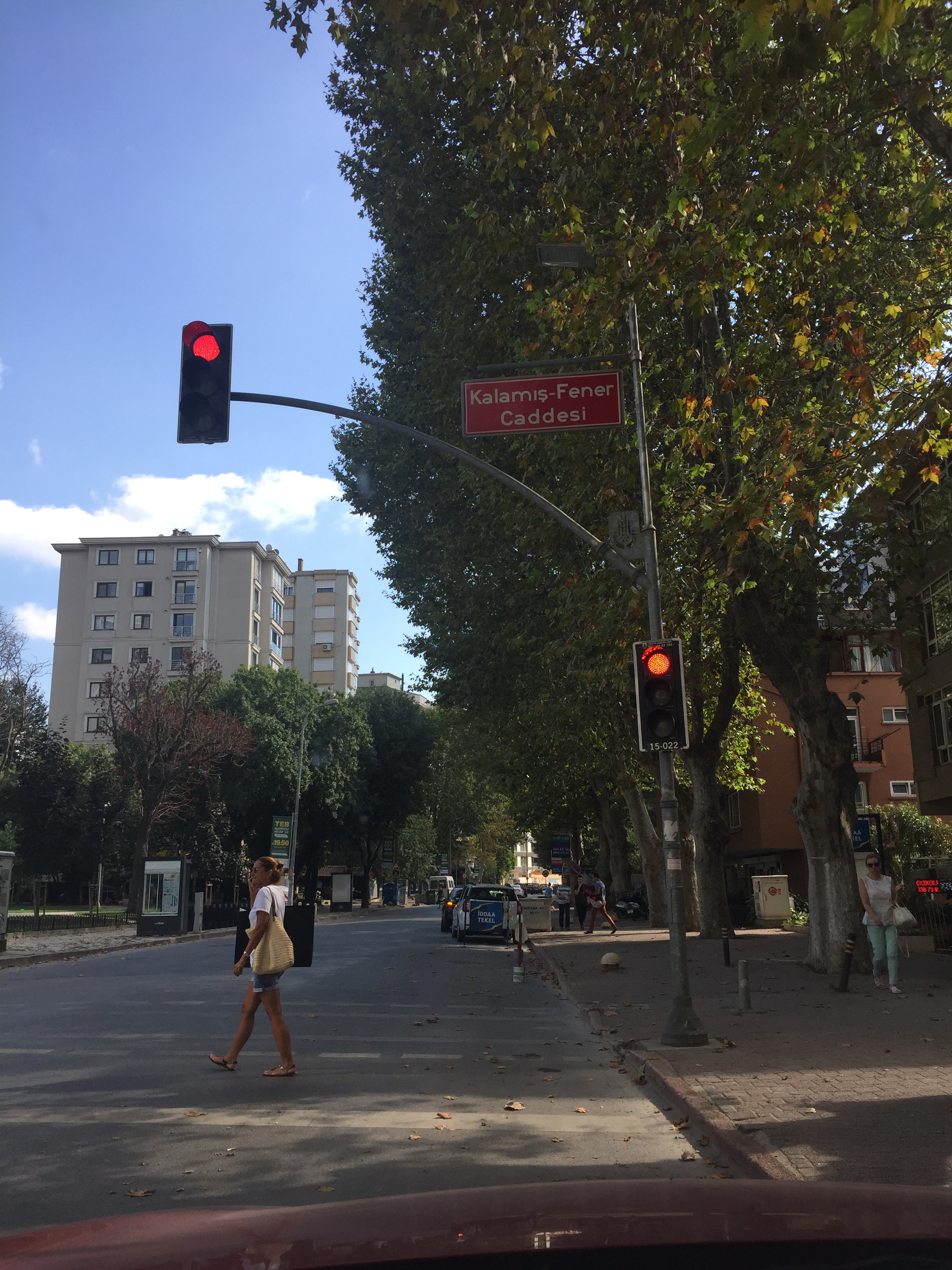
A view from the neighborhood

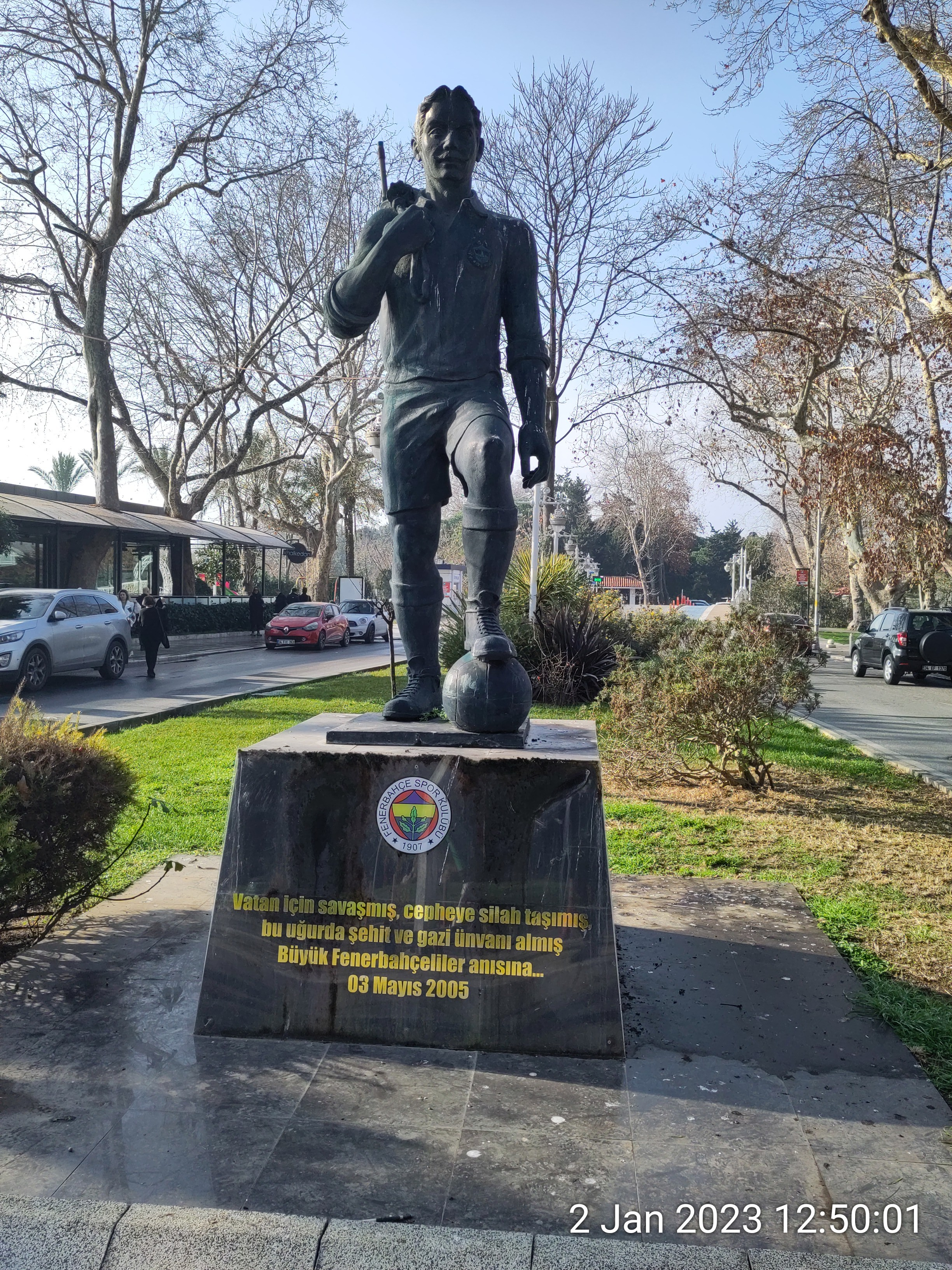
This monument, which was prepared in memory of Fenerbahçe athletes who lost their lives in the wars fought during the establishment of the Ottoman Empire and Modern Turkish state, is located in this region, the hometown of Fenerbahçe.

== See also ==
- Fenerbahçe Lighthouse
- Kalamış
