= Photius II of Constantinople =

Head of the Eastern Orthodox Church from 1929 to 1935

Photius II
- 265th Archbishop of Constantinople, New Rome and Ecumenical Patriarch
- Church: Ecumenical Patriarchate of Constantinople
- See: Constantinople
- In office: 7 October 1929 – 29 December 1935
- Predecessor: Basil III
- Successor: Benjamin I

Personal details
- Born: Dimitrios Maniatis; 1874 Prinkipos, Adalar, Ottoman Empire
- Died: 29 December 1935 (aged 60–61) Fener, Istanbul, Turkey
- Denomination: Eastern Orthodoxy

Ecumenical Patriarch Photius II (Greek: Φώτιος Βʹ; born Dimitrios Maniatis, Δημήτριος Μανιάτης; 1874 – 29 December 1935) was Ecumenical Patriarch of Constantinople from 7 October 1929 until his death in 29 December 1935, serving as the primus inter pares (first among equals) and spiritual leader of Eastern Orthodox Christianity worldwide.

== Biography ==
He was born in 1874 and baptised as Dimitrios Maniatis. After finishing elementary education, he attended the Zariphios School in Philippopolis. He studied theology at the University of Athens and philosophy at LMU Munich. He spoke Greek, Turkish, Bulgarian, French and German fluently.

In 1902, he was ordained deacon. He remained in the Metropolis of Philippopolis, where he reached the rank of protosynkellos. Then was named Patriarchal Exarch of Philippopolis for the period 1906–1914. In 1915, he was elected assistant bishop of Eirinoupoli.

On 7 October 1929, he was elected Ecumenical Patriarch and enthroned on the same day. While in office, the Turkish authorities attempted to reduce the rank of the patriarch to that of "first clergyman" (Baspapaz) of the Rum Patrikhanesi; Photios II responded by refusing to accept or open any envelopes that did not bear the title "Patriarch" or "Ecumenical Patriarch". After over a year, the Turkish authorities relented.

He was in contact with Angelo Giuseppe Roncalli, the future Pope John XXIII, who moved to Istanbul in 1934 and assisted Photios II with the movement of many Jews from Eastern Europe into Palestine. The patriarch Photios II died on 29 December 1935 and was succeeded by Ecumenical Patriarch Benjamin I.

== Notes and references ==
Eastern Orthodox Church titles
Preceded by Basil III	Ecumenical Patriarch of Constantinople; 1929 – 1935	Succeeded by Benjamin I
