= Talabani =

Talabani is a surname. It may refer to:

- Kadir Talabani (born 1986), Iraqi born Norwegian Kurdish actor.
- Jalal Talabani (1933–2017), sixth President of Iraq from 2005 to 2014, 39th Prime Minister of Iraq, leader of the Iraqi Kurdish Patriotic Union of Kurdistan.
  - Héro Talabani, or Hero Ibrahim Ahmed, Kurdish political figure, spouse of Jalal Talabani.
  - Bafel Talabani, Iraqi Kurdish politician, Co-President of the Patriotic Union of Kurdistan since 2020. Older son of Jalal Talabani.
  - Qubad Talabani (born 1977), Iraqi Kurdish politician, deputy prime minister of the Kurdistan Regional Government since 2005. Son of Jalal Talabani.
  - Lahur Talabany (born 1976), Iraqi Kurdish politician, Co-President of the Patriotic Union of Kurdistan since 2020. Nephew of Jalal Talabani.
- Mukarram Talabani (1923–2025), Iraqi Kurdish politician and government minister.
- Sheikh Riza Talabani (1835–1910), celebrated Kurdish poet from Kirkuk, Iraq, writing poetry in Kurdish, Turkish, Persian and Arabic.
