= Sara Rashid =

Iraqi–British health and post-conflict activist

- Born: 27 March 1987 (age 39); Surrey, United Kingdom
- Education: University College London (MSc); King's College London (BSc)
- Occupations: Health and post-conflict activist
- Known for: President of Kurdistan Save the Children (KSC)
- Office: President of Kurdistan Save the Children
- Parents: Abdul Latif Rashid (father); Shanaz Ibrahim Ahmed (mother)
- Relatives: Ibrahim Ahmad (grandfather); Hero Ibrahim Ahmed (aunt); Asoz Latif Rashid (brother)

Sara Rashid (born 27 March 1987) is an Iraqi–British health and post-conflict activist. She is the President of Kurdistan Save the Children (KSC) and has led projects that provide protection, healthcare, and education to children affected by war in Iraq, including the Kurdistan Region.

== Early life and education ==
Sara Rashid was born on 27 March 1987 in Surrey, United Kingdom. She is the daughter of Iraq's President Abdul Latif Rashid and First Lady Shanaz Ibrahim Ahmed, the granddaughter of the Kurdish judge, writer, and politician Ibrahim Ahmad, and the niece of former first lady of Iraq Hero Ibrahim Ahmed.

She attended Old Palace School of John Whitgift in Croydon, England. Sara holds a master's degree from University College London in Global Health & Development after researching mortality estimates in the 2003 Iraq war and their implications on policy. She has an undergraduate degree from King's College London.

== Career ==
In 2014, Sara Rashid joined Kurdistan Save the Children (KSC) as a senior officer responsible for planning, implementing, and reviewing the organization's emergency response for IDPs and refugees, and partnerships with local and international actors.

She co-led the child protection cluster for coordinating the refugee and IDP response, with a focus on child labor and child marriage. She led the child labor task force, which initiated the creation of a legitimized child protection monitoring committee that is still in operation today.

In March 2014, Sara Rashid contributed to research on global health diplomacy in Iraq, published in the Medicine, Conflict and Survival journal.

In 2015, Sara served on the board of directors of the SEED Foundation in the Kurdistan Region, Iraq.

Sara Rashid led the launch of the Kurdistan Save the Children's (KSC) STEM education initiative in Iraq and the Kurdistan Region. In partnership with World Learning and funded by the Catalyst Foundation for Universal Education, the program was also extended to Syrian children in refugee camps in Iraq.

Since 2019, Sara also led the drive to provide medical care for children in need of specialized treatment otherwise unavailable in Iraq.

In 2019, Sara Rashid was appointed as the country champion for cancer and received specialized training from the Union for International Cancer Control on leadership and advocacy to help develop a national cancer control plan.

In 2023, she oversaw the expansion of KSC's activities, including a national "No to Drugs, Yes to Life" campaign. Sara also lobbies the government to adopt a more holistic approach to combating drug trafficking, focusing on rehabilitation instead of incarceration.

In September 2023, Sara Rashid became the President of Kurdistan Save the Children (KSC).

In June 2025, Sara Rashid represented KSC at the Fourth International Conference on Financing for Development (FfD4), held in Seville, Spain. In September 2025, she addressed a side event of the United Nations General Assembly co-hosted by the Summit of First Ladies and Gentlemen Global Platform (SFLG).
