= Mala Bakhtiyar =

Iraqi Kurdish politician

- حیکمەت محەممەد کەریم (مەلا بەختیار)
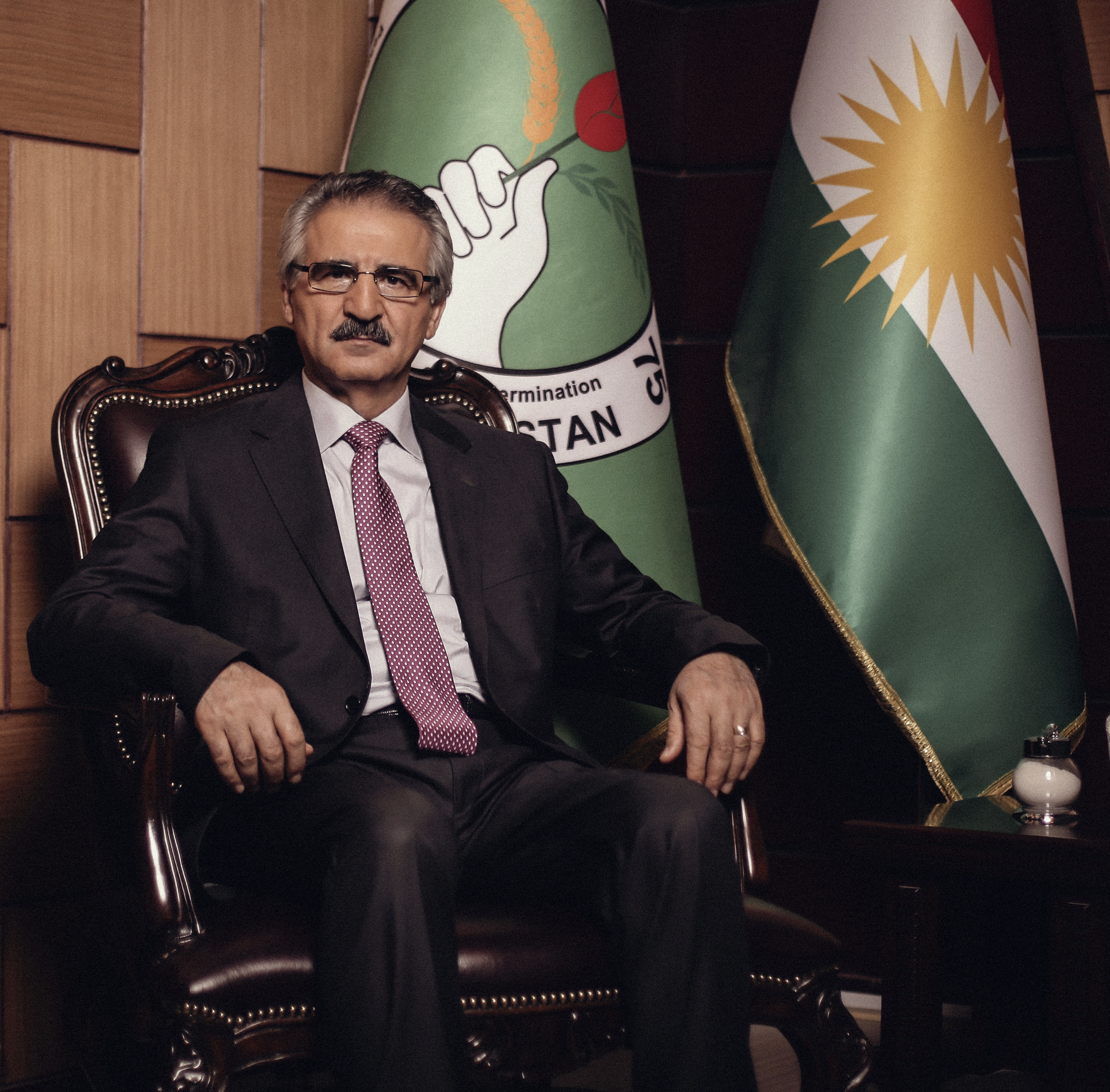
- Born: Hikmat Muhammad Karim; August 20, 1954 (age 72); Khanaqin
- Other name: Mala Bakhtiyar
- Citizenship: Iraq
- Occupations: politician Writer
- Years active: 1970–Present
- Title: Politician
- Political party: Patriotic Union of Kurdistan

Hikmat Muhammad Karim (born 20 August 1954, Khanaqin), known as Mala Bakhtiyar or Mala Bakhtiar (Kurdish: مه‌لا به‌ختیار, Mala Baxtiyar), is a prominent political leader and senior Iraqi Kurdish politician. He is a commander and general of the Kurdish PUK Peshmerga forces and is considered one of the most powerful people in Iraq. Mala Bakhtiar previously served as the chief of the Executive Bureau of the Patriotic Union of Kurdistan. Currently, he is the joint leader of the Supreme Political Council of the Patriotic Union of Kurdistan (PUK), alongside Kosrat Rasul Ali.

In 1986, Bakhtiyar left the Patriotic Union of Kurdistan to establish his own party, called Alayî Şoriş (Banner of Revolution). However, in 1990, the party merged with the Kurdistan Toilers' Party. Following the 1992 Kurdistan Region parliamentary election, Mala Bakhtiyar and most of the former Alayî Şorîş leadership left the party and rejoined the PUK. Upon his return, he became a member of the party's leadership council.

Mala Bakhtiar was awarded a medal for being the best national and intellectual figure of the middle east by the International Union of Economists and Managers in the European Union and was recognized as an international democratic figure in 2014. His power was on the rise after the PUK held its 4th congress on 19 December 2019, during which he was elected into the Supreme Political Council of the PUK.

== 2021 poisoning incident ==
In late 2021, Mala Bakhtiyar, was flown to Berlin, Germany, for medical treatment. Medical tests conducted at the Al Khalidi Medical Center in Jordan and the Vivantes Hospital Group in Germany confirmed that Bakhtiyar had been poisoned with mercury.

During a press conference following his return to Sulaymaniyah in November 2021, Bakhtiyar stated that the poisoning had occurred earlier in July 2021. The incident took place amidst an intense internal power struggle within the PUK leadership between Bafel Talabani and Lahur Talabany, during which Bakhtiyar had maintained a neutral stance. The poisoning plot also targeted other regional officials, including Hassan Nuri, the former head of the Sulaymaniyah Asayish security forces, whose diagnosis was also confirmed during medical treatment in Germany. Concurrently, Bafel Talabani claimed in September 2021 that he had also been targeted by an internal house poisoning attempt. Following the revelations, the Iraqi legal system opened an investigation into the assassination attempts, with perpetrators potentially facing the death penalty under regional laws.

== Publications ==
- Kurdish Revolution and Modern Changes (1992)
- Becoming Rebellious to History (2nd ed., 1998)
- At service of Literature (1998)
- Democracy after Cold War (1999)
- Collection of Some Topics (1999)
- Democracy between Modernism and Post-modernism (2000)
- Rational Freedom and Civil Society (2001)
- Democracy and its Enemies (1st ed., 2006; 2nd ed., 2014)
- A Bunch of History of Kurdistan Toilers Party, or Komala (2012)
- Spiritual Totalitarianism and Duties of Modern Enlightenment, A Response to Secretary-General of Kurdistan Islamic Union's Report (2013)
- Anaka Discourse and Turning of Contemporary Kurdish Struggle (2013)
- A Group of Essays on the 38th anniversary of PUK
- Intersection of Democracy and Salafism (1st ed., 2014)
- Modern Political Roadmap in the Middle East (2014)
- Kurdistan Revolutions and Modern Changes (2015)
- Kurdistan, HDP and Turkey, Towards Which Political Harbor?
- ISIS, Expectations of its Emergence and Its Risks.
