= CTG Kurdistan =

Elite Kurdish counterterrorism unit

Counter-Terrorism Group
- Sorani Kurdish: دەزگای دژەتیرۆر romanized: Dezgay Dijê Tiror
- CTG Logo
- Active: 2002 – present
- Country: Iraq
- Allegiance: Kurdistan Regional Government; PUK
- Branch: Peshmerga
- Type: Counter-terrorism, Intelligence
- Role: Special Operations; Intelligence; Counterterrorism; Counter-insurgency; Special reconnaissance; Unconventional warfare; High-value targets; Manhunting; Security
- Size: >1000 (2010)
- Garrison/HQ: Sulaymaniyah (Ground Forces) and Arbat Airport (Air Force)
- Nicknames: "ISIS Hunting Club" and "Kurdish Tiger Force"
- Motto: Lexoman Parastin (lit.: “Those who give their lives to protect their people.”)
- Engagements: War on terror; Operation Viking Hammer; 2003 invasion of Iraq; War in Iraq (2013–2017); War against the Islamic State; 2025 Sulaymaniyah clashes
- Website: https://ctgkurdistan.com/

Commanders
- Commander: Wehab Helebcî (2021-present)
- Notable commanders: Polad, Lahur (ousted in 2021) and Bafil Talebanî (formerly)

Counter-Terrorism Group (CTG) (Kurdish: دەزگای دژەتیرۆر, romanized: Dezgay Dijê Tiror) or Kurdistan Counter-Terrorism Unit is a Peshmerga unit and the primary investigative arm of the Kurdistan Regional Government. The unit was established by the Patriotic Union of Kurdistan's (PUK) intelligence service (called Ajansî Zanyari) in 2002 with support from the United States and the Central Intelligence Agency (CIA) in response to the growing influence and threat coming from Ansar al-Islam.

The unit’s primary responsibilities include investigating crimes, gathering intelligence, and conducting raids on terrorist cells, all in support of maintaining both the internal and external security of the Kurdistan Region. The unit holds official authority to arrest individuals and has jurisdiction over a range of crimes within the region, with a primary focus on terrorism. The CTG operates with the permission of local authorities in the whole of Iraq, including the disputed regions.

== History ==
The CTG played a major role in the war on terror, considering its size and experience at the time. Shortly after its founding in 2002, the CTG successfully took part in the U.S.-led Operation Viking Hammer together with the 10th Special Forces Group, to eliminate Ansar al-Islam terrorists in Halabja. In 2004 the CTG captured the infamous Al-Qaeda terrorist Hassan Ghul, and turned him over to the U.S.-American intelligence service. During the U.S. occupation of Iraq, the CTG frequently conducted missions against Abu Musab az-Zarqawi's Al-Qaeda network. In 2009, the CTG's operational capabilities were fully occupied, due to many kidnappings. One particularly difficult, but successful, rescue operation was conducted in Sadr City, Baghdad, after the kidnapping of a Kurdish child. This resulted in a diplomatic pat between the governments of the Kurdistan Region and Iraq, in which the Iraqis accused the CTG of being an "out-of-control rogue unit". Polad Talabani, the then-commander, rebuked any such claims, stating that he sent numerous requests for assistance to the Iraqis, all of which went unanswered.

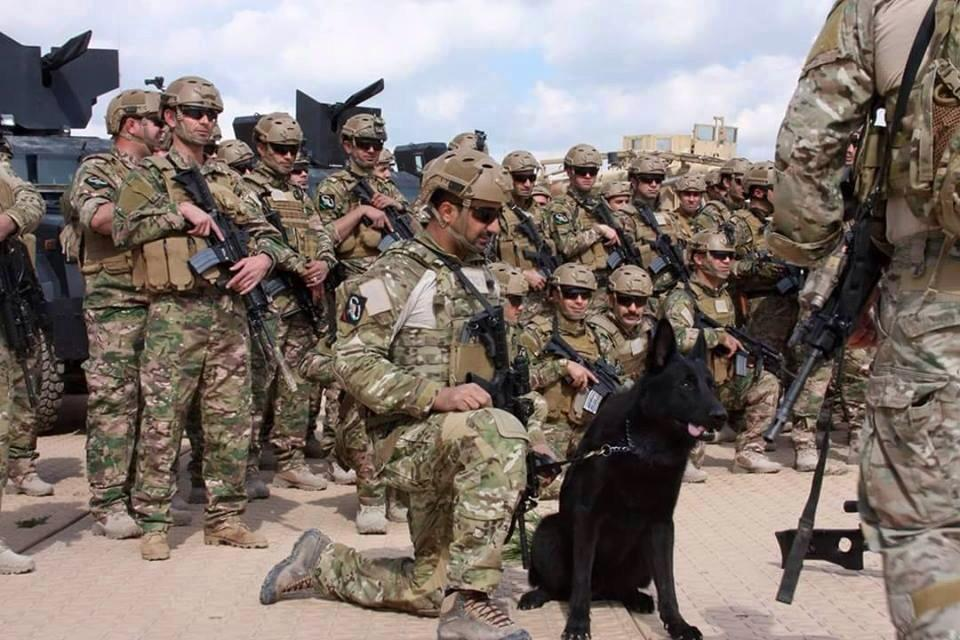
Group of CTG operators

In the War against the Islamic State (ISIS) the unit gained massive importance again and was trained and supplied by various Western militaries and special forces. In the Kurdistan Region and Iraq the unit operated in Erbil, Mosul, Kirkuk, Diyala, Makhmur, Jalawla and other regions. The CTG has participated in nearly every Peshmerga offensive in the south of the Kurdistan Region. Due to the group's effectiveness in combating ISIS, they adopted the nickname "ISIS Hunting Club".

The group has also been active in the Kurdish regions of Syria. In 2014 the group helped in the airdropping of supplies, to the besieged town of Kobane. In an apparent special operation involving V-22 Ospreys, CTG operators may have participated in the assault on the Tabqa Dam in 2017, together with U.S. special forces.

In 2018, CTG units rescued 3 Peshmerga POWs in the Dibis region from ISIS captivity. In the same year CTG forces were deployed to Kirkuk city, which was captured by the Iraqi Army in the 2017 Iraqi–Kurdish conflict a few months earlier. The CTG's task was to secure the Kurdish Newroz celebrations.

In May 2021, Yahoo! News reported that the CTG were involved in the Assassination of Qasem Soleimani. Allegedly CTG operators were deployed on the ground in Baghdad, dressed up as civilians, airport personnel and police officers. They helped to track down Soleimani's movements near the Baghdad International Airport, assisted U.S. sniper teams and confirmed Soleimani's death by taking photographs and obtaining a tissue sample for DNA confirmation.

In July 2021, Polad and Lahur Talabani, two influential commanders within the CTG and co-chairs of the PUK, were expelled from the party by their cousins, Bafel and Qubad Talabani, during a power struggle. The CTG’s command was also reorganized, with members loyal to Bafel installed in key positions.

In August 2025, CTG forces participated in the arrest of the previously deposed Polad and Lahur Talabani, following the issuance of an arrest warrant by a court in Sulaimaniyah.

On 20 January 2026, the CTG released footage showing its operators active in Hasakah alongside the Syrian Democratic Forces’ (SDF) Anti-terror units during the 2026 northeastern Syria offensive.

== Cooperations ==
U.S. and British special forces like the Delta Force and the 22 SAS have maintained close partnerships with the CTG, offering extensive support in training and equipping the unit, as well as participating in joint operations. Support for Kurdistan's Peshmerga increased significantly during the War against ISIS.

In 2024, the unit was invited to participate in the Annual Warrior Competition in Amman, Jordan, competing against soldiers from 19 other nations.

== Equipment ==
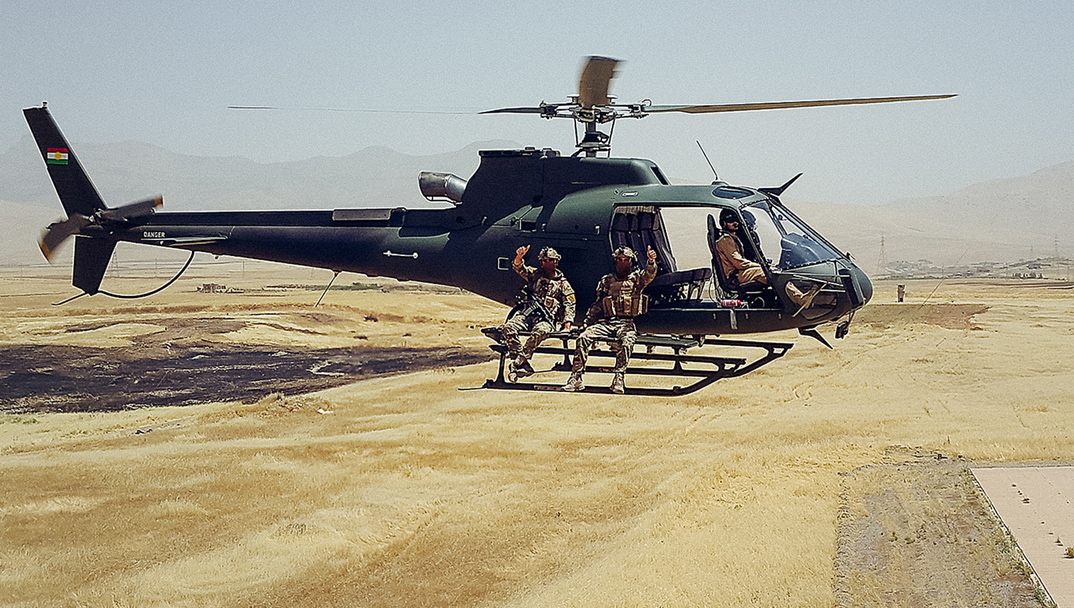
CTG operators on a helicopter.

According to the estimations of former commander Polad Talabani, each CTG operator carries around $60,000 worth of weapons and equipment during a mission. These include multicam uniforms, M4 carbine rifles, Barrett M82 sniper rifles, and night vision devices. After the U.S.' withdrawal from Iraq in 2011, the unit received no more equipment for a short period of time, therefore the CTG acquired, on its own, IAG Guardian armored vehicles from the UAE.

Since 2009, the unit also operates aircraft and helicopters at the Arbat Agricultural Airport and the Sulaimaniyah International Airport. The group's small air force is used for scouting and transportation operations. It consists of at least one Eurocopter EC225 medium-lift helicopter, three AS350B3 helicopters, an unspecified number of MD Helicopters MD 530, two AutoGyro Europe MTO sport and at least two Blackshape Prime fixed-wing ultralight aircraft.

== See also ==
- Counter Terrorism Department (CTD) – hybrid Peshmerga unit and intelligence agency part of the Kurdistan Region Security Council
- Gulan Forces – similar Peshmerga unit affiliated with the Kurdistan Democratic Party
