= Silk Route Transit Network =

Fiber-optic infrastructure project

The Silk Route Transit Network is a fiber-optic infrastructure project developed by iQ Networks, a subsidiary of iQ Group Holding. Its purpose is to connect Europe and Asia through Iraq, avoiding traditional routes like the Red Sea and the Suez Canal. The project aims to serve as a key IP transit route, providing faster and more efficient data transfer between continents, and positioning Iraq as a hub for data connectivity in the Middle East.

== History ==
Conceptualization (2010)

The Silk Route Transit Network was proposed in 2010 by iQ Networks, the aim was to create a fiber-optic network providing a direct link between Europe and Asia, avoiding the congested routes through the Red Sea and Egypt.

Project Launch (2010–2014)

Despite Iraq's political and security challenges, the project commenced with the installation of over 3,000 kilometers of fiber-optic cable across the country. This initiative aimed to rebuild Iraq's digital infrastructure and support economic recovery by enhancing connectivity.

Delays and Resumption (2014–2020)

The project faced delays due to regulatory and geopolitical challenges as well as regional conflicts, including the ISIS crisis. However, iQ Networks used this period to redesign and improve the existing network, and by 2020, the project resumed with new investments.

Completion and Expansion (2020–present)

By Q4 2023, the network was fully operational, covering 3,500 kilometers across Iraq. It features multiple layers of fiber-optic cables and provides a short, efficient route for data transmission between Europe and Asia.

== Overview ==
The network connects key cities across Iraq and extends beyond national borders, with six cable landing stations in strategic locations such as Ibrahim Xalil (Turkey) Al-Faw (Persian Gulf), and Arar (Saudi Arabia). The network provides low-latency connectivity, with delays as short as 70 milliseconds. It supports high-speed data transmission for services like cloud computing and online gaming. The Silk Route Transit Network is important for Iraq's digital transformation. It helps diversify the economy by attracting investments in technology and digital services, reducing reliance on oil exports. As a data transit hub, it positions Iraq to meet the global need for reliable internet connectivity. iQ Group plans to increase the network's capacity for more data and explore innovations like solar-powered data centers. These steps aim to strengthen Iraq's position as a tech hub in the Middle East.
