= Qubad Talabani =

Iraqi Kurdish politician

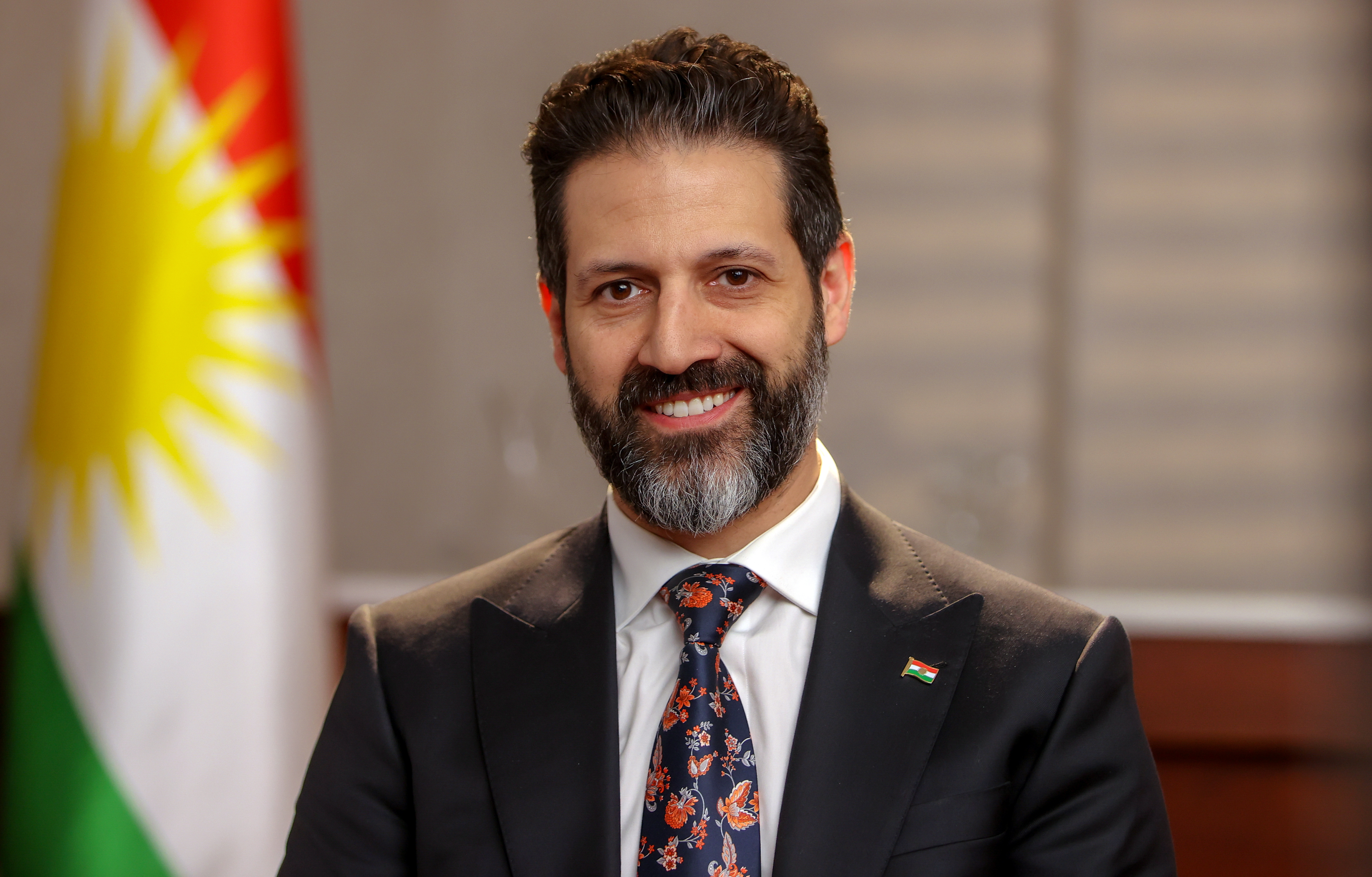
- Talabani in 2022

Deputy Prime Minister of the Kurdistan Region
- Incumbent
- Assumed office June 2014

Personal details
- Born: 21 July 1977 (age 49) Damascus, Syria
- Citizenship: Iraq; United Kingdom
- Party: Patriotic Union of Kurdistan
- Other political affiliations: Kurdistan Coalition (2021)
- Spouse: Sherri Kraham
- Parents: Jalal Talabani (father); Hero Ibrahim Ahmed (mother)
- Relatives: Bafel Talabani (brother); Lahur Talabani (cousin); Ibrahim Ahmad (grandfather); Shanaz Ibrahim Ahmed (aunt)
- Website: https://qubadtalabani.krd/?lang=en

Qubad Talabani (Kurdish: قوباد تاڵەبانی, romanized: Qubad Talebanî, Arabic: قباد طالباني; born 21 July 1977) is an Iraqi Kurdish politician who has been the deputy prime minister of the Kurdistan Region since 2014. Formerly serving as the representative of Kurdistan to the United States, Qubad is the second son of former Iraqi President Jalal Talabani.

== Early life ==
Talabani was born in 1977 and grew up in Surrey, United Kingdom, with his maternal grandparents, Ibrahim Ahmed, a novelist, poet and a founder of the modern intellectual Kurdish movement, and Galawejh Ahmed (also a novelist). His family has been involved in Kurdish politics for decades; His father, Jalal Talabani, was the president of Iraq from 2005 until 2014.

After graduating from high school, he obtained a diploma in motor vehicle engineering at Carshalton College, and later received a degree in mechanical engineering at the Kingston University in London.

== Political career ==
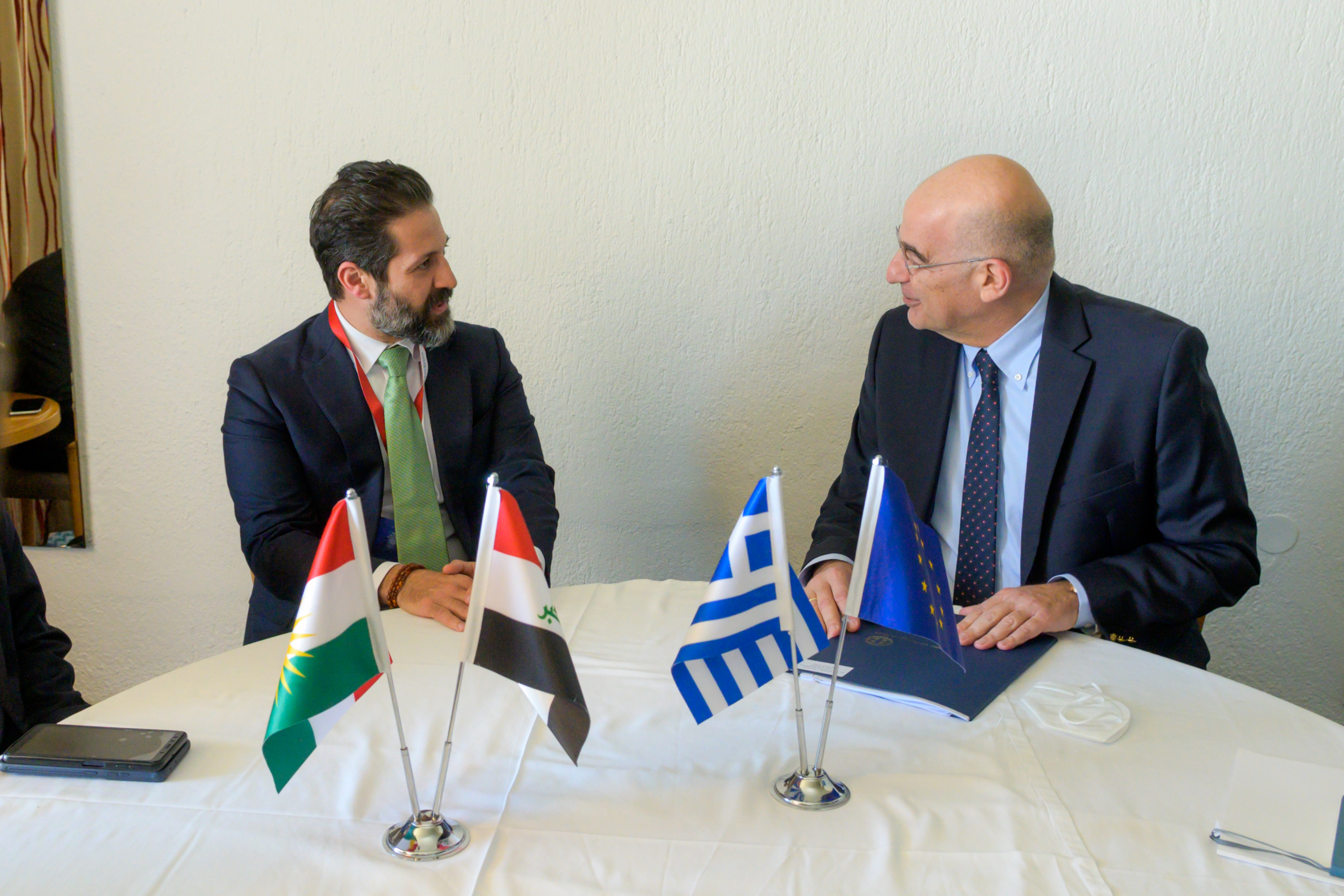
Qubad Talabani with the Greek Minister of Foreign Affairs, Nikos Dendias, at the 2022 Delphi Economic Forum

From 2001 to 2003, Qubad worked as a special assistant to Barham Salih, at that time the Representative of the Patriotic Union of Kurdistan (one of Iraq's leading Kurdish political parties) in Washington D.C., and later as the Deputy PUK Representative. In 2003, he returned to Kurdistan for one year and served as the PUK's Senior Foreign Relations officer to the coalition forces and the Coalition Provisional Authority. He also acted as a liaison officer between the PUK and U.S. military forces in Iraq. He was a leading negotiator in the drafting of the Transitional Administrative Law (TAL), the first Iraqi constitution since the overthrow of Saddam Hussein.

In April 2004, Qubad returned to the US, and was stationed as the representative of the PUK and Kurdistan.

In 2006, with the unification of the two administrations in Kurdistan and following the forming of the Democratic Patriotic Alliance of Kurdistan and the establishment of the Kurdish National Assembly, Qubad was appointed as the first representative of the Kurdistan Region, a position he has held until 2012 In 2014 he was nominated deputy prime minister of the government of the Kurdistan region and was involved in the implementation of the biometric registration system for government employees.

He was first sworn in as deputy prime minister of the KRG Cabinet in June 2014, where he took office. Receiving no fiscal transfers from the Government of Iraq (GoI), coupled with rapidly declining oil prices, the Kurdistan region was in the midst of a severe financial crisis. Moreover, the Islamic State was rampaging its way throughout Iraq, claiming territory and establishing itself as one of history's most brutal terrorist organizations, resulting in a major humanitarian crisis that forced 1.8 million people to flee war and violence and seek refuge in the Kurdistan region. During this period, the KRG successfully oversaw a package of reforms.

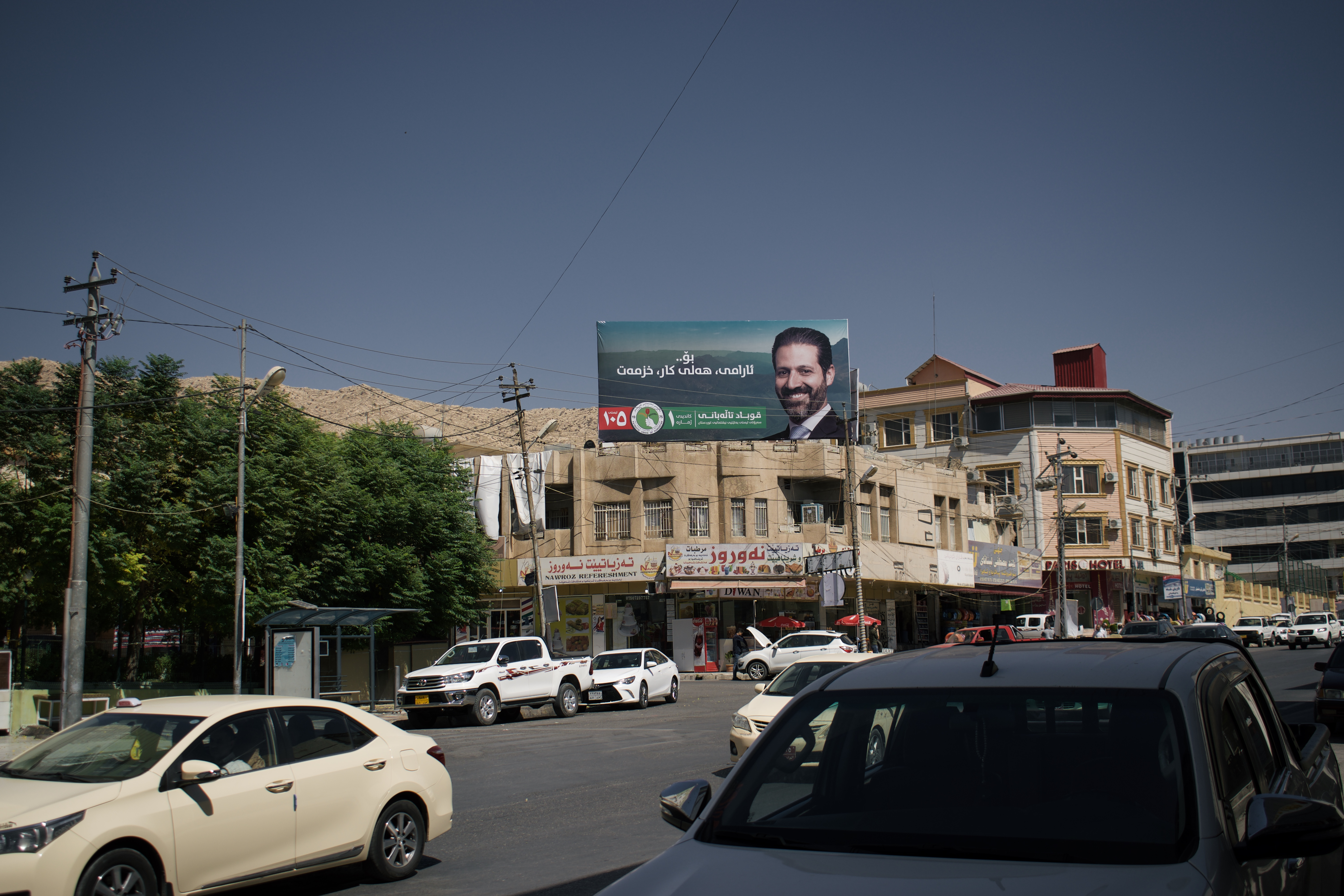
Qubad Talabani billboard in Duhok, 2018

A major part of the KRG's economic reform plan included improving oversight of government expenditures. To that end, Talabani successfully oversaw the design and implementation of his government's biometric registration program.

During the KRG's Seventh Cabinet, Talabani established and headed up the Department of Coordination and Follow-up to facilitate inter-ministerial coordination. He directed that KRG agency on behalf of the Prime Minister for two years.

In the parliamentary elections of the Kurdistan region of 2018 he was elected to parliament but he did not assume his post.

In the fourth congress of the PUK in December 2019, he was appointed to the leadership council of the PUK.

In july, 29 2021, Talabani was elected as the leader of the Kurdistan Coalition. It was a coalition formed by the Patriotic Union of Kurdistan and the Gorran Movement for the 2021 Iraqi parliamentary election

== Personal life ==
Talabani lives in Erbil with his wife Sherri Kraham to who he got married in 2005 in Il Castello del Palagio in Italy. The couple have two children, Ari and Lara.
