= Shanaz Ibrahim Ahmed =

Iraqi first lady and politician

First Lady of Iraq
- In office 17 October 2022 – 12 April 2026
- President: Abdul Latif Rashid
- Preceded by: Sarbagh Salih

Personal details
- Born: 1954 (age 71–72) Sabonkaran, Sulaymaniyah, Kingdom of Iraq
- Party: Patriotic Union of Kurdistan
- Spouse: Abdul Latif Rashid
- Children: 3, including Asoz and Sara
- Parent: Ibrahim Ahmad (father)
- Relatives: Hero Ibrahim Ahmed (sister); Jalal Talabani (brother-in-law)

Shanaz Ibrahim Ahmed (Sorani Kurdish: شاناز ئیبراهیم ئەحمەد) (born 1954) is an Iraqi-Kurdish politician and former First Lady of Iraq. Her husband is former president Abdul Latif Rashid. She is a daughter of the Kurdish judge, writer, and politician Ibrahim Ahmed, and novelist Galawezh Salh Fatah. She is also a sister of former First Lady of Iraq, Hero Ibrahim Ahmed.

Shanaz is a member of a prominent, politically active family from Sulaymaniyah and is closely associated with the Patriotic Union of Kurdistan (PUK) party, which is currently headed by her nephew, Bafel Talabani.

== Early life ==
She was born on January 2, 1954, in the neighborhood of Sabonkaran in Sulaymaniyah Governorate to Ibrahim Ahmad and Galawezh Salh Fatah. She was the third of eight children. As a child, she and her family relocated regularly due to her father's activities and political instability, and her education was routinely interrupted.

Following the 1958 military coup in Iraq, her family relocated to Baghdad where she attended the Mamounia Elementary School. In 1962, the family returned to Sulaymaniyah where she continued her studies at Khanzad School. During this period, due to regular political instability, Shanaz and her family were often forced to find refuge in the Zagros Mountains. In 1964, as a result of Kurdish factional infighting, the family fled to border villages in Iran before moving to Tehran. Two years later, the family moved to Baghdad where Shanaz completed her secondary studies at a Persian school. In September 1972, she began science studies at Baghdad University.

As a result of the Iraqi government's crackdown on Kurds in 1973, Shanaz fled to Cairo, Egypt with some of her siblings, including Hero and her husband Jalal Talabani. Her parents and younger siblings went into hiding in the mountains. As she was not permitted to study in Cairo, she left for Beirut, Lebanon to study engineering. In 1974, Shanaz returned to join her parents and the Kurdish resistance in the Zagros Mountains. In 1975, following the signing of the Algiers agreement between Iran and Iraq, the entire family was once again forced to seek refuge in Urmia, Iran. A few months later, they moved to Tehran where she enrolled in Pahlavi University (later Tehran University) to study medicine.

In 1976, Shanaz was engaged to Abdul Latif Rashid, who was then working as a hydraulic engineer in Saudi Arabia. A few months later, facing the prospect of house arrest under a new agreement between the Shah of Iran and the Iraqi government, Shanaz and part of her family fled to Damascus, Syria while her parents sought political asylum in the United Kingdom. In Damascus, Shanaz resumed her medical studies.

On 29 November 1977, Shanaz married Abdul Latif Rashid in Damascus, Syria. A year later, they moved to London. They have two sons and one daughter. Her daughter Sara Rashid is President of Kurdistan Save the Children (KSC), a non-governmental humanitarian organization that co-founded with her sister Hero Ibrahim Ahmed. Her son Zagros Deryn Latif Rashid is prominent Kurdish media executive and producer, currently serving as the CEO of Kurdsat Broadcasting Corporation.

== Career ==
While Shanaz never took part in the armed resistance against Saddam Hussein like her sister Hero and brother-in-law Jalal Talabani, she was integral to the efforts from abroad through fundraising, lobbying, raising international awareness, and organizing political rallies. She also took a lead on humanitarian efforts, while her husband was one of the leading figures of the Iraqi political opposition in exile.

Following the 1991 Kurdish uprising, the first Gulf War, and the imposition of sanctions on Iraq, Shanaz co-founded Kurdistan Save the Children (KSC), a non-governmental humanitarian organization, with her sister Hero Ibrahim Ahmed. Today, KSC is the primary sponsor of a children's activity centre at the Arbat Camp on the outskirts of Sulaymaniyah, which shelters nearly 10,000 refugees, half of them children, who fled ongoing violence in neighbouring Syria since 2013.

Shanaz co-founded the Kurdsat Broadcasting Corporation in January 2000. She also established the Ibrahim Ahmed Foundation.

Along with her husband, she is an collector of Iraqi, Kurdish, and traditional artwork. Part of their vast collection is on display at the Zamwa Gallery and the Latif Rashid Gallery in Sulaymaniyah. She also works on preserving heritage and restoring several Ottoman-era sites, particularly in the Kurdish region.

During her tenure as First Lady of Iraq, she and her husband supported efforts to repatriate Iraqi cultural artifacts looted or removed from the country during periods of conflict, including the 2003 Iraq War, the 1991 Gulf War, the Iran-Iraq War and the First World War.

In February 2024, Shanaz Ibrahim Ahmed was involved in the return and reburial of the remains of 172 victims of the Anfal campaign. The remains had been recovered from mass graves in the Samawa desert in southern Iraq and kept at a forensic medicine facility in Baghdad for more than four years. Together with Iraq’s Association for Martyrs and Mass Graves and the Anfal Monument Cemetery, she helped arrange their transfer to the Kurdistan Region, where they were reburied at the Anfal Monument cemetery in Chamchamal. At the ceremony, she asked the federal government and the Kurdistan Regional Government to formally recognise the Anfal campaign as genocide and to compensate the victims’ families.
