= TS 2 =

Internet provider for U.S. Army soldiers in Afghanistan

TS2 SPACE
- Company type: Private
- Industry: Telecommunication
- Genre: Corporate histories
- Founded: Warsaw, Poland (2004)
- Founder: Marcin Frackiewicz
- Headquarters: Warsaw, Poland
- Products: VSAT, Satellite internet
- Services: Satellite communication
- Website: ts2.space

TS2 SPACE is an Internet service provider for US Army soldiers in Iraq and Afghanistan. Most of its active customers are Polish and US Army soldiers; TS 2 methods have also been implemented for private companies and organizations. The TS 2 network in Iraq and Afghanistan has over 15,000 military users of local broadband satellite connections.

TS2 SPACE also provided telecommunication services for Multi-National Security Transition Command – Iraq (MNSTC-I).

== Military customers in Iraq and Afghanistan ==
In 2007, TS2 SPACE solutions were implemented for numerous NATO military entities.

In 2009, TS2 SPACE began advertising satellite Internet services for the US Marine Corps in Afghanistan.

== See also ==
- iQ Group
