= Adel Murad =

Iraqi Kurdish politician

Adel Murad عادل موراد

General Secretary of PUK, Former Ambassador
- In office 14 June 2013 – 18 May 2018
- Prime Minister: Nechervan Idris Barzani
- Vice President: Kosrat Rasul Ali
- Preceded by: Position established

Personal details
- Born: 11 December 1949 Baghdad, Iraq
- Died: 18 May 2018 (aged 68) Germany
- Party: Patriotic Union of Kurdistan
- Spouse: Ashna Murad
- Children: Nozheen Adel Murad, Solin Adel Murad

Adel Murad (Kurdish: عادل موراد, romanized: Adil Murad; 11 December 1949 – 18 May 2018) was an Iraqi Kurdish politician whom along with Jalal Talabani, Nawshirwan Mustafa, Kamal Fuad, Ali Askari, Fuad Masum and Abdul Razaq Faily, was the co-founder of the main opposition party, the Patriotic Union of Kurdistan. He had previously served as representative of PUK in Baghdad under Iraq's Transitional Government and a Representative of Jalal Talabani in Damascus. He was a graduate of the University of Baghdad, with an MSC in Chemistry. Once a commander and Peshmerga veteran, Murad has since been calling for international support and armament from including Russia to support the Peshmerga forces.

== Ambassador ==
As Ambassador of Iraq in Romania from 2004 to 2009, Murad was responsible for the reopening of diplomatic relations between Iraq and Romania. Adel Murad argued that the billion-dollar debt must be solved through some kind of understanding, such as through business, including giving Romanian companies contracts for petroleum and reconstruction, especially hospitals.

== KRG ==
Adel Murad was the General Secretary of the PUKCC and has been an advocate for Kurdish internal reforms. Murad has been an advocate for Kurdish rights throughout the last 50 years and has encouraged the new generation of Kurds to take up the leadership role of Kurdish politics.

== Iraq and Syria ==
Murad was very optimistic on establishing a 'New Iraq' but has since been pessimistic blaming former Iraqi Prime Minister Nouri al-Maliki. Since the onset of the Syrian civil war, Murad has been supportive of the Rojava liberation movement. In 2013 he criticized the KDP for closing the border and urged KDP to open the border.

Preceded by Patriotic Union of Kurdistan	Ambassador of Iraq in Romania; September 2004-2009	Succeeded by Saad Al Douri
