= Abdul Latif Rashid =

President of Iraq from 2022 to 2026

- عبد اللطيف رشيد لەتيف ڕەشید
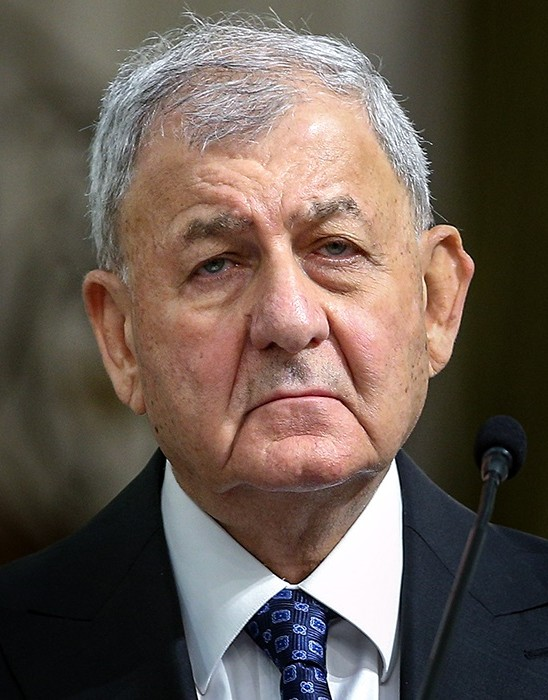
- Rashid in 2023

9th President of Iraq
- In office 17 October 2022 – 12 April 2026
- Prime Minister: Mustafa Al-Kadhimi; Mohammed Shia' Al Sudani
- Vice President: Vacant
- Preceded by: Barham Salih
- Succeeded by: Nizar Amidi

Minister of Water Resources
- In office September 2003 – December 2010
- Prime Minister: Ayad Allawi; Ibrahim al-Jaafari; Nouri al-Maliki
- Preceded by: Coalition Provisional Authority
- Succeeded by: Mohanad Salman al-Sady

Personal details
- Born: 10 August 1944 (age 82) Sulaymaniyah, Kingdom of Iraq
- Citizenship: Iraq; United Kingdom
- Party: Patriotic Union of Kurdistan
- Spouse: Shanaz Ibrahim Ahmed
- Children: 3, including Asoz and Sara
- Relatives: Jalal Talabani (brother-in-law); Ibrahim Ahmed (father-in-law); Hero Ibrahim Ahmed (sister-in-law)
- Education: University of Manchester; University of Liverpool

Abdul Latif Jamal Rashid (Arabic: عبد اللطيف جمال رشيد, romanized: ʻAbd al-Laṭīf Rashīd; born 10 August 1944), also known as Letif Reshid (Kurdish: لەتيف ڕەشید, romanized: Letîf Reşîd), is an Iraqi politician who served as the president of Iraq from 2022 to 2026. He was previously the Minister of Water Resources under the government of Nouri al-Maliki. Before that, he served in the same position under both the Iraqi Transitional Government and the Iraqi Interim Government. Rashid was formerly a spokesperson for the Patriotic Union of Kurdistan (PUK) in the United Kingdom. Rashid is the fourth non-Arab president of Iraq, succeeding Barham Salih.

As Minister for Water Resources from September 2003 until December 2010, Rashid was responsible for a range of issues, including irrigation, municipal and industrial water supply, hydropower, flood control, and environmental requirements, including marsh restoration.

== Professional career ==
Rashid studied engineering in the United Kingdom, and was involved with a number of programmes and organisations related to engineering and agricultural developments. He began his political career in the 1960s, when he joined the Kurdistan Democratic Party.

He previously worked as a senior Project Manager for the United Nations Food and Agriculture Organization (UNFAO) in Yemen and Saudi Arabia. He has been a member of the Executive Council of the Iraqi National Congress (INC), the Patriotic Union of Kurdistan's Representative in the United Kingdom since 1986 and a spokesman for the Kurdistan Front.

Rashid is a chartered engineer and a fellow of the Institution of Civil Engineering and the International Commission on Irrigation and Drainage (ICID). He has been a freelance consultant for irrigation and drainage projects and has worked with the Water Engineering Administration in Iraq.

In 1992, Rashid was elected vice president and Executive Member of the Iraqi National Congress (INC), and in 1998 was elected to the INC's six-member leadership.

== Political career ==
He began his political career in the 1960s, when he joined the Kurdistan Democratic Party. Apart from having technical qualifications and engagements, Rashid has actively participated in Kurdish and Iraqi politics. In 1986, he became the spokesman for the PUK in the United Kingdom. He attended many conferences and official meetings on behalf of Kurdish political parties and Iraqi opposition groups during Saddam's regime. Rashid has also represented Kurdish politics and Iraqi opposition groups to Saddam in official meetings with various international institutions and governments. In 2003, he became the minister of water resources, a post he kept until 2010. He served as a presidential adviser from 2010.

=== Presidency (2022–2026) ===
Under the Muhasasa power-sharing agreement among the major political parties representing the main ethnic and religious groupings in the country, a Kurd is elected as president, a Shia Arab as prime minister, and a Sunni Arab as speaker of parliament. On 13 October 2022, Rashid was elected as the 9th President of Iraq after the fall of the Saddam Hussein regime. Rashid replaced Barham Salih as head of state after the two-round vote in parliament, winning "more than 162 votes" against 99 for Salih. Rashid was backed by the Kurdistan Democratic Party, while the rival Patriotic Union of Kurdistan supported Salih. Rashid "immediately" appointed politician Mohammed Shia' Al Sudani as prime minister-designate. This appointment ended the yearlong deadlock.

In January 2025, President Rashid filed a lawsuit against Prime Minister Mohammed Shia' Al Sudani and Finance Minister Taif Sami requesting a court order mandating the uninterrupted and timely payment of salaries for Kurdistan Region’s civil servants.

==== Foreign policy ====
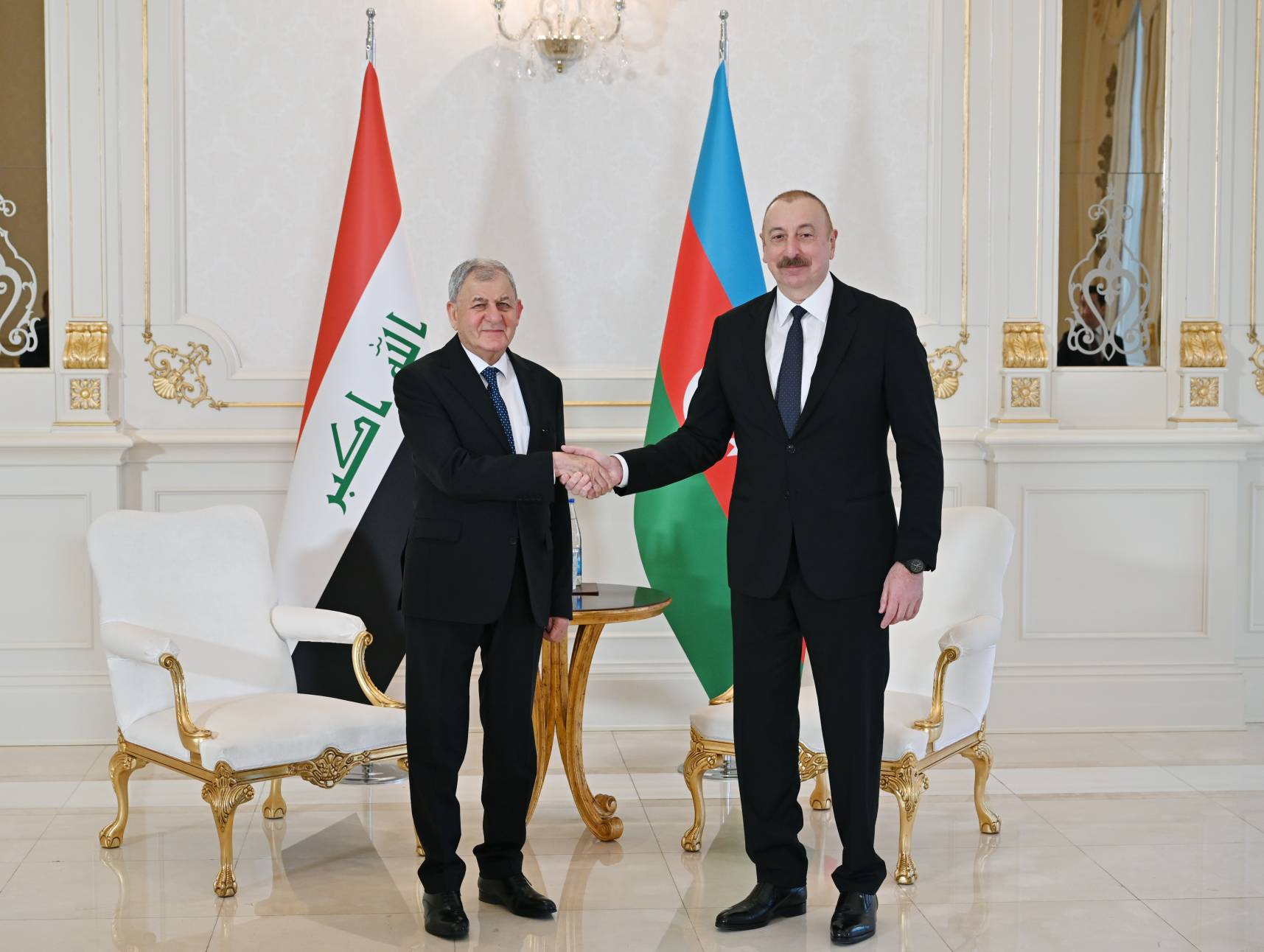
Rashid meets with Azerbaijani President Ilham Aliyev in Baku, 1 March 2023

Rashid opposes the normalization of diplomatic relations with Turkey as long as it violates Iraq's sovereignty. On 8 April 2023, Rashid condemned Turkey's alleged bombardment of an area near Sulaimaniyah airport inside Iraq's autonomous Kurdish region. A source from the Turkish Defense Ministry stated to Agence France Press that Turkey's armed forces "undertook no such activity."

Speaking on 27 February 2023, Rashid said that the 2003 invasion of Saddam-ruled Iraq by the United States and its allies was "necessary" because of the regime's "brutality." He claimed that "after twenty years," now "peace and security [are] all over the country." However, long-awaited public projects, especially in the transport sector, have not materialized, a shortcoming he attributed to lingering corruption. The Iraqi president expressed the belief that "improving relations with neighbors, including Iran, Syria, Kuwait, Saudi Arabia, Turkey, and Jordan, is a source of strength for Iraq."

== Personal life ==
Rashid is from a prominent Kurdish family. He is married to Shanaz Ibrahim Ahmed, daughter of poet Ibrahim Ahmed. They have two sons, Asoz and Zagros, and one daughter, Sara.

Preceded by Coalition Provisional Authority	Minister of Water Resources; September 2003 – December 2010	Succeeded by Mohanad Salman Al-Sady
Preceded by Barham Salih	President of Iraq; 2022 – 2026	Succeeded by Nizar Amidi
