= Kurdistan Save the Children =

Non-profit organization in Iraq

Kurdistan Save the Children (KSC)
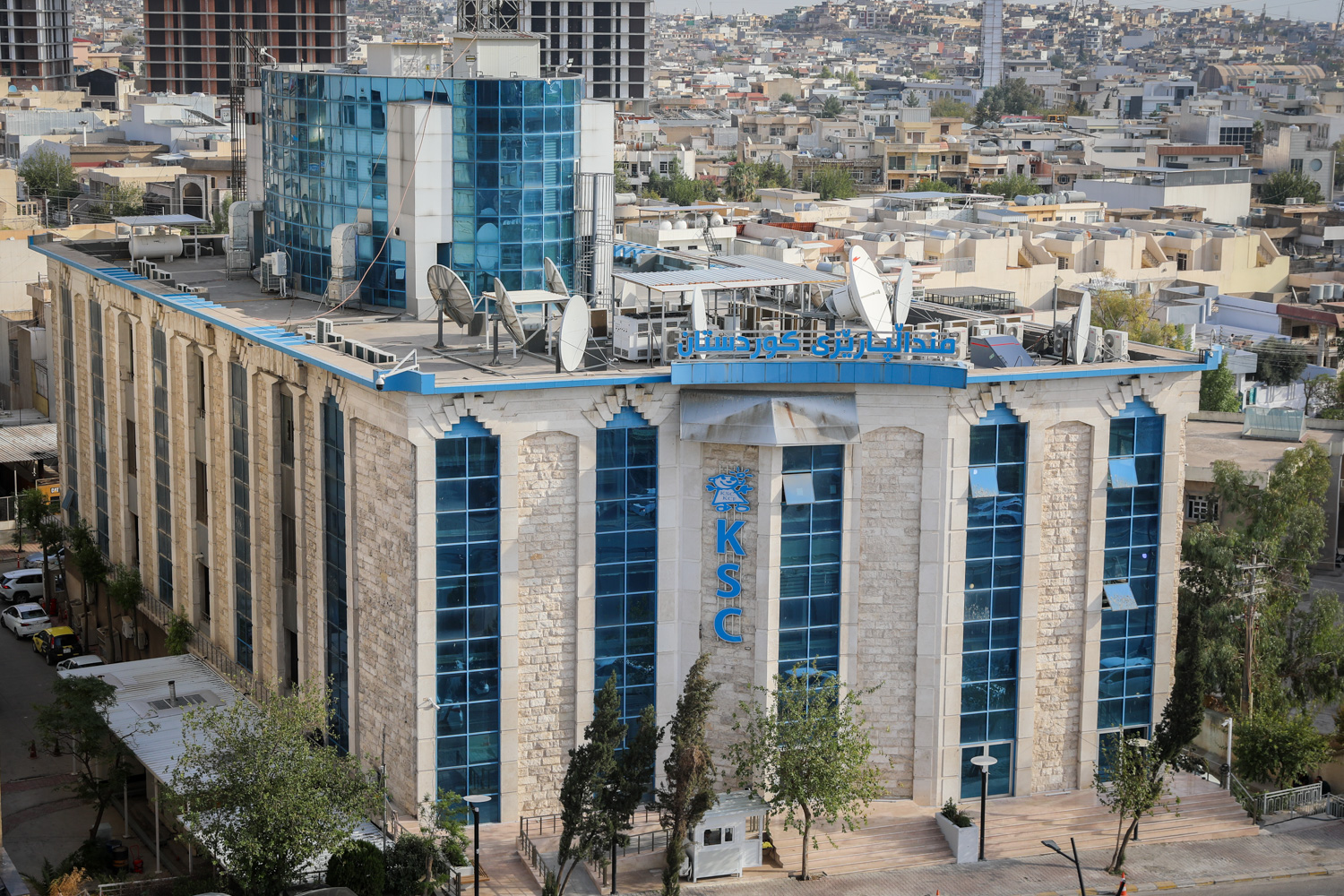
- KSC building in Sulaymaniyah
- Founded: 1991
- Founder: Hero Ibrahim Ahmed
- Type: Non-profit
- Headquarters: Kurdistan Region, Iraq
- Key people: Sara Rashid (president as of 2023)
- Affiliations: UNICEF, UNHCR, ILO, Childhood Cancer International
- Website: http://ksc-kcf.org

Kurdistan Save the Children (KSC) is a non-profit organization founded in 1991 in the Kurdistan Region of Iraq. Its mission is to support children in Iraq of all backgrounds by addressing their healthcare, social, economic, and educational needs.

== History ==
Kurdistan Save the Children (KSC) was founded on September 16, 1991, by Hero Ibrahim Ahmad in the Kurdistan Region of Iraq. The organization was created in response to the severe humanitarian crisis following the 1991 Iraq uprisings, which forced 1.5 million Kurds to flee to the mountains, as well as to neighboring Iran, Turkey, and Western countries.

The UN Security Council responded with Resolution 688, establishing a no-fly zone over Kurdish territory. During this period, the Kurdish population endured extreme hardships, including hunger and exposure to the cold, which resulted in numerous child deaths.

Hero Ibrahim Ahmed founded KSC to offer support to children in need. Initially, the organization operated with a modest budget of 20,000 Iraqi Dinars, a photocopying machine, and an old house in Qala Chwalan.

It focused on distributing second-hand clothing and meeting other immediate needs. Over time, KSC expanded its reach, with Hero's sister, Shanaz Ibrahim Ahmed, the current first lady of Iraq, working to register the organization in the UK to increase funding opportunities.

Sara Rashid took up the position as President of KSC in September 2023.

== Core activities ==
Kurdistan Save the Children (KSC) operates through five core programs: Child Protection, Disaster Relief, Education, Health, and Youth Development. The organization conducts its activities across offices in Sulaymaniyah, Erbil, Duhok, and Kirkuk, collaborating with donors and partnering with other organizations.

- Papula (Butterfly) Magazine: In 1992, the organization launched Papula (Butterfly) Magazine, which has become the longest-running Kurdish children's magazine.
- Fast-Track Program: In 1993, the Fast-Track Program was introduced, opening schools for working children and dropouts, while children's homes for unaccompanied children were set up.
- Shahid Jabar Exemplary High School: In 2001, KSC established Shahid Jabar Exemplary High School in Sulaymaniyah to offer high-quality, English-language education to gifted children, free of charge. The school is widely recognized as one of the best in the region.
- Justice for Children: KSC was instrumental in establishing the first juvenile court and juvenile police in the Kurdistan Region and has advocated for amendments to the Iraqi Juvenile Law.
- Child Labor: Launched in 2007, the Child Labor Project has supported over 22,000 children to date. With an influx of refugees and IDPs from 2024, the project was relaunched. It has now established a child protection monitoring committee in close cooperation with the local government which is responsible for identifying cases of child labor across the Kurdistan Region, and strengthening a mechanism to protect these children from exploitation.
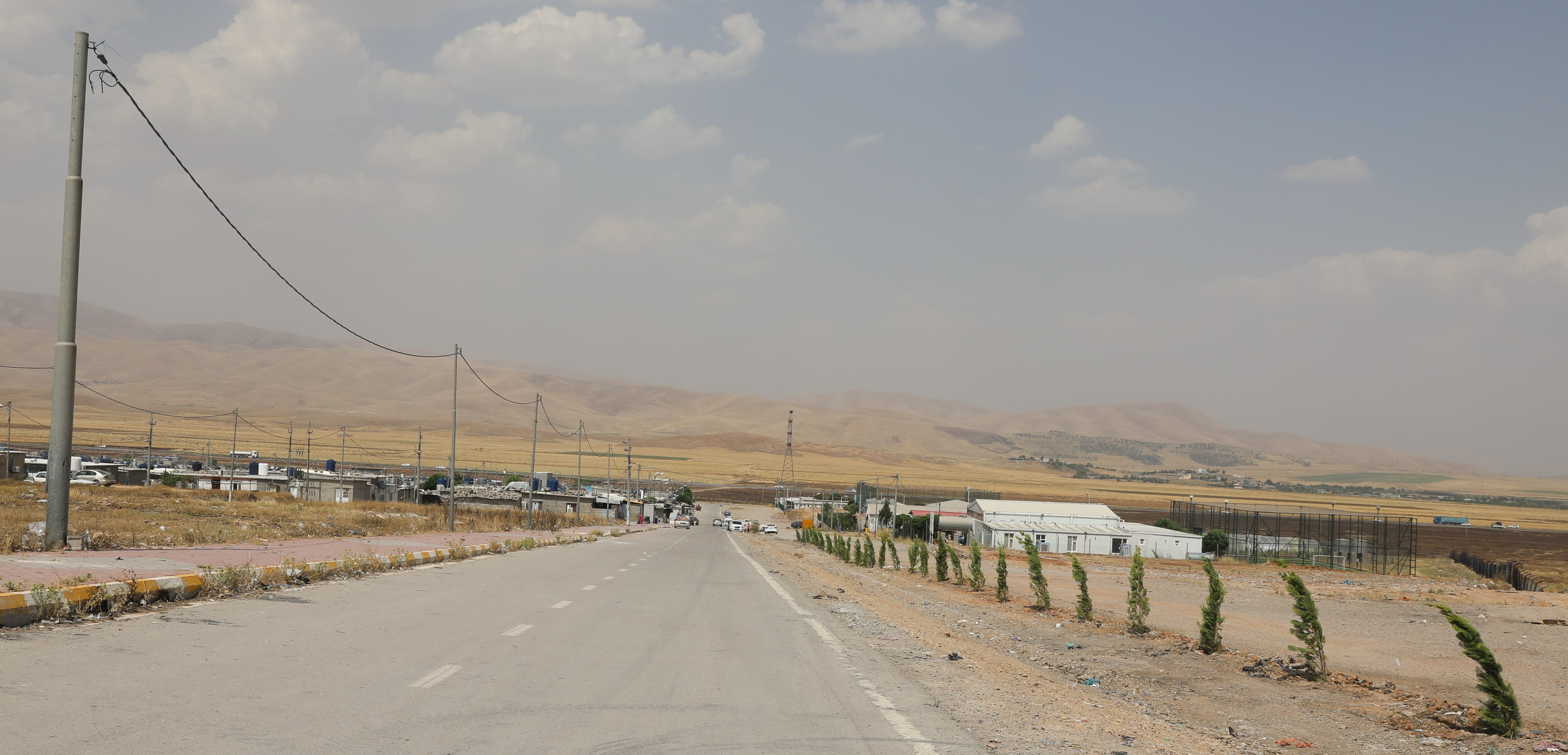
- Arbat Refugee Camp
  Child Health: In 2005, KSC expanded its child health services, from opening a dedicated center for autism to providing medical screenings to over 12,000 children between 2005 and 2021. KSC facilitates the way for children to access healthcare otherwise unattainable. The organization supports children with congenital health disease, scoliosis and cleft lip and palate amongst other conditions with life changing surgeries and treatments. The ARA project, launched in 2014, offers social and psychological support to children with cancer, and operates in oncology hospitals in Sulaymaniyah, Erbil, and Duhok. In 2016, KSC established a premature baby department in Shar Hospital in Sulaymaniyah, followed by a premature baby department at Jamal Ahmad Rashid Children's Hospital in 2021. In 2019, KSC became a member of Childhood Cancer International (CCI) and the Union for International Cancer Control (UICC), and was appointed Champion for Cancer in Iraq, participating in workshops in Oman, Kazakhstan and Jordan. Currently, work is underway to establish a Pediatric Heart Hospital. KSC sponsors several key facilities, including the Shahid Jabbar School, the Sommerlad Center for Cleft Lip and Palate Surgery, Sulaymaniyah Burn and Plastic Surgery Hospital, Children's Heart Hospital in Sulaymaniyah, and neonatal departments in both the children's and maternity hospitals in Sulaymaniyah.
- Emergency & Refugee Relief: In 2015, in response to the humanitarian crisis and the influx of thousands of displaced people into the Kurdistan Region following the rise of ISIS, KSC launched the Child Friendly Space Project. This initiative, in collaboration with UNICEF, provides psychological support to displaced children in camps.
- Anti-Drugs Campaign: In March 2024, KSC launched the nationwide “Say Yes to Life, No to Drugs” campaign with a marathon in Sulaymaniyah along with several meetings, panel discussions and seminars aimed at reaching as many young people as possible. The initiative was introduced in response to reports highlighting the growing impact of the narcotics trade in Iraq.
- Children's Activity Centers (Kaziwa): The Children's Activity Centers offer free educational services to children. Experienced trainers lead activities in areas such as arts, sports, languages, library access, computer skills, music, theater, and recreation. Currently, KSC's Education Program manages five Children's Activity Centers across the Kurdistan Region: Sarra (Sulaymaniyah), Arbat, and Chwarta.
- Juvenile Rehabilitation Center and Juvenile Court: In September 2025, Kurdistan Save the Children (KSC) established a juvenile rehabilitation centre and a specialized juvenile court in Nafkouri, near Qamishli, in northeastern Syria. The facilities were established to provide a separate justice and rehabilitation system for juveniles in conflict with the law, distinct from the system for adult detainees.
- KSC Talks: In May 2026, Kurdistan Save the Children (KSC) launched KSC Talks, a podcast series featuring discussions with specialists and practitioners on issues affecting children and young people. The series is hosted by KSC president Sara Rashid. The first episode featured Canadian physician and author Gabor Maté.

== Partnerships and collaboration ==
KSC has supported over 1 million children through programs like school rehabilitation, mobile health clinics, and child labor protection. Partnerships with international organizations such as UNICEF, UNHCR, Direct Relief, ILO, TGH and the Global Protection Cluster have helped expand its work. KSC is also a member of the Alliance for Child Protection in Humanitarian Action, and Childhood Cancer International.

== Sponsorship ==
In 1991, KSC launched the Sponsorship Program to support orphans as well as fatherless or otherwise disadvantaged children, enabling them to remain in school and refrain from child marriage. Until now, over 10,000 children have received financial support through this initiative.

KSC's Sponsorship Program has provided financial and social support to nearly 9,600 vulnerable children. Through monthly sponsorships from national and international donors, children receive financial aid that improves their economic environment and ensures access to education and reducing the risk of early marriage.

== Awards and recognition ==
In 2017, Hero Ibrahim Ahmed received the Assisi Pax International Award in recognition of her contributions to children's rights and humanitarian efforts.
