= Bafel Talabani =

Iraqi Kurdish politician

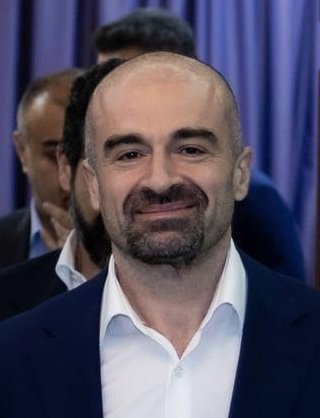
- Talabani in 2022

Leader of the Patriotic Union of Kurdistan
- Incumbent
- Assumed office 18 February 2020 Serving with Lahur Talabani (2020–2021)
- Preceded by: Kosrat Rasul Ali

Personal details
- Born: 19 February 1973 (age 53) Baghdad, Iraq
- Party: Patriotic Union of Kurdistan
- Parents: Jalal Talabani (father); Hero Ibrahim Ahmed (mother)
- Relatives: Qubad Talabani (brother); Lahur Talabani (cousin); Ibrahim Ahmad (grandfather); Shanaz Ibrahim Ahmed (aunt)
- Occupation: Founder of CTG Kurdistan Leader of Patriotic Union of Kurdistan

Military service
- Battles/wars: Iraq War: Islamist insurgency in Iraqi Kurdistan; Operation Viking Hammer

Bafel Jalal Talabani (Kurdish: بافڵ جەلال تاڵەبانی, romanized: Bafił Celal Tałebanî; born 19 February 1973) is an Iraqi Kurdish politician who has served as the leader of the Patriotic Union of Kurdistan (PUK) since 2020. He is the older son of former PUK leader Jalal Talabani.

== Political career ==
After leaving active service, Paviel based himself at the family compound in Sulaymaniyah. He is credited as being a dealmaker and a political fixer within the party, as well as being able to move smoothly across partisan divides in the best interests of Kurdistan. Bafel was also behind his younger brother Qubad Talabani's emergence as a political figure with the latter becoming deputy prime minister of Iraqi Kurdistan.

In 2016, Paveil headed PUK's decision-making body and accompanied PUK's delegation to Iran for talks. He is claimed to have had a decisive role in bringing back traditional PUK leaders as a high-ranking member of the Talabani family. He is credited with de-escalating PUK tensions, restoring a joint leadership of PUK with Gorran Movement and preparing a unified response to Masoud Barzani, former President of Iraqi Kurdistan and leader of the Kurdistan Democratic Party (KDP).

== Developments in late 2017 ==
During the 2017 Kurdistan Region independence referendum, Paviel worked as a mediator between the KRG, Iraq and the international community, and worked to present an alternative delayed-vote solution. Although accepted by the main actors both internally and externally, the solution was ultimately rejected by the Kurdistan Region Parliament.

Paviel blamed the loss of Kirkuk and oil-rich regions on the decision of the Kurds to go ahead with a referendum on independence. an agreement that was accepted and endorsed by the Kurdish Parliament. He called the decision a "colossal mistake", saying a U.S. proposal to postpone the referendum by two years should have been accepted. He was also the mastermind behind the October Betrayal in the Kirkuk crisis.

In October, Iraqi forces took control of Kirkuk province after intense fighting against the Peshmerga. Paviel Talabani purportedly ordered his military forces to withdraw from the region, allowing the Iraqi Army and the Popular Mobilization Forces to establish control of the region.

Paviel, however, strongly denied the accusations. He rejected as "baseless" claims that this was part of a deal he had brokered with Baghdad and Tehran, arguing that his forces had indeed fought and lost soldiers but decided to withdraw because of too many losses had occurred within the ranks of the Peshmerga.

Moreover, it emerged in a New York Times interview published in November 2017 that before the hand-over of Kirkuk, Paviel proposed yet another out of the box solution. He envisioned troops from the American-led coalition against ISIS to take over a large military base near Kirkuk, along with federal forces and Kurdish forces loyal to his father's party. According to the New York Times article, Bafel was unable to build consensus among the PUK and the ruling Kurdistan Democratic Party to proceed with his alternative plan.

== Personal life ==
He is the son of Jalal Talabani, former secretary-general of the Patriotic Union of Kurdistan (PUK) and Hero Ibrahim Ahmed. He is the older brother of Qubad Talabani and a cousin of Lahur Talabany. He is married to the daughter of Mala Bakhtiyar, considered a mastermind of the PUK. On 27 August 2020, Bafel tested positive for COVID-19. On 8 September 2020, he recovered from the coronavirus.
