= 2022 Iraqi presidential election =

- 13 October 2022
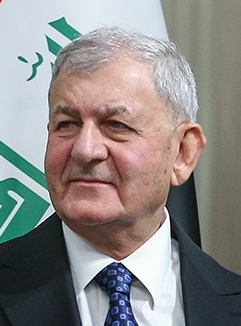

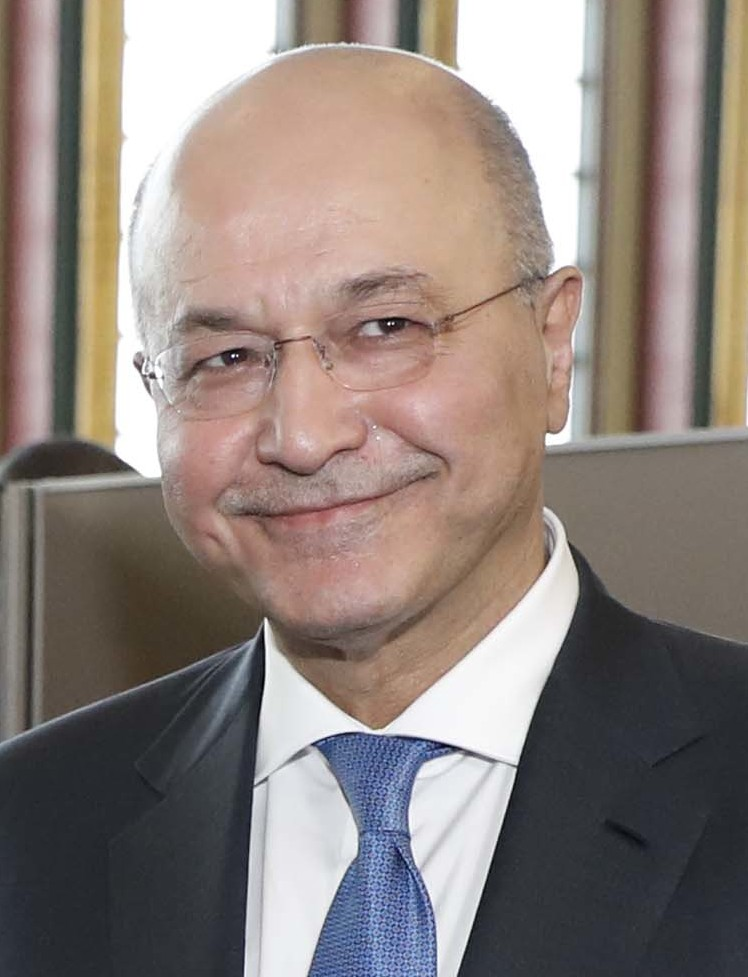
Nominee	Abdul Latif Rashid	Barham Salih
Party	PUK	PUK
Indirect vote	162	99
Percentage	62.07%	37.93%
President before election
Barham Salih
PUK
Elected president
Abdul Latif Rashid
PUK

The Iraqi presidential election of 2022 was held on 13 October 2022 to elect by indirect suffrage the president of Iraq for a four-year term. The position is largely ceremonial, with Iraq being a parliamentary system. Outgoing President Barham Salih was eligible for re-election, but was beaten in the second round by Abdul Latif Rashid.

== Process ==
With only two presidential candidates, initially scheduled for February 7, 2022, the vote was postponed due to the boycott of parliamentary sessions by the majority of deputies. They protested against the decision of the Supreme Court to rule out the candidacy of Hoshyar Zebari, who is supported by the main winning parties of the elections of October 2021.

Rescheduled to 26 March 2022, it was postponed again due to the quorum also not being met. On 30 March, it was postponed for a third time due to the quorum not being met once again. Then scheduled to be held on 6 April 2022, it failed due to the quorum not being met. Finally, the election was held on 13 October with quorum met.

Rashid was supported by Nouri al-Maliki, as well as the Coordination Framework. Kurdistan Democratic Party supported Rashid as a compromise candidate to block Salih. Rashid's own party, PUK didn't support him.

== Results ==
Results
Candidates	Parties	First round		Second round	
Candidates	Parties	Votes	%	Votes	%
Abdul Latif Rashid	PUK	157	61.33	162	62.07
Barham Salih	PUK	99	38.67	99	37.93
Required majority (Note: In the first round, a two-thirds majority of those registered is required, not a majority of the votes cast. In the second round, the election only requires obtaining the greatest number of votes between the two remaining candidates, i.e. the absolute majority of the votes cast.)		220 votes		50% of votes	
Valid votes		256	92.42	261	97.03
Blank and invalid votes		21	7.58	8	2.97
Total		277	100	269	100
Abstention		52	15.81	60	18.24
Registered voters / turnout		329	84.19	329	81.76
