= Sherri Kraham =

American businessman

- Born: Coral Springs, Florida
- Citizenship: US, Iraq
- Organization: SEED Foundation
- Spouse: Qubad Talabani
- Children: 2

Sherri Kraham is the president and executive director of the Kurdistan-based NGO, SEED Foundation, and the US-based SEED for Change, which support the social, educational and economic development of the Kurdistan Region of Iraq. SEED's focus is supporting survivors of violence and conflict in Kurdistan to recover and rebuild their lives. In Kurdistan and in the US, Sherri is an outspoken advocate for the most vulnerable including the displaced, women and children, and survivors of gender based violence.

Prior to moving to Kurdistan, Iraq in 2012, Sherri was a senior US government official, where she served from 1998 to 2012 in a range of capacities related to foreign policy, international development and foreign assistance programming.

From 2004 to 2012, she worked as the Deputy Vice President for Policy and Evaluation at the Millennium Challenge Corporation (MCC), a US government agency focused on economic growth programs in the poorest countries of the world. Prior to that position, she worked at the State Department from 1998 -2003, serving in Iraq under the Coalition Probivional Authority in 2003, for the Under Secretary, and four years as Iraq Desk Officer from 1998 to 2001. She has a bachelor's degree in political science from the Florida Atlantic University, and in 1999, Sherri received a Juris Doctor degree from George Mason University School of Law. She lives in Erbil, Kurdistan, with her husband Qubad Talabani, and their two children.
