= Asoz Latif Rashid =

Iraqi–British businessman

- Born: August 1982 (age 43–44)
- Occupation: Businessman
- Years active: 2000s–present
- Title: CEO of iQ Group
- Parents: Abdul Latif Rashid (father); Shanaz Ibrahim Ahmed (mother)

Asoz Latif Rashid (born August 1982) is an Iraqi–British businessman. He is the current CEO of iQ Group, an Iraqi technology and telecommunications company.

== Early life ==
Rashid was born in August 1982. He is the son of politician Abdul Latif Rashid, who later served as President of Iraq from 2022 to 2026.

== Career ==
Until 2009, Rashid served as Iraq's diplomatic delegate to the World Trade Organization (WTO) in Geneva, where he represented Iraq's interests in international trade discussions. After his diplomatic career, Rashid focused on business within multiple industries, including technology, finance, and infrastructure.

In 2012, he helped establish Crowd2Fund, a fintech platform based in the UK, regulated by the Financial Conduct Authority (FCA).

In 2020, Rashid became CEO of iQ Group, an Iraqi technology company founded in 2005. Under his leadership, iQ Group expanded its core services from fibre-optic internet provision to broader technological projects, focusing on digital innovation and infrastructure development. In April 2025, he appeared on Bloomberg News, where he explained the iQ Group's new "Silk Route" fibre-optic cable route, which he described as the first major Iraqi infrastructure project not connected with natural resources. The Silk Route Transit network connects Iraq to international submarine cable systems, providing a new terrestrial transit route between Europe and Asia.
