= Mukarram Talabani =

Iraqi Kurdish politician (1923–2025)

- مكرم الطالباني
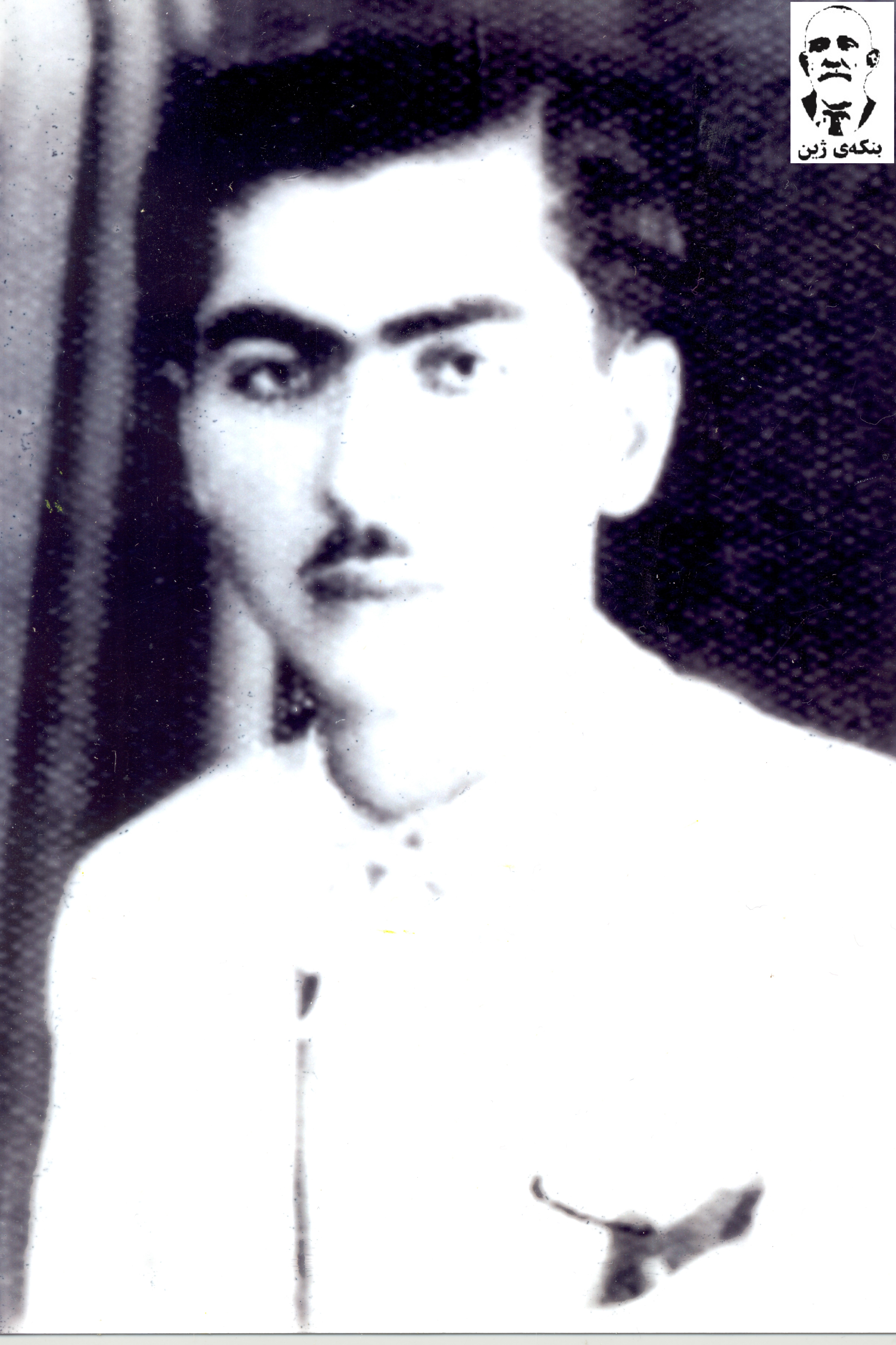
- Born: March or April 1923; Kirkuk, Iraq
- Died: 24 January 2025 (aged 101); Sulaymaniyah, Iraq
- Education: Law, Baghdad University
- Occupation: Politician
- Years active: 1946–2004
- Known for: Politician in Ba'athist Iraq, Minister of Irrigation, Minister of Transport

Mukarram Talabani (Kurdish: موکەڕەم تاڵەبانی, Arabic: مكرم الطالباني, romanized: Mukarram al-Ṭālbānī; March or April or May 1923 – 24 January 2025) was an Iraqi Kurdish politician and government minister in Ba'athist Iraq.

== Life and career ==
Talabani was born in Kirkuk in March or April 1923. After studying law in Baghdad, Talabani worked as a lawyer from 1946 onwards but was imprisoned from 1948 to 1955 and could only return to his work as an attorney after the overthrow of the Iraqi monarchy. Under the Iraqi government of Abd al-Karim Qasim, he became head of the state tobacco company in 1959 and later inspector of the Ministry of Agrarian Reform. Originally a supporter of the Kurdish Democratic Party (KDP), he later broke with KDP leader Mustafa Barzani in 1963, after helping to overthrow the Qasim regime in 1963. He then joined the Iraqi Communist Party (ICP) and became a member of its Central Committee.

When the ICP joined the Ba'athist-led National Progressive Front (NPF), Talabani became Iraq's Minister of Irrigation from 1972 to 1977 and then Iraq's Minister of Transport. With the departure of the Communists from the NPF, Talabani lost his position in 1978 but stayed in Baghdad until 2004. After that he moved to the Kurdish autonomous area in Iraq.

Talabani died on 24 January 2025, at the age of 101.
