= Ministry of Water Resources (Iraq) =

Government ministry of Iraq

Coordinates: 33.341°N 44.438°E

Republic of Iraq Ministry of Water Resources
- وزارة الموارد المائية
- Coat of arms of Iraq

Agency overview
- Jurisdiction: Government of Iraq
- Headquarters: Rusafa, Baghdad (Iraq)
- Agency executive: Muthanna al-Tamimi, Minister
- Website: Official website

The Ministry of Water Resources is a ministry within the government of Iraq. It is responsible for water management, including maintenance of the extensive system of irrigation canals and dams and other related tasks. Prior to the 2003 invasion of Iraq, the ministry was known as the Ministry of Irrigation and employed 12,000 Iraqis, as well as 6,000 contract employees. The ministry was divided into five separate commissions and eleven state-owned companies. This was eventually reduced by the Coalition Provisional Authority to six Directors General. The Ministry's budget was increased to 150 million United States dollars for 2004, compared to USD 1 million under the recent government of Saddam Hussein. It was also retasked with flooding the southern marshlands that had been ordered drained. On 10 May 2004, CPA administrator Paul Bremer declared the Ministry to be fully autonomous with Latif Rashid as its head at the time.
