= Hero Ibrahim Ahmed =

Former First Lady of Iraq

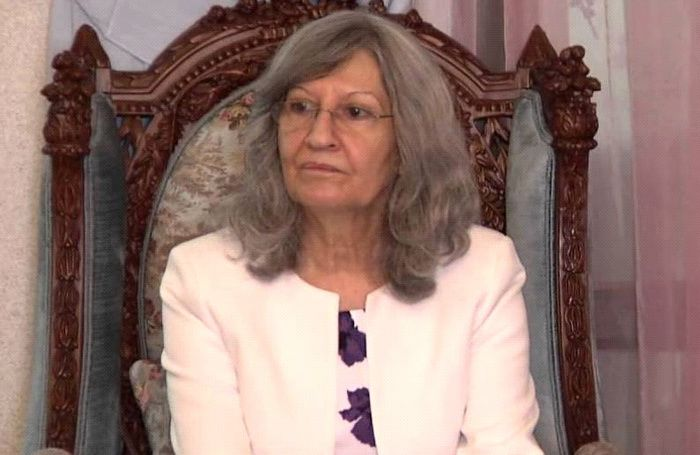

First Lady of Iraq
- In role 7 April 2005 – 24 July 2014
- Succeeded by: Rounak Abdul-Wahid Mustafa

Personal details
- Born: 12 June 1948 (age 78)
- Party: Patriotic Union of Kurdistan
- Spouse: Jalal Talabani (m. 1970; died 2017)
- Children: Bafil Talabani; Qubad Talabani
- Relatives: Shanaz Ibrahim Ahmed (sister); Abdul Latif Rashid (brother-in-law)

Hero Ibrahim Ahmed (Sorani Kurdish: ھێرۆ ئیبراھیم ئەحمەد; born 12 June 1948) is the former First Lady of Iraq from 2005 to 2014 and the widow of the former President of Iraq, Jalal Talabani.

== Early life ==
She was born on 12 June 1948 to an active political family that was struggling against Kurdish oppression in Iraq. Her father, Ibrahim Ahmad was imprisoned at Abu Graib in the 1950s which motivated her to follow politics. Her family was exiled to Kirkuk in 1954 and placed under house arrest until their return to Silemani in 1953. Upon returning her father was wounded in an assassination attempt.

Her family moved to Baghdad in 1958, where Hero pursued an education. She couldn't finish her education because of a military coup in Iraq which forced her family to flee to Iran, where she again resumed her education. In 1972, she graduated from Al-Mustansiriya University, Baghdad in Psychology, and gave birth to her eldest son Bafel then her second child Qubad.

== Career ==
Active in the media, she is the founder of one of the major Kurdish TV Channel - Kurdsat TV. She is a member and the de facto leader of the Patriotic Union of Kurdistan politburo after being elected in the PUK 3rd congress in June 2010.

Hero Ibrahim Ahmed actively promotes art and culture and has been instrumental in supporting the younger generation artists. Being a musician herself, Hero has supported several music projects, both for fund raising and for the media, and is committed to continuing her support in the future. Hero is also a women's right activist promoting music and art. She used the Kurdsat TV channel to launch multiple women awareness projects.

She is the director of the Kurdistan Save the Children (KSC) a charity organisation that aims to provide food, shelter and education for thousands of displaced orphans. She recognised that at that time a grassroots Kurdish organization was very much needed, as the involvement of local staff would ensure a better understanding of people's needs.

On 4 May 2008, while travelling to a cultural festival in Baghdad's National Theatre, a bomb exploded near her motorcade. Four of her bodyguards were injured, however Hero was not. It was unclear if Hero was the target of the bombing. This occurred on the same day as four U.S. marines were killed in Anbar Province by a roadside bomb.

Hero Ibrahim Ahmed is the sister of Shanaz Ibrahim Ahmed, wife of Iraqi President Abdul Latif Rashid.

Hero Ibrahim Ahmed also founded one of the most known school in Sulaymaniyah Shahid Jamal Tahir Girls Highschool.
