= Lahur Talabani =

Co-Leader, Patriotic Union of Kurdistan (born 1975)

- لاھور تاڵەبانی
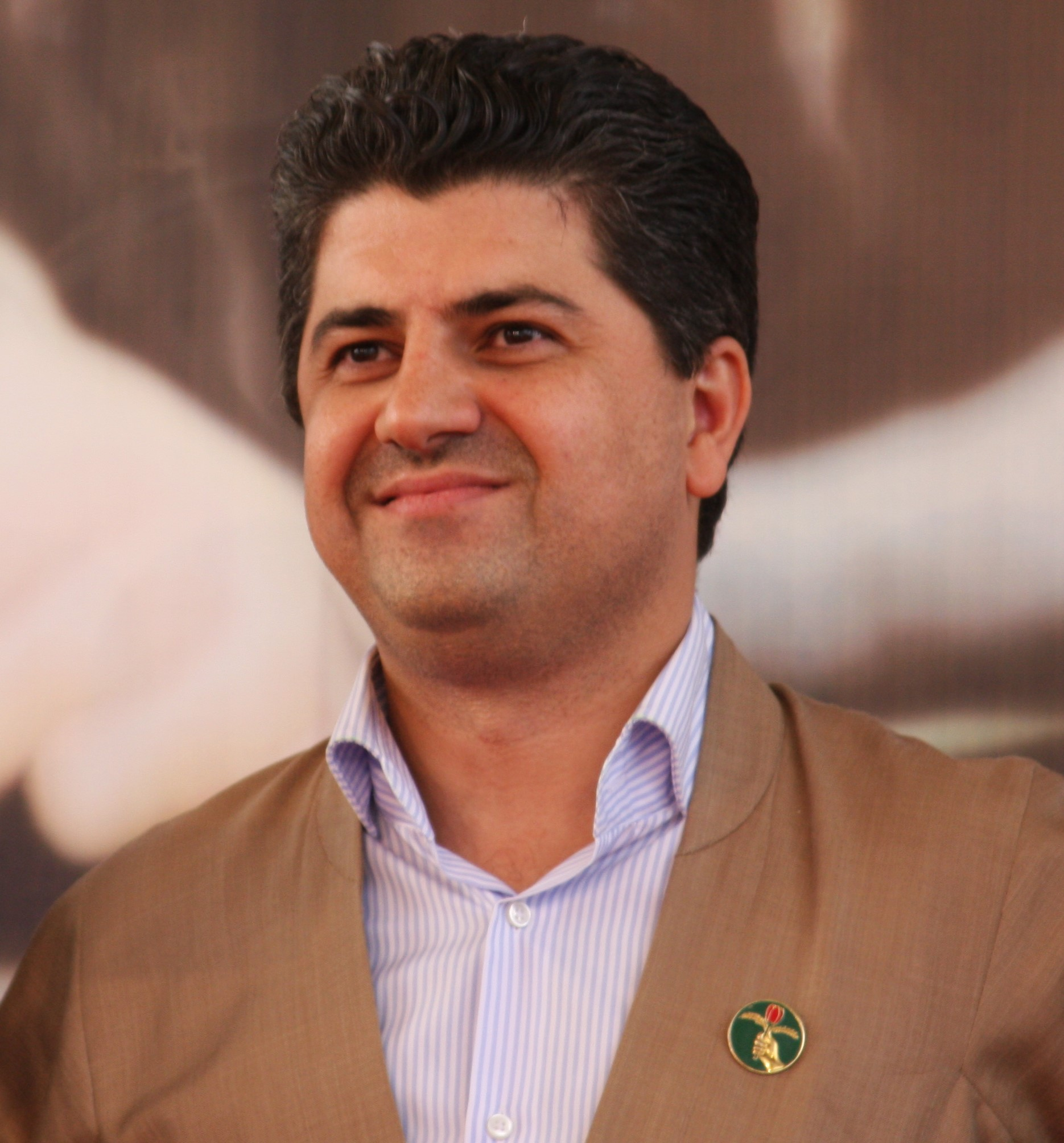
- Lahur Talabani in 2015

Leader of the People's Front
- Incumbent
- Assumed office 17 January 2024
- Preceded by: Office established

Leader of the Patriotic Union of Kurdistan
- In office February 2020 – July 2021 Serving with Bafel Talabani
- Preceded by: Kosrat Rasul Ali
- Succeeded by: Bafel Talabani

Director of the Zanyari Agency
- Incumbent
- Assumed office 2013

Director of the Counter Terrorism Group (CTG)
- In office 2002–2013

Personal details
- Born: 1975 (age 50–51) Koya, Iraq
- Citizenship: Iraqi; British
- Party: People's Front
- Other political affiliations: Patriotic Union of Kurdistan (1999-2021)
- Relatives: Jalal Talabani (uncle); Qubad Talabani (cousin); Bafel Talabani (cousin)
- Education: University of Greenwich
- Occupation: Politician, intelligence official

Lahur Talabani (Sorani Kurdish: لاهور تاڵەبانی; born 1975), also known as Lahur Sheikh Jangi Talabani (Kurdish: لاهور شێخ جەنگی تاڵەبانی), and more commonly as Sheikh Lahur, is an Iraqi intelligence official and politician who has been a leading figure in the fight against terror, especially against the Islamic State. He was Director of the Counter Terrorism Group (CTG) of the Patriotic Union of Kurdistan (PUK) from 2002 to 2013, Director of the Zanyarî Agency from 2013, and co-leader of the PUK from 2020 to 2021. When ousted from the PUK after losing a leadership battle, Lahur founded his own party, the People's Front, in 2024.

== Career highlights ==
=== 2003 – Operation Viking Hammer ===
In 2003, while director of the CTG, Talabani played a leading role in Operation Viking Hammer against the Ansar al-Islam terrorist organization, recognized as a major threat to Kurdistan's national security. The operation's success led to the permanent expulsion of Ansar al-Islam from the Kurdistan Region.

=== 2017 – Leadership battle in the PUK ===
In 2017, after the founder and leader of the Patriotic Union of Kurdistan, Jalal Talabani, died, a struggle for the leadership of the party ignited between Sheikh Lahur and Jalal's son Bafel Talabani. At the PUK's fourth congress in December 2019, Sheikh Lahur received the most votes for the General Leadership Council, and in a compromise, he and Bafel were proclaimed co-presidents.

In July 2021, Bafel Talabani accused Sheikh Lahur of poisoning him. Sheikh Lahur rejected the claims and called for a resolution of their leadership dispute within the leadership council of the PUK. Instead, Bafel shut down a media outlet close to Sheikh Lahur and ousted several important commanders from the counter-terrorism and intelligence units of the PUK, who were seen as affiliates of his opponent. Shortly after, Bafel was declared the sole leader of the party. In November, Sheikh Lahur was expelled from the PUK along with some others and Bafel took full control of the party's finances. Sheikh Lahur filed a lawsuit against the expulsion.

In February 2023, a court in Erbil ruled that the ouster of Sheikh Lahur from the co-presidency contradicted PUK's internal regulations and reinstated him. However, a day later on February 21 the judicial authority for Iraqi elections in Baghdad declared Bafel Talabani the sole leader of the PUK.

=== 2024 – Founding the People's Front ===
After his ousting from the PUK, Sheikh Lahur proceeded to work on founding his own party, the People's Front, with his new party receiving its license from the interior ministry on 17 January 2024. Several former members of Sheikh Lahur's wing of the PUK also joined him in the People's Front.

=== 2025 – Sulaymaniyah clashes ===
On 22 August 2025, security forces in the autonomous Kurdistan Region of Iraq carried out an overnight operation in Sulaymaniyah to arrest Sheikh Lahur, then leader of the opposition People’s Front party. The operation followed an arrest warrant being issued under Article 406 of the Iraqi Penal Code, which relates to premeditated murder.

At around 4:10 a.m. local time, armed clashes broke out between Sheikh Lahur’s supporters and security personnel at the Lalezar Hotel, where he was staying, with the fighting lasting several hours before Sheikh Lahur surrendered. His brother, Polad (also Bolad) Sheikh Jangi, was injured in the leg during the clashes and was also taken into custody. According to officials, the clashes resulted in the deaths of three members of the security forces and injuries to at least 19 others. Local media reported that among those killed were Diyar Sardar Hakim, a Peshmerga commando, and Ari Sheikh Suad Talabani of the Counter-Terrorism Group.

Following the incident, Kurdistan Region Prime Minister Masrour Barzani and Sulaymaniyah Governor Haval Abubakir called for restraint, urging all parties to avoid further escalation in order to preserve stability in the region.

=== Present-day ===
Sheikh Lahur is an ally of the United States and the West, and continues to be an influential and crucial figure in the security and political concerns of both the Middle East and the wider region. In addition to having strong relations with key figures in Iraq, Sheikh Lahur also maintains good relations with other prominent Arab leaders and influential Western and Middle Eastern states. With the support of the US 10th Special Forces Group and the Central Intelligence Agency, he continues to play an integral role in the fight against terrorism.

== Personal life ==
Sheikh Lahur is married and has two sons and a daughter. He has five brothers and two sisters, and is the nephew of Celal Talebanî. Fluent in Kurdish, English, Turkish, Arabic, and Persian, Sheikh Lahur has a strong interest in ancient history and enjoys painting. He is an avid football fan and supports Liverpool F.C.
