= IQ Group =

Telecommunications company

iQ Group
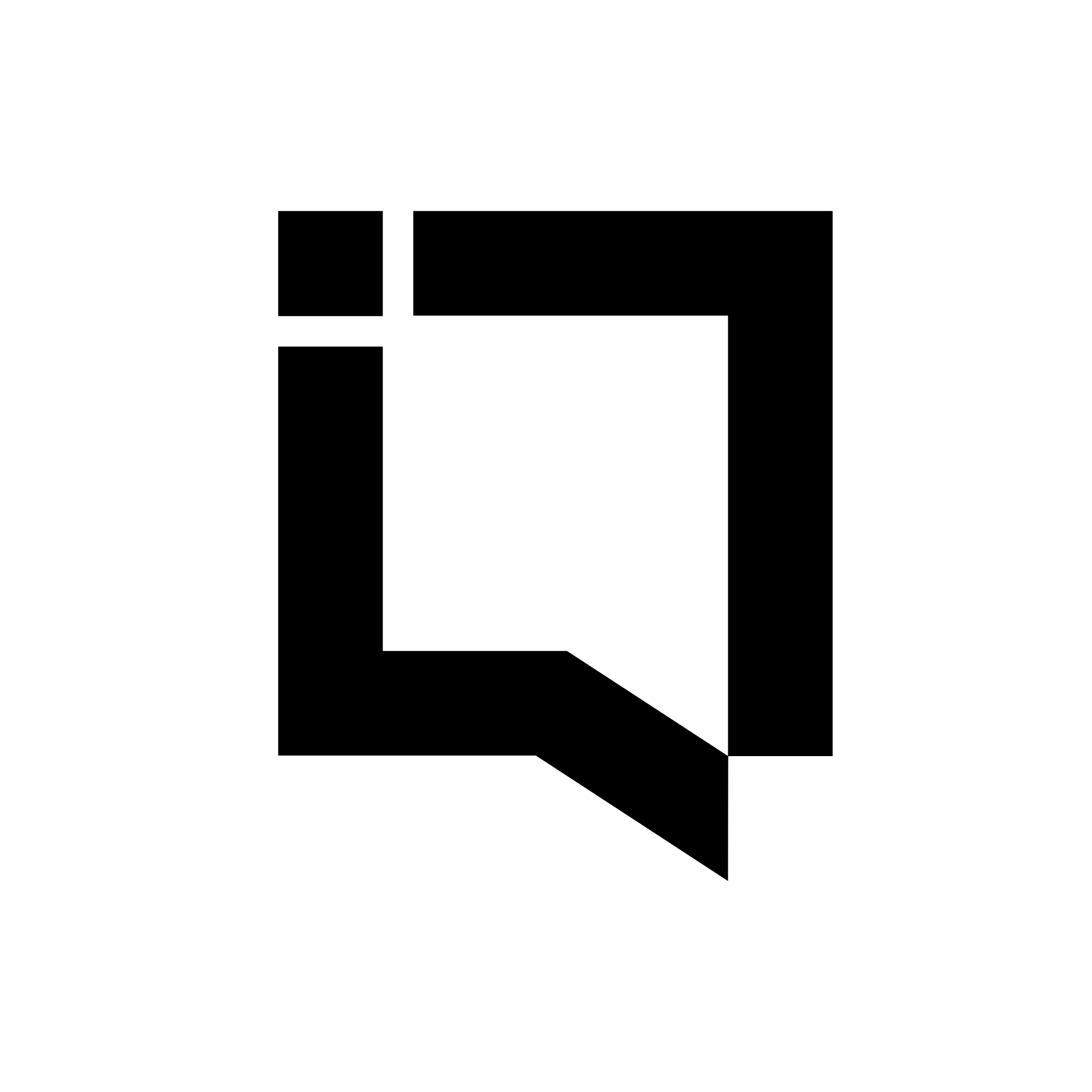
- Company type: Telecommunications
- Founded: 2005
- Area served: Middle East
- Key people: Asoz Latif Rashid (CEO)
- Website: iq.group

iQ Group (also known as iQ) is an Iraqi technology conglomerate founded in 2005. The company was initially established as a fibre-optic internet service provider in Sulaymaniyah, Iraq.

== History ==
Founded in 2005, iQ began by building fibre-optic topology and cable routes across the country to be able to provide internet services in Iraq. IQ Group provides fibre-optic broadband services and wholesales capacity services to a range of customers, including businesses, NGOs, schools, hospitals. In 2020, with the arrival of the new CEO, Asoz Latif Rashid, iQ group began to work in new areas. In 2023, it launched a partnership with Tencent.

== Transit connectivity ==
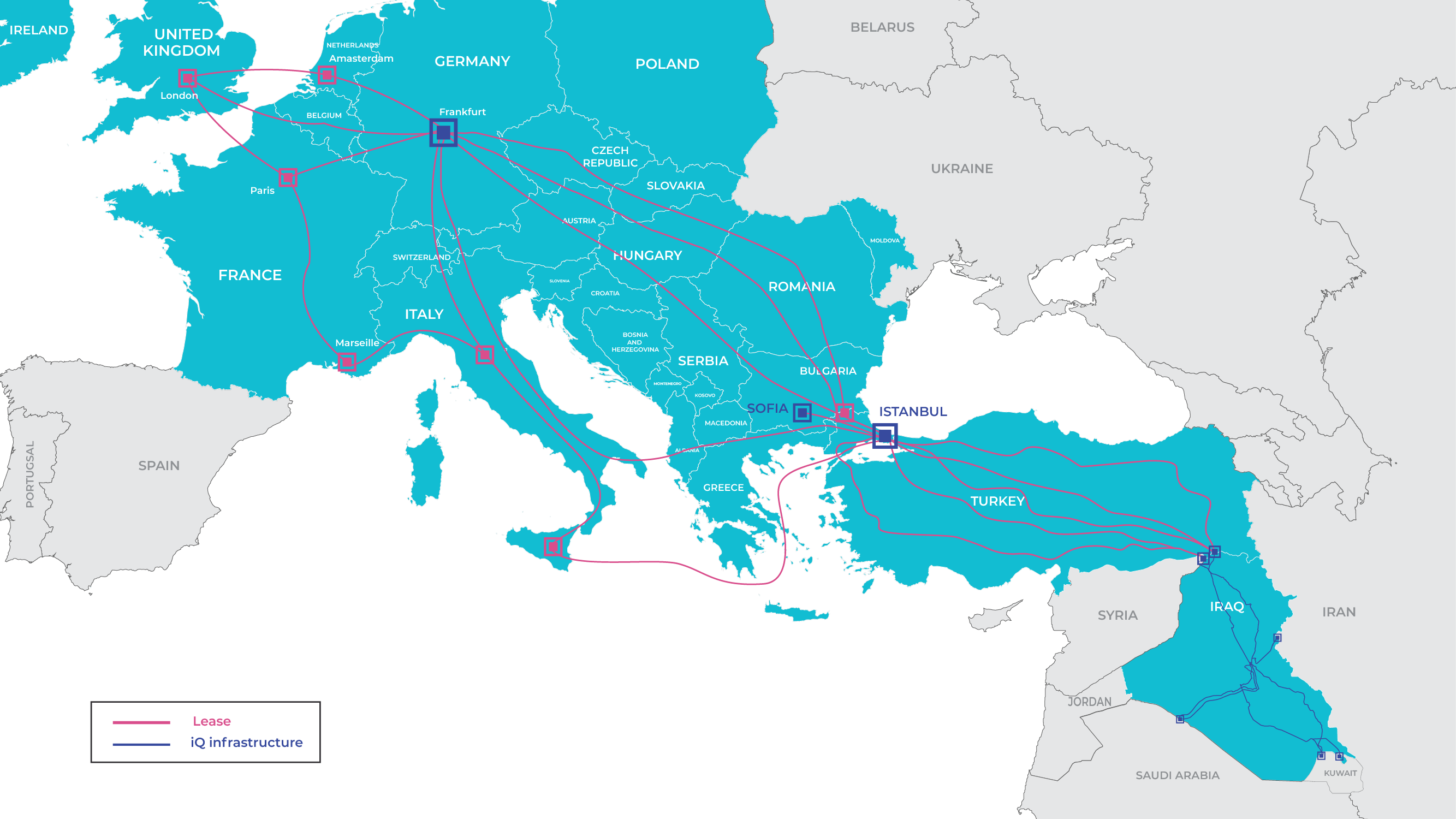
IQ Group Silk Route transit map

IQ Group's Silk Route Transit is a terrestrial fibre-optic infrastructure IP-Transit project that provides an alternative route to connect Europe and the Middle East.

Conceptualised in 2010, the Silk Route Transit consists of over 3500 kilometers of fiber-optic cable laid across Iraq. Its multilayer fiber-optic network supposedly provides the shortest alternative terrestrial route to connect Europe to Asia.
