= Ibrahim Ahmad =

Iraqi Kurdish writer, novelist and translator (1914–2000)

Ibrahim Ahmed
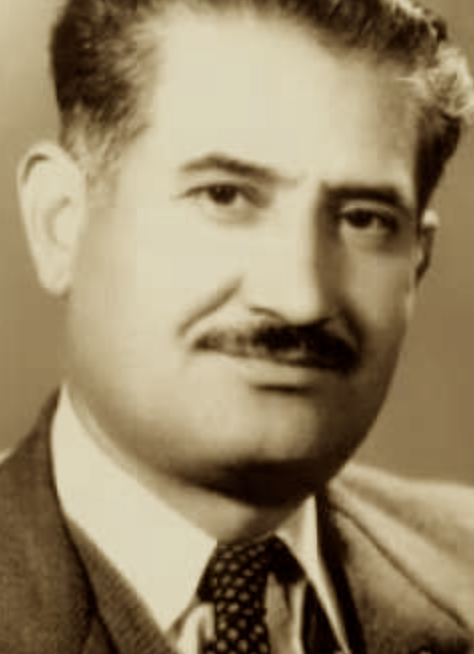
- Born: 6 March 1914; Sulaimaniyah, Ottoman Empire
- Died: 8 April 2000 (aged 86); London, England
- Office: Founder of the PUK PDK
- Political party: Patriotic Union of Kurdistan
- Children: Hero Ibrahim Ahmed; Shanaz Ibrahim Ahmed

Ibrahim Ahmad (6 March 1914 – 8 April 2000) (alternatively spelt Ibrahim Ahmed or Ibrahîm Ehmed) (Kurmanji Kurdish: Ibrahîm Ehmed, Sorani Kurdish: ئیبراهیم ئه‌حمه‌د) was an Iraqi Kurdish writer, novelist, jurist and translator who founded the Patriotic Union of Kurdistan in 1975. He is the father-in-law of former President Jalal Talabani and current President Abdul Latif Rashid through both of his daughters, Hero Ibrahim Ahmed and Shanaz Ibrahim Ahmed.

== Biography ==
Ibrahim Ahmad was born to a Kurdish family in Sulaymaniyah in the Ottoman Empire in the Dargazen Neighborhood and studied Law at the University of Baghdad, graduating in 1937. From 1942 to 1944, he served as a judge in the cities of Irbil and Halabja. In 1939, he, along with Alaaddin Sajadi, founded the Kurdish literary periodical Gelawêj. He acted as the publisher and the Editor in Chief of that journal. Gelawêj was published until 1949. It was during this period that he became involved in politics.

In 1944 he became the head of the local branch of Komeley Jiyanewey Kurd (J.K.) in Sulaymaniyah. Subsequently, this branch evolved to serve the entirety of Southern Kurdistan. When the J.K. changed its name on 16 July 1945, to the Kurdistan Democratic Party (K.D.P.), Ibrahim Ahmad became its chairman in Iraqi Kurdistan. This branch of the K.D.P. published a magazine titled Dengî Rastî with Ibrahim Ahmad as editor. After 1947, he became an active member of the Kurdistan Democratic Party, and rose to the role of Secretary General of the party in 1953. In 1949, he was sentenced by a special Iraqi court, established by the royalist regime, to two years of prison in Baghdad, and two years of local arrest in Kirkuk. From 1949 to 1956, he served as the editor of the K.D.P's newspaper, Rizgarî. The party's newspaper was renamed to Xebat in 1956 with Ibrahim Ahmed as the editor. In 1964, a political division occurred among the ranks of K.D.P., with Ahmad on one side and Mustafa Barzani on the other. This division lead to the formation of Patriotic Union of Kurdistan in 1975. After 1975, Ibrahim Ahmed emigrated to Britain as a political refugee. Ibrahim Ahmed started writing novels in Kurdish in 1933. This was an important milestone in Kurdish literature. His most important novel is Janî Gel. It was written in 1956 and is about the Kurdish war of independence, with a nod to the Kurdish situation. When selecting this title, Ibrahim Ahmed was playing on the double meaning of the Kurdish phrase which can mean the agony of giving birth to a child as well as the agony of giving birth to a people or a nation. It was translated into Persian and published in Iran in 1980, and into Turkish and French in 1994.

== Works ==
=== Short stories ===
Ahmad's short stories, articles and poems were published in three different magazines: Gelawêj, Hawar and Jiyan. He has also published many books.

1. Yadgarî Lawan (Memories of youth), Collection of poem and stories, Baghdad, 1933.
2. Kwêrewerî (Misery), Collection of short stories, Baghdad, 1959.
3. Bawik û Kur (Father and son), short story, published in the magazine Çirîkey Kurdistan, England, 1979.
4. Pirsey Şehîd (The vigil of martyr), short story, published in the magazine Çirîkey Kurdistan, England, 1980.

=== Novels ===
1. Janî Gel (The suffering of the people), Novel, 1972, Iraq.
2. Dirk û Gul (The thorn and the flower), in two volumes, 1991. (written in 1961)
3. Awat û Nahumêdî (Expectations and Desperation), written in 1933, not been published yet.
4. Herzekarî û Hejarî (Negligence and Poverty), written in 1972, unpublished.
5. Jiyan û Xebat (Life and Struggle), written in 1961, unpublished.

=== Articles ===
1. Ibrahim Ahmad, The Republic of Kurdistan: A Personal Memoir, in the International Journal of Kurdish Studies, Vol.11, Nos.1-2, 1997, p. 19.

== See also ==
- List of Kurdish scholars
