= Jalal Talabani =

President of Iraq from 2006 to 2014

- جەلال تاڵەبانی جلال طالباني
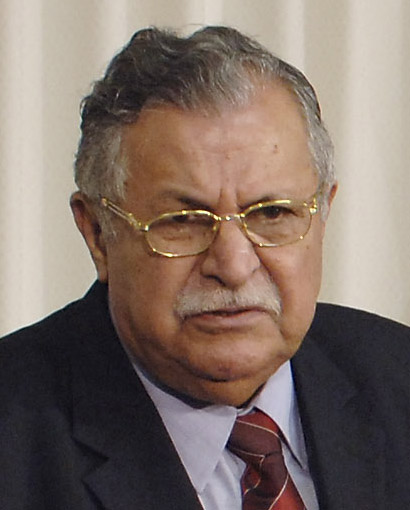
- Talabani in 2005

6th President of Iraq
- In office 7 April 2005 – 24 July 2014
- Prime Minister: Ayad Allawi; Ibrahim al-Jaafari; Nouri al-Maliki
- Vice President: Adil Abdul-Mahdi; Ghazi Mashal Ajil al-Yawer; Tariq al-Hashimi; Khodair al-Khozaei
- Preceded by: Saddam Hussein (1979–2003); Ghazi Mashal Ajil al-Yawer (acting)
- Succeeded by: Fuad Masum

President of the Governing Council of Iraq
- In office 1 November 2003 – 30 November 2003
- Preceded by: Ayad Allawi
- Succeeded by: Abdul Aziz al-Hakim

Leader of the Patriotic Union of Kurdistan
- In office 1 April 1975 – 3 October 2017
- Preceded by: Position established
- Succeeded by: Kosrat Rasul Ali

Personal details
- Born: Jalal Husamuddin Talabani; 1933 Kelkan, Kingdom of Iraq
- Died: 3 October 2017 (aged 83–84) Berlin, Germany
- Cause of death: Cerebral hemorrhage
- Resting place: Dabashan, Sulaymaniyah
- Party: KDP (1947–1975); PUK (from 1975)
- Spouse: Hero Ibrahim Ahmed (m. 1970)
- Children: Bafel; Qubad
- Education: University of Baghdad

Jalal Talabani (Kurdish: جەلال تاڵەبانی, romanized: Celal Talebanî, Arabic: جلال طالباني, romanized: Jalāl Ṭālabānī; 1933 – 3 October 2017) was an Iraqi Kurdish politician who served as the 6th president of Iraq from 2005 to 2014, as well as the president of the Governing Council of Iraq.

Talabani was the founder and secretary-general of one of the main Kurdish political parties, the Patriotic Union of Kurdistan (PUK). He was a prominent member of the Interim Iraq Governing Council, which was established following the overthrow of Saddam Hussein in the 2003 invasion of Iraq. Talabani was an advocate for Kurdish rights and democracy in Iraq for more than 50 years.

== Early life ==
Talabani was born in Kelkan village, and his father was Sheikh Husameddin Nurullah, from the Talabani branch of the Zangana tribe, while his mother was from the Mangur tribe. He belonged to the Koy Sanjaq branch of the Talabani family, which earlier produced many leading social figures including the poet Riza Talabani, and former National Democratic Party member Hasan Talabani and Mukarram Talabani, a prominent member of the Communist party.

Talabani received his elementary and intermediate school education in Koy Sanjaq and his high school education in Erbil and Kirkuk. When he was in his teens, Talabani's peers began referring to him as "Mam" Jalal, with "mam" meaning "paternal uncle" in Kurdish; he was subsequently addressed by Kurds as such. In 1953, he began to study law at the Baghdad University. He had to flee into exile in Syria in 1956, in order to prevent an arrest for being involved in activities of the Kurdish Students Union. Residing in Damascus, he was involved in the establishment the Kurdistan Democratic Party of Syria (KDPS). He later returned to Iraq and gained a degree in 1959.

== Career ==
=== Rights for Kurds ===
After completing his studies at the Baghdad University, he entered the Iraqi Army, where he served shortly as a tank unit commander. In the early 1960s, he was made the head of the Polit bureau of the Kurdistan Democratic Party (KDP). When in September 1961, the Kurdish uprising for the rights of the Kurds in northern Iraq was declared against the Baghdad government of Abd al-Karim Qasim, Talabani took charge of the Kirkuk and Silemani battlefronts and organized and led separatist movements in Mawat, Rezan and the Qaradagh regions.

In March 1962, he led a coordinated Peshmerga offensive that brought about the liberation of the district of Sharbazher from Iraqi government forces. When not engaged in fighting in the early and mid-1960s, Talabani undertook numerous diplomatic missions, representing the Kurdish leadership at meetings in Europe and the Middle East. In 1964, he and the Barzani family had a dispute over the direction of the KDP and Talabani left Iraq and settled in Iran. In Iran he purchased weapons without the knowledge of the Barzanis, following which he was expelled from the KDP in summer 1964.

After the March 1970 agreement between the Iraqi government and the Kurdish rebels, Talabani returned to Iraqi Kurdistan, and rejoined the KDP, even though he wouldn't hold an office at the time. The Kurdish separatist movement collapsed in March 1975, after Iran ended their support in exchange for a border agreement with Iraq. This agreement was the 1975 Algiers Agreement, where Iraq gave up claims to the Shatt al-Arab (Arvand Rūd) waterway and Khuzestan, which later became the basis for the Iran–Iraq War. Believing it was time to give a new direction to the Kurdish separatists and to the Kurdish society, Talabani, with a group of Kurdish intellectuals and activists, founded the Kurdish Patriotic Union of Kurdistan (Yekiaiti Nishtimani Kurdistan) in 1975.

In 1976, he began organizing an armed campaign for Kurdish independence inside Iraqi Kurdistan. From 1977 onwards, he established the PUK base within Iranian Kurdistan in Nawkhan and another one in Iraqi Kurdistan in Qandil. During the 1980s, Talabani sided with Iran and led a Kurdish struggle from bases inside Iraq until the crackdown against Kurdish separatists from 1987 to 1988. Following the invasion of Kuwait by Iraq in August 1990, he travelled to the United States, in order to offer his services and troops to the United States and raise support for the PUK. But his attempts did not bear the success he expected at the time.

In 1991, he helped inspire a renewed effort for Kurdish independence. He negotiated a ceasefire with the Iraqi Ba'athist government that saved the lives of many Kurds and worked closely with the United States, United Kingdom, France and other countries to set up the safe haven in Iraqi Kurdistan. In 1992 the Kurdistan Regional Government was founded. He was also supportive of peace negotiations between the Kurdistan Workers' Party and Turkey, and was also present as Abdullah Öcalan announced the ceasefire of the PKK on 17 March and prolonged it indefinitely on 16 April 1993. He was given a Turkish passport by the then-president Turgut Özal in 1992 in order to help Talabani travel freely. He returned the passport in 2003.

Talabani pursued a negotiated settlement to the Iraqi Kurdish Civil War, as well as the larger issue of Kurdish rights in the current regional context. He worked closely with other Kurdish politicians as well as the rest of the Iraqi opposition factions. In close coordination with Masoud Barzani, Talabani and the Kurds played a key role as a partner of the U.S. led Coalition in the invasion of Iraq.

Talabani was a member of the Iraqi Governing Council which negotiated the Transitional Administrative Law (TAL), Iraq's interim constitution. The TAL governed all politics in Iraq and the process of writing and adopting the final constitution.

=== Presidency ===
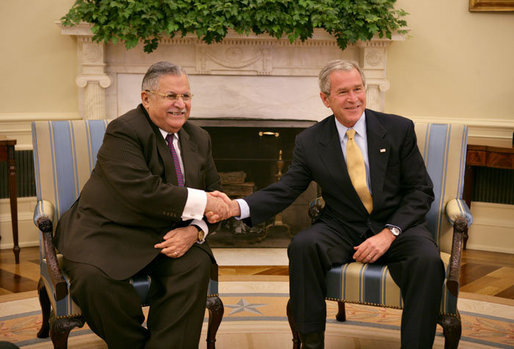
Talabani with U.S. President George W. Bush on 2 October 2007

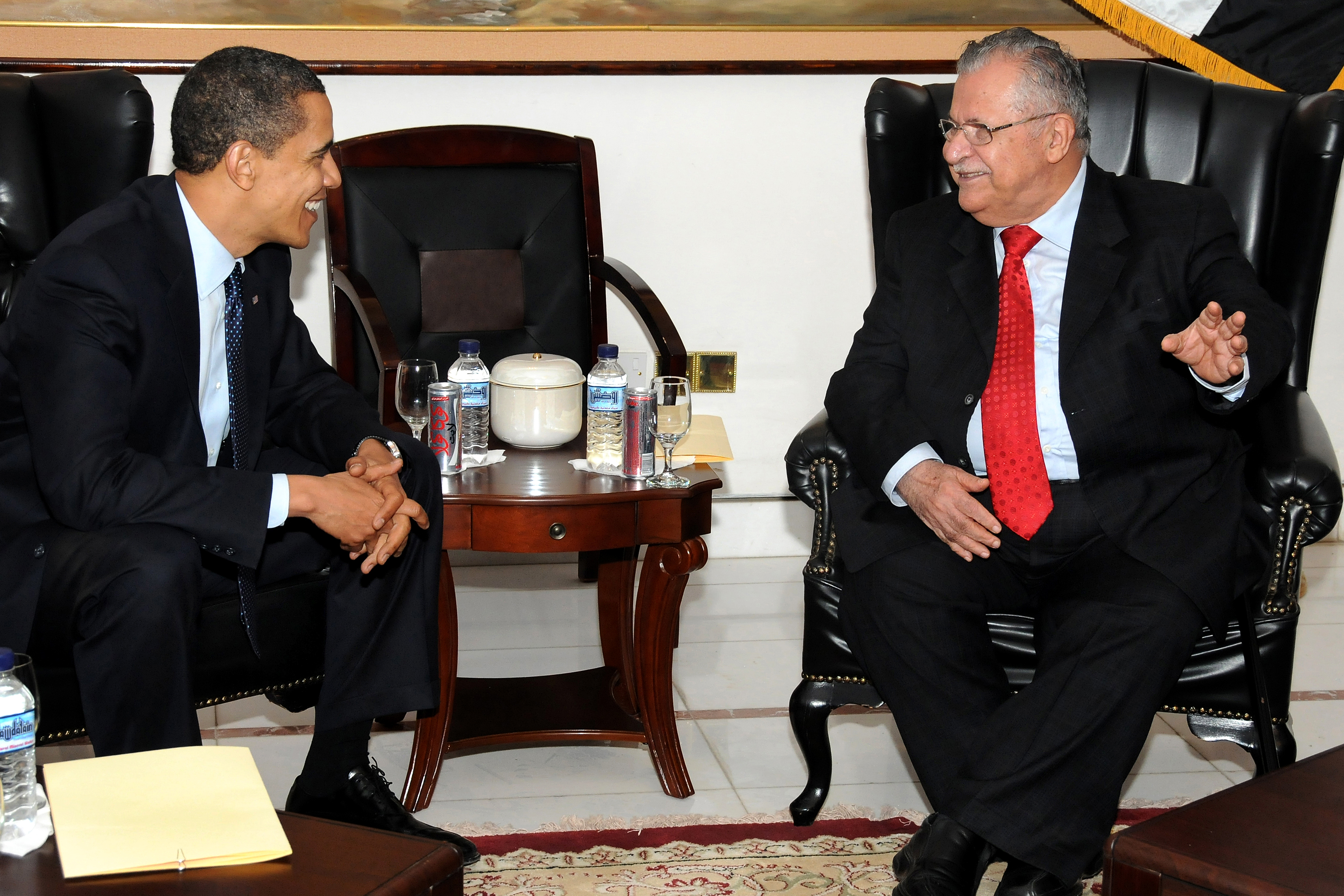
Jalal Talabani with U.S. President Barack Obama during a visit to Camp Victory, Iraq, 7 April 2009.

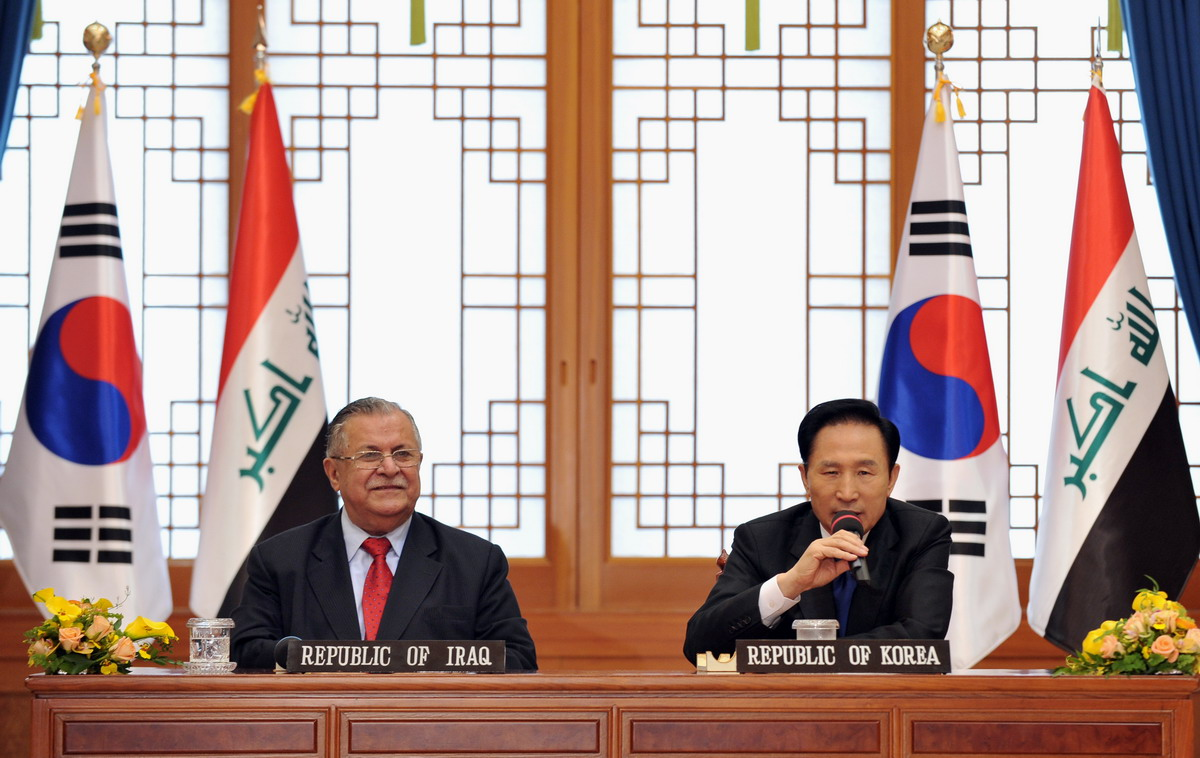
Talabani with South Korean president Lee Myung-bak, February 2009

Talabani was elected President of Iraq on 6 April 2005, by the Iraqi National Assembly and sworn into office the following day.

On 22 April 2006, Talabani began his second term as President of Iraq, becoming the first President elected under the country's new constitution. His office was part of the Presidency Council of Iraq. Nawshirwan Mustafa was Talabani's deputy until Mustafa resigned in 2006 and formed an opposition party called Gorran.

He supported Barzani's extended presidency of the Kurdistan Region post-2013.

== Health and death ==
On 18 December 2012, Talabani suffered a stroke and was in intensive care in Baghdad, where his condition eventually stabilized after reports that he was in a coma. A statement on the President's official website said that he was being treated for blocked arteries. On 20 December, Talabani's condition had improved enough to allow travel to Germany for treatment. The head of Talabani's medical team in Iraq had been Governor Najmiddin Karim. On 19 July 2014, Jalal Talabani returned to Iraq after more than 18 months of medical treatment. Due to his absence from politics, as a result of his illness, the PUK became consumed by a succession crisis.

Jalal Talabani died on 3 October 2017, at the age of 83 in Berlin, Germany of a cerebral hemorrhage, due to the complications caused by the stroke he suffered five years prior in 2012. He died a few days after the referendum about the independence of Iraqi Kurdistan was approved by the voters. Masoud Barzani, President of Kurdistan Regional Government and for years his Kurdish rival, announced seven days of mourning in Iraqi Kurdistan in memory of Talabani. Iraqi Prime Minister Haider al-Abadi also announced three days of mourning in the country. His state funeral was held on 6 October 2017. Millions turned out across the cities and memorials were held across the globe.

== Personal life ==
Talabani was married to Hero Ibrahim Ahmed, daughter of Ibrahim Ahmad. They had two sons, Bafel and Qubad. Qubad is the deputy prime minister of the Kurdistan Regional Government in Erbil since 2014. His nephew is Lahur Talabani.

Party political offices
New office	Leader of the Patriotic Union of Kurdistan; 1975–2017	Succeeded by Kosrat Rasul Ali; Acting
Political offices
Preceded by Ayad Allawi	President of the Governing Council of Iraq; 2003	Succeeded by Abdul Aziz al-Hakim
Preceded by Ghazi Mashal Ajil al-Yawer; Acting	President of Iraq; 2006–2014	Succeeded by Fuad Masum
