= Patriotic Union of Kurdistan =

Political party in the Kurdistan Region

Patriotic Union of Kurdistan Kurdish: Yekêtîy Nîştimanîy Kurdistan Sorani Kurdish: یەکێتیی نيشتمانیی کوردستان Arabic: الاتحاد الوطني الكردستاني
- Leader: Bafel Talabani
- President: Bafel Talabani
- Spokesperson: Karwan Gaznayi
- Founded: 1 June 1975; 51 years ago
- Headquarters: Sulaymaniyah, Kurdistan Region, Iraq
- Ideology: Kurdish nationalism; Left-wing nationalism; Regionalism; Secularism; Social democracy; Socialism; Factions: Marxism
- Political position: Centre-left to left-wing
- National affiliation: Kurdistani Coalition
- International affiliation: Socialist International; Progressive Alliance
- Colours: Medium sea green
- Council of Representatives of Iraq: 15 / 329
- Kurdistan Region Parliament: 23 / 100

Party flag

Website
- www.pukmedia.com

PUK Peshmerga
- پێشمەرگەی یەکێتی
- Flag of Kurdistan, commonly used by Kurdish forces
- Active: 1975–present
- Country: Kurdistan Region, Iraq
- Allegiance: Patriotic Union of Kurdistan
- Branch: Peshmerga
- Type: Infantry
- Role: Ground warfare, regional defense
- Size: Estimated 110,000+ (2025)
- Part of: Ministry of Peshmerga Affairs (nominally)
- Garrison/HQ: Sulaymaniyah
- Nickname: Green Peshmerga
- Colors: Green
- Engagements: PUK insurgency; 1983–1986 Kurdish rebellions in Iraq; Iran–Iraq War; Gulf War; Kurdish Civil War; Iraqi Kurdistan conflict (2001–2003); 2003 invasion of Iraq; Iraqi Civil War (2014–2017); War against the Islamic State

Commanders
- Notable commanders: Jalal Talabani; Kosrat Rasul Ali; Nawshirwan Mustafa

The Patriotic Union of Kurdistan (PUK; Kurdish: یەکێتیی نیشتمانیی کوردستان, romanized: Yekêtîy Nîştimanîy Kurdistan) is a centre-left regionalist political party active in Kurdistan Region and the disputed territories in Iraq. The PUK describes its goals as self-determination, human rights, democracy and peace for the Kurdish people of Kurdistan and Iraq. The PUK is currently under the leadership of Bafel Talabani. The PUK was founded in 1975 by Adel Murad, Jalal Talabani, Nawshirwan Mustafa, Fuad Masum, Ali Askari and Abdul Razaq Feyli Dawood Mohammed Ali.

== History ==
=== Discontent within the Kurdistan Democratic Party (KDP) ===
The PUK traces its political heritage to Sulaymaniyah native Ibrahim Ahmad. After the collapse of the Soviet-backed Kurdish Mahabad Republic in early 1947, Ibrahim Ahmad, previously the Sulaymaniyah representative of the Iranian KDP (KDP-I), joined the newly formed Iraqi KDP. Ahmad was a highly influential leftist intellectual, who by 1951 had succeeded in rallying most of the Iraqi Kurdish leftist-nationalists to the new Iraqi KDP, which, in turn, took the opportunity to convene a second Party Congress and duly elect Ahmad as secretary-general (effectively acting Chairman).

However, from the very beginning in Iran, Ibrahim Ahmad's leftist politics, "intellectualism", and support for Qazi Muhammad put him at odds with the faction of the KDP loyal to Mustafa Barzani and his traditionalist-conservative tribal support base. It was "well-known in nationalist circles that the relations between the two men Mustafa and Qazi were not easy". Ibrahim Ahmad was soon joined by up-and-coming intellectual and socialist Jalal Talabani. Barzani and Ahmad were known to dislike each other. But while each wanted to reduce the others' influence in the KDP, each also knew that the other was indispensable in securing the loyalty of their respective support-bases.

When the first Ba'ath Party government was deposed in a coup led by Abdul Salam Arif, Mustafa developed a close relationship with Arif. Mulla Mustafa signed an agreement with Arif in his personal capacity, rather than as president of the KDP. This infuriated Ahmad and Jalal Talabani as the agreement omitted any mention of self-administration, let alone autonomy—the whole point for which the Kurds had been fighting a long-term guerrilla war. Arif threatened force against any Kurdish opponent of Mustafa, while Mustafa declared that any resistance to Baghdad would constitute a declaration of war against himself and the Barzanis.

Ibrahim Ahmad and Jalal Talabani decried what they saw as complicity and even submission to Baghdad. Mulla Mustafa rallied the conservatives and tribal leaders to his side. Furious debates and campaigning followed, but Ahmad's and Talabani's arguments could not dislodge Mulla Mustafa's position as the popular figurehead of the Kurdish people. Mulla Mustafa would accept no dissent, and, fearing for their lives, Ahmad and his followers slipped away at night from a heated discussion with Mulla Mustafa, and retreated back to their stronghold in Mawat, Iraq.

At the Sixth Party Congress of the KDP in July 1964, representatives from the Ahmad-Talabani faction were arrested upon arrival. A few days later Mulla Mustafa sent his son, Idris Barzani with a large force to drive Ahmad, Talabani, and their 4,000 or so followers into exile in Iran. With this, Mulla Mustafa had finally achieved undisputed control of the KDP.

=== Founding ===
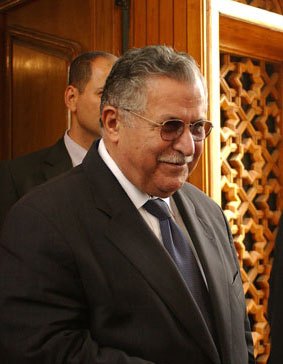
Jalal Talabani, the former leader of the PUK and president of Iraq.

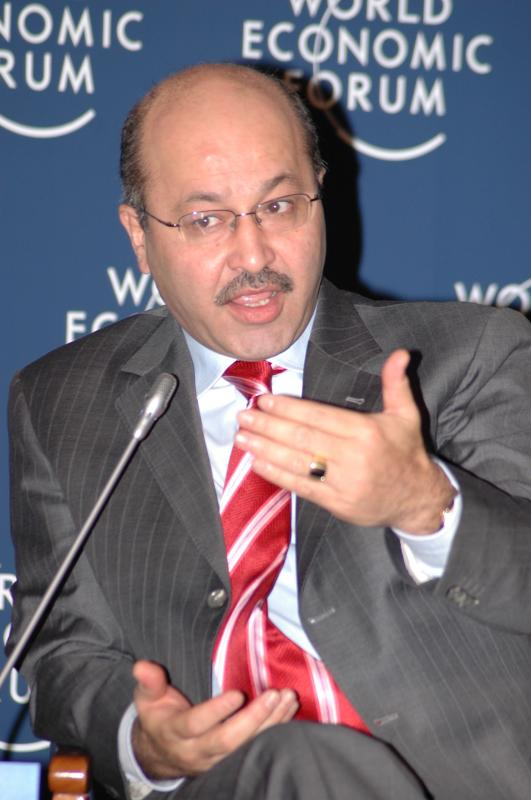
Barham Salih, the second deputy secretary-general of the PUK and former president of Iraq.

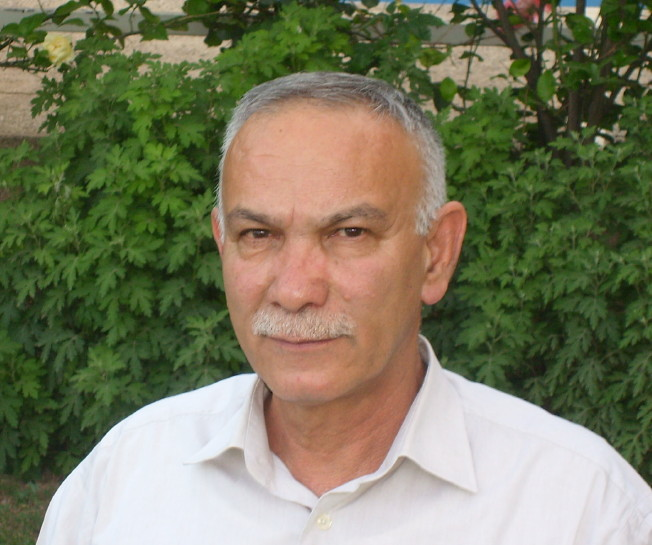
Nawshirwan Mustafa, the former deputy secretary-general of the PUK.

After the defeat of the Kurds in the 1974–1975 Revolt, on 22 May 1975, Talabani met in a coffee shop called Gligla, in Aum Rmana, Damascus, with Adel Murad, Fuad Mausm, and Abdul Razaq Faily. That day, the PUK announced its formation via Syrian and Lebanese media. The day after, Talabani visited Berlin in West Germany and met three other co-founders, Nawshirwan Mustafa, Omar Shekhmus, and Kamal Fuad, and some other activists. On 1 June 1975, the PUK was announced again in Berlin, and thus it was decided that 1 June is the anniversary date of the founding of the Patriotic Union of Kurdistan (PUK).

The PUK was a coalition of at least five separate political entities, the most significant of which were Talabani and his closest followers, Nawshirwan Mustafa's clandestine Marxist-Leninist group Komala, and the Kurdistan Socialist Movement (KSM), formed as a result of a series of meetings within the cadres of the Aylul Revolution who took refuge in Iran in 1975, including Omer Dababa, Ali Askari, Dr. Khalid, Ali Hazhar, Kardo Galali, Ibrahim Ahmad, Jamal Agha, Rasul Mamand, Mala Nasih, Abdulrahman Gomashini, Milazm Tahir, Ali Wali and Kamal Mihedeen. The PUK served as an umbrella organization unifying various trends within the Kurdish political movement in Iraq.

The PUK received grassroots support from the urban intellectual classes of Iraqi Kurdistan upon its establishment, partly due to five of its seven founding members being Ph.D. holders and academics. In the early 1980s, the PUK evolved and broadened its appeal to all sections of Iraqi Kurdish society, especially the rural classes.

In 1992, the constituent groups within the PUK merged into a unified political movement that affirmed its social-democratic identity and affiliation. Their communique ascribed the collapse of the revolt to "the inability of the feudalist, tribalist, bourgeois rightist and capitulationist Kurdish leadership".

The PUK's support lies predominantly in the southern part of the Kurdistan Region.

=== Conflicts ===
During the Iran-Iraq war, the PUK entered into hostilities with the Iranian Kurdish Sipay Rizgari, opposing them due to Sipay Rizgari's close ties to the Iraqi authorities that the PUK was fighting. The PUK harassed Sipay Rizgari's troops and, to a large extent, cut off their supply lines.

Since the first Gulf War, the PUK has jointly administered Kurdistan Region with the Kurdistan Democratic Party (KDP). However, in 1994 the parties engaged in a three-year conflict, known as the Iraqi Kurdish Civil War. The conflict ended with US mediation, and reconciliation was eventually achieved.

In September 2001, the Islamist group Jund al-Islam (the Army of Islam) massacred 43 PUK members.

=== Leadership crisis and split-offs ===
Originally a centre-left party opposing the conservative tribalism of the Kurdistan Democratic Party, the PUK developed into a similarly tribalistic vehicle for the political ambitions of Jalal Talabani and his family. In 2009, influential PUK politician Nawshirwan Mustafa left the party, frustrated by widespread tribalism and corruption within the party. He proceeded to found the Gorran Movement, which in turn presented itself as an alternative to the corrupt politics of PUK and KDP.

After the founder and leader of the PUK, Jalal Talabani, died in 2017, a struggle for the leadership of the party ignited between Jalal's son Bafel Talabani and the then co-president Lahur Sheikh Jangi. On the PUK's fourth congress in December 2019, Sheikh Jangi received the most votes for the General Leadership Council. In a compromise, he and Bafel were proclaimed co-presidents. In July 2021, Bafel shut down a media outlet close to Sheikh Jangi and ousted several important commanders from the counter-terrorism and intelligence units of the PUK, who were seen as affiliates of him. Shortly after, Bafel was declared the sole leader of the party. In November, Lahur Sheikh Jangi was expelled from the PUK along a few others and Bafel took full control over the party's finances. Sheikh Jangi filed a lawsuit against the expulsion. In February 2023, a court in Erbil ruled, that the ouster from the co-presidency was contradicted PUK's internal regulation and reinstated him. A day after however, on 21 February, the judicial authority on Iraqi elections in Baghdad declared Bafel Talabani the sole leader of the PUK.

After that, Sheikh Jangi proceeded to work on founding his own party. His new party, the People's Front received its license from the interior ministry on 17 January 2024 and was joined by several former PUK-members from Lahur's wing.

== Structure ==
Within the PUK, co-Presidents are elected by the General Leadership Council. The PUK has 36 branches throughout Iraqi Kurdistan and draws membership from a broad cross-section of Kurdish society. The membership of the PUK, based on statistics compiled in September 1998, stands at 800,280 members and associates. The PUK contested the 1992 elections for the Kurdistan National Assembly, and the party list acquired 423,682 votes of the total of 957,469 valid votes cast - giving the PUK commanding majority in three of Kurdistan Region's four provinces. The PUK is a member of the Socialist International. Kosrat Rasul Ali was elected as the leader of the Supreme Political Council at the party congress in December 2019 and Lahur Talabany and Bafel Talabany were elected as Co-Presidents in February 2020 to lead the party.

=== Organizational structure ===
The PUK's structure consists of 8 bureaus:

- Bureau for Organization: Manages PUK's organizations throughout the region, as well as producing and disseminating educational and informational materials for distribution to the membership. The bureau also supervises the electoral process within the organization and ensures that the party adheres to its bylaws.
- Bureau for Information: Supervises and manages PUK media operations. Currently, the PUK operates several outlets:
  - The People of Kurdistan TV (Gali Kurdistan) (based in Sulaymaniyah), the main television station, and other smaller TV stations in the towns and districts of the region;
  - The Voice of the People of Kurdistan, a radio station established in November 1980, which broadcasts in Kurdish and Arabic. The transmission is received throughout the Middle East and Europe.
  - Kurdistan-i-Nwe, a daily Kurdish newspaper, the Al-Itihad weekly in Arabic, and The Monitor, a daily bulletin in Kurdish and Arabic, which monitors international broadcasts on matters relating to Kurdish and Iraqi affairs;
- Bureau for Culture and Democratic Organization: Acts as a liaison with professional and cultural organizations such as the Students' Union of Kurdistan, Women's' League of Kurdistan, and the Writer's Association.
- Bureau of Finance and Management: Manages the financial affairs and administrative staff of the organization. The Leadership Council, through an independent Auditing Commission, supervises the activities of this bureau.
- Bureau for Human Rights: The bureau was instituted to monitor the human rights situation in Iraqi Kurdistan, with primary emphasis on the conduct of PUK members and leadership. The bureau acts as a liaison with local human rights organizations and engages in a wide range of educational campaigns with regard to human rights principles, the rule of law, and democracy and to ensure PUK's adherence to the Universal Declaration of Human Rights. The bureau reports directly to the PUK Secretary-General.
- Bureau for Social Affairs: In conjunction with the regional authorities, the bureau facilitates settlement of social disputes, particularly with regard to land and tribal matters.
- Bureau for Martyr's and Veteran Affairs: The bureau is tasked with assisting the families and dependents of victims of the war in Kurdistan and the veteran community.
- Bureau for International Relations: The bureau of international relations coordinates the activities of PUK representatives abroad and reports to PUK's political leadership on relations with foreign government and institutions. Today, PUK has permanent offices in Washington, London, Paris, Berlin, Moscow, Rome, Stockholm and Brussels, the seat of the European Parliament. In the Middle East, the PUK has offices in Tehran, Ankara, Syria and Egypt.

== Election results ==
=== Iraq ===
Parliamentary election

Election	Leader	Votes	%	Seats	+/–	Position	Government
2010	Jalal Talabani	In Kurdistan List		17 / 325	New	—N/a	Coalition
2014	Barham Salih	789,519	6.07%	19 / 328	▲2	▲5th	Opposition
2018	Kosrat Rasul Ali	619,694	5.97%	18 / 329	▼1	▼7th	Opposition
2021	Bafel Talabani	In Kurdistani Coalition		17 / 329	▼1	7th	Coalition
2025	Bafel Talabani	548,928	4.89%	15 / 329	▼2	7th	TBA

=== Kurdistan Region ===
Parliamentary election

Election	Leader	Vote	Seats	±	Result
1992	Jalal Talabani	423,833	49 / 100	New	43.8%
2005	Jalal Talabani	–	38 / 111	▼11	–
2009	Barham Salih	–	25 / 111	▼13	–
2013	Barham Salih	350,500	24 / 111	▼1	24.21%
2018	Kosrat Rasul Ali	319,219	21 / 111	▼3	20.5%
2024	Bafel Talabani	409,548	23 / 100	▲2	21.77%

== Presidents from PUK ==
#	Photo	President	Election(s)	Presidency start date	Presidency end date	Time in office
6		Jalal Talabani جلال طالباني / جەلال تاڵەبانی (1933–2017)	2005 2006 2010	7 April 2005	24 July 2014	9 years, 108 days
7		Fuad Masum فؤاد معصوم / فواد مەعسووم (born 1938)	2014	24 July 2014	2 October 2018	4 years, 70 days
8		Barham Salih برهم صالح / بەرهەم ساڵح (born 1960)	2018	2 October 2018	17 October 2022	4 years, 15 days
9		Abdul Latif Rashid لطيف رشید / لەتیف ڕەشید (born 1944)	2022	17 October 2022	12 April 2026	3 years, 177 days
10		Nizar Amidi نزار آميدي / نزار ئامێدی (born 1968)	2026	12 April 2026	incumbent	215 days

== Literature ==
- Gunter, Michael (2014). Out of Nowhere: The Kurds of Syria in Peace and War. London: Hurst. p. 44. ISBN 9781849045322.
- McDowall, David (2004). A modern history of the Kurds (3rd ed.). London: I.B. Tauris. ISBN 1-85043-416-6.
