= List of political parties in the Kurdistan Region =

This article lists political parties in the Kurdistan Region of Iraq represented in the Kurdistan Region Parliament, their ideologies, votes in the latest election, number of MPs, and leaders. A second part shows parties not represented in the parliament. The list is updated based on the 2024 Kurdistan Region parliamentary election.

== Parties represented in the Kurdistan Region Parliament ==
Party	Abbreviation	Ideology	Votes	%	Seats	Leader
Kurdistan Democratic Party پارتی دیموکراتی کوردستان; Partiya Demokrat a Kurdistanê	KDP	Kurdish nationalism Conservatism	809,197	4315%	39 / 100	Masoud Barzani
Patriotic Union of Kurdistan یەکێتیی نیشتمانیی کوردستان; Yekêtiyî Nîştimaniyî Kurdistan	PUK	Kurdish nationalism Social democracy	408,141	2177%	23 / 100	Bafel Talabani
New Generation Movement جوڵانه‌وه‌ی نه‌وه‌ی نوێ; Culaneweyî Neweyî Niwê	NG	Liberalism	290,991	1552%	15 / 100	Shaswar Abdulwahid
Kurdistan Islamic Union یەکگرتووی ئیسلامیی کوردستان; Yekgirtûyî Îslamiyî Kurdistan	Yekgirtû	Islamism; Social conservatism	116,981	624%	7 / 100	Salahaddin Bahaaddin
Kurdistan Justice Group کۆمه‌لی دادگەری کوردستان; Komelî Dadgerî Kurdistan	Komelî	Kurdish Islamism; Social conservatism	64,710	345%	3 / 100	Ali Bapir
National Stance Movement ڕەوتی هەڵوێستی نیشتیمانی; Rewtî Helwêstî Nîştimanî	Halwest	Kurdish nationalism Anti-corruption	55,775	297%	4 / 100	Ali Hama Saleh
People's Front بەرەی گەل; Bereyî Gel	People's Front	Kurdish nationalism Social democracy	33,365	178%	2 / 100	Lahur Talabani
Kurdistan Region Coalition	Kurdistan Region Coalition	Kurdish nationalism	13,199	070%	1 / 100	Mohammed Haji Mahmoud
Gorran Movement بزووتنەوەی گۆڕان; Bizûtineweyî Gorran	Gorran	Kurdish nationalism Social liberalism	11,621	062%	1 / 100	Dana Ahmed Majid
Sardam Coalition	Sardam Coalition	Kurdish nationalism	15,581	1%	0 / 100	Mohammed Haji Mahmoud
Kurdistan Islamic Movement بزووتنەوەی ئیسلامی کوردستان; Bizûtineweyî Îslamî Kurdistan	KIM	Islamism	5,503	029%	0 / 100	Erfan Ali Abdulaziz
Kurdistan Islamic Relations Movement بزووتنەوەی پەیوەندیی ئیسلامیی کوردستان; Bizûtineweyî Peywendîyî Îslamîyî Kurdistan	KIRM	Islamism	1,799	010%	0 / 100	Kamîlî Hacî Elî
National Coalition ھاوپەیمانی نیشتمانی; Hawpeymanî Nîştimanî	HN	Kurdish nationalism Social democracy Self-determination; Reformism	1,228	007%	0 / 100	Aram Qadir
Minority parties that entered over the quota seats
Christian Alliance ܐܘܝܘܬܐ ܡܫܝܢܚܬܐ التحالف المسيحي; Քրիստոնեական դաշինք	Christian Alliance	Assyrian/Armenian interests	12,288	066%	2 / 100	Ano Abdoka
Babylon Movement حركة بابليون	Babylon Movement	Assyrian/Christian interests, Islamism (de-facto)	7,399	039%	1 / 100	Rayan al-Kildani
Turkmen Reform Party; Türkmen Reform Partisi	TRP	Turkmen nationalism	3,664	020%	1 / 100	Muna Kahveci
Iraqi Turkmen Front; Irak Türkmen Cephesi	ITF	Turkmen nationalism	1,725	009%	0 / 100	Hasan Turan

== Parties without representation in the Kurdistan Region Parliament ==
Party	Abbreviation	Ideology	Leader
Parties founded after 2018
Athra Alliance ܒܪܩܝܡܐ ܕܐܬܼܪܐ تحالف اثرا	Athra	Assyrian nationalism	Yacob Yaco
Parties founded after 2010
Kurdistan Green Party پارتی سەوزی کوردستان; Partî Sewzî Kurdistan	Sewzekan	Green politics Animal rights	Milko Baziyanî
Kurdistan Liberal Democratic Party پارتی لیبرال دیموکراتی کوردستان; Partî Lîbral Dîmukratî Kurdistan	PLDK	Liberalism	Leadership council
Kurdistan Society's Freedom Movement تەڤگەری ئازادیی کۆمەڵگەی کوردستان; Tevgerî Azadiyî Komelgeyî Kurdistan	Tevgerî Azadiyî	Democratic confederalism Libertarian socialism Feminism	Tara Husên; Selam Ebdulla
National Coalition ھاوپەیمانی نیشتیمانی; Hawpeymanî Nîştimanî	Hawpeymanî	Kurdish nationalism Social democracy	Aram Qadir
Older parties
Chaldean Syriac Assyrian Popular Council ܡܘܬܒܐ ܥܡܡܝܐ ܟܠܕܝܐ ܣܘܪܝܝܐ ܐܬܘܪܝܐ; Motḇā ʿammāyā kaldāyā suryāyā āṯurāyā	Motwa	Assyrian nationalism	Jameel Zaito
Bet-Nahrain Democratic Party ܓܒܐ ܕܝܡܘܩܪܛܝܐ ܕܒܝܬ ܢܗܪܝܢ; Gaba Demoqrataya d-Bet-Nahrain	BNDP	Assyrian nationalism	Romeo Hakkari
Assyrian Democratic Movement ܙܘܥܐ ܕܝܡܘܩܪܛܝܐ ܐܬܘܪܝܐ; Zawʻá Demoqraṭáyá ʼÁṯuráyá	Zowaa	Assyrian nationalism	Yacob Yaco
Nation List; Millet Listesi	Millet	Turkmen nationalism	Azad Ekrem Muhammet
Turkmen Development Party; Türkmen Kalkınma Partisi	TKP	Turkmen nationalism	Muhammet Saadeddin Shukr
Democratic National Union of Kurdistan یەکێتی نەتەوەیی دیموکراتی کوردستان; Yekêtî Netewêyî Dîmukratî Kurdistan	YNDK	Kurdish nationalism	Xafûr Mexmûrî
Kurdistan Conservative Party پارتی پارێزگارانی کوردستان; Partî Parêzgaranî Kurdistan	Parêzgaran	Kurdish nationalism Conservatism	Necat Sûrçî
Kurdistan Democratic Liberation Movement بزووتنەوەی ڕزگاری دیموکراتی کوردستان; Bizûtineweyî Rizgarî Dîmukratî Kurdistan	BRDK	Kurdish nationalism	Ebdulla Nazenînî
Kurdistan Laborers' Party پارتی ڕەنجدەرانی کوردستان; Partî Rencderanî Kurdistan	PRK	Kurdish nationalism Social democracy	Bapir Kamela
Kurdistan Toilers' Party حزبی زەحمەتکێشانی کوردستان; Hizbî Zehmetkêşanî Kurdistan	Zehmetkêşan	Kurdish nationalism Social democracy	Belên Ebdulla
Movement of the Democratic People of Kurdistan بزووتنەوەی دیموکراتی گەلی کوردستان; Bizûtineweyî Dîmukratî Gelî Kurdistan	MDPK	Kurdish nationalism Communism	Mam Xidir
Progressive Kurdistan Democratic Party حزبی پێشکەوتنخوازی دیموکراتی کوردستان; Hizbî Pêşkewtinxiwazî Dîmukratî Kurdistan	PKDP	Progressivism; Kurdish nationalism	Amoza Azad
Worker-communist Party of Kurdistan حزبی کۆمۆنیستی کرێکاریی کوردستان; Hizbî Komunîstî Krêkariyî Kurdistan	WP	Communism; Anti-authoritarianism; Feminism	Osman Hacî Merûf
Communist Party of Kurdistan – Iraq حزبی شیوعی كوردستان - عیراق; Hizbî Şiyuî Kurdistan – Îraq	WP	Communism; Kurdish nationalism Civil liberties	Kawa Mahmud

== Defunct parties ==
- Action Party for the Independence of Kurdistan
- Future Party (Ayinde)
- Kurdish Tribal Association
- Kurdistan Democratic Solution Party
- Kurdistan Revolutionary Party
- Shursh
- Hawpa

== See also ==
- List of political parties in Iraq
- List of political parties in Rojava
