= 2018 Kurdistan Region parliamentary election =

- 30 September 2018

Total of 111 seats of the Kurdistan National Assembly 56 seats needed for a majority
- Turnout: 51.4%
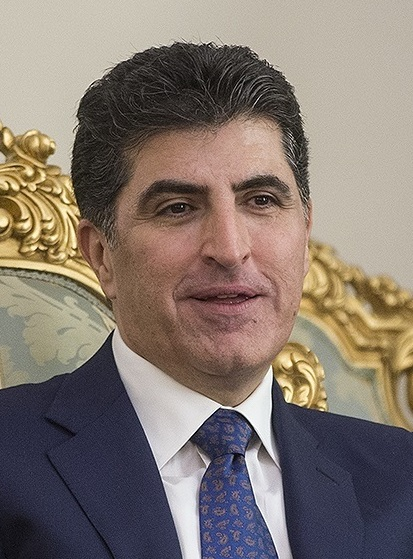

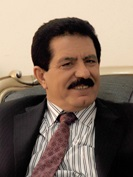
	First party	Second party
Leader	Nechirvan Barzani	Kosrat Rasul Ali
Party	KDP	PUK
Last election	38	18
Seats won	45	21
Seat change	▲7	▲3
Popular vote	688,070	319,219
Percentage	44.13%	20.47%
Prime Minister before election
Nechirvan Barzani
KDP
Elected Prime Minister
Masrour Barzani
KDP

Kurdistan Democratic Party: 45 seats Patriotic Union of Kurdistan: 21 seats Movement for Change: 12 seats New Generation Movement: 8 seats Kurdistan Islamic Group: 7 seats Kurdistan Islamic Union: 5 seats Sardam alliance: 1 seat Freedom List: 1 seat Minorities: 11 seats

Parliamentary elections took place in the Kurdistan Region on 30 September 2018 to elect Parliament. The election came a year after the 2017 referendum to succeed and left the ruling Kurdistan Democratic Party (KDP) with 45 seats, that positioning it to lead the next regional government. Announcement of the results was delayed for three weeks. The KDP's historic rival and junior coalition partner in government, the Patriotic Union of Kurdistan (PUK), was in second place with 21 seats. The results suggested that Masoud Barzani’s KDP would take a dominant position in Kurdish politics.

== Background ==
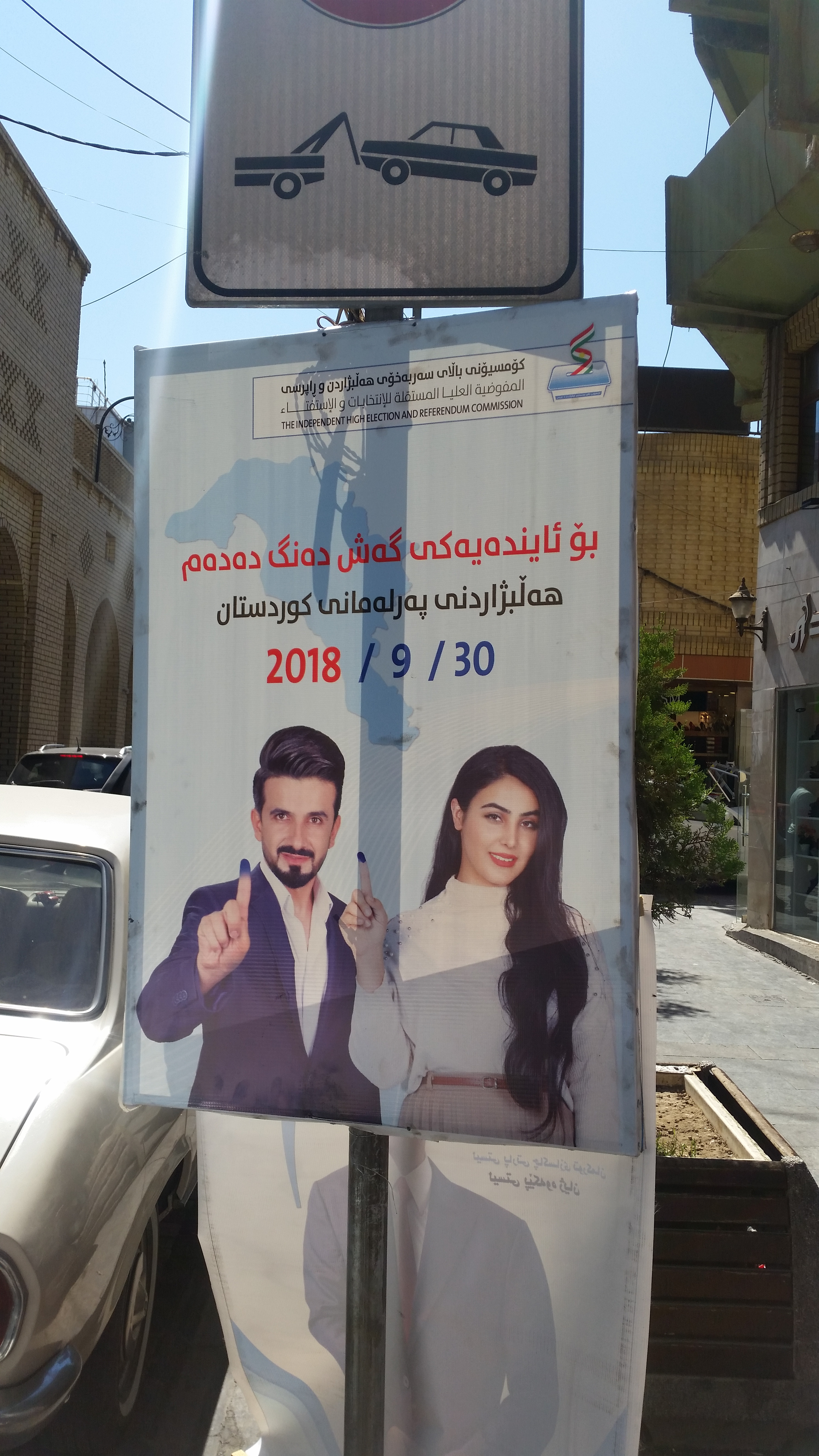
Poster for the elections of the Parliament of the Iraqi Kurdistan general election, 2018

Following the end of the Gulf War in 1991, a civil war (mainly between the Erbil and Duhok-based KDP and the Sulaymaniyah-based PUK) led to the establishment of two separate Kurdish regional governments. Following the reconciliation and a power-sharing agreement between the two parties, and Parliamentary elections in 2005, a unified Kurdistan Regional Government was created. The joint KDP–PUK Democratic Patriotic Alliance of Kurdistan assumed power and formed a government that was headed by Nechervan Barzani (KDP; 2006–09) and Barham Salih (PUK; 2009–12).

When former PUK official Nawshirwan Mustafa broke away to form the new Gorran Movement, the new party primarily damaged the PUK's electoral support in the 2009 general elections. The KDP–PUK alliance, now renamed as the Kurdistan List, formed another government headed by Nechervan Barzani.

Presidential elections were due to coincide with parliamentary elections in 2013, but however, in the months leading to the elections, the parliament extended Massoud Barzani’s term for another two years. When the parliamentary elections were held, the Kurdistan Democratic Party (KDP) and the Patriotic Union of Kurdistan (PUK) ran on separate lists for the first time since 1992. With its traditionally strong backing in Duhok and Erbil provinces, the KDP managed to expand its plurality, while falling short of an outright majority. The PUK also suffered from internal conflicts during the absence of its leader Jalal Talabani, who was recovering from a stroke, and from strong competition by the Gorran Movement, which established itself as the strongest party in Sulaymaniyah, previously a major stronghold of the PUK.

The provincial elections were delayed until November, and then again to 2014, when they were held in conjunction with the Iraqi parliamentary election. In 2015, as Barzani's term was due to expire, debates continued as to whether it should be extended further, with supporters citing the northern Iraq offense and the need for stability in the Kurdish regional government. Others have expressed concern that a continued extension of Barzani's term could lead to a President for Life scenario.

Both Kurdish politicians and observers in the area worry that the polarizing debate over the presidency will destabilize Kurdish democracy and weaken the region in its fight against the Islamic State. In July 2016, Barzani announced that he would not seek another term as president. The Kurdistan Region Parliament on 24 October 2017 announced that the elections for the presidency and the parliament had been delayed by eight months. The decision was made after the electoral commission stated that the political parties had failed to register their candidates amidst the Iraqi-Kurdish clashes.

== Participating parties ==
21 parties registered for Kurdistan's parliamentary elections:

1. Coalition for Democracy and Justice (Barham Salih)
2. Kurdistan Democratic Party (KDP)
3. Turkmen Development Party
4. Turkmen Democratic Movement in Kurdistan
5. Gorran Movement
6. Kurdistan Islamic Union (KIU)
7. Assyrian Democratic Movement (Zowaa)
8. Bet-Nahrain Democratic Party
9. Individual Armenian Political Entity (Aram Birzo Hamo)
10. Individual Armenian Political Entity (Obar Sipan Gharib)
11. Turkmen Reform Party
12. Kurdistan Islamic Group (Komal)
13. Patriotic Union of Kurdistan (PUK)
14. Yezidi Democratic Party
15. Kurdistan Toilers' Party
16. Kurdistan Socialist Democratic Party
17. Chaldean Syriac Assyrian Popular Council
18. Communist Party of Kurdistan – Iraq
19. New Generation Movement
20. Conservative Party of Kurdistan
21. Toilers Party of Kurdistan

== Electoral system ==
The 111 members of the Kurdistan National Assembly were elected by open list proportional representation in a single constituency. Five seats were reserved for the Christian Assyrian minority, five for Turkmen, and one for Armenians. Furthermore, 30% of the members must be women.

== Notable participating parties ==
List No.	Party	Kurdish name	Party leaders
105	Patriotic Union of Kurdistan	یەکێتیی نیشتمانیی کوردستان; Yekêtiy Nîştimaniy Kurdistan	Kosrat Rasul Ali
119	Towards Reform	بەرەو ئیسڵاح; Hevpeymaniya Ber bi Îslah	Kurdistan Islamic Union and Kurdistan Islamic Movement
127	Sardam Alliance	سەردەم; Hevpeymaniya Serdem	Mohammad Hajji Mahmoud
134	New Generation Movement	جوڵانەوەی نەوەی نوێ; Culanewey Newey Nwê	Shaswar Abdulwahid Qadir
148	Gorran Movement	گۆڕان; Bizûtinewey Gorran	Omar Said Ali
156	Kurdistan Conservative Party	پارتی پارێزگارانی کوردستان; Partî Parêzgaranî Kurdistan	Zaid Surchi
164	Communist Party of Kurdistan – Iraq (Freedom List)	ئازادی; Partî Azadî	Kamal Shakir
183	Kurdistan Democratic Party	پارتی دیموکراتی کوردستان; Partî Dîmukratî Kurdistan	Massoud Barzani
194	Kurdistan Islamic Group	کۆمەڵی ئیسلامی کوردستان-عێراق; Komelley Îslamiy Kurdistaê / Îraq	Ali Bapir

== Results ==
A ballot meant for Kurdish elections.

Results
Political party	2018			2013	Change
Political party	Votes	%	Seats	Seats	Seats +/−
Kurdistan Democratic Party	688,070	44.1%	45	38	▲7
Patriotic Union of Kurdistan	319,219	20.5%	21	18	▲3
Gorran Movement	186,903	12%	12	24	▼12
New Generation Movement	127,115	8.2%	8	New	▲8
Kurdistan Justice Party	109,494	7%	7	6	▲1
Kurdistan Islamic Union	79,912	5.1%	5	11	▼6
Sardam Alliance _{(coalition consisting the Kurdistan Socialist Democratic Party, Democratic National Union of Kurdistan and Kurdistan Toilers' Party)}	15,581	1%	1	2	▼1
Freedom List (Communist Party of Kurdistan – Iraq)	8,063	0.5%	1	1	Steady
Total	1,559,021		100	100	
Turkmen minority reserved seats
Turkmen Development List (Turkmen Reform List)	3,318	28.9%	2	2	Steady
Turkmen Reform Party	3,125	27.2%	1	0	▲1
Turkmen/Iraqi Turkmen Front	1,545	13.5%	1	1	Steady
Nation List	885	7.7%	1		
Biz Turkmen (Yelderem)	846	7.4%	0		
Erbil Turkmen Coalition	760	6.6%	0		
Erbil Turkmen List	695	6.1%	0		
Turkmen Democratic Movement	298	2.6%	0	3	
Total	11,472		5	5	Steady
Assyrian minority reserved seats
National Union Coalition	8,088	57.7%	3	New	▲3
Chaldean Syriac Assyrian Popular Council	2,963	21.1%	1	2	▼1
Assyrian Democratic Movement/Rafidain List	2,626	18.7%	1	2	▼1
Democratic Christian List	238	1.7%	0	New	
Sons of Mesopotamia (Abna al Nahrain List)	108	0.8%	0	1	▼1
Total	14,023		5	5	
Armenian minority reserved seat
Name	Votes (in amount)		Votes (in percentage)	Seats won (2018)	Seats won (2013)
Fahik Kamal Saranyan	590		20%	1	0
Berunt Nissan Markos	590		20%	0	1
Aram Bozo Hamo	611		20.7%	0	0
Adkar Hakob	439		14.9%	0	0
Morad Mardros Wartan	425		14.4%	0	0
Nobar Sypar Qarib	290		9.8%	0	0
Total	2,945		100%	1	1

Overall total (counted)
Votes (amount)	Votes (percentage)	Registered voters	Turnout percentage	Total seats
1,587,461	100%	3,085,461	51.4%	111
