= 2009 Kurdistan Region general election =

- 25 July 2009
- Presidential election
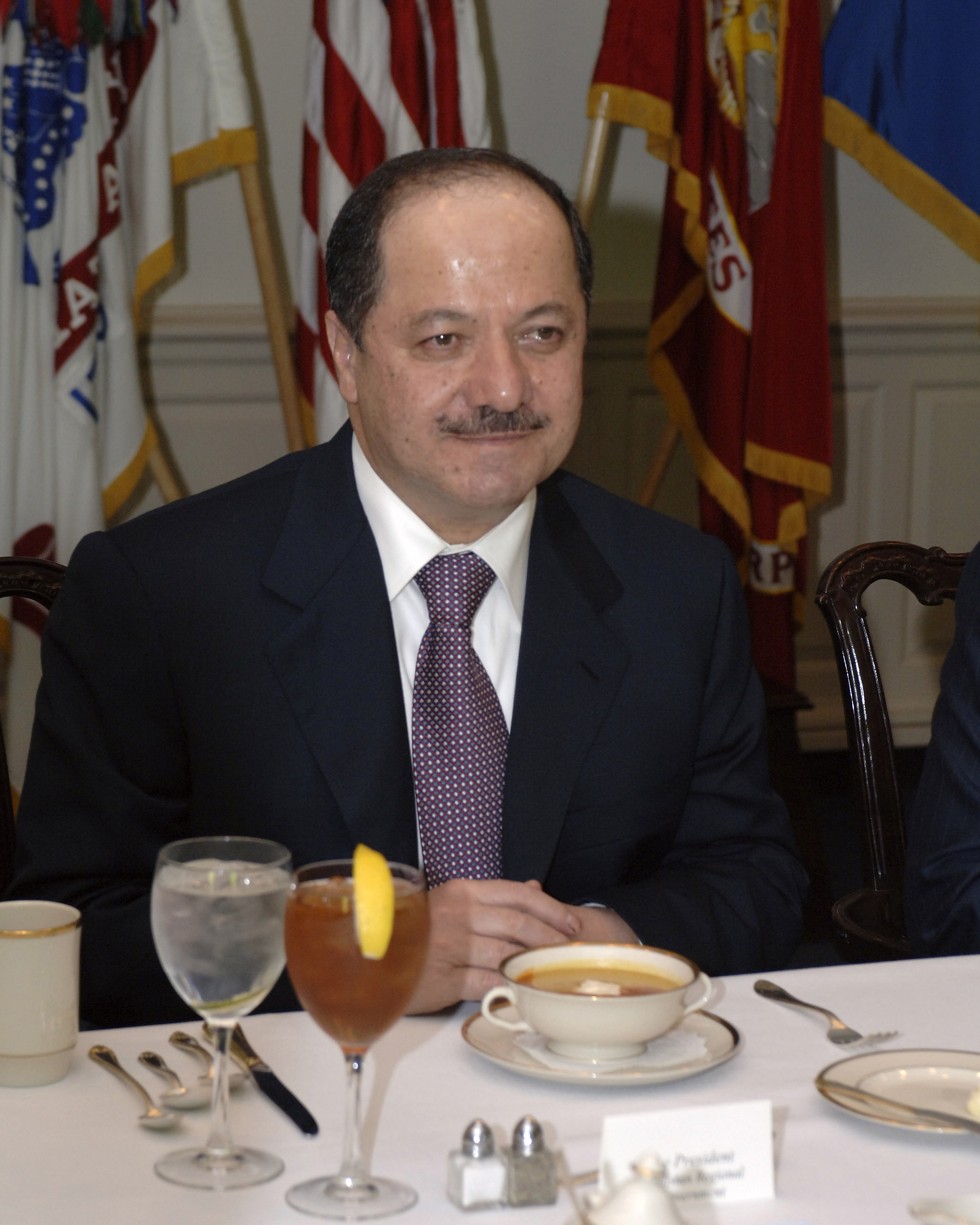

Candidate	Masoud Barzani	Kamal Mirawdeli
Party	Kurdistan List	Independent
Popular vote	1,266,397	460,323
Percentage	69.60%	25.30%
President before election
Masoud Barzani
KDP
Elected President
Masoud Barzani
KDP
- National Assembly election
- All 111 seats in the Kurdistan National Assembly; 56 seats needed for a majority
Party	Leader	Vote %	Seats	+/–
Kurdistan List	Barham Salih	57.37	59	−19
Gorran	Nawshirwan Mustafa	23.72	25	New
Service & Reform		12.84	13	−4
KIM	Sadiq Abdulaziz	1.45	2	New
TDH	Kalkhi Najmaddin Noureddin	0.98	3	−1
Social Justice		0.80	1	−3
CSAPC	Jameel Zaito	0.56	3	New
ITF	Kan'an Shakir Aziz	0.38	1	New
ADM	Yonadam Kanna	0.30	2	0
Erbil Turkmen		0.21	1	New
Independents	–	0.42	1	0
This lists parties that won seats. See the complete results below.
Prime Minister before	Prime Minister after
Nechervan Barzani; KDP	Barham Salih; PUK

General elections were held in the Kurdistan Region of Iraq on 25 July 2009 to elect a president and the 111 members of the National Assembly. Around 2.5 million people were eligible to vote, although those outside the region were not allowed to vote. The elections had originally been scheduled to take place on 19 May, but were delayed until 25 July. A referendum to approve the constitution of Kurdistan Region originally planned for the same day was delayed until 1 August, and eventually cancelled.

Campaigning for the elections officially started on 22 June 2009 and was to be stopped 48 hours before voting started. The elections were held with 84 registration centers and 5,403 polling stations in Kurdistan Region and 5 polling stations in Baghdad.

== Electoral system ==
The 111 members of the National Assembly were elected by closed list proportional representation, with a requirement that least 30% of the candidates on a list must be female. The open list system was introduced for the simultaneous governorate elections and the decision to stay with a closed list was criticised by members of the Kurdistan National Assembly who argued open lists strengthened the relationship between voters and candidates and reduced corruption.

Eleven of the 111 seats were reserved for minorities; five for Assyrians, five for Turkmen and one for Armenians.

== Presidential candidates ==
The five presidential candidates were:

- Ahmed Mohammed Rasul (also known as Safen Haji Sheikh Mohammed)
- Masoud Barzani (incumbent president)
- Hussein Garmiyani (a businessman)
- Halow Ibrahim Ahmed (brother-in-law of Iraqi President Jalal Talabani)
- Kamal Mirawdeli (a London-based scholar)

=== National Assembly candidates ===
There were 509 candidates running in the National Assembly elections representing 25 parties or lists. Five of these entities were electoral alliances and others were political parties. The two main Kurdish parties - the Kurdistan Democratic Party of Iraq of Kurdistan President Masoud Barzani and the Patriotic Union of Kurdistan of the President of Iraq, Jalal Talabani - continued their electoral coalition in the Kurdistan List. They were challenged by the Gorran Movement led by Nawshirwan Mustafa, the former deputy secretary general of the PUK and Jawhar Namiq, a former secretary general of the KDP and speaker of the Kurdistan National Assembly. The Kurdistan Islamic Union and Islamic Group in Kurdistan formed a coalition with two secular parties called the Service and Reform List.

The Assyrian seats were contested by four lists, the Turkmen seats by four and the Armenian seat by three individuals.

#	Name	Parties	Platform
50	Kurdistan Bright Future List	-	Led by Dr. Muhammad Saleh Hama Faraj, who lived in exile in the UK from 1980 to 2008. Dr. Faraj promised to separate government from the political parties, strengthen an independent, non-corrupt and just judiciary, and that if he becomes a member of parliament he will demand a rewrite of the constitution.
51	Democratic National Union of Kurdistan	Democratic National Union of Kurdistan	The party's main agenda is gaining independence for Greater Kurdistan, which includes territories of Turkey, Iran and Syria. The party had close ties with the PKK in the 1990s. In 2005, the party was part of the Democratic Patriotic Alliance of Kurdistan(DPAK) coalition and received 1 seat. It is led by Ghafur Makhmuri.
52	Iraqi Constitutional Party	-	Founded in 2005 by the Iraqi Interior Minister Jawad Bulani.
53	Kurdistan Toilers and Workers list	-	The Kurdistan Toilers and Workers Party List promised it would work to improve justice and the rule of law in the region. The Party has been working as an organization for 14 years.
54	Kurdistan List	Kurdistan Democratic Party (KDP); Patriotic Union of Kurdistan (PUK)	An alliance between the two largest parties, who held 59 of the 111 seats in the parliament. They are seen as broadly center-left to centrist parties. The list is led by Masoud Barzani and Jalal Talabani.
55	Social Justice and Freedom List	Kurdistan Communist Party; Kurdistan Toilers' Party; Kurdistan Independent Work Party; Kurdistan Democratic Solution Party; Movement of the Democratic People of Kurdistan	These parties are left-wing oriented in ideology. Their main concern is to keep Iraqi Kurdistan secular. KCP was part of the DPAK alliance in 2005 and received 3 seats. KTP won one seat in the 2005 elections independently.
57	Gorran Movement		Considered to be the main opposition to the Kurdistan List, particularly in areas dominated by the Patriotic Union of Kurdistan(PUK). Most of its members, including the leader Nawshirwan Mustafa, are ex-PUK officials. It was running mainly to address what it saw as corruption and nepotism undertaken by the KDP and PUK.
58	Islamic Movement of Kurdistan	Islamic Movement of Kurdistan	Founded in 1979, it is led by Shaykh Uthman Abd-Aziz and gets most of its support in-and-around the city of Halabja. While it has not officially forced Sharia law in its controlling territory, the party does want Islamic law to be the main source for the constitution.
59	Service and Reform List	Kurdistan Islamic Union; Islamic Group in Kurdistan; Kurdistan Socialist Democratic Party; Future Party	KIU considers itself as "Islamic reformative" and has ties to the Muslim Brotherhood. In the 2005 elections, it joined DPAK alliance and won 9 seats. IGK was formed after some members split from the Islamic Movement of Kurdistan (#58) in 2001 and is rumored to have some ties with Iran. It came second to the DPAK alliance in the 2005 elections and won 6 seats in the parliament. Its leader Ali Bapir was imprisoned by the US forces between 2003 and 2005 on allegations of attacking coalition forces and aiding Ansar Al Islam. Future Party was recently created by Qadir Aziz who was sacked as the leader of the Kurdistan Toiler's Party for not being "committed to the party." KSDP was part of the DPAK alliance in 2005 and received 2 seats.
60	Independent Youths List	-	The Independent Youth List is headed by Hiwa Abdul-Karim Aziz (known as Hiwa Fryad Ras), a 30-year-old journalist. The list consists of 10 people, made up of lawyers, university teachers and journalists who promised to make the Kurdistan Regional Parliament more active and give more attention to youth issues.
61	Kurdistan Conservative Party	-	A tribal affiliated party. It is mostly made of the Surchi clan and is led by Zaid Surchi. The clan has clashed with the KDP on numerous occasions. It only received 5,500 votes in the 2005 elections.
62	Progression List	-	Headed by Halo Ibrahim Ahmed, a former high ranking PUK official. He is Jalal Talabani's brother in law and was running for the presidential elections as well.
64	Unified Chaldean List	Chaldean Democratic Union Party; Chaldean National Council	Its main objective is to designate Chaldean Catholics a separate ethnicity from the rest of Assyrians. The two parties have strong ties to the Chaldean Catholic Church. CDUP was part of the DPAK alliance in 2005 and received one seat.
65	Chaldean Syriac Assyrian; Autonomy List	Khaldu-Ashur Communist Party; Assyrian Patriotic Party	KACP is the Assyrian branch of the Kurdistan Communist Party (#55) and its stronghold is in Ankawa. APP's secretary general, Nimrod Baito, is currently KRG's tourism minister. The list's main goal is to absorb the Nineveh Plains into Iraqi Kurdistan region and have autonomy for it.
67	National Rafidain List	Assyrian Democratic Movement	Founded in 1979, the party was part of the DKAP alliance in 2005 and received 2 seats.
68	Chaldean Syriac Assyrian Popular Council	-	Founded by Sarkis Aghajan, a high ranking KDP official. It is headed by Jamil Zayto. The party is seen as an "Assyrian/Christian branch" of the KDP. It has publicly endorsed Masoud Barzani in the presidential elections.
69	Turkmen Democratic Movement	-	Created in 2004 by ex-members of the Iraqi Turkmen Front, believing having closer ties to the KRG instead of Turkey would serve the community better. It wants Kirkuk to be annexed by Iraqi Kurdistan. The party receives funds from the KDP and was part of the DPAK alliance in the 2005 elections, which led to it receiving 4 seats.
70	Erbil's Turkmen List	-	This list is led by five well-known Turkmen persons in Erbil: Sherdil Tahsin Arsalan, Ta'fa Rostam Qasab, Thaura Saleh, Nafeh Rostam and Ahtham Abdul Karim. The List wants Kirkuk to be part of the Kurdish region, and they are against Turkey's interference in Turkmen affairs.
71	Independent Turkment List		This list is headed by Kanhan Shakir Aziz; the list says Turkmen are the majority in Kirkuk and that it should be an independent region.
72	Turkmen Rerform List	Movement of the Independent Turkmen (an affiliate of the Iraqi Turkmen Front)	Headed by Kan'an Shakir Aziz, the party's main objective is to not have Kirkuk be annexed by Kurdistan Region.

Armenian individuals:

- Aram Shahine Dawood Bakoyan (74)
- Eshkhan Malkon Sargisyan (73)
- Aertex Morses Sargisyan (75)

== Conduct ==
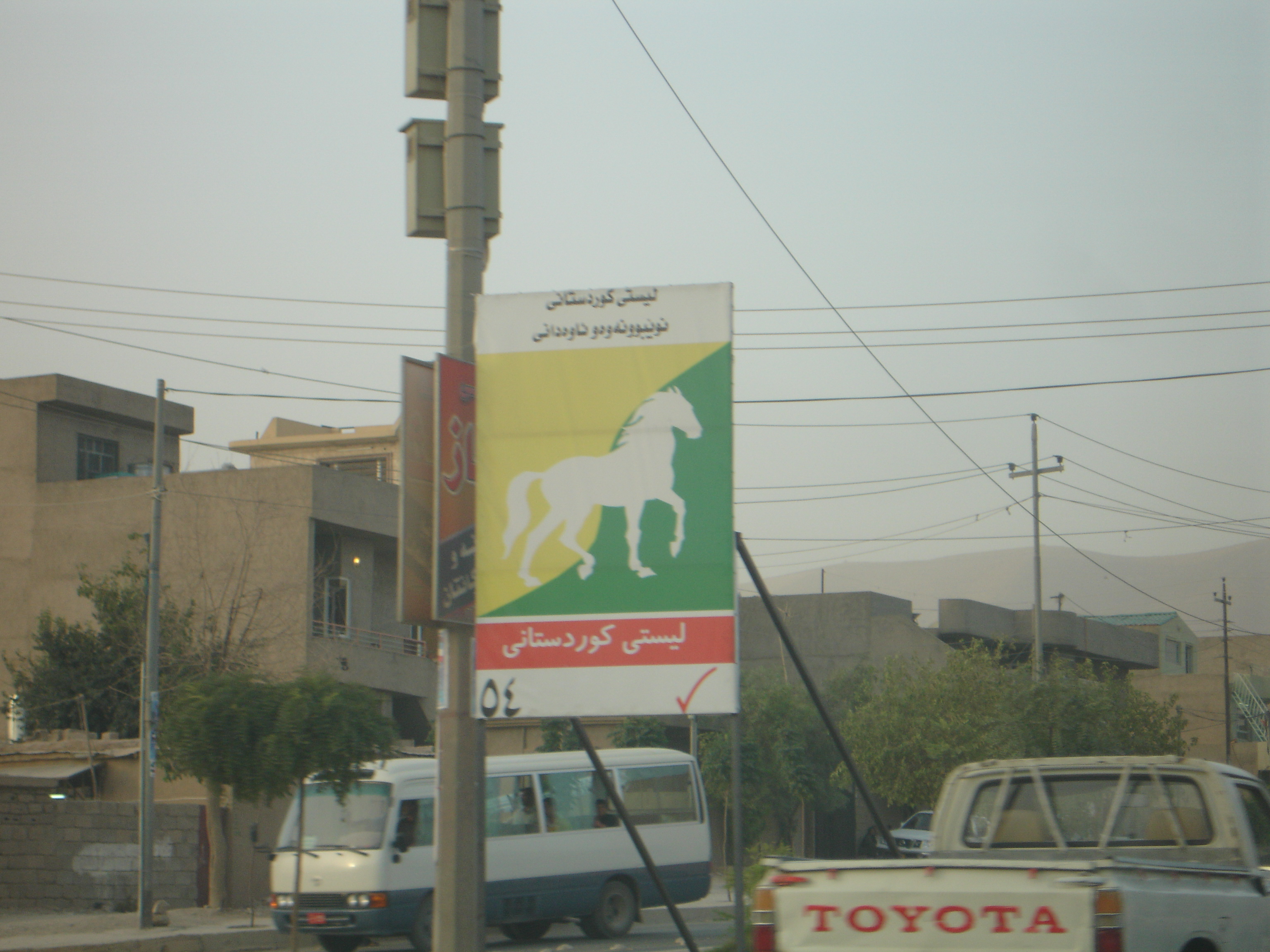
A Kurdistan List poster in Sulaymaniyah

International observers monitored the elections, including from the European Commission.

During the campaign the electoral commission was reported to have fined the Kurdistan List 3 million riyals for unspecified electoral violations.

A poll of 1,000 people by the Kurdistan-based Point Organization for Opinion Polls & Strategic Studies found most thought the Gorran Movement would pose a serious challenge but 49% thought the Kurdistan List would use "threats and fraud". The Gorran Movement accused the ruling parties of sacking regional government employees who had links to their party. They also claimed that a colonel in the peshmerge regional army had been arrested for supporting them. A Kurdistan List candidate responded by saying "No party allows its members to vote for another list". The Progress List also accused regional intelligence agents of threatening to kill their supporters. Supporters of the Gorran Movement were shot at in Kifri. Supporters of the Kurdistan List and Gorran Movement clashed in Sulaimaniyah and were separated by police wielding taser guns.

The Worker-communist Party of Kurdistan boycotted the elections because it claimed conditions and principles for a fair elections were not met.

== Results ==
=== President ===
Candidate	Party	Votes	%
Masoud Barzani	Kurdistan List	1,266,397	69.60
Kamal Mirawdeli	Independent	460,323	25.30
Halow Ibrahim Ahmed		63,377	3.48
Ahmed Mohammed Rasul		18,890	1.04
Hussein Garmiyani		10,665	0.59
Total		1,819,652	100.00
Source: Kurdistan Regional Government

=== National Assembly ===
Allocation of seats

Initial reports gave the Kurdistan List 60 percent of the vote, equating to around 55 seats. The Gorran Movement claimed it had won around 28 seats.

According to the Los Angeles Times, "Change mounted a spirited challenge to the monopoly on power of the two main parties, the Kurdistan Democratic Party and the Patriotic Union of Kurdistan, making this the first competitive election the semiautonomous enclave has seen. Turnout was put at 78.5%, an indication of the enthusiasm the contest has generated among Kurds."

The following tables show the results of the parliamentary and presidential votes by party and by presidential candidate. Seats in yellow indicate reserved minority seats.

Party or alliance		Votes	%	Seats	+/–
Kurdistan List	Kurdistan Democratic Party	1,076,370	57.37	30	–10
Kurdistan List	Patriotic Union of Kurdistan	1,076,370	57.37	29	–9
Kurdistan List	Total	1,076,370	57.37	59	–19
Gorran Movement		445,024	23.72	25	New
Service and Reform List	Kurdistan Islamic Union	240,842	12.84	6	–3
Service and Reform List	Kurdistan Islamic Group	240,842	12.84	4	+2
Service and Reform List	Kurdistan Socialist Democratic Party	240,842	12.84	2	0
Service and Reform List	Future Party	240,842	12.84	1	New
Service and Reform List	Total	240,842	12.84	13	–4
Kurdistan Islamic Movement		27,147	1.45	2	New
Turkmen Democratic Movement		18,464	0.98	3	–1
Social Justice and Freedom	Kurdistan Toilers' Party	15,028	0.80	1	–
Social Justice and Freedom	Communist Party of Kurdistan – Iraq	15,028	0.80	1	–
Social Justice and Freedom	Kurdistan Independent Work Party	15,028	0.80	1	New
Social Justice and Freedom	Kurdistan Democratic Solution Party	15,028	0.80	1	–
Social Justice and Freedom	Movement of the Democratic People of Kurdistan	15,028	0.80	1	–
Social Justice and Freedom	Total	15,028	0.80	1	–3
Chaldean Syriac Assyrian Popular Council		10,595	0.56	3	New
Turkmen Reform	Iraqi Turkmen Front	7,077	0.38	1	New
Rafidain List	Assyrian Democratic Movement	5,690	0.30	2	0
Erbil Turkmen		3,906	0.21	1	New
Kurdistan Labor and Toilers Party		3,770	0.20	0	New
Kurdistan Conservative Party		2,426	0.13	0	0
Kurdistan Reform Movement		2,071	0.11	0	New
Independent Youths List		1,906	0.10	0	New
Democratic National Union of Kurdistan		1,700	0.09	0	–1
United Chaldean	Chaldean Democratic Union Party	1,700	0.09	0	–1
United Chaldean	Chaldean National Congress	1,700	0.09	0	New
United Chaldean	Total	1,700	0.09	0	–1
Chaldean Syriac; Assyrian Autonomy	Assyrian Patriotic Party	1,680	0.09	0	New
Chaldean Syriac; Assyrian Autonomy	Khaldu-Ashur Communist Party	1,680	0.09	0	New
Chaldean Syriac; Assyrian Autonomy	Total	1,680	0.09	0	New
Kurdistan Bright Future		1,001	0.05	0	New
Progress List		883	0.05	0	New
Iraqi Constitutional Party		708	0.04	0	New
Independent Turkmen List		373	0.02	0	New
Independents		7,835	0.42	1	0
Total		1,876,196	100.00	111	0
