= 2005 Kurdistan Region parliamentary election =

- 30 January 2005

All 111 seats in the Kurdistan National Assembly 56 seats needed for a majority
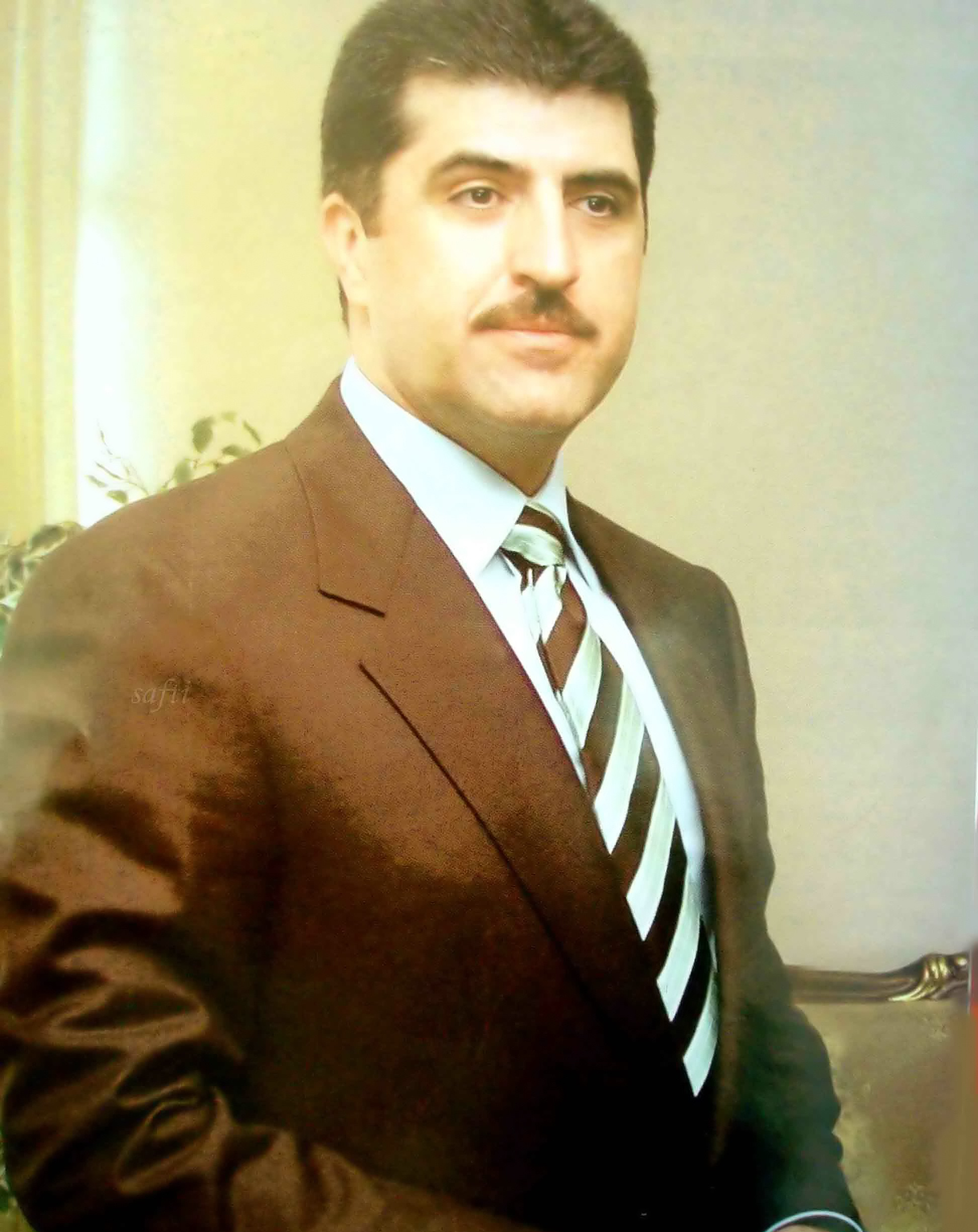

	First party	Second party
Leader	Nechervan Barzani	Ali Bapir
Party	DPAK	KIG
Last election	100	0
Seats won	104	6
Seat change	▲4	▲6
Popular vote	1,570,663	85,237
Percentage	89.55%	4.86%
Prime Minister before election
Nechervan Barzani (KDP)
Omar Hussein (PUK)
Elected Prime Minister
Nechervan Barzani
KDP

Parliamentary elections were held in the Kurdistan Region of Iraq on 30 January 2005 alongside national and governorate elections. They were the first parliamentary elections held in Kurdistan Region since 1992.

The Democratic Patriotic Alliance won 104 of the 111 seats in the National Assembly.

== Results ==
Party or alliance		Votes	%	Seats
Democratic; Patriotic; Alliance	Kurdistan Democratic Party	1,570,663	89.55	40
Democratic; Patriotic; Alliance	Patriotic Union of Kurdistan	1,570,663	89.55	38
Democratic; Patriotic; Alliance	Kurdistan Islamic Union	1,570,663	89.55	9
Democratic; Patriotic; Alliance	Turkmen Democratic Movement	1,570,663	89.55	4
Democratic; Patriotic; Alliance	Communist Party of Kurdistan – Iraq	1,570,663	89.55	3
Democratic; Patriotic; Alliance	Kurdistan Socialist Democratic Party	1,570,663	89.55	2
Democratic; Patriotic; Alliance	Assyrian Democratic Movement	1,570,663	89.55	2
Democratic; Patriotic; Alliance	Chaldean Cultural Society	1,570,663	89.55	1
Democratic; Patriotic; Alliance	Bet-Nahrain Democratic Party	1,570,663	89.55	1
Democratic; Patriotic; Alliance	Chaldean Democratic Union Party	1,570,663	89.55	1
Democratic; Patriotic; Alliance	Farmers Movement Party	1,570,663	89.55	1
Democratic; Patriotic; Alliance	Democratic National Union of Kurdistan	1,570,663	89.55	1
Democratic; Patriotic; Alliance	Independents	1,570,663	89.55	1
Democratic; Patriotic; Alliance	Total	1,570,663	89.55	104
Kurdistan Islamic Group		85,237	4.86	6
Kurdistan Toilers' Party and independents		20,585	1.17	1
Kurdistan Democratic Labor Party		11,748	0.67	0
Movement of the Democratic People of Kurdistan		10,953	0.62	0
Independent List		10,262	0.59	0
Iraqi Republican Group		9,499	0.54	0
Kurdistan Democratic Solution Party		9,081	0.52	0
Iraqi National Union Front		8,255	0.47	0
Kurdistan Democrats Movement		6,690	0.38	0
Kurdistan Conservative Party		5,506	0.31	0
Iraqi National Brotherhood Party		3,422	0.20	0
Kurdistan National Movement		2,018	0.12	0
Total		1,753,919	100.00	111
Valid votes		1,753,919	98.70	
Invalid/blank votes		23,067	1.30	
Total votes		1,776,986	100.00	
Source: eKurd, Parliament
