= 2013 Kurdistan Region parliamentary election =

- 21 September 2013

All 111 seats in the Kurdistan National Assembly 56 seats needed for a majority
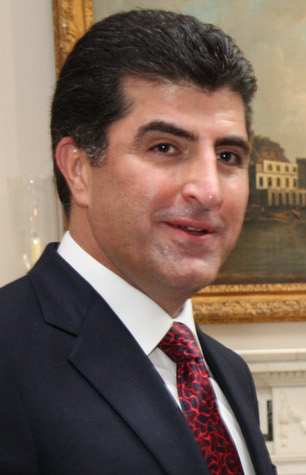

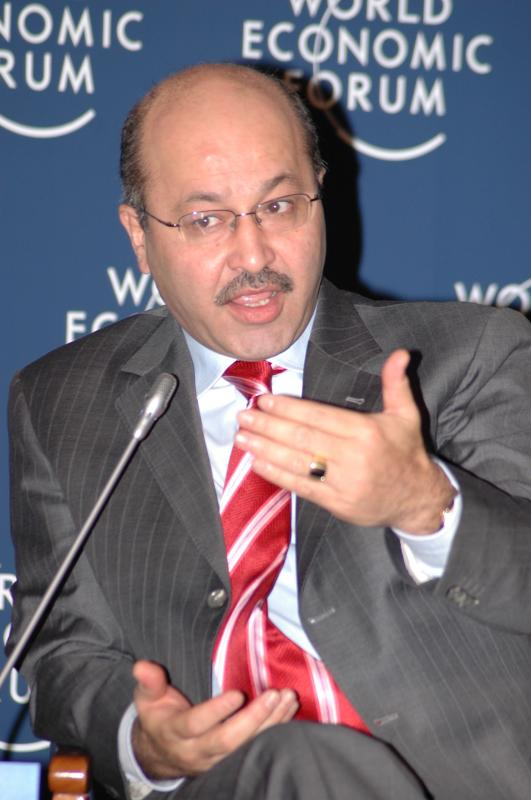
	First party	Second party	Third party
Leader	Nechirvan Barzani	Nawshirwan Mustafa	Barham Salih
Party	KDP	Gorran	PUK
Last election	30	25	29
Seats won	38	24	18
Seat change	▲8	▼1	▼11
Popular vote	743,984	476,736	350,500
Percentage	37.79%	24.21 %	17.80%
- The election took place in the red and pink areas .
Prime Minister before election
Nechirvan Barzani
KDP
Elected Prime Minister
Nechirvan Barzani
KDP

Parliamentary elections were held in the Kurdistan Region of Iraq on 21 September 2013. They were the fourth parliamentary elections in Kurdistan Region since 1992. The candidates were competing for a total of 111 seats out of which 11 seats were reserved for minorities. According to the Iraqi High Electoral Commission, there were 366 female and 736 male candidates for the elections.

A total of 2,653,743 people were eligible to vote throughout the three provinces of Erbil, Sulaymaniyah and Duhok of which 74% cast their ballots.

== Run-up ==
The legislative elections together with presidential and provincial were originally planned for September 21, but however, in the months leading to the elections the parliament extended Massoud Barzani’s term for another two years. Meanwhile, IHEC delayed the provincial elections until November 21. Under Kurdish election law, political parties were allowed to campaign from August 28 until September 17th, four days before voting. The Peshmerga and police voted on September 19, in order for them to be able to guard the voting polls on September 21.

The election marked the first time the Kurdistan Democratic Party (KDP) and the Patriotic Union of Kurdistan (PUK) were running as individual parties since 1992. The KDP was expected to win the most votes with the party having a strong backing in the provinces of Duhok and Erbil and no challengers. The Patriotic Union of Kurdistan meanwhile was facing competition from the Movement for Change. The Movement for Change had in the previous elections secured a surprising 25 seats in Sulaymaniyah, which had until then been a stronghold for the Patriotic Union of Kurdistan. The Patriotic Union of Kurdistan also faced uncertainty due to internal conflicts and the absence of its leader Jalal Talabani who was recovering from a stroke.

=== Clashes ===
On 5 September, a gunman opened fire on a campaign rally by the Movement for Change in the city of Sulaymaniyah, wounding one person. In the same week, clashes broke out between the opposition Movement for Change and the PUK and KDP supporters that led to 12 people, mostly policemen, being wounded.

== Notable participating parties ==
List No	Party	Kurdish Name	Party Leaders
101	Kurdistan Islamic Movement	بزوتنەوەی ئیسلامیی کوردستان; Bizûtinewey Îslamiy Kurdistan	Shaykh Uthman Abd-Aziz
102	Patriotic Union of Kurdistan	یەکێتیی نیشتمانیی کوردستان; Yekêtiy Nîştimaniy Kurdistan	Jalal Talabani
103	Kurdistan Conservative Party	پارتی پارێزگارانی کوردستان; Partî Parêzgaranî Kurdistan	Zaid Surchi
104	Kurdistan Islamic Group	کۆمەڵی ئیسلامی کوردستان-عێراق; Komelley Îslamiy Kurdistaê / Îraq	Ali Bapir
105	Kurdistan Islamic Union	یەکگرتووی ئیسلامیی کوردستان; Yekgirtûy Îslamiy Kurdistan	Mohammed Faraj
106	Reform and Development List	لیستی چاکسازی و گەشە; Lîstî Çaksazî u Geşe	
107	Communist Party of Kurdistan – Iraq (Freedom List)	ئازادی; Partî Azadî	Kamal Shakir
108	Future Party	ئایندە; Hizbî Ayinde	
109	Democratic National Union of Kurdistan	یەکێتی نەتەوەیی دیموکراتی کوردستان; Yekêtiy Neteweyiy Dîmukratî Kurdistan	
110	Kurdistan Democratic Party	Massoud Barzani	
111	Kurdistan Socialist Democratic Party	حزبی سۆسیالیست دیموکراتی کوردستان; Hizbî Sosyal Dîmukratî Kurdistan	Mohammad Hajji Mahmoud
113	Kurdistan Democratic Solution Party	پارتی چارەسەری دیموکراتی کوردستان; Partî Çareserî Dîmukratî Kurdistan	Diyar Gharib and Nadjibeh Umar
115	Third Direction	ئاڕاستەی سێیەم; Arrastey Sêyem	
116	People'e Rights' List	مافی گەل; Lîstî Mafî Gel	
117	Gorran Movement	گۆڕان; Bizûtinewey Gorran	Nawshirwan Mustafa
118	The Rights of People of Kurdistan	لیستی مافەکانی خەڵکی کوردستان; Mafekanî Xellkî Kurdistan	
119	The Independents	لیستی سەربەخۆکان; Serbexokan	
120	Turkmen Change and Renewal	گۆڕان و نوێبوونەوەی تورکمان; Gorran u Nwêbûnewey Turkman	
121	Erbil Turkmen List	لیستی ھەولێری تورکمانی; Lîstî Turkmanî Hewlêr	
122	Iraqi Turkmen Front	بەرەی تورکمانی عێراقی; Berey Turkmanî Êraq	Sadettin Ergeç
123	Turkmen Democratic Movement	لیستی بزووتنەوەی دیموکراتی تورکمان; Lîstî Bizûtinewey Dîmukratî Turkman	
124	Turkmen Development List	لیستی پێشکەوتووی تورکمان; Lîstî Pêşkewtûy Turkman	
126	Assyrian Democratic Movement	لیستی میسۆپۆتامیا; Kurranî Dû Rûbareke	Yonadam Kanna
127	Chaldean Syriac Assyrian United List	لیستی کۆمەڵەی کلدان و سریان و ئاشوورییەکان; Girdbûnewey Kildanî Siryanî Aşûrî	Sarkis Aghajan

== Results ==
No party won enough votes to form a government outright. The Kurdistan Democratic Party won the most votes in Erbil and Duhok. The province of Sulaymaniyah was heavily divided. The Movement for Change won the second most votes which made it the prime partner for the KDP to form a coalition with. The Patriotic Union of Kurdistan, unexpectedly, lost more than a third of its seats.

The Patriotic Union of Kurdistan announced that it respected the results and soon after the announcement, a high-ranking member of the party resigned and accepted responsibility for the results. Both Islamists and socialists made gains. A total of 77 men and 34 women were elected.

Party	Votes	%	Seats	+/–
Kurdistan Democratic Party	743,984	38.15	38	+8
Gorran Movement	476,173	24.42	24	–1
Patriotic Union of Kurdistan	350,500	17.97	18	–11
Kurdistan Islamic Union	186,741	9.58	10	+4
Kurdistan Islamic Group	118,575	6.08	6	+2
Kurdistan Islamic Movement	21,834	1.12	1	–1
Kurdistan Social Democratic Party	12,501	0.64	1	–1
Communist Party of Kurdistan – Iraq	12,392	0.64	1	0
Kurdistan Toilers' Party	8,681	0.45	1	+1
Future Party	3,868	0.20	0	–1
Kurdistan Democratic Solution Party	3,605	0.18	0	New
Rights of People of Kurdistan	2,817	0.14	0	0
Kurdistan Conservative Party	2,420	0.12	0	0
People's Rights List	2,005	0.10	0	New
Democratic National Union of Kurdistan	1,717	0.09	0	0
Reform and Development List	1,323	0.07	0	New
The Independents	868	0.04	0	New
Total	1,950,004	100.00	100	0
Turkmen minority reserved seats
Turkmen Development List	5,259	44.23	2	New
Erbil Turkmen	1,951	16.41	1	0
Turkmen Change and Renewal	1,926	16.20	1	New
Iraqi Turkmen Front	1,753	14.74	1	0
Turkmen Democratic Movement	1,002	8.43	0	–3
Total	11,891	100.00	5	0
Assyrian minority reserved seats
Assyrian Democratic Movement	6,345	48.19	2	0
Chaldean Syriac Assyrian Popular Council	5,730	43.52	2	–1
Sons of Mesopotamia	1,091	8.29	1	New
Total	13,166	100.00	5	0
Armenian minority reserved seats
Yervant Aminian	531	52.37	1	New
Aram Shahin Davud Bakoyan	227	22.39	0	–1
Ishkhan Arshak Kevorkian	197	19.43	0	New
Nubar Siban Gharib Qurban	59	5.82	0	New
Total	1,014	100.00	1	0
Source: Ekurd, Ishar TV

=== Results by governorate ===
Party	Sulaymaniyah	Erbil	Dohuk	Total
Kurdistan Democratic Party	92,500	340,668	310,816	743,984
Patriotic Union of Kurdistan	234,252	91,072	25,176	350,500
Gorran Movement	333,961	130,000	12,775	476,736
Kurdistan Islamic Union	84,081	46,000	56,660	186,741
Kurdistan Islamic Group	67,285	46,300	4,814	118,399
Others	6,401	52,448	33,566	92,415
Total:	818,480	706,488	443,807	1,968,775
