= President of the Kurdistan Region =

Head of state of the Kurdistan Region

- Seal of the President

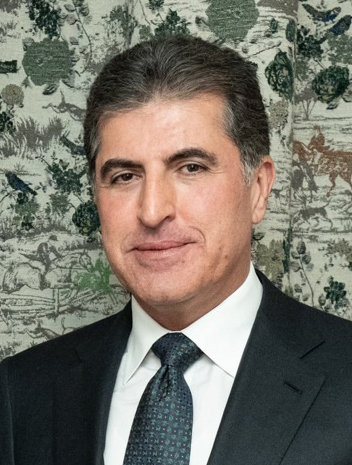
- Incumbent; Nechirvan Barzani since 10 June 2019
- Style: His Excellency
- Appointer: elected in KRG parliament (if possible)
- Term length: Four years, renewable once
- Inaugural holder: Jalal Talabani (de facto); Masoud Barzani (de jure)
- Formation: 4 July 1992 (de facto); 14 June 2005 (de jure)
- Deputy: Vice President of Kurdistan Region
- Website: presidency.gov.krd/en/

The president of the Kurdistan Region is the head of state of the semi-autonomous Kurdistan Region in northern Iraq. They are part of the Kurdistan Presidency Council and commander-in-chief of the Peshmerga. The current president of Kurdistan Region is Nechirvan Barzani, who assumed office on 10 June 2019.

== History ==
After the results of the 1992 parliamentary election, the Kurdistan Democratic Party (KDP) and the Patriotic Union of Kurdistan (PUK) with both parties holding 50 out of 100 seats, chose to create a unity government unrecognized by Ba'athist Iraq.

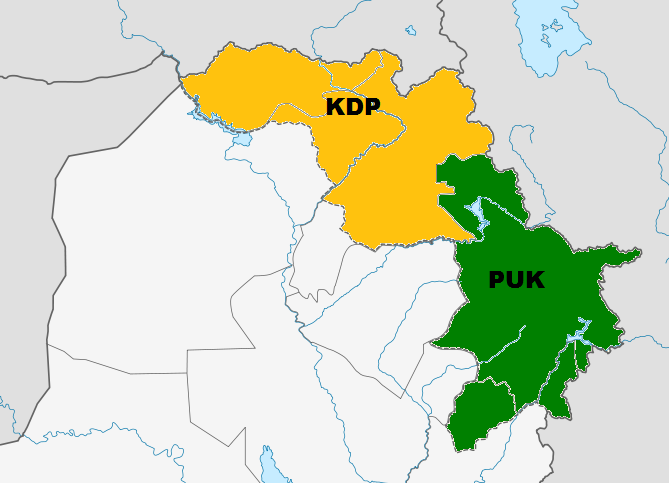
Kurdistan Region after the 1998 cease-fire. Green area controlled by the PUK, Yellow area controlled by the KDP

The unity government collapsed in 1994 and caused the Iraqi Kurdish Civil War to break out that ended in 1998. This resulted in the establishment of two Kurdistan Regional Governments, a KDP-controlled one in Erbil and a PUK-controlled one in Sulaymaniyah, each with their own president.

After an official reconciliation between the KDP and PUK in October 2002, parliamentary elections were then held on 30 January 2005 and on 14 June 2005 the KDP-leader Masoud Barzani was sworn in by the parliament in as new president and Kosrat Rasul Ali as the new vice president. In 2009, the system was then changed to elect the president and on 25 July 2009 presidential elections were held resulting in Barzani's re-election. On 29 October 2017, amidst the 2017 Iraqi–Kurdish conflict, Barzani announced his intentions to step down as president on November 1st.

== List of Presidents ==
=== President of the PUK-run Kurdistan Regional Government ===
No.	Portrait	Name (Birth–Death)	Term of office			Political party
No.	Portrait	Name (Birth–Death)	Took office	Left office	Time in office	Political party
1		Jalal Talabani (1933–2017)	4 July 1992	6 April 2005	12 years, 276 days	Patriotic Union of Kurdistan

=== President of the KDP-run Kurdistan Regional Government ===
No.	Portrait	Name (Birth–Death)	Term of office			Political party
No.	Portrait	Name (Birth–Death)	Took office	Left office	Time in office	Political party
1		Masoud Barzani (born 1946)	19 May 1992	14 June 2005	13 years, 26 days	Kurdistan Democratic Party

=== President of the Kurdistan Region ===
No.	Portrait	Name (Birth–Death)	Term of office			Political party
No.	Portrait	Name (Birth–Death)	Took office	Left office	Time in office	Political party
1		Masoud Barzani (born 1946)	14 June 2005	1 November 2017	12 years, 140 days	Kurdistan Democratic Party
2		Nechirvan Barzani (born 1966)	10 June 2019	Incumbent	7 years, 106 days	Kurdistan Democratic Party

== Election results ==
2009 Kurdistan Region presidential election

Candidate	Popular votes	Percentage
Massoud Barzani	1,266,397	69.6
Kamal Mirawdily	460,323	25.3
Halow Ibrahim Ahmed	63,377	3.5
Ahmed Mohammed Rasul	18,890	1.4
Hussein Garmiyani	10,665	0.6
Total	1,819,652	100%

- 1992 Kurdistan Region general election
- 2009 Kurdistan Region parliamentary election
- 2013 Kurdistan Region parliamentary election
- 2018 Kurdistan Region parliamentary election
- 2024 Kurdistan Region parliamentary election

== See also ==
- Politics of Kurdistan
- Vice President of the Kurdistan Region
- Prime Minister of the Kurdistan Region
