= KDSP =

KDSP may refer to:

- Kurdistan Democratic Solution Party
- KDFD, a radio station (760 AM) licensed to serve Thornton, Colorado, United States, which held the call sign KDSP from 2015 to 2019
- KVOQ (FM), a radio station (102.3 FM) licensed to serve Greenwood Village, Colorado, which held the call sign KDSP from 2010 to 2015
