= National Coalition (disambiguation) =

The National Coalition is a coalition of opposition groups in the Syrian Civil War that was founded in Doha, Qatar, in November 2012.

National Coalition may also refer to:

- In El Salvador, the National Coalition Party (El Salvador)
- In Finland, the National Coalition Party (Finnish: Kansallinen Kokoomus)
- In Iraqi Kurdistan, the National Coalition (Iraqi Kurdistan) (Kurdish: ھاوپەیمانیی نیشتمانی, romanized: Hawpeymaniyî Nîştimanî)
- In Ireland, the Government of the 20th Dáil, a Fine Gael and Labour Party coalition government
- In the Philippines, Koalisyong Pambansa (National Coalition)

== See also ==
- National Government (United Kingdom), sometimes referred to as the National Coalition
