= 2024 Kurdistan Region parliamentary election =

- 20 October 2024

Total of 100 seats of the Kurdistan Region Parliament 51 seats needed for a majority
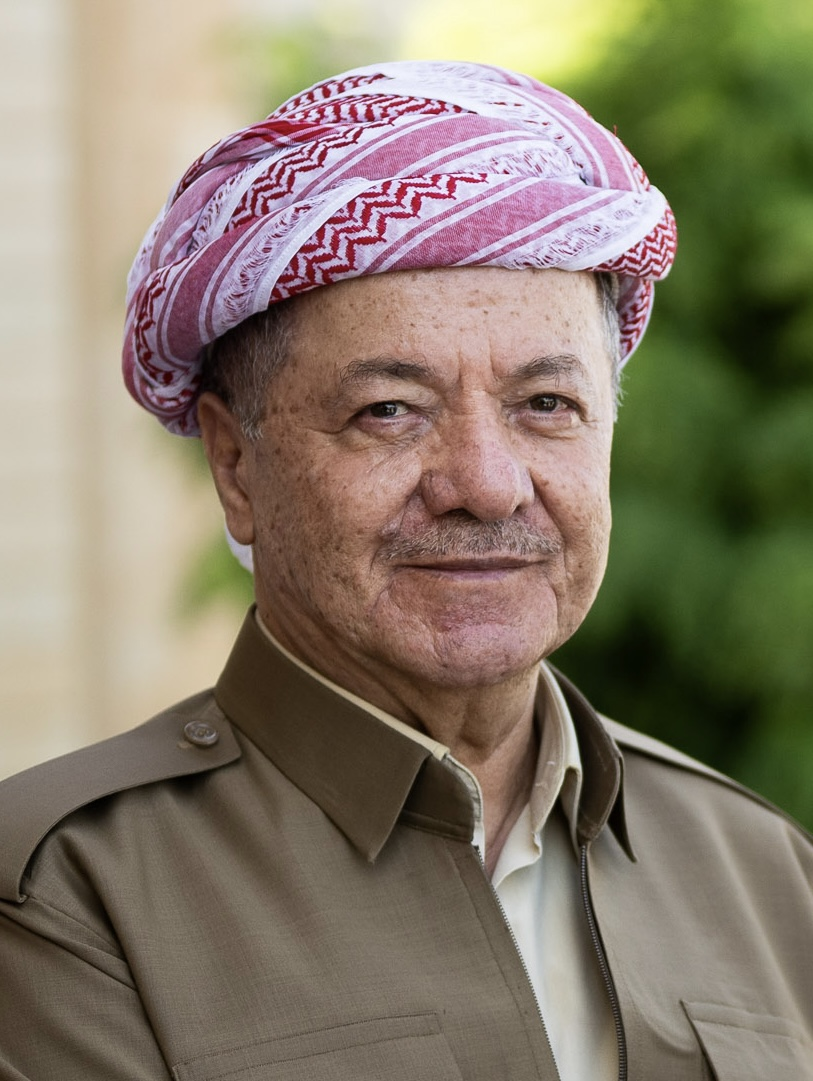

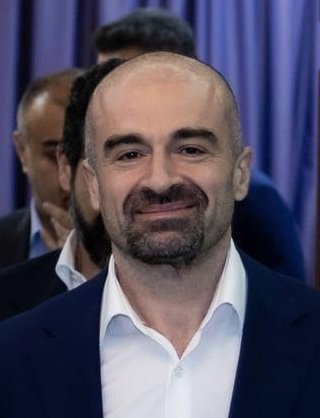

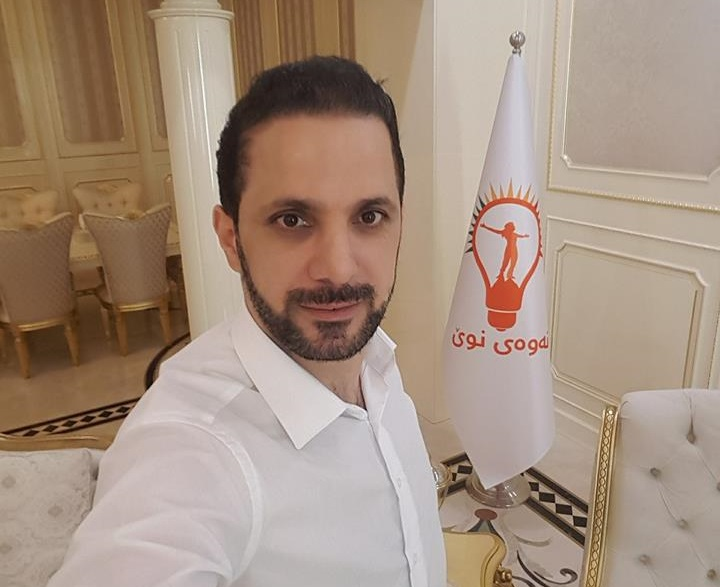
	First party	Second party	Third party
Leader	Masoud Barzani	Bafel Talabani	Shaswar Abdulwahid
Party	KDP	PUK	NGM
Last election	45	21	8
Seats after	39	23	15
Seat change	▼6	▲2	▲7
Popular vote	809,197	408,141	290,991
Percentage	43.15%	21.77%	15.52%
	Fourth party
Leader	Salahaddin Bahaaddin
Party	KIU
Last election	5
Seats after	7
Seat change	▲2
Popular vote	116,981
Percentage	6.24%
- Results by governorates
Prime Minister before election
Masrour Barzani
KDP
Elected Prime Minister
TBD

The 2024 Kurdistan Region parliamentary election was held on 20 October 2024. Seats to the Kurdistan Region Parliament were elected. The results of the elections were announced on 21 October 2024, by the Independent High Electoral Commission in Baghdad.

== Background ==
The 2024 parliamentary elections were held after a two year delay. In February 2024, the Supreme Court of Iraq issued verdict No. 83 revoking and amending a number articles of the Kurdistan Region’s election law (Law No. 1, 1992). Most notably, the verdict included dismantling the 11 seats reserved for minorities, reducing the parliamentary seats from 111 to 100, and designating the Iraqi Independent High Electoral Commission (IHEC) to oversee the elections instead of Kurdistan Region’s electoral commission, as well as redefining the region’s electoral system. The Iraqi Supreme Judicial Council's elections branch subsequently ordered IHEC to allocate five out of 100 seats to minorities; three to Christians (2 Assyrian, 1 Armenian) and two to Turkmen. Women must comprise at least 30% of elected members.

In terms of the changes to the electoral system, the verdict redefined the law so that members are elected by open-list proportional representation using the Hare quota in four electoral districts corresponding to the region's four governorates, instead of one district: Duhok, Erbil, Halabja and Sulaymaniyah.

== Participation ==
There are 2,899,578 eligible voters. A total of two alliances, 13 parties and 124 independent candidates took part in the election.

== Results ==
Party	Votes	%	+/–	Seats	+/–
Kurdistan Democratic Party	809,197	43.15	▼0.95	39	▼6
Patriotic Union of Kurdistan	408,141	21.77	▲1.27	23	▲2
New Generation Movement	290,991	15.52	▲7.32	15	▲7
Kurdistan Islamic Union	116,981	6.24	▲1.14	7	▲2
Kurdistan Justice Group	64,710	3.45	▼3.55	3	▼4
National Stance Movement	55,775	2.97	New	4	New
People's Front	33,365	1.78	New	2	New
Kurdistan Region Coalition	13,199	0.70	▼0.8	1	▼1
Gorran Movement	11,621	0.62	▼11.38	1	▼11
Babylon Movement	7,399	0.39	Quota	1	New
Sardam Coalition	6,163	0.33	New	0	–
Kurdistan Islamic Movement	5,503	0.29	New	0	–
Turkmen Reform Party (Muna Kahveci)	3,664	0.20	Quota	1	0
Kurdistan Islamic Relations Movement	1,799	0.10	New	0	–
Iraqi Turkmen Front	1,725	0.09	New	0	▼1
National Coalition	1,228	0.07	New	0	–
Independents	43,729	2.33	–	3	–
Total	1,875,190	100.00	–	100	–
Registered voters/turnout	2,899,578	72%			
Source: Kurdistan24 (1, 2) Shafaq, Reuters Rûdaw IHEC

=== Results by governorate ===
Erbil Governorate
Party	Votes	%	Seats
Kurdistan Democratic Party	347,786	51.96	17
Patriotic Union of Kurdistan	111,102	16.60	6
New Generation Movement	104,222	15.57	5
Kurdistan Islamic Union	24,178	3.61	1
Kurdistan Justice Group	20,265	3.03	1
National Stance Movement	16,871	2.52	1
People's Front	9,776	1.46	1
Christian quota candidate	6,753	1.01	1
Turkmen quota candidate	3,666	0.55	1
Others	24,654	3.68	0
Total	669,273	100.00	34
Source: IHEC

Sulaymaniyah Governorate
Party	Votes	%	Seats
Patriotic Union of Kurdistan	257,359	41.10	15
New Generation Movement	136,447	21.79	8
Kurdistan Democratic Party	57,916	9.25	3
Kurdistan Islamic Union	42,687	6.82	3
Kurdistan Justice Group	36,707	5.86	2
National Stance Movement	29,416	4.70	2
People's Front	20,355	3.25	1
Gorran Movement	9,736	1.55	1
Kurdistan Region Coalition	8,399	1.34	1
Christian quota candidate	6,203	0.99	1
Turkmen quota candidate	5,664	0.90	1
Others	15,335	2.45	0
Total	626,224	100.00	38
Source: IHEC

Duhok Governorate
Party	Votes	%	Seats
Kurdistan Democratic Party	402,152	73.38	18
New Generation Movement	46,631	8.51	2
Kurdistan Islamic Union	42,732	7.80	2
Patriotic Union of Kurdistan	28,557	5.21	1
National Stance Movement	8,438	1.54	1
Christian quota candidate	5,535	1.01	1
Others	13,970	2.55	0
Total	548,015	100.00	25
Source: IHEC

Halabja Governorate
Party	Votes	%	Seats
Patriotic Union of Kurdistan	12,530	32.18	1
Kurdistan Islamic Union	7,847	20.15	1
Kurdistan Democratic Party	4,940	12.69	1
Others	13,619	34.98	0
Total	38,936	100.00	3
Source: IHEC

=== Special votes ===
On 18 October a "Special voting" round took place for members of the ministries of Peshmerga and Internal Security. with 215,560 eligible voters and 208,521 votes cast (a turnout of 97%). The votes were counted from 21:00 to 23:00 GMT+3, on 18 October 2024.

==== Results ====
Party	Votes	%
Kurdistan Democratic Party	82,979	47.66
Patriotic Union of Kurdistan	51,345	29.49
New Generation Movement	11,207	6.44
Kurdistan Islamic Union	2,885	1.66
National Stance Movement	2,492	1.43
Kurdistan Justice Group	2,391	1.37
People's Front	2,110	1.21
Babylon Movement	844	0.48
Gorran Movement	705	0.40
Kurdistan Region Coalition	311	0.18
National Coalition	44	0.03
Other	16,794	9.65
Total	174,107	100.00
Valid votes	174,107	86.73
Invalid/blank votes	26,646	13.27
Total votes	200,753	100.00
Registered voters/turnout	215,560	93.13
Source: Rûdaw

== Parties ==
Liberals and centre-left:

- Gorran Movement
- Kurdistan Laborers' Party
- National Coalition
- National Stance Movement
- New Generation Movement
- Patriotic Union of Kurdistan
- People's Front

Leftists:

- Communist Party of Kurdistan – Iraq
- Kurdistan Society's Freedom Movement
- Kurdistan Social Democratic Party
- Kurdistan Toilers' Party
- Movement of the Democratic People of Kurdistan

Islamists:

- Kurdistan Islamic Movement
- Kurdistan Islamic Union
- Kurdistan Justice Group

Secular Conservatives and Centre-Right:

- Kurdistan Conservative Party
- Kurdistan Democratic Party

Minorities:

- Babylon Movement
- Iraqi Turkmen Front
- Turkmen Reform Party

== Technical difficulties ==
The election used electronic voting ballot machines which often malfunctioned and failed to detect voters' fingerprints. In Erbil, a number of would-be voters were unable to participate due to the issue.
