= Nahla Hussain al-Shaly =

Iraqi politician (1973–2008)

Personal details
- Born: 1973
- Died: 18 December 2008 (aged 36–37) Kirkuk
- Cause of death: Killed by gunmen
- Party: Communist Party of Kurdistan
- Spouse: Bakir Al Shaly
- Children: 2
- Occupation: Political activist

Nahla Hussain al-Shaly (Arabic: نهلة حسين الشالي, b. 1973– December 18, 2008) was a promoter of women's rights in Iraqi Kurdistan, and the leader of the Kurdistan Women's League, the women's wing of the Kurdistan Communist Party. On December 18, 2008, she was shot and decapitated after gunmen stormed her home in Kirkuk. Hussain, a married mother of two, was 35 at the time she was killed. At her death, her children were aged 9 and 10 years old.
