= Kurdistan List =

Electoral coalition

Kurdistan List ليستی كوردستان / Lîstî Kurdistani
- State of Law Coalition Logo Logo for the list as used in the Kurdistan Elections in 2009
- Leader: Barham Salih
- Founded: 2009
- Dissolved: 2013
- Preceded by: Democratic Patriotic Alliance of Kurdistan
- Ideology: Kurdish nationalism

The Kurdistan List (Kurdish: لیستی كوردستان Lîstî Kurdistani), also known as the Kurdistan Alliance or the Brotherhood List, was the name of the electoral coalition that ran in the Kurdistan Regional Government parliamentary elections in Iraqi Kurdistan in July 2009. The Kurdistan List represented a coalition of the two main ruling parties in Iraqi Kurdistan, namely the Kurdistan Democratic Party and the Patriotic Union of Kurdistan. It is the successor of the Democratic Patriotic Alliance of Kurdistan.

The head of the Kurdistan List was the former deputy prime minister of Iraq, Dr. Barham Salih (PUK), who was later elected as the new prime minister of Iraqi Kurdistan in September 2009. The Kurdistan List endorsed the incumbent and re-elected president of Kurdistan, Massoud Barzani (KDP).

== 2010 Iraqi elections ==
In the 2010 Iraqi parliamentary election there were 11 parties in the Kurdistani List, the largest ones were the:

- Kurdistan Democratic Party - led by Kurdish President Massoud Barzani
- Patriotic Union of Kurdistan- led by Iraqi President Jalal Talabani
- Kurdistan Communist Party – Iraq - led by Kamal Shakir
- Islamic Movement of Kurdistan - led by Shaykh Uthman Abd-Aziz
- Kurdistan Toilers' Party - led by Qadir Aziz
- Turkmen Brotherhood Movement - led by Kalkhi Najmaddin Noureddin
- Kurdistan Socialist Democratic Party

=== Seats ===
Governorate	Kurdistan Democratic Party	Patriotic Union of Kurdistan	Total Kurdistan List	Total Governorate Seats
Diyala	0	1	1	13
Duhok	8	1	9	10
Erbil	8	2	10	14
Kirkuk	2	4	6	12
Nineveh	6	2	8	31
Sulaymaniyah	2	6	8	17
Compensatory seats	0	1	1	7
Total:	26	17	43	325

=== Votes ===
Governorate	Kurdistani List Votes	Percentage	Total votes
Babylon	1,167	0.21%	556,123
Baghdad	19,732	0.93%	2,129,557
Duhok	332,951	76.23%	413,964
Dhi Qar	334	0.06%	557,774
Diyala	47,749	9.33%	469,087
Erbil	458,403	67.02%	648,924
Kirkuk	206,542	38.10%	472,453
Muthanna	1,432	0.64%	222,851
Najaf	524	0.14%	378,854
Nineveh	239,109	20.52%	1,013,635
Qādisiyyah	805	0.23%	353,086
Saladin	21,776	4.82%	451,409
Sulaymaniyah	350,283	42.22%	769,302
Total:	1,681,714	14.37%	10,813,216
