= Kurdistan Women's League =

Kurdistan Women's League (Kurdish: کۆمەڵەی ئافرەتانی کوردستان, Arabic: رابطة نساء كوردستان) is a women's organization in Iraqi Kurdistan, tied to the Kurdistan Communist Party. Nahla Hussain al-Shaly, the leader of the organisation, was murdered in 2008.
