= Jalal Dabagh =

Iraqi politician (born 1939)

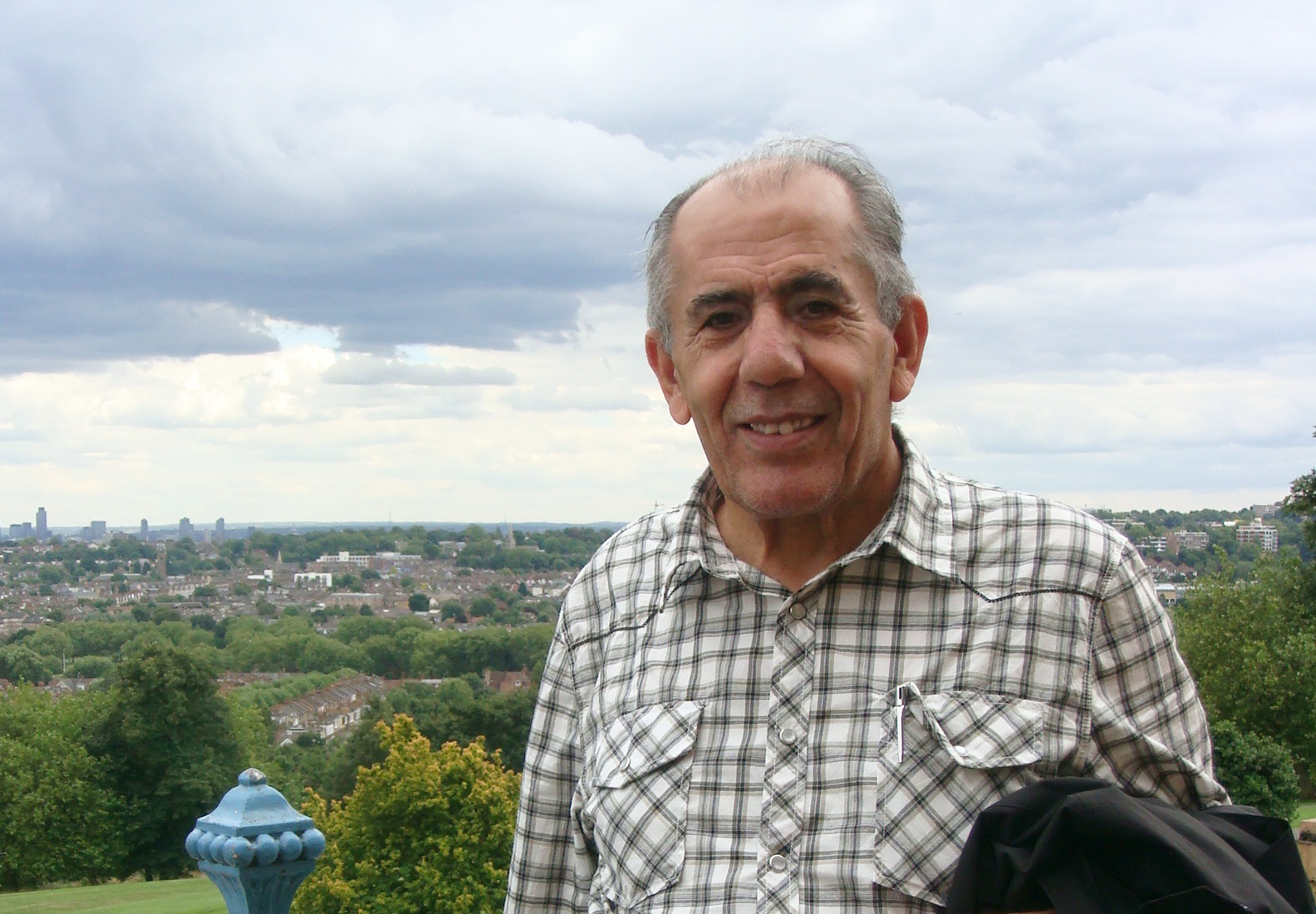
- Dabagh in 2010

Pensioner

Personal details
- Born: 12 May 1939 (age 87) Sulaymaniyah, Kingdom of Iraq
- Party: Communist Party of Kurdistan
- Spouse: Fawzia
- Children: 4
- Occupation: teacher, author, journalist, Peshmerga fighter

Jalal Dabagh (Kurdish: Celal Debax, جەلال دەباغ) (born 12 May 1939) is an Iraqi Kurdish politician and writer.

== Biography ==
Dabagh was born on 12 May 1939, in Silêmanî. He is one of nine children, five sons and four daughters.

He received his compulsory and senior high school education in Silêmanî, where he also went on study at a teachers' training college.

In 1959, Dabagh started working as a teacher at a compulsory school in Silêmanî. Thereafter, in 1962, he went to Romania for three years studying social science at Bucharest Institute of Social Science.

He advanced his social science studies in Moscow (USSR) between 1974 and 1976.

From 1970 to 1977, he was one of the board members of the Kurdish Writers Union, for which he was the administrative secretary 1970-74.

As one of the Kurdish representatives he attended the 5th conference of Afro-Asian Writers' Union 4–9 September 1973 in Alma-Ata, Kazakhstan (then one of the republics of the USSR).

Dabagh is fluent in Kurdish and Arabic, he speaks or understands conversational Swedish, English, Romanian and Persian.

In addition, Jalal Dabagh worked as a journalist for over 25 years.

Jalal Dabagh was the party leader for the Left Party in the Kurdistan region of Iraq (south Kurdistan)

Was a candidate for the Iraqi parliament in 2010.

Dabagh was a member of The Association for Pêşmerge Dêrînekan of Kurdistan, which is an association for the veteran Kurdish fighters. The purpose of the association is to preserve the rights of former fighters and also function as a forum for discussing the present and the future of Kurdistan.

== Translation works ==
- The Communist Manifesto – first Kurdish language translation.

Published in: 1996 and 2001

- Raparini Kurdan 1925

Dabagh translated Manvel Arsenovic Gasratjan's Kurdy Turcsii v novejsee vremja (Kurdish: Raparini Kurdan 1925) to Kurdish. Raparini Kurdan 1925 is about the 1925 Sheikh Said rebellion, led by Sheikh Said.

Published in: 2006

- 'Karma'

He has also translated Diagnostics of Karma to Kurdish. written by Sergey N. Lazarev. Which educates about alternative therapies with karma in focus.

Published in: 2006

- Wa Bahar Hat

A novel written by Haci Jindey, freely translated to "Now comes the Spring" was translated to Kurdish by Dabagh.

- Pîawêkî Nabîn

Pîawêkî Nabîn (A Blind Man) is a manuscript originally written by Khalil Gibran

- Tawawy Nusînakanî Fahd

Tawawy Nusînakanî Fahd is the collected works of Yusuf Salman Yusuf, also known merely as Fahd. It was translated to Kurdish by Jalal Dabagh.

Published in: 2001.

Other notable translations are Freedom Road, about the lives of former slaves during Reconstruction, and Marxism Philosophy and the first Kurdish translation of "The Internationale".

=== Written ===
- Hacî Qadirî Koyî

Hacî Kaderî Koyey, freely translated in English to Hajji Kader from Koye.

Published in: 2009.

- Goranî Serkawtin

Freely translated to Songs of Victory is a collection of poems.

Published in: 1998.

- 28 Estêre le Asmanî Nemrîda

Freely translated to 28 Stars in the Sky of the Immortal.

Published in: 1985.

- La Dafterî Geshtekî Regay Jîanewe

Freely translated to Diary from Road of Life.

Published in: 1978.

- Jîan û Tekoşanî Dîmitrov

Freely translated to Life and Struggle of Dimitrov is about the Bulgarian Communist leader Georgi Dimitrov.

Published in: 1973.

== See also ==
- List of Kurdish scholars
