= Kurdistan Islamic Relations Movement =

Kurdistan Islamic Relations Movement بزووتنەوەی پەیوەندیی ئیسلامیی کوردستان
- Leader: Kamîlî Hacî Elî
- Founder: Kamîlî Hacî Elî
- Founded: 16 March 2024; 2 years ago
- Split from: Kurdistan Islamic Movement
- Ideology: Islamism
- Political position: Right-wing
- Religion: Sunni Islam
- Seats in the Kurdistan Region Parliament: 0 / 111

Party flag

The Kurdistan Islamic Relations Movement (Kurdish: بزووتنەوەی پەیوەندیی ئیسلامیی کوردستان, romanized: Bizûtineweyî Peywendîyî Îslamîyî Kurdistan) is a Kurdish Islamist party founded on 16 March 2024, as a split-off from the Muslim Brotherhood-affiliated Kurdistan Islamic Movement. The faction led by Kamîlî Hacî Elî had left this party following the party's congress in October 2023. On the foundational congress in Silêmanî, where about 1,100 people were present, the new party decided to prepare to participate in the upcoming 2024 Kurdistan Region parliamentary election. The party claims to have over 2,000 members. The party ran in the 2024 Kurdistan Region parliamentary election and won 1,799 votes, 0.08% of total votes cast.
