= People's Front (Kurdistan Region) =

People's Front بەرەی گەل Bereyî Gel
- Leader: Lahur Sheikh Jangi
- Founded: 17 January 2024; 2 years ago
- Split from: Patriotic Union of Kurdistan
- Council of Representatives of Iraq: 0 / 329
- Kurdistan Region Parliament: 2 / 100

The People's Front (Kurdish: بەرەی گەل, romanized: Bereyî Gel), is a political party in the Kurdistan Region that was founded by the former co-chair of the Patriotic Union of Kurdistan (PUK), Lahur Şeyx Cengî.

The party received its license from the interior ministry on 17 January 2024. On its founding congress in Hewlêr on 14 March 2024, about 160 members participated, electing leadership council of 13 persons. The party claims "serving the Kurdish people, freedom of opinion and civil rights" as their core values, as well as equality and democracy.

For the 2024 Kurdistan Region parliamentary election, Lahur Şeyx Cengî is heading the party's list in Silêmanî Governorate. Şaduman Mela Hesen, his close associate since before the PUK leadership crisis, is heading the list in Hewlêr Governorate. In Duhok Governorate, the ex-PUK member Zikrî Zêbarî is heading the list. In total, the party's list has 115 candidates, 56 of which are in Silêmanî, 40 in Hewlêr, 17 in Dihok and 2 in Helebce. In total, 115 candidates are running for the People's Front.

Other prominent candidates include Pêşrew Heme Can, brother of the ex-PUK politburo member Qadir Heme Can and vice president of the University of Silêmanî. Also running for the People's Front is Ednan Usman, a former MP of the Gorran Movement, and Dr. Tiwana Mehemed Necim Talebanî.

== Background ==
After the founder and leader of the Patriotic Union of Kurdistan (PUK), Celal Talebanî, died in 2017, a struggle for the leadership of the party ignited between Celal's son Bafil Talebanî and the then co-president Lahur Şeyx Cengî. On the PUK's fourth congress in December 2019, Şeyx Cengî received the most votes for the General Leadership Council. In a compromise, he and Bafil were proclaimed co-presidents. In July 2021, Bafil shut down a media outlet close to Şeyx Cengî and ousted several important commanders from the counter-terrorism and intelligence units of the PUK, who were seen as affiliates of him. Shortly after, Bafil was declared the sole leader of the party. In November, Lahur Şeyx Cengi was expelled from the PUK along a few others and Bafil took full control over the party's finances. Şeyx Cengî filed a lawsuit against the expulsion. In February 2023, a court in Hewlêr ruled that the ouster from the co-presidency contradicted PUK's internal regulation and reinstated him. A day after however, on February 21, the judicial authority on Iraqi elections in Baghdad declared Bafil Talebanî the sole leader of the PUK. After that, Şeyx Cengî proceeded to work on founding his own party.

== Election results ==
=== Council of Representatives elections ===
Election	Leader	Votes	%	Seats	+/–	Position	Government
2025	Lahur Sheikh Jangi	21,008	0.19%	0 / 329	New	▲47th	Extra-parliamentary
