= National Coalition (Kurdistan Region) =

National Coalition ھاوپەیمانی نیشتمانی Hawpeymanî Nîştimanî
- Abbreviation: CDJ
- Leader: Karzan Luqman
- Spokesperson: Bakhtyar Gharib
- Founder: Barham Salih
- Founded: 2 October 2017; 9 years ago
- Split from: Patriotic Union of Kurdistan
- Headquarters: Sulaymaniyah, Kurdistan Region
- Ideology: Kurdish nationalism Social democracy Self-determination; Reformism; Anti-corruption
- Political position: Centre-left
- Council of Representatives of Iraq: 0 / 328
- Kurdistan Region Parliament: 0 / 100

Website
- https://hawpaimany.com/ku/

The National Coalition (Sorani Kurdish: ھاوپەیمانی نیشتمانی, romanized: Hawpeymanî Nîştimanî), founded by Barham Salih under the name Coalition for Democracy and Justice (Sorani Kurdish: ھاوپەیمانی بۆ دیموکراسی و دادپەروەری, romanized: Hevpeymana Demokrasî û Dadwerîyê, Arabic: الائتلاف من أجل الديمقراطية والعدالة, romanized: al-Ittihad min ajil ad-Dimuqratiyah wal-'Adalah) is a Kurdish political party in the Kurdistan Region.

In September 2017, Salih announced that he was leaving the PUK and forming a new opposition party, the Coalition for Democracy and Justice which competed in the 2018 Iraqi parliamentary election. Following the death of PUK leader Jalal Talabani and the Kurdish opposition leader Nawshirwan Mustafa, the alliance was seen to have the potential to change the Kurdish political landscape. He said he hoped to gather all the other opposition parties, including Gorran and Komal, to challenge the governing KDP–PUK alliance. In the 2018 Iraqi parliamentary election, it won two seats.

== Salih's return to PUK and restructuring of the party ==
On September 19, 2018, Barham Salih left the party to rejoin the Patriotic Union of Kurdistan, which nominated him as a candidate for Iraq's Presidency. Others joined Salih in his return to PUK, but the party leadership made clear that it would not be going to disband itself. Instead, the party affirmed that it will continue to focus on "Kurdish unity and overcoming the economic crisis". A conference was announced to be held soon. However, it didn't participate in the 2018 Kurdistan Region parliamentary election.

On 9 November 2018, the party held a conference, where it renamed itself to National Coalition and elected Aram Qadir as its leader. There were some legal problems, which were solved at the beginning of December, when the Independent High Electoral Commission moved to legally dissolve the no longer existing CDJ. The party announced that it promotes religious coexistence, good governance, the consolidation of democracy and justice as well as the freedom of thought and expression. It also distanced itself from clientelist patronage politics, claiming it "will not become a political shop for personal and family interests."

== As National Coalition ==
The party boycotted the 2018 Kurdistan Region parliamentary election and failed to win a seat in the 2021 Iraqi parliamentary election.

In December 2022, the party went through a crisis, when a group claiming to be part of the leadership spoke to the press, announcing they had removed Aram Qadir from the position as party leader and stripped him of his membership, arguing that the party devolved under his leadership, into one without program or headquarters. This was refuted by the party's spokesman, who affirmed that Qadir is still the party's president, that the group didn't have the authority to make this decision and that the individuals are neither well-known within the party, nor hold any positions. However, according to the media network Draw, this decision was made by the political, executive and representant councils of the party. The crisis dragged on, as in December 2023, conflict broke out between Qadir and the interim leadership opposing him, caused by questions over the second congress that the party was going to hold.

The party enlisted to run in the 2024 Kurdistan Region parliamentary election. In March 2024, the spokeswoman Şatîn Qeredaxî declared the party's support for the protests by public servants who hadn't been paid their salary for months. Qeredaxî argued, that the Kurdistan Regional Government would use withholding the salaries as a means to put pressure on the government in Baghdad, but would just end up putting pressure on the ordinary citizens. Shortly after during the spring of 2024 the National Coalition elected a new leader during a leadership meeting electing Karzan Luqman. On the 4th of November 2025 during the 2025 Iraqi parliamentary elections the National Coalition announced that they support the Patriotic Union of Kurdistan where the National Coalition stated on their official Facebook page that the PUK can help the current situation of how the people will be able to live in Iraq in the future.

== NC congresses ==
The National Coalition has held four congresses, these occurred in 2017, 2018, 2018 and 2023.

During the 2nd Congress of the National Coalition, held in Sulaymaniyah, the National Coalition had in the presence of more than 500 candidates

== Leaders ==
- Barham Salih (2017–2018)
- Aram Qadir (2018–2024)
- Karzan Luqman (2024–present)
