= Kurdistan Laborers' Party =

Kurdistan Laborers' Party پارتی ڕەنجدەرانی کوردستان Partî Rencderanî Kurdistan
- Logo of the party
- Abbreviation: PRK
- Leader: Bapîr Kamela
- Founded: 1995
- Ideology: Kurdish nationalism Social democracy
- Political position: Centre-left
- Council of Representatives of Iraq: 0 / 328
- Kurdistan Region Parliament: 0 / 111

The Kurdistan Laborers' Party (Kurdish: پارتی ڕەنجدەرانی کوردستان, romanized: Partî Rencderanî Kurdistan, abbreviated as PRK) is a political party in Kurdistan Region that was founded in 1995 as Kurdistan Workers' and Laborers' Party (Kurdish: پارتی کرێکاران و ڕەنجدەرانی کوردستان, romanized: Partî Krêkaran û Rencderanî Kurdistan). The name and logo change happened some point after June 2021, but it still regularly being referred to with the old name. The party's secretary is Bapîr Kamela.

In 2017, the party merged with another small party called Kurdistan Masses Movement (Kurdish: بزووتنەوەی جەماوەری كوردستان, romanized: Bizûtineweyî Cemawerî Kurdistan), but the name Kurdistan Workers' and Laborers' Party and the leadership of Kamela was kept.

On 7 October 2023, party leader Bapîr Kamela was part of a delegation from Kurdistan Region visiting Turkish President Recep Tayyip Erdoğan in Ankara.

For the 2024 Kurdistan Region parliamentary election, the party joined an electoral alliance together with the Democratic National Union of Kurdistan and the Kurdistan Conservative Party. The alliance is called Serdem Coalition.
