= Kurdistan Democratic Solution Party =

Political party active in Iraq's Kurdistan Region

Kurdistan Democratic Solution Party Partî Çareserî Dîmukratî Kurdistan
- Abbreviation: PÇDK
- Leader: Diyar Garip; Necibe Ömer
- Founded: 2002; 24 years ago
- Dissolved: 2015; 11 years ago
- Succeeded by: Kurdistan Society's Freedom Movement
- Ideology: Communalism; Democratic confederalism Jineology; Democratic socialism
- Political position: Left-wing
- Regional affiliation: Koma Civakên Kurdistan
- Colors: Green
- Seats in the Council of Representatives of Iraq: 0 / 325
- Seats in the Kurdistan Region Parliament: 0 / 111

Party flag
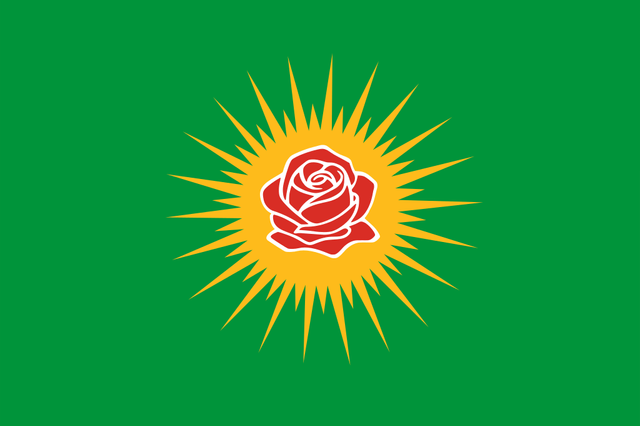

Website
- pcdk.org

The Kurdistan Democratic Solution Party or PÇDK (Kurdish: Partî Çareserî Dîmukratî Kurdistan), was an illegal political party active in Iraq's Kurdistan Region, founded in 2002 and disbanded in 2015. It is part of the Kurdistan Communities Union (KCK), along with the larger Kurdistan Workers' Party (PKK).

It has not been as successful as its sister parties, such as the PKK in Turkish Kurdistan and the Democratic Union Party (PYD) in Syrian Kurdistan. The Kurdistan Democratic Party (KDP) closed down PÇDK headquarters and the party was banned in the Kurdistan Region, but it continued to operate.

The party contested the 2005 and 2009 Kurdistan Region parliamentary elections but failed to win any seats.

The party likewise participated in the parliamentary elections of Kurdistan held on 21 September 2013, winning 3,605 votes (0.18%, no representatives elected). In the approach to the elections the PÇDK had been denied a license to operate due to pressure from Turkey, but in the end they were able to take part in the elections.

On 20 May 2014, members had been taken into custody by security forces of the KDP during operations against different opposition organisations in the cities of Erbil, Dohuk, and Zakho. The operations were justified by the banning of the party some days before, after a demonstration in front of the Kurdistan Region Parliament organised by the PÇDK to commemorate a massacre of PKK members by the KDP in Erbil in 1997, during the Iraqi Kurdish Civil War. PÇDK dissolved itself in 2015 and it was succeeded by Kurdistan Society's Freedom Movement.

== Positions and international relations ==
=== Positions ===
As feminism was a part of the party's ideology, it had the highest number of female candidates of all parties in Kurdistan during the parliamentary elections in 2013. According to the director of the election office of the PÇDK, Hassan Judi, it is one of the major goals that women's participation won't be below 50%. In 2013, the party's list was headed by a woman, Najiba Mahmood.

Even if the party denies that it is a front organisation for the PKK fighters, it admits a shared ideology with them. The central person in the leftist Kurdish movement of the PKK and offshoots is Abdullah Öcalan. Historically a Marxist organisation, the party re-evaluated its ideology with the end of the Soviet Union. Today the party is, amongst other influences, democratic socialist and follows the works of Abdullah Öcalan as the PKK does.

=== International relations ===
Although the PKK is seen as a terrorist organisation in the United States, the PÇDK is neutral towards America. "We used to consider the U.S. as the greatest of all imperialist powers. We were a Marxist organization dedicated to a socialist future. But after the Soviet Union collapsed we began a process of re-evaluating Marxism, and PKK leader Abdullah Ocalan indeed wrote several books on this subject," said the former leader of the party, Fayaq Golpi. He added that "in an era of globalization, you cannot ignore real[i]ties. We then went for democracy and federalism instead. After the liberation of Iraq and the removal of Saddam Hussein, so many things changed-especially the issue of the USA."

The party's relations with Turkey are very negative, since there are many ties between the PKK and the PÇDK. Fearing that the PÇDK could be able to gain power in Kurdistan and turn the land even more into a stronghold of the PKK (the PKK operates mainly in the Kandil mountains and on the front against ISIL), the Turkish government has pushed the KRG to prevent a rise of the PÇDK, which led to the PÇDK being denied licenses during elections and the resolution of the party's headquarters.

The PÇDK for its part accused Turkey and the ruling AKP in a statement at the end of 2011 of planning a massacre of the Kurdish people using chemical and other prohibited weapons and fighting without any ethical principles. The party also claimed that "international communities, institutions and so-called democratic states have been silent in the face of it." They appealed to the Peshmerga forces to accomplish their national duty and protect the Kurds in Turkey from being massacred.

== See also ==
- Kurdistan Workers' Party
- Democratic Union Party
- Kurdistan Free Life Party
