= Democratic Patriotic Alliance of Kurdistan =

- Founded: 2005
- Dissolved: 2009
- Succeeded by: Kurdistan List
- Ideology: Kurdish nationalism

The Democratic Patriotic Alliance of Kurdistan (DPAK) sometimes referred to simply as the Kurdistan Alliance (KA) is the name of the electoral coalition first presented as a united Kurdish list in the January 2005 election in Iraq. Elections were held simultaneously for the assembly of Kurdistan Region. The Alliance represents a coalition of the two main Kurdish parties, the Kurdistan Democratic Party and the Patriotic Union of Kurdistan

- Kurdistan Democratic Party
- Patriotic Union of Kurdistan
- Kurdistan Islamic Union
- Communist Party of Kurdistan – Iraq
- Kurdistan Toilers' Party
- Kurdistan Democratic Socialist Party
- Democratic National Union of Kurdistan
- Chaldean Democratic Union Party
- Iraqi Turkmen Brotherhood Party

The alliance received 1,570,665 votes to the Kurdistan National Assembly, or 90% of the vote. At the federal level, the DPAK took close to 26% of the vote and won 75 seats out of 275 in the Iraqi National Assembly. They were able to secure the selection of Jalal Talabani (the PUK leader) as President of Iraq, while Massoud Barzani (KDP leader) became President of Kurdistan Region.
