= Independent High Electoral Commission =

Election commission of Iraq

Coordinates: 31°19′2″N 45°16′58″E

- المفوضية العليا المستقلة للانتخابات کۆمیسیۆنی باڵای سەربەخۆی ھەڵبژاردنەکان
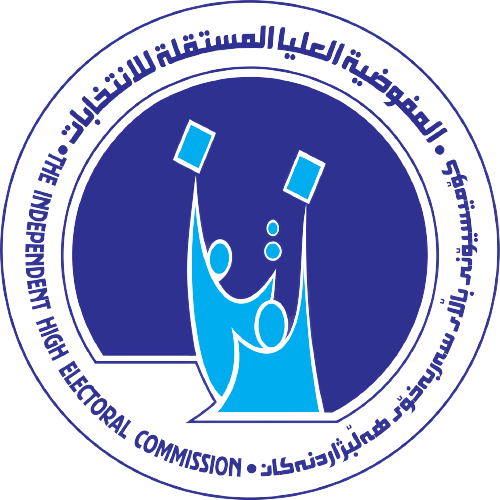

Agency overview
- Formed: May 1, 2004
- Jurisdiction: Iraq
- Headquarters: 14th of July Street, Baghdad
- Agency executive: Judge Jalil Adnan, CEO
- Website: ihec.iq

The Independent High Electoral Commission (IHEC) (Note: Arabic: المفوضية العليا المستقلة للانتخابات; Kurdish: کۆمیسیۆنی باڵای سەربەخۆی ھەڵبژاردنەکان) is Iraq's electoral commission. The electoral commission is headed by a nine-member board. Seven of those members are voting and must be Iraqi citizens. IHEC is currently headed by Judge Jalil Adnan Khalaf.

== History ==
It was set up in May 2004 by the Coalition Provisional Authority (CPA) as the Independent Election Commission of Iraq (IECI) by CPA Order 92 as the exclusive electoral authority in Iraq to begin work towards holding an election in the country. In 2007 the IECI was renamed the Independent High Electoral Commission (IHEC) in accordance with Law 11 (2007) of the Council of Representatives of Iraq (COR).

In the 2005 election, the expert was Colombian Carlos Valenzuela. The current Chief Electoral Officer is Adil Lami. The commission set up and ran the January 2005 Iraqi parliamentary election as well as the simultaneous elections for provincial governments and the Kurdistan Region Parliament.

== Procedure ==
Little is known about the commission, its procedures, organization, composition, or acts. The commission receives lists of candidates to ban from the Council of Representatives Accountability and Justice Commission.

It also set up the voting places in fourteen nations outside of Iraq. The Commission is also tasked with dealing with complaints about the election.

== International Support ==
The IECI gained support from several US, UN, and NGO programs including:

- USAID
- UN Election Assistance Mission in Iraq
- CEPPS
- International Foundation for Electoral Systems
