= Kurdistan Society's Freedom Movement =

Political party in the Kurdistan Region of Iraq

Kurdistan Society's Freedom Movement تەڤگەری ئازادیی کۆمەڵگەی کوردستان
- Abbreviation: Tevgerî Azadiyî
- Leader: Tara Husên; Selam Ebdulla
- Founded: 17 October 2014; 12 years ago
- Ideology: Communalism; Democratic confederalism Jineology; Libertarian socialism
- Political position: Left-wing
- Colors: Red
- Seats in the Council of Representatives of Iraq: 0 / 325
- Seats in the Kurdistan Region Parliament: 0 / 111

Website
- tavgar.com

The Kurdistan Society's Freedom Movement or Tevgerî Azadiyî (Kurdish: تەڤگەری ئازادیی کۆمەڵگەی کوردستان, romanized: Tevgerî Azadiyî Komelgeyî Kurdistan), is a registered political party active in the Kurdistan Region of Iraq. It was founded in 2014 in Silêmanî and received an official license in 2018. In the Kurdistan Region, however, they applied for a license but didn't receive an answer from either the Silêmanî Governorate or the interior ministry of the region.

The party's slogan is "Democracy, gender equity, environmental protection". At the third party congress in July 2022 in Silêmanî, over a thousand members were reportedly present.

== Assassinations of party members and repression ==
The party repeatedly faced assassinations and repression from authorities. On 25 October 2016, the party claimed that security forces in Zakho confiscated the house of Hesen Salih Zaxoyî, a member of the party leadership, and arrested him alongside two of his sons and a guest.

In November 2018, the Kurdistan Regional Government ordered the closure of all party offices in Silêmanî and Halabja Governorates, as well as in Raperîn and Germiyan. The decision was justified by the closure of any offices of parties without official license in the Kurdistan Region. The party criticized however, that they had handed in all required documents for receiving a license to the authorities, but not received any answer. The party also claimed that their members would be subjected to harassment from security forces on a daily base, including extrajudicial arrests.

In March 2019, the party offices in Silêmanî were reopened after talks between the party and security officials. In 2024 however, the party met for a talk with the chair of the Iraqi Supreme Judicial Council, Fayeq Zedan, because of the ban on its activities in the governorates Silêmanî and Erbil.

In September 2019, the party again criticized that the security forces of the Kurdistan Democratic Party have been arresting, interrogating and prosecuting its members in Bahdinan and Soran. They also claimed the KDP-controlled security would pressure members to leave the party and stop to criticize the occupation of Turkey in the north of the region. The party called this restriction of political freedoms as an alarming step towards dictatorship and sees it as an act of pandering to Turkey.

In 2022, Suheyl Xurşîd Ezîz, a member of the party's executive council and employee of the local agricultural authority, was shot dead with several bullets by an unknown assailant in front of his home in Kifri, a town in the Disputed territories of northern Iraq.

On 18 January 2024, the party member Feryal Silêman Xalid was assassinated in the city of Kirkuk. The woman, who was born in Syria, was killed by an unknown assailant on a motor bike. The following day, the party released a statement calling on the security forces to arrest the attacker and said that the Islamic State and Turkey had conspired to massacre Kurds, also referring to an assassination carried out by the IS against a police officer in Kirkuk a few days earlier.

== Positions and statements ==
=== Ideology ===
About the relationship with the Kurdistan Workers' Party, co-chair Tara Husên said that Tevgerî Azadiyî is an independent party that does not receive decisions from any other party. However, Husên also confirmed that the party is influenced by the philosophy of Abdullah Öcalan.

=== Domestic politics and societal issues ===
According to co-chair Tara Husên, core values of the party are centered around gender equality and environmentalism. The party also wants to distance itself from most nationalist forces, as it considers a diverse society with different communities as a positive factor. The party also strives to achieve "self-government" of the people after the ideals of Democratic confederalism. It sees an important role of women and the youth in this political struggle, as these groups wouldn't get any leadership roles in the established parties and would instead only receive empty promises. Tara Husên also describes Tevgerî Azadiyî as not being a classical political party but rather a "socio-political movement".

The concluding statement of the party conference in Kirkuk 2022 included aims like the promotion of a system of democratic decentralization, combatting violence against women and supporting female leadership and self-organization as well as protection of the environment, historical monuments and holy shrines. Because of marginalization, joblessness and loss of hope among the younger population, causing many of them to emigrate, Tevgerî Azadiyî has a particular focus on reaching and organizing this milieu of people. The party also announced support for enlarging green spaces in cities and buying local to help the rural population.

At a congress by members in Europe in 2023, the party warned about the dangerous and growing societal influence of Islamism, which it sees as manifested by the Muslim Brotherhood, the Islamic State and Salafism. It accuses these groups of fostering a hateful mentality in the society that targets women and the rights and freedoms of the people in general. The party also stated that it supports cooperation with all parties committed to freedom and democracy, the release of the imprisoned Abdullah Öcalan and the societal liberation of women.

=== Regional conflicts ===
In March 2020, the party commemorated the Halabja massacre of 1988, which it sees as part of what it calls a genocide against the Kurds. The root causes of this it sees in the mentality of ethnocentrism fostered by nation states and argues that the same mentality also caused the Yazidi genocide in Şingal, the massacres in Cizre and the historical Sur district of Diyarbakir, the Turkish occupation of Afrin and marginalization of Kurds in Kirkuk.

On a speech at a party conference in Kirkuk 2022, Komel Sermed, co-chair of the party in the city accused Iraq of leading a policy of Arabization in Kirkuk, claiming that Kurdish villages in the surrounding land would be evacuated after threats and then settled with Arabs. He also accused Turkey and the Iraqi Turkmen Front of trying to turkify Kirkuk's historical landmarks.

In March 2024, the party released a statement in which it called the Turkish state fascist and criticized the Kurdistan Democratic Party as collaborators. It called on the Iraqi state to stop the crimes of Turkish forces and punish those who collaborate with it.

=== Protests ===
The party announced support for the demands of the 2020 Kurdish protests in Sulaymaniyah Governorate and condemned the violent response of the security forces, accusing the KRG of unwise, undemocratic and neglectful to its people. It referred to the killed protesters as martyrs and said that it shares the grief of their families.

Equally during the students' protests 2021, co-chair Tara Husên said on a press conference in Silêmanî that the party supports the protesters' demands. She accused the KRG of being responsible for the situation of the students and called on the authorities to release the detained protesters as soon as possible. Husên also lauded the tenaciousness of the students despite their economic misery and said that they are informed enough to insist on their demands because they know who is responsible. Tevgerî Azadiyî also demanded, that the student's grants should not only be kept but increased and that students should be allowed to form independent councils to represent themselves.

== Electoral activities and alliances ==
In the 2018 Iraqi parliamentary election, the party had run on a list together with the New Generation Movement. This alliance was not repeated in the 2021 Iraqi parliamentary election. Yusra Receb Kemir, an MP who was expelled from the parliamentary faction of the New Generation in 2020, was running as an independent in the 2021 elections and along three other independent candidates was endorsed by Tevgerî Azadiyî.

In the 2023 Kirkuk governorate election, the party called on its supporters to vote for the united electoral list of the Patriotic Union of Kurdistan and the Kurdistan Communist Party - Iraq. It also stressed the importance that all would Kurds participate in the elections, as the elections also serve as a historical document of the ethnic makeup of the Kirkuk Governorate.

== 1 September 2023 Erbil attack controversy ==
On 1 September 2023, a bombing in took place on a pedestrian bridge in Erbil. There were no casualties or wounded persons, but material damage occurred. The security council of the Government of Kurdistan Region called this an "act of terrorism" and claimed that Zalil Jalil Khalaf, a member of Tevgerî Azadiyî from Chamchamal would be responsible. The party however denied the accusations, stating that the perpetrator unknown to them and has nothing to do with them. In the statement, it also accused the KRG of trying to deflect from the ongoing protests by teachers and other public servants for receiving months of yet unpaid salaries. It stressed that it is a licensed party in Iraq that carries out its political and civil struggle for democratization within the framework of the law.
