= Communist Party of Kurdistan – Iraq =

Communist Party of Kurdistan – Iraq حزبی شيوعى كوردستان – عيراق
- Leader: Kawa Mahmud
- Founded: 1993
- Split from: Iraqi Communist Party
- Headquarters: Erbil, Kurdistan Region
- Women's wing: Kurdistan Women's League
- Ideology: Communism; Kurdish nationalism
- National affiliation: Kurdistan List (Before 2013)
- International affiliation: IMCWP
- Colors: Red
- Council of Representatives of Iraq: 0 / 329
- Kurdistan Region Parliament: 1 / 111

Party flag
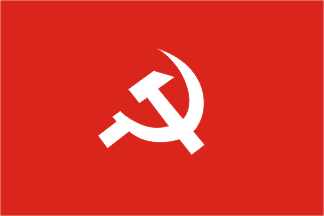

Website
- www.regaykurdistan.com

The Communist Party of Kurdistan – Iraq (Kurdish: حزبی شیوعی كوردستان - عیراق, romanized: Hizbî Şiyuî Kurdistan – Îraq, alternatively written as Partiya Komunîst a Kurdistanê, Arabic: الحزب الشيوعي الكردستاني – العراق) is a Kurdish political party, formed in October 1993 when the Iraqi Communist Party branch in the Kurdish areas was formed into a separate party. The party is led by Kawa Mahmud.

In both the January and December 2005 Iraqi legislative elections the party was part of the Democratic Patriotic Alliance of Kurdistan. The party has a women's wing, the Kurdistan Women's League, whose leader Nahla Hussain al-Shaly was murdered in Kirkuk in 2008. It also has an Assyrian wing called the Kaldo-Ashur Communist Party based in Ankawa.

Kawa Mahmud became the party's secretary general, after his predecessor, Kemal Şakir, stepped down on 27 October 2017.

== Positions and statements ==
=== On wars in the NAWA region ===
In November 2020, politburo member Ebdulrehman Faris warned of a "war among brothers" and that the regional countries would always have conspired against the Kurds. He also said that any Kurdish party causing internal tension between Kurdish parties should be condemned. In that regard, criticized KDP chairman Masoud Barzani's statement, that the Kurdistan Workers' Party would be responsible for destruction and war in the Kurdistan Region and should leave it. If the PKK would be an occupier in parts of the region, Faris argued, what then would be the buildup of Turkish troops and dozens of military bases in the region. He also highlighted the PKK's efforts of defeating the Islamic State in Kirkuk, Şingal and Makhmur.

Again in 2021, the party issued a statement regarding the Turkish operation at Gare mountain against PKK fighters, calling it an aggression and occupation by the Turkish Armed Forces. In October 2023, the KCP criticized both the Turkish airstrikes against civilian targets in Rojava and the Israeli attack on Gaza after the October 7 assault by Hamas, calling both Turkey and Israel "occupying states". The party also called for the establishment of a no-fly zone in northern Syria and on the international community to make efforts to protect the rights of both the Kurdish and Palestinian people.

On 12 February 2024, the KCP released a statement, in which Turkey, Iran and "militia groups" were called out for attacks on the Kurdistan Region and for inflicting demographic change in the disputed territories of northern Iraq. In that regards to the security in the Kurdistan Region, the party spoke about a dangerous phenomenon of "anonymous killings, femicides, suicides, arrests of journalists and civil activists" as well as obstacles to their efforts.

=== On elections in Iraq and the Kurdistan region ===
On 29 July 2023, the KCP called on the Kurdish parties to overcome their differences for the 2023 Iraqi governorate elections in the Disputed territories of northern Iraq and form an unified list. The party stressed a 'historical responsibility' to protect the unity of the Kurdish people, especially in the areas outside of the control of the autonomous Kurdistan region. It criticized the Kurdistan Democratic Party for refusing to form an alliance with the Patriotic Union of Kurdistan.

On 26 October 2023, Kawa Mahmud called on elections in the Kurdistan Region to be held as soon as possible, as the regional parliament and provincial councils had been dissolved by the federal court, as the mandate had ended. This, Mahmud argued, would be a threat to Kurdistan, in particularly because of unpaid salaries and oil exports the region is dependent on. To overcome this crisis, he called on cooperation between all Kurdistani parties.

=== On protests and social issues ===
On 5 February 2024, the KCP tried to hold a protest in Erbil in support of the protesting teachers who had not received their salaries for months. This triggered a massive buildup of security forces around the party's headquarters. In reaction, the party released a statement, saying the authorities are violating civil rights, are stealing the money from the citizens and should step down from power. They rejected the official reasoning of "security concerns" for not receiving the permission for their march demanding the full payment of the salary of teachers, civil servants and pensioners. As the security forces had hindered the protest from reaching its destination, the party had instead decided to hold the speeches in front of its headquarters.

On 12 February 2024, the party spoke of a worldwide "capitalist economic crisis" putting stress on the middle class and claimed that the lack of alternative programs for justice and equality has led to the rise of dangerous ideologies such as Nazism and radical Islamism.

== Cooperation with other parties ==
The party is part of the so-called Joint Working Committee of the Left of Kurdistan, alongside the Kurdistan Toilers' Party and the Movement of the Democratic People of Kurdistan. Said committee released a statement in August 2022, calling on the elimination of "absolute centralism" in Iraq, as well as the adoption of a separate constitution for the Kurdistan Region and the elections for the Kurdistan Region Parliament and the regional councils to be held on time. Furthermore, the statement calls on the government to stop further privatizations, to provide the salaries of public servants on time and to adopt reforms that improve the economic and social development of the people of Kurdistan.

== Electoral activities ==
Election year	# of overall votes	% of overall vote	# of overall seats won	+/–	Notes
2013	12,392	0.6% (#8)	1 / 111	1	Crossbench
2018	8,063	0.5% (#8)	1 / 111	1	Crossbench

In the 2023 Kirkuk governorate election, the Kurdistan Communist Party Alongside The Patriotic Union of Kurdistan formed The Kirkuk is our strength and will Coalition. This alliance also received endorsement from the Kurdistan Society's Freedom Movement.

For the 2024 Kurdistan Region parliamentary election, the party joined an electoral alliance together with the Kurdistan Toilers' Party and the Kurdistan Social Democratic Party. The alliance is called the Kurdistan Region Coalition.
