= Prime Minister of the Kurdistan Region =

Head of the Kurdistan Regional Government in Iraq

- Political Emblem

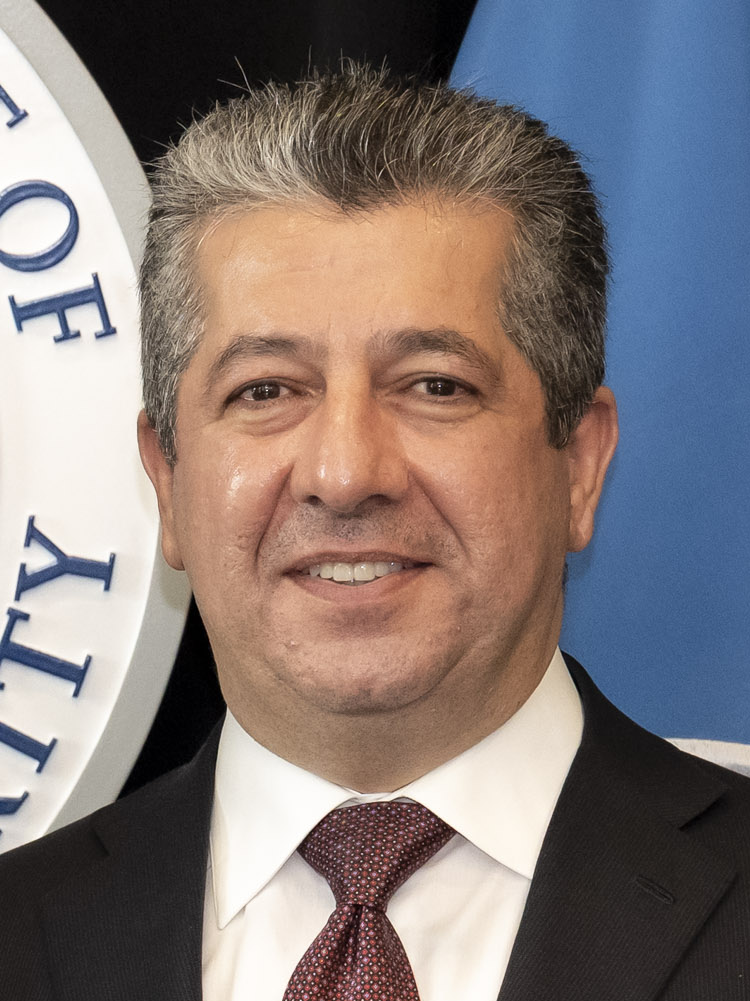
- Incumbent; Masrour Barzani since 10 June 2019
- Appointer: Kurdistan Region Parliament
- Term length: Four years, renewable
- Inaugural holder: Fuad Masum (de facto); Nechirvan Barzani (de jure)
- Formation: 4 July 1992 (de facto); 1 March 2006 (de jure)
- Deputy: Deputy Prime Minister of the Kurdistan Region
- Website: www.krg.org

The prime minister of the Kurdistan Region is the head of government of the Kurdistan Region, governing semi-autonomous Kurdistan Region in northern Iraq. The government is elected as part of the Kurdistan Region Parliament.

== List of prime ministers ==
=== 1992–2005 ===
After the 1992 parliamentary election resulted in the two main parties, the Kurdistan Democratic Party (KDP) and the Patriotic Union of Kurdistan (PUK), each holding 50 out of 100 seats, they decided to create a unity government (which was not recognized by the Ba'athist Iraq, led by Saddam Hussein).

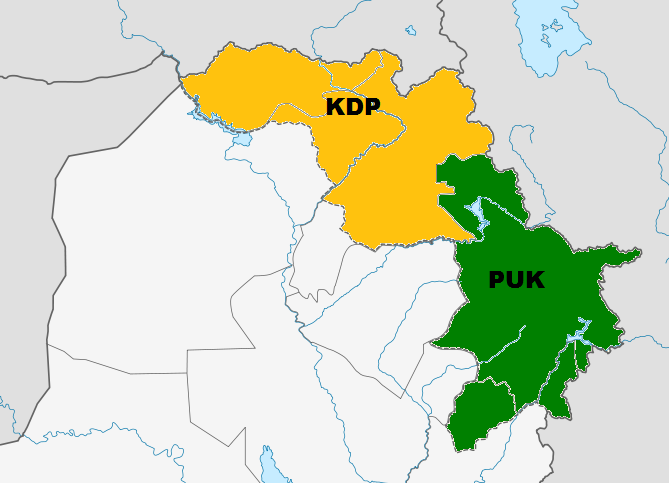
Iraqi Kurdistan after the 1998 cease-fire. Green area controlled by the PUK, Yellow area controlled by the KDP

The unity government soon collapsed and in 1994 a civil war broke out, which lasted until 1998. This resulted in the establishment of two Kurdistan Regional Governments in 1996, a KDP-controlled one in Erbil and a PUK-controlled one in Sulaymaniyah, each with their own prime minister.

==== PUK-controlled part ====
Prime Ministers of the PUK-controlled Kurdistan Regional Government:

No.	Portrait	Name (Birth–Death)	Term of office			Political party
No.	Portrait	Name (Birth–Death)	Took office	Left office	Time in office	Political party
1		Fuad Masum (born 1938)	4 July 1992	26 April 1993	296 days	Patriotic Union of Kurdistan
2		Kosrat Rasul Ali (born 1952)	26 April 1993	21 January 2001	7 years, 270 days	Patriotic Union of Kurdistan
3		Barham Salih (born 1960)	21 January 2001	15 July 2004	3 years, 176 days	Patriotic Union of Kurdistan
4		Omer Fattah Hussain (born 1948)	15 July 2004	14 June 2005	334 days	Patriotic Union of Kurdistan

==== KDP-controlled part ====
Prime Ministers of the KDP-controlled Kurdistan Regional Government:

No.	Portrait	Name (Birth–Death)	Term of office			Political party
No.	Portrait	Name (Birth–Death)	Took office	Left office	Time in office	Political party
1		Roj Shaweis (1947–2021)	26 September 1996	20 December 1999	3 years, 85 days	Kurdistan Democratic Party
2		Nechirvan Barzani (born 1966)	20 December 1999	14 June 2005	5 years, 176 days	Kurdistan Democratic Party

=== 2006–present ===
After the reconciliation between the KDP and PUK, parliamentary election was held on January 30, 2005, and an agreement was made to let a KDP leader become the Prime Minister for the first term and a PUK leader to become the Prime Minister for the second term, so Nechervan Barzani became prime minister. Barham Salih held the post of prime minister until 17 January 2012 after which he relinquished his position to Nechervan Idris Barzani.

Prime Ministers of the Kurdistan Regional Government:

No.	Portrait	Name (Birth–Death)	Term of office			Political party
No.	Portrait	Name (Birth–Death)	Took office	Left office	Time in office	Political party
1		Nechirvan Barzani (born 1966)	1 March 2006	31 August 2009	3 years, 183 days	Kurdistan Democratic Party
2		Barham Salih (born 1960)	1 September 2009	17 January 2012	2 years, 138 days	Patriotic Union of Kurdistan
(1)		Nechirvan Barzani (born 1966)	17 January 2012	10 June 2019	7 years, 144 days	Kurdistan Democratic Party
3		Masrour Barzani (born 1969)	10 June 2019	Incumbent (Term Expired in October 2024)	7 years, 113 days	Kurdistan Democratic Party

== See also ==
- President of Kurdistan Region
- Vice President of Kurdistan Region
