= Nechirvan Barzani =

President of the Kurdistan Region of Iraq (born 1976)

His Excellency Nechirvan Barzani
- نێچیرڤان بارزانی
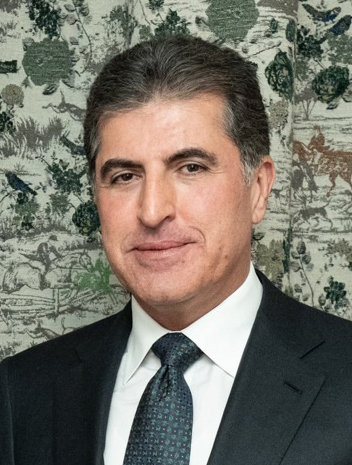
- Barzani in 2025

2nd President of Kurdistan Region
- Incumbent
- Assumed office 10 June 2019
- Prime Minister: Masrour Barzani
- Vice President: Jaafar Sheikh Mustafa; Mustafa Said Qadir
- Preceded by: Masoud Barzani

Prime Minister of Kurdistan Region
- In office 7 March 2012 – 10 June 2019
- President: Masoud Barzani
- Preceded by: Barham Salih
- Succeeded by: Masrour Barzani
- In office 1 March 2006 – 31 August 2009
- President: Masoud Barzani
- Preceded by: Position established
- Succeeded by: Barham Salih
- In office 20 December 1999 – 14 June 2005
- President: Masoud Barzani
- Preceded by: Rowsch Shaways
- Succeeded by: Position abolished

Personal details
- Born: Nechirvan Idris Barzani; 21 September 1966 (age 60) Barzan, Erbil Governorate, Iraqi Republic
- Party: Kurdistan Democratic Party
- Spouse: Nabila Barzani
- Relations: Masrour Barzani (cousin)
- Children: 5
- Parent: Idris Barzani (father)
- Education: University of Tehran

Nechirvan Idris Barzani (Kurdish: نێچیرڤان بارزانی, romanized: Nêçîrvan Barzanî; born 21 September 1966) is a Kurdish politician serving as the second President of the Kurdistan Region. He was elected into office by the Kurdistan Region Parliament in June 2019. Nechirvan Barzani was appointed as Vice President of the Kurdistan Democratic Party since 2010. He previously served as Prime Minister of the Kurdistan Regional Government from March 2007 to August 2009 and March 2012 to May 2019. Nechirvan Barzani is also the founder of the University of Kurdistan Hewlêr.

== Early years ==
Nechirvan Barzani was born in 1966 in Barzan, Kurdistan Region. The name Nêçîrvan means hunter. Barzani's surname originates from his birthplace of Barzan. He is the grandson of Mustafa Barzani, the founder of the Kurdistan Democratic Party (KDP).

== Education and personal life ==
Nechirvan Barzani studied politics and international relations at the University of Tehran, Iran. He is fluent in Kurdish, Persian, and English. He is married to Nabila Barzani and they have five children: Idris, Cheyavan, Danyal, Ranya and Maya.

== Political career ==
Nechirvan Barzani was first elected to the KDP central committee at its tenth Congress in 1989 and re-elected at the 11th Congress in 1993, when he assumed a position in the political bureau. After the 1991 Gulf War, he participated in negotiations with the Iraqi government.

In 1996, Nechirvan Barzani was appointed Deputy Prime Minister of the Kurdistan Region.

=== Prime Minister (2006–2009) ===
In March 2006, Nechirvan Barzani lead the fifth cabinet, the first unified cabinet of the Kurdistan Regional Government. Many of Barzani's supporters believe that he played an important role in developing the Kurdistan Region. During his first term as prime minister, his supporters nicknamed his cabinet as "The Development Cabinet" praising his work in the development of the Kurdistan Region. From September 2009 through January 2012, a Kurdish politician from the ruling KDP–PUK coalition, Barham Salih, assumed office as Prime Minister of the KRG.

=== Prime Minister (2012–2019) ===
Nechirvan Barzani was re-elected as prime minister in 2012.

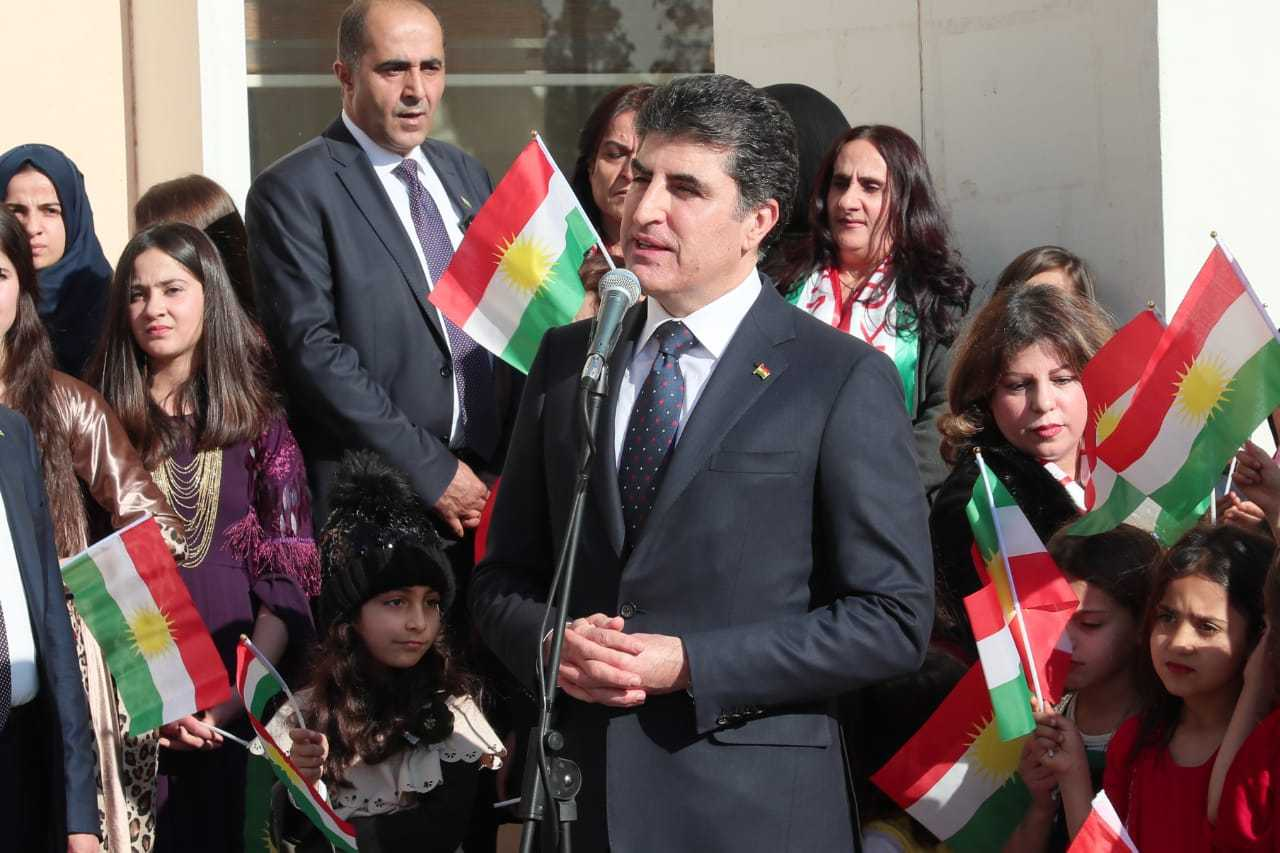
President Nechirvan Barzani participates in a flag raising ceremony at an elementary school on Kurdistan Flag Day. (Erbil,17 December 2019)

In 2014, the war against the Islamic State impacted the Kurdistan Region. In addition to defense, the Kurdistan Region also hosted nearly two million displaced people who sought refuge in Kurdistan. Also, with the fall in international oil prices and Iraq's failure to deliver the Region's budget portion, the Region also entered a massive economic crisis. Barzani successfully used diplomatic means to rebuild relations with Baghdad and resume budgetary allotments.

Nechirvan Barzani is also the Founder of the University Of Kurdistan Hewlêr (UKH), a university in the region. He served as Chancellor of the institute from 2010 to 2019, with Dr. Mohammed Mochtar as his Vice Chancellor.

=== President of the Kurdistan Region (2019–present) ===
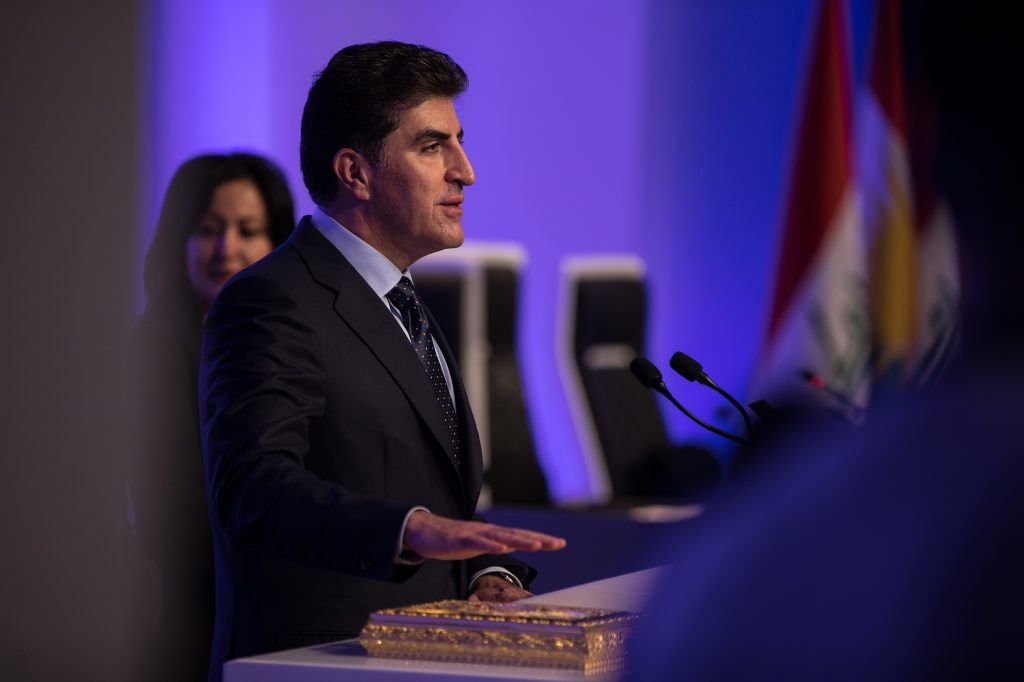
Nechirvan Barzani takes oath of office to become President of the Kurdistan Region at the Presidential Inauguration Ceremony on 10 June 2019.

On 28 May 2019, out of 81 MPs who participated at the session, Nechirvan Barzani was elected as the President of Kurdistan Region by the votes of 68 MPs. Nechirvan Barzani was inaugurated as President of the Kurdistan Region in June 2019. In his inauguration speech, he stated his duty as President of the Kurdistan Region is to continue strengthening Kurdistan's democratic values and developing the government's political, social and economic policies to improve those sectors as well as education, healthcare, and industry.

He has been recognized for his promotion of the rights of all ethnic and religious groups, continued inter-faith dialogue, and women's rights. For this reason, Nechirvan Barzani received support from ethnic and religious groups in the Kurdistan Region.

President Barzani affirmed during his inauguration speech that he will continue plans to build solidarity with neighboring countries, strengthen relations with the international community, and to work closely with the federal government in Baghdad to jointly agree on solutions within the framework of the Constitution of Iraq.

As President, Nechirvan Barzani has publicly reiterated his commitment to ongoing efforts aimed at rescuing Yezidis still missing following the ISIS attacks. Barzani established a special office in 2014 devoted to rescuing Yezidi survivors in ISIS terrorist captivity. More than 3,340 Yezidi victims have been liberated with the support of the office.

== Awards and honors ==
In 2008, Barzani was awarded an honorary Doctor of Public Service degree from Washington & Jefferson College.

== See also ==
- Idris Barzani
- Barzani Family

Political offices
Preceded by Rowsch Shaways	Prime Minister of Kurdistan Region; 1999–2005	Position abolished
New office	Prime Minister of Kurdistan Region; 2006–2009	Succeeded by Barham Salih
Preceded by Barham Salih	Prime Minister of Kurdistan Region; 2012–2019	Succeeded by Masrour Barzani
Preceded by Masoud Barzani	President of Kurdistan Region; 2019–present	Incumbent
