= Kurdistan Conservative Party =

Political party in Kurdistan Region, iraq

Kurdistan Conservative Party پارتی پارێزگارانی کوردستان Partî Parêzgaranî Kurdistan
- Leader: Najat Surchi
- Founded: 1996; 30 years ago
- Ideology: Conservatism

The Kurdistan Conservative Party (Kurdish: پارتی پارێزگارانی کوردستان, romanized: Partî Parêzgaranî Kurdistan) is led by Najat Surchi. The List represents tribal leaders and is dominated by the Surchi family. On 16 June 1996 KDP forces clashed with fighters from the Surchi family's home villages, killing Hussein Surchi, Zaid's uncle. The PUK supported the Conservative Party during the short-lived conflict. The Surchi tribe is found in Erbil, Duhok and Mosul. For the 2009 Iraqi Kurdistan legislative election, the Kurdistan Conservative Party List was given the electoral lot number 61.

For the 2024 Kurdistan Region parliamentary election, the party joined an electoral alliance together with the Democratic National Union of Kurdistan and the Kurdistan Laborers' Party. The alliance is called Serdem Coalition.
