= Movement of the Democratic People of Kurdistan =

Movement of the Democratic People of Kurdistan بزووتنەوەی دیموکراتی گەلی کوردستان
- Leader: Mam Xidir
- Founded: 1995
- Ideology: Communism; Marxism; Kurdish nationalism
- Council of Representatives of Iraq: 0 / 329
- Kurdistan Region Parliament: 0 / 111

Website
- ashte.org/index/

The Movement of the Democratic People of Kurdistan (Kurdish: بزووتنەوەی دیموکراتی گەلی کوردستان, romanized: Bizûtineweyî Dîmukratî Gelî Kurdistan, abbreviated as MDPK) is a Kurdish communist political party formed in 1995. The party is led by Mam Xidir.

The party is part of the so-called Joint Working Committee of the Left of Kurdistan, alongside the Communist Party of Kurdistan – Iraq and the Kurdistan Toilers' Party. Said committee released a statement in August 2022, calling on the elimination of "absolute centralism" in Iraq, as well as the adoption of a separate constitution for the Kurdistan Region and the elections for the Kurdistan Region Parliament and the regional councils to be held on time. Furthermore, the statement calls on the government to stop further privatizations, to provide the salaries of public servants on time and to adopt reforms that improve the economic and social development of the people of Kurdistan.

The declared aims of the party are freedom, social justice, a multi-party democracy, peace and prosperity for Kurds and all peoples of Iraq. Furthermore, the MDPK supports the independence of Kurdistan and criticizes, that the division between Kurdish forces would have caused societal crises that are most felt by the working people. The Ba'athist Iraq of Saddam Hussein is referred to as "fascist" by the party.

Together with the Kurdistan Toilers' Party, the MDPK announced a boycott of the 2023 Kirkuk governorate elections. As reason for the boycott, they stated the lack of a unified Kurdish list, which would cause the Kurdish votes to be scattered.
