= Democratic National Union of Kurdistan =

Political party based in South Kurdistan

Democratic National Union of Kurdistan یەکێتی نەتەوەیی دیموکراتی کوردستان
- Leader: Ghafur Makhmuri
- Founder: Ghafur Makhmuri
- Founded: 1996; 30 years ago
- Ideology: Kurdish nationalism
- Seats in the Kurdistan Region Parliament: 0 / 100

Democratic National Union of Kurdistan (Kurdish: یەکێتی نەتەوەیی دیموکراتی کوردستان, romanized: Yekîtî Neteweyî Dîmukratî Kurdistan, abbreviated as YNDK) is a political party that is based in South Kurdistan.It was founded in 1996 by Ghafur Makhmuri. Its main goal is to establish independence for the greater Kurdistan. The party was part of the Kurdistani List in the 2005 elections and received 1 seat in the Kurdistani parliament.

On 11 November 2023, the party held its 6th congress, where over 200 members were reportedly present. At the congress, Makhmuri said to a journalist that Kurdistan would be in a difficult situation and that the different Kurdish parties would have to cooperate and help each other.

For the 2024 Kurdistan Region parliamentary election, the party joined an electoral alliance together with the Kurdistan Conservative Party and the Kurdistan Laborers' Party. The alliance is called Serdem Coalition.
