= Kurdistan Toilers' Party =

Kurdistan Toilers' Party حزبی زەحمەتکێشانی کوردستان
- Leader: Belên Ebdulla
- Founded: 1985
- Split from: Kurdistan United Socialist Party
- Ideology: Social democracy Kurdish nationalism Historical: Socialism
- Political position: Center-left to left-wing
- Council of Representatives of Iraq: 0 / 328
- Kurdistan Region Parliament: 0 / 111

The Kurdistan Toilers' Party (Kurdish: حزبی زەحمەتکێشانی کوردستان, romanized: Hizbî Zehmetkêşanî Kurdistan, also known as Zahmatkeshan) was founded in 1985 by Qadir Ezîz and Ebdulxaliq Zengene and balen abdulla as a splinter of the short-lived alliance Kurdistan United Socialist Party (HSYK), which had included the Kurdistan Socialist Democratic Party, the Socialist Movement of Kurdistan and the two splinters of the South Kurdistan Movement. They had belonged to the left wing of the party and had criticized the leadership for abandoning socialism in favor of tribal democracy.

== History ==
1985-1986, the party was known as Kurdistan Socialist Party - Revolutionary Democratic Direction (Kurdish: حزبی سۆسیالیستی کوردستان- ئیتجاهی دیموکراتی شۆڕشگێڕ), before being renamed to Kurdistan Toilers' Party. In the year 1990, it became a member of the Iraqi Kurdistan Front. The same year, Mala Bakhtiyar's party Alayî Şoriş (Banner of Revolution), which had split from the Patriotic Union of Kurdistan four years prior, merged into the Toilers' Party. Following the 1992 Kurdistan Region parliamentary election however, Mala Bakhtiyar and most of the former Alayî Şoriş leadership left the party and rejoined the PUK. Over the last decades, the party has abandoned socialist rhetoric and became more moderate.

The former leader Qadir Ezîz left the party in October 2009 after losing an internal power struggle with the wing led by Belên Ebdulla and Se'id Xalîdewe. He proceeded to found the Kurdistan Future Party, also known as Hizbî Ayînde, before joining the Patriotic Union of Kurdistan in 15 July 2016. The general secretary of the Kurdistan Toilers' Party now is Belên Ebdulla.

The party published the newspaper Alayî Azadî or "Banner of Freedom" from 1986 onwards, which has been discontinued later. It also published the theoretical periodical Pêşkewtîn, meaning "Progress" in English, in 1986, which was cancelled after five issues. . In 2003, it also had a TV station called "Voice of Kurdistan Toilers". It was included in the Patriotic Union of Kurdistan-dominated government. It had poor relations with the Kurdistan Democratic Party, but the party's headquarters were transferred to KDP-controlled Erbil under the leadership of Ebdulla.

== Cooperation with other parties ==
The party is part of the so-called Joint Working Committee of the Left of Kurdistan, alongside the Communist Party of Kurdistan – Iraq and the Movement of the Democratic People of Kurdistan. Said committee released a statement in August 2022, calling on the elimination of "absolute centralism" in Iraq, as well as the adoption of a separate constitution for the Kurdistan Region and the elections for the Kurdistan Region Parliament and the regional councils to be held on time. Furthermore, the statement calls on the government to stop further privatizations, to provide the salaries of public servants on time and to adopt reforms that improve the economic and social development of the people of Kurdistan.

== Elections ==
In 2013, it gained one seat in the Kurdistan Region Parliament and one minister in the Kurdistan Regional Government. In 2018, it failed to win a seat again.

Kurdistan Toilers' Party was part of the Kurdistan Alliance Bloc ("Hawpeymanî Kurdistan", no. 372) that existed in the Iraqi Parliament 2005-2010. The first listed candidate for Silêmanî Governorate for the party was Jalal Dabagh, a prominent Kurdish politician.

For the 2024 Kurdistan Region parliamentary election, the party joined an electoral alliance together with the Kurdistan Communist Party – Iraq and the Kurdistan Social Democratic Party. The alliance is called the Kurdistan Region Coalition.

== See also ==
- Jalal Dabagh
