= Hotel Al-Rasheed Agreement =

2024 political agreement in Iraq

The Hotel Al-Rasheed Agreement or The Hotel Al-Rasheed Deal was a political agreement in Kirkuk by political parties for governorship role of Kirkuk following the 2023 Iraqi governorate elections in Kirkuk.

== History ==
On 10 August 2024 in Baghdad, the capital of Iraq, a meeting session was held in the Royal Tulip Al Rasheed Hotel. Out of the 16 members of the Kirkuk Provincial Council, 9 members were present in the meeting. During the meeting the next governor of Kirkuk and the next chairman of the Kirkuk Provincial Council were elected.

== Agreement ==
In the meeting Patriotic Union of Kurdistan's Rebwar Taha was elected as the governor of Kirkuk and Mohammed Hafidh was elected as the chairman of the Kirkuk Provincial Council. This session was boycotted by Kurdistan Democratic Party, Arab Alliance in Kirkuk and the Iraqi Turkmen Front. On 13 August 2024, Rebwar Taha officially assumed office as the Governor of Kirkuk.

=== Rotation of governorship ===
On 16 August 2026, the Kirkuk provincial council held a session in which 14 out of the 16 members were present. The governor of Kirkuk, Rebwar Taha, resigned as governor and Mohammed Samaan Agha was elected as his successor. Due to the power-sharing agreement that the ITF wasn't originally a part of, Mohammed Samaan will continue his duties as governor of Kirkuk until 1 January 2027. After that an Arab will be elected as the new governor of Kirkuk because of the agreement of 10 August 2024.

== Council boycotts ==
Following the agreement the Kurdistan Democratic Party, Iraqi Turkmen Front and the Arab Alliance in Kirkuk boycotted the Kirkuk Provincial Council. It was until 16 August 2026 when the Iraqi Turkmen Front and the Arab Alliance in Kirkuk ended their boycott following the change of governorship of Kirkuk from PUK's Rebwar Taha to ITF leader, Mohammed Samaan. The PDK continued their two-year boycott of the council until 28 July 2026 when they officially attended a session.

== Turkmen governorship rotation ==
In October, 15 2026, the iraqi parliament held a meeting in which they voted to fulfill vacant ministerial positions, vacant deputy premiership and newly introduced ministerial positions, one of which was minister of state. in the meeting, governor of Kirkuk, Mohammed Samaan was nominated and elected as the Minister of State for Minorities' Affairs.

Later in October 18th, 2026, President of Iraq, Nizar Amidi, issued decrees and formally appointed the designated Ministers. Samaan took oath and assumed office as the Minister of State for Minorities' Affairs in October 19, 2026.

Due to Samaan taking office as a minister in the iraqi federal government, kirkuk governorship needed a replacement. In November 14, 2026 a meeting was held in the Kirkuk Provincial Council, in the meeting veteran turkmeni politician, Qahtan Wandawi was elected as the governor of kirkuk to replace Mohammed Samaan Agha. Wandawi received 14 out 15 votes in the election and is expected to serve as the governor until January 2027 to complete the turkmen component's time for governorship. according to the agreement, in January 2027, a politician from the arab component will take office as governor of Kirkuk.
