= List of members of the Kurdistan Region Parliament (2009–2013) =

Kurdistan Parliament پەرلەمانی كوردستان Perlemanî Kurdistan

Structure
- Seats: 111 Seats in the Assembly
- Political groups: Parties Represented in Parliament: Kurdistan List (59); Gorran (25); Reform and Service List (13); IMK List (2); Social Justice and Freedom (1); Reserved for minorities (11)

The members of the Iraqi Kurdistan Parliament for Third Term were elected on 25 July 2009.

== Members of the Iraqi Kurdistan Parliament ==
=== Kurdistan List reserved seats ===
Party	Member	Notes
Kurdistan Democratic Party (30)	Imad Muhammad Husein	
Kurdistan Democratic Party (30)	Omar Sadiq Muhammad Ibrahim	
Kurdistan Democratic Party (30)	Amina Zkri Sa'id Yousf	
Kurdistan Democratic Party (30)	Awaz Abdulwahid Khidhr Ali	
Kurdistan Democratic Party (30)	Dilshad Shahab Haji	Resigned
Kurdistan Democratic Party (30)	Fadhil Muhammad Qadir	
Kurdistan Democratic Party (30)	Kaili Akram Mantk	
Kurdistan Democratic Party (30)	Dr Layla Amir'as Aziz	
Kurdistan Democratic Party (30)	Qadir Hasan Qadir	
Kurdistan Democratic Party (30)	Sabiha Ahmed Mustafa Shwan	
Kurdistan Democratic Party (30)	Sherwan Nasih Abdullah Sabghatullah Al-Haidari	Resigned
Kurdistan Democratic Party (30)	Awaz Abdulwahid Khidhr Ali	
Kurdistan Democratic Party (30)	Abdulsalam Mustafa Sdiq Ali	
Kurdistan Democratic Party (30)	Aveen Omar Ahmed	
Kurdistan Democratic Party (30)	Bakir Kareem Muhammad Salih	
Kurdistan Democratic Party (30)	Dr Muhammad Musa Mustafa	
Kurdistan Democratic Party (30)	Hazim Tahsin Sa'id Ali	
Kurdistan Democratic Party (30)	Khurshid Ahmed Salim Younis	
Kurdistan Democratic Party (30)	Nazhad Aziz Qadir	
Kurdistan Democratic Party (30)	Rozhan Abdullah Qadir Ahmed Bayz	
Kurdistan Democratic Party (30)	Samira Abdullah Ismail	
Kurdistan Democratic Party (30)	Shler Mhedin Salih Muhammad	
Kurdistan Democratic Party (30)	Zakiya Salih Abdulqadir Rashid	
Kurdistan Democratic Party (30)	Hassan Mohammed Sura	
Kurdistan Democratic Party (30)	Ali Husein Muhammad Hasan	
Kurdistan Democratic Party (30)	Bashir Khalil Tofiq	
Kurdistan Democratic Party (30)	Jamal Tahir Ibrahim Muhammad	
Kurdistan Democratic Party (30)	Lana Ahmed Mahmud Abdulqadir	
Kurdistan Democratic Party (30)	Sabah Baitullah Shukri Mahmood	
Kurdistan Democratic Party (30)	Omer Hamad Ameen Nuradini	
Kurdistan Democratic Party (30)	Sardar Rashid Muhammad Ahmed	
Kurdistan Democratic Party (30)	Shvan Ahmed Abdulqadir	
Kurdistan Democratic Party (30)	Zhian Omar Sharif	
Patriotic Union of Kurdistan (29)	Muhammad Ahmmad Ali	
Patriotic Union of Kurdistan (29)	Nishtiman Mursheed Salih	
Patriotic Union of Kurdistan (29)	Abdullah Ali Ibrahim Husein	Resigned
Patriotic Union of Kurdistan (29)	Gasha Dara Jalal Ahmed	
Patriotic Union of Kurdistan (29)	Jalal Ali Abdullah Othman	
Patriotic Union of Kurdistan (29)	Muhammad Ahmed Ali	
Patriotic Union of Kurdistan (29)	Parween Abdulrahman Abdullah	
Patriotic Union of Kurdistan (29)	Razaw Mahmud Faraj	
Patriotic Union of Kurdistan (29)	Shilan Abduljabar Abdulghani Ibrahim	
Patriotic Union of Kurdistan (29)	Suzan Shahab Nuri	
Patriotic Union of Kurdistan (29)	Goran Azad Muhammad Abdulla	
Patriotic Union of Kurdistan (29)	Salar Mahmud Murad Ali	
Patriotic Union of Kurdistan (29)	Aras Hussain Mahmood	
Patriotic Union of Kurdistan (29)	Berivan Ismail Sarhang	
Patriotic Union of Kurdistan (29)	Kawa Muhamad amin Husein	
Patriotic Union of Kurdistan (29)	Muhammad Dler Mahmud Fatah	
Patriotic Union of Kurdistan (29)	Qadir Ahmed Ismail	
Patriotic Union of Kurdistan (29)	Rzgar Muhammad Amin Hamasa'id	Resigned
Patriotic Union of Kurdistan (29)	Shorsh Majid Husein Mursil	
Patriotic Union of Kurdistan (29)	Tara Abdulrazaq Muhammad Omar	
Patriotic Union of Kurdistan (29)	Shler Muhammad Najib	
Patriotic Union of Kurdistan (29)	Shilan Abduljabar Abdulghani	
Patriotic Union of Kurdistan (29)	Awni Kamal Sa'id Aziz Bazzaz	
Patriotic Union of Kurdistan (29)	Dana Sa’id Sofi	
Patriotic Union of Kurdistan (29)	Ismael Mahmood Abdullah	
Patriotic Union of Kurdistan (29)	Khalil Othman Hamadamin Rasul	
Patriotic Union of Kurdistan (29)	Omar Abdulrahman Ali Abdullah	
Patriotic Union of Kurdistan (29)	Rafiq Sabir Qadir Taha	Resigned
Patriotic Union of Kurdistan (29)	Sarwar Abdulrahman Omer	
Patriotic Union of Kurdistan (29)	Shawnm Muhammad Gharib Taha	
Patriotic Union of Kurdistan (29)	Shwan Abdulkarim Jalal Mahmud	
Patriotic Union of Kurdistan (29)	Tara Tahsin Yasin As'adi	

=== Movement for Change reserved seats ===
Party	Member
Movement for Change (25)	Siwail Othman Ahmed
Movement for Change (25)	Nasreen Jamal Mustafa Najeeb
Movement for Change (25)	Parihan Qublai Muhammad Ali
Movement for Change (25)	Sarhang Faraj Muhammad Mahmud
Movement for Change (25)	Nasreen Jamal Mustafa Najeeb
Movement for Change (25)	Adnan Othman Muhammad
Movement for Change (25)	Nariman Abdullah Qadir Ahmed
Movement for Change (25)	Shaho Sa’id Fat-hulah
Movement for Change (25)	Zana Rauf Hama Karim
Movement for Change (25)	Ashti Aziz Salih Isma’il
Movement for Change (25)	Azima Najmadeen Hasan
Movement for Change (25)	Payam Ahmed Muhammad Ameen
Movement for Change (25)	Abdullah Muhammad Nuri
Movement for Change (25)	Ja’far Ali Rasul Muhammad
Movement for Change (25)	Payman Abdulkareem Abdulqadir Rasul
Movement for Change (25)	Sherzad Abdulhafiz Shareef Faqe Muhammad
Movement for Change (25)	Burhan Rasheed Husen
Movement for Change (25)	Isma’il Sa’idd Ali Galali
Movement for Change (25)	Rebaz Fattah Mahmoud
Movement for Change (25)	Kardo Muhammad Pirdawd
Movement for Change (25)	Payman Izadeen Abdulrahman
Movement for Change (25)	Peshawa Tofiq Maghdid Husaen
Movement for Change (25)	Vian Abduraheem Abdullah Abduraheem

=== Reform and Service List reserved seats ===
Party	Member
Kurdistan Islamic Union (6)	Bayan Ahmed Hassan Barwari
Kurdistan Islamic Union (6)	Omar Abdul Aziz Bahadin
Kurdistan Islamic Union (6)	Hama Said Hama Ali
Kurdistan Islamic Union (6)	Nasik Tawfiq Abdul-Kareem Abdul-Rahem
Kurdistan Islamic Union (6)	Samir Salim Amen Beg Hama Beg
Kurdistan Islamic Union (6)	Hawraz Shek Ahmed Hamad
Kurdistan Islamic Group (4)	Ayub Ni’mat Qadir
Kurdistan Islamic Group (4)	Sargwl Raza Hasan
Kurdistan Islamic Group (4)	Ahmed Suleiman Abdullah
Kurdistan Islamic Group (4)	Sabah Muhammad Najeeb
Kurdistan Socialist Democratic Party (2)	Abdullah Mahmood Muhammad
Kurdistan Socialist Democratic Party (2)	Bafreen Husain Hamad
Future Party (1)	Fazil Hasan Esma’il

=== IMK List reserved seats ===
Party	Member
Kurdistan Islamic Movement (2)	Ahmed Ibrahim Ali
Kurdistan Islamic Movement (2)	Gulizar Qadir Isma’il

=== Social Justice and Freedom List reserved seats ===
Party	Member
Communist Party of Kurdistan – Iraq (1)	Hazha Suleiman Mustafa Mazhar

=== TDM List reserved seats ===
Party	Member
Turkmen Democratic Movement (3)	Yawz Khurshid Othman
Turkmen Democratic Movement (3)	Hamdiya Ma’ruf Ahmed Taha
Turkmen Democratic Movement (3)	Yashar Najmaddin Nuraddin Abdullah

=== CSAPC reserved seats ===
Party	Member
Chaldean Syriac Assyrian Popular Council (3)	Susan Yousif Khoshaba
Chaldean Syriac Assyrian Popular Council (3)	Amir Goga Yousif
Chaldean Syriac Assyrian Popular Council (3)	Thair Abdul-ahad Oghstin

=== National Rafidain List reserved seats ===
Party	Member
Assyrian Democratic Movement (2)	Susan Yousif Khoshaba
Assyrian Democratic Movement (2)	Salm Toma Kako

=== Independent Armenian reserved seats ===
Party	Member
	Aram Shahin Dawd Bakuian

=== The Turkman Reform List reserved seats ===
Party	Member
Iraqi Turkmen Front (1)	Abdulqadir Akram Jamil Abdulsamad

=== Erbil Turkmans List-Hawler reserved seats ===
Party	Member
Erbil Turkmen (1)	Sherdl Tahsin Muhammad
