= Mohammed Hafidh =

Iraqi Politician

- محمد الحافظ

Chairman of The Kirkuk Provincial Council
- Incumbent
- Assumed office 18 January 2024
- Appointed by: Kirkuk Provincial Council
- Governor: Mohammed Sama'an; Rebwar Taha
- Deputy: Nashat Shahwez
- Preceded by: vacant

Personal details
- Born: 1980, Kirkuk
- Party: Independent
- Other political affiliations: Command Alliance (Al Qiyada); Sovereignty Alliance
- Occupation: Politician
- Profession: Engineer
- Website: mohammedalhafidh.com

Mohammed Ibrahim Hafidh (Arabic: محمد إبراهيم الحافظ / Sorani Kurdish: محەممەد ئیبراهیم حافیز) (born 1980) is an iraqi politician, serving as the Chairman of The Kirkuk Provincial Council since August 18, 2024. He was elected as chairman following the Hotel Al-Rasheed Agreement

== Early life ==
Hafidh was born in 1980 in Kirkuk. Hafidh has a Bachelor's Degree in Civil Engineering.

== Career ==
=== 2023 Provincial Election ===
Hafidh ran in the 2023 Iraqi governorate elections in Kirkuk Governorate. He was the head of list for the Qiyada Party in Kirkuk and got 8,666 votes.

=== Council chairman ===
After the 2023 Iraqi governorate election, Hafidh secured a seat in the Kirkuk Provincial Council. He was elected as the chairman of the Kirkuk Provincial Council.

== Sovereignty Alliance ==
Hafidh's party (Sovereignty Alliance) was a member of the Qiyada Alliance. The party announced that Hafidh had been expelled by the party on August 11, 2024, one day after he was nominated as chairman of the Kirkuk Pronvicial Council. This was due to his failure to adhere to the party's directives and attending the Hotel Al-Rasheed Agreement.
