= Qahtan Wandawi =

Iraqi Turkmen politician

- Kahtan Vendavi
- Qahtan Al-Wandawi at his office at the Iraqi Turkmen Front headquarters in Kirkuk

Governor of Kirkuk
- Incumbent
- Assumed office November 22 2026
- Appointed by: Kirkuk Provincial Council
- Deputy: Rebwar Taha
- Preceded by: Mohammed Samaan Agha

Personal details
- Born: Qahtan Wahbi Hassan Ali Al-Wandawi; 1975 (age 50–51) Kirkuk, Ba'athist Iraq
- Party: Iraqi Turkmen Front
- Education: A master's degree in International Trade and Logistics
- Occupation: Politician

Qahtan Al-Wandawi (Note: Arabic: قحطان الونداوي; Turkish: Kehtan Vendavi; Sorani Kurdish: قەحتان وەنداوی) (Born 1975) is an Iraqi Turkmen politician who has served as the Governor of Kirkuk since November 22, 2026.

== Early life and Education ==
Wandawi was born in 1975 in Tas'een neighborhood, Kirkuk. Wandawi holds a master's degree in International Trade and Logisticsl

From 2003 until 2010 Wandawi was active in the Iraqi Turkmen Front Student and Youth Union and its activities. He also served as Vice President for Student Affairs and was a member of the Union’s Executive Bureau.

== Career ==
Wandawi's political career began in 2010 when he joined the Central Committee of the Iraqi Turkmen Front. Later in 2019 he was elected as the deputy head of ITF's Kirkuk branch where he assumed responsibility for organizational affairs. And in 2022 he was elected as the head of ITF's Kirkuk branch.

=== 2025 parliamentary election ===
Wandawi ran as a candidate for the Iraqi Turkmen Front list in the 2025 Iraqi parliamentary election and received 11,257 votes and was the second most voted candidate on the list.

=== Kirkuk governorship ===
In November 14, 2026 a meeting was held in the Kirkuk Provincial Council in which they held an election to elect a replacement for former governor, Mohammed Sama'an who stepped down as governor after being elected as the Minister of State for minorities' affairs in the federal iraqi government. in the election Wandawi was elected as governor after receiving 14 out of 15 votes.

Wandawi received the presidential decree by president of iraq, Nizar Amedi on November 20, 2026 and was appointed as Governor of Kirkuk. 2 days later, in November 22, 2026 he took constitutional oath and was sworn in and assumed office as Governor of Kirkuk.
