= 2026 Iraqi presidential election =

- 11 April 2026
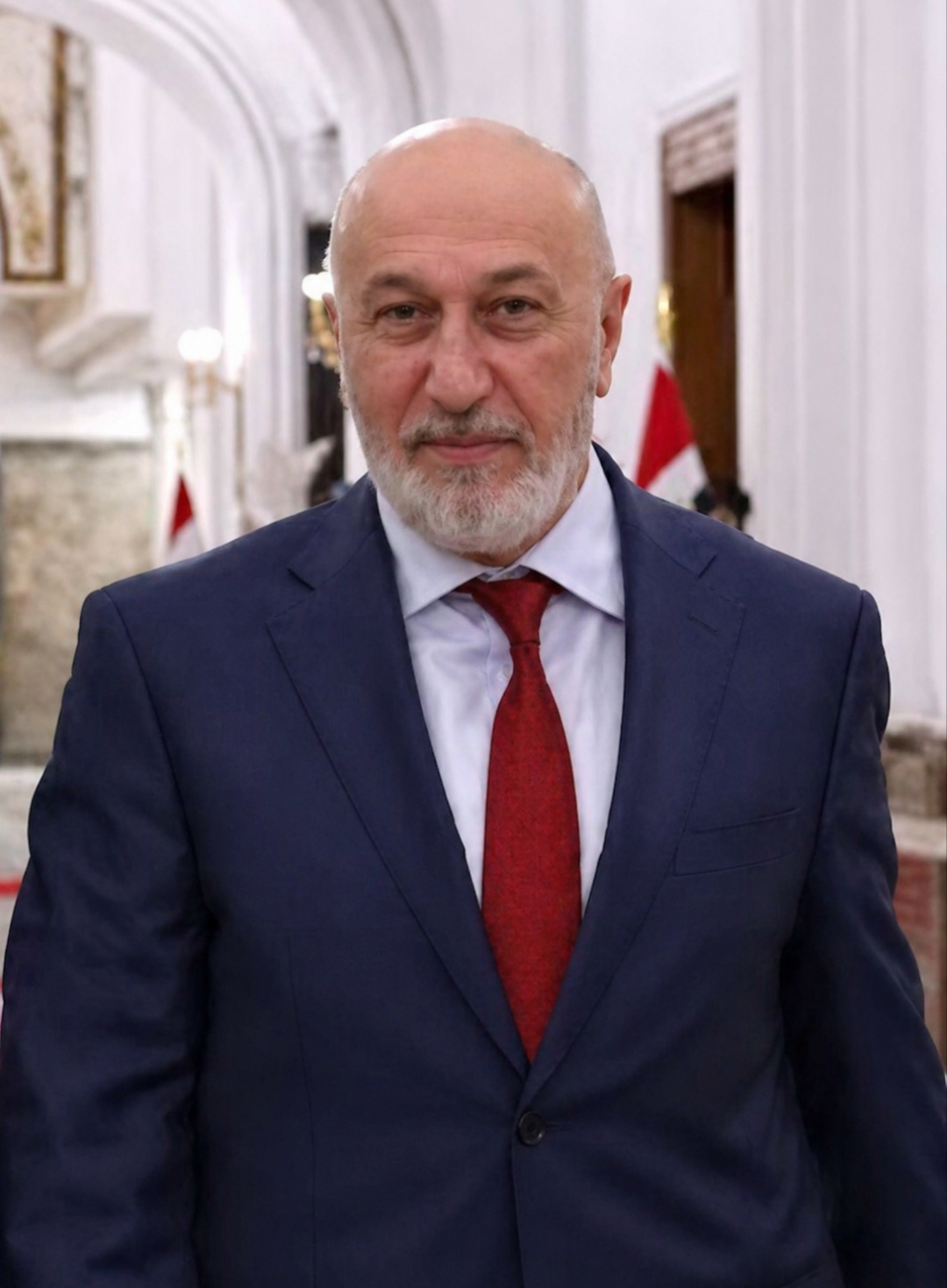

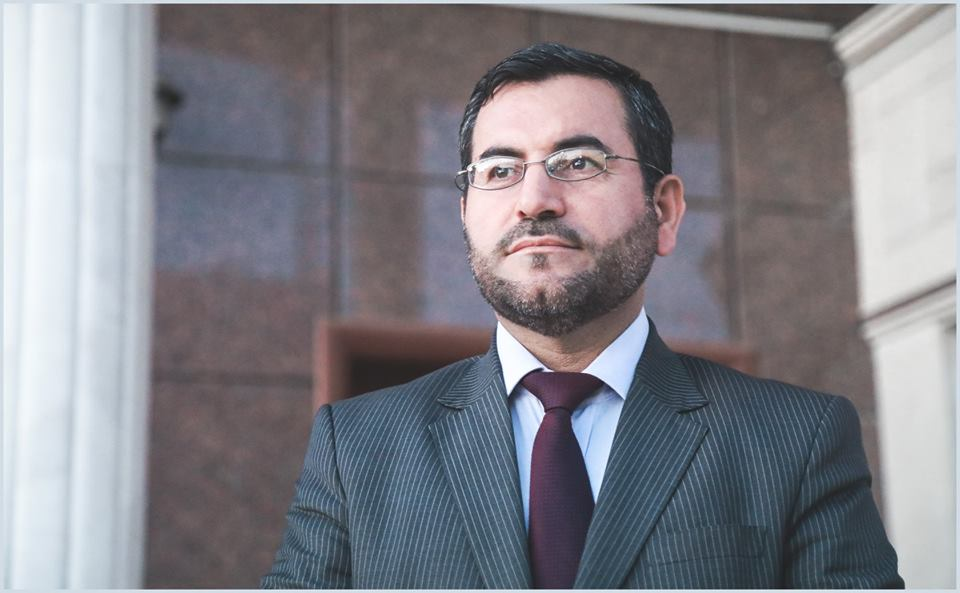
Nominee	Nizar Amidi	Muthanna Amin
Party	PUK	KIU
Indirect vote	227	15
Percentage	90.08%	5.95%
President before election
Abdul Latif Rashid
PUK
Elected president
Nizar Amidi
PUK

An indirect election was held for the president of Iraq on 11 April 2026 by the Council of Representatives. Nizar Amidi of the Patriotic Union of Kurdistan was elected in the second round of voting with 227 votes, defeating Muthanna Amin of the Kurdistan Islamic Union with 15 votes. Incumbent president Abdul Latif Rashid was eligible for another term but chose not to run. Amidi led in the first round with 208 votes, but was short of the two-thirds majority required by the constitution.

Although the constitution of Iraq requires a presidential election to be held within thirty days of a new parliament being elected, it was delayed by five months after the November 2025 parliamentary election. This was due to disagreement within the largest electoral bloc, the Coordination Framework, on the selection of a prime minister-designate, who would be appointed by the president; and disagreement between the Kurdish Democratic Party (KDP) and the Patriotic Union of Kurdistan (PUK) over the presidential candidate. Sessions of parliament in December 2025 and February 2026 failed to hold a presidential vote, delaying it until April 2026.

The PUK traditionally chose the presidential candidate by informal agreement, but Nizar Amidi was challenged by Fuad Hussein of the KDP, who was eliminated in the first round. The KDP said after the election that it does not recognize the outcome.

== Background ==
According to the constitution of Iraq, after the speaker is chosen, the parliament of Iraq is required to elect the president of Iraq with a two-thirds majority (somewhere around 220 votes) within 30 days after the first parliamentary session. If the parliament is unable to properly choose a president in the first round, then the two candidates that won the most votes will compete in a second round. If one of the candidates wins more votes then the other, then they become president.

After the president is chosen, they are mandated to appoint the leader of the political bloc with the most seats as prime minister. The prime minister then forms a new cabinet and has the nominees be approved by parliament through a vote of confidence within either 15 or 30 days. This election was organized after parliamentary sessions regarding the leadership were completed between 29–30 December 2025.

The role of the president is informally reserved for a person of Kurdish ethnicity as part of a confessional quota, along with a Sunni Muslim being the speaker of Parliament, and a Shia Muslim as prime minister. This unofficial quota, known as the Muhasasa system, was established after the United States invasion of Iraq.

An agreement between the PUK and KDP was made in which a nominee of the former party will hold the role of president while the latter will govern the semi-autonomous Kurdistan Region. The agreement has been criticised for encouraging corruption and sectarian splits. The KDP has also reportedly planned to run for president against the PUK's candidate.

== Candidates ==
Prominent candidates included former minister of foreign affairs, (Note: Only for the caretaker government that the source referred to.) Fuad Hussein, and former governor of Erbil, Nawzad Hadi of the Kurdistan Democratic Party (KDP) and former minister of environment, Nizar Amedi and incumbent president, Abdul Latif Rashid (Note: planning to run as an independent in the presidential election despite an insuffiency in PUK support.) of the Patriotic Union of Kurdistan (PUK). Secretary-general of the Iraqi parliament, Al-Gargari stated that finalists will be later revealed after process. Rashid later withdrew before the first round of voting.

Arabic sources have mentioned of 15 candidates being approved by parliament with Fuad Hussein and Nizar Amedi being qualified. Other candidates includes Shwan Hawiz Fariq Nam, Ahmed Abdullah Tawfiq Ahmed, Hussein Taha Hassan Mohammed Sinjari, Najm al-Din Abdul Karim Hama Karim Nasrallah, Asu Faridun Ali, Saman Ali Ismail Shali, Sabah Saleh Saeed, Abdullah Mohammed Ali Zahir, Iqbal Abdullah Amin Halawi, Nizar Mohammed Saeed Mohammed Kanji, Sardar Abdullah Mahmoud Timz, Muthanna Amin Nader, and Nawzad Hadi Mawloud.

44 to 81 people originally registered themselves to be potential candidates before parliament closed down the nomination on 6 January. Regular Iraqi civilians have also applied to be presidential candidates as opposition against the ethno-sectarian system, with critics accusing the system of increasing inefficiency, corruption, and deepening sectarianism.

== Preparations ==
The Coordination Framework, a coalition of Shia Muslim parties, declared itself to be the largest parliamentary bloc after the 2025 Iraqi parliamentary election held on 11 November 2025. Incumbent prime minister Mohammed Shia' al-Sudani of the Coordination Framework endorsed former leader Nouri al-Maliki to become the new prime minister. Al-Maliki previously served as prime minister between 2006 and 2014, stepping down during the Islamic State invasion of Iraq. U.S. President Donald Trump called the decision to nominate al-Maliki "a very bad choice" due to previous allegations of him deepening sectarianism in Iraq, and his perceived closeness to Iran and its allies in Iraq. The U.S. is influential in Iraq, especially because the oil revenue of the Iraqi government is held at the Federal Reserve Bank of New York.

The election of a president by the Council of Representatives was the next step in the government formation process. Despite the constitutional requirement of holding a vote within thirty days, the date has been delayed mainly at the request of the KDP and PUK that needed more time to establish their candidates and that said candidates were not approved by Shia and Sunni parliamentary groups yet. Previously, speaker Haibat al-Halbousi and KDP politician Shakhawan Abdullah had announced that the election set to be held on 27 January 28 January, a month after the 29 December parliamentary session following the 2025 parliamentary elections. The Iraqi parliament has previously been unable to be faithful towards dates. Because of the disagreement between the Kurdish parties, the Coordination Framework told its members on 4 February that they are free to vote for any candidate instead of a pre-selected candidate.

Furthermore, there was disagreement within Coordination Framework over the selection of al-Maliki, and the KDP and al-Maliki's State of Law Coalition opposed proceeding with a presidential vote without an agreement on a prime minister-designate. After the February session of parliament, the next session was scheduled to convene on 11 April. The day before the vote, several factions announced a boycott (including the KDP, the State of Law Coalition, and the Azem Alliance), while others called for it to go ahead, including the PUK, the State Forces Alliance, the Takadum Party, the Reconstruction and Development Coalition, the Sadiqoun Bloc, and the Turkmen Front. On 11 April two rounds of voting were held, because PUK candidate Nizar Amidi failed to win a two-thirds majority in the first round.

== Results ==
Results
Canditates	Parties	First round		Second round	
Canditates	Parties	Votes	%	Votes	%
Nizar Amidi	PUK	208	82.54	227	90.08
Muthanna Amin	KIU	17	6.75	15	5.95
Fuad Hussein	KDP	16	6.35	Eliminated	
Abdullah Al-Ulawi	Independent	2	0.79	Eliminated	
Required majority (Note: In the first round, a two-thirds majority of those registered is required, not a majority of the votes cast. In the second round, the election only requires obtaining the greatest number of votes between the two remaining candidates, i.e. the absolute majority of the votes cast.)		220 votes		50% of votes	
Valid votes		243	96.43	242	96.03
Blank and invalid votes		9	3.57	10	3.97
Total		252	100	252	100
Abstention		33	23.40	33	23.40
Registered voters / turnout		329	76.60	329	76.60

== Reactions ==
The Kurdistan Democratic Party refused to recognize the outcome of the election or work with the new president, claiming that the vote violated parliamentary regulations.

Amidi was congratulated on his election victory by Russian President Vladimir Putin. On 29 April, Syrian President Ahmed al-Sharaa made a telephone call to Amedi to congratulate him on taking office.
