= Daquq =

Dāqūq Dāqūq Daquq
- Town
- Location in Iraq Dāqūq (Iraqi Kurdistan)
- Coordinates: 35°8′18″N 44°26′55″E
- Country: Iraq
- Governorate: Kirkuk Governorate
- District: Daquq District

Population (2024)
  - Total: 45,661

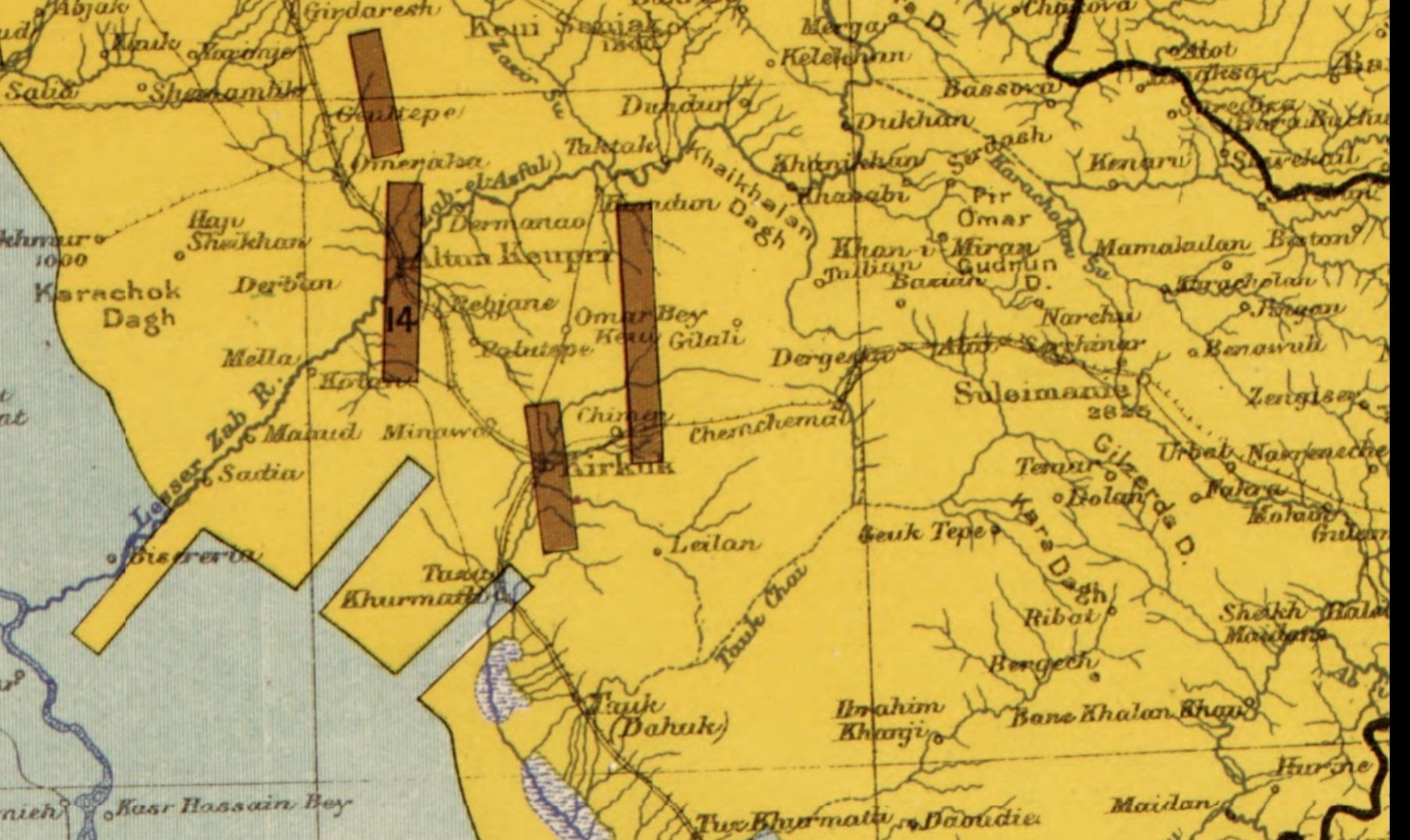
Kirkuk in Maunsell's map, Pre-World War I British Ethnographical Map of eastern Turkey in Asia, Syria and western Persia

Al-Daquq (Arabic: داقوق, romanized: Dāqūq, alternatively Ṭawūq or Ṭa’ūq, Kurdish: داقووق, romanized: Daqûq, Turkish: Dakuk or Tavuk), also known as Tavuk Kasabasi, is a city and the urban center of Daquq District in Kirkuk Governorate, Iraq. The city is ethnically diverse, with a Kurdish majority and Arab and Turkmen minority. It is part of the disputed territories of Northern Iraq. The town is a major agricultural area. In the last Iraqi census conducted in 2024, the town of Daquq had a population of 45,661.

District Governor (Qaimaqam): Adnan Hussein

== Early history ==
Daquq was first mentioned under the name Diquqina in Aramaic texts of the Neo-Assyrian Empire in the 7th century BCE. The Assyriologist Ariel M. Bagg mentions that Ṭāwūq (another name of Daquq) is the location of either Diquqina or another town called Lubdu, the latter of which could also be at the site of Tall Buldağ. The historian Michael Astour also identified Diquqina with modern Daquq in 1987, calling it an attested provincial center in the Neo-Assyrian period. He also argued that Lubdu, in his text written as Lubda, was another provincial center south of Arrapḫa in a certain distance to Diquqina, but with the exact location unknown.

A clay tablet from 622 BCE written in Akkadian language in Neo-Assyrian script mentions Diquqina. In the record, the treasurer Šumma-ilani purchases the enslaved woman Nanaya-da from the priest Remanni-ilu, a transaction witnessed by 5 people from Diquqina. In another mention of Diquqina from the 7th century BCE, Dadī, a servant of the Assyrian king reports to his ruler that the town of Diquqina hasn't delivered the two cows and 20 sheep required as sacrifice to the king. He continues, that they haven't delivered the sacrifice for years (the exact number was not readable) and requests military action against the town. The sources do not mention an etymology of the name Diquqina.

Abul-Fath Mohammad bin Annaz, the founder of the Annazid dynasty, temporarily seized Daquq from Banu Oqayl in 998 AD. In the Middle Ages, the city became known in Arabic as Daqūq and Daqūqā. Idris Bitlisi mentioned the town in his work Sharafnama from 1597 as a town being a source of naphtha.

== Modern history ==
Ottoman Midhat Pasha built the famous and intact Daquq bridge in 1883 making it easier for the Ottomans to travel southward. In 1906, the town had about 1,000 people.

In 1925, Daquq's population was predominantly Turkmen.

60% of the population was Kurdish in the 1947 census out of a population of 14,600.

It experienced Arabization during the Saddam era in which Kurdish lands was seized for Arab settlers. After the fall of the Saddam regime, Kurds forced the Arab settlers out.

In 2011, an estimated 7.3% of Daquq residents lived below the poverty line.

On 21 October 2016, the International Coalition bombed a Muharram shrine, where 28 Turkmen civilians (25 woman and 3 children) were killed.

After the 2017 Battle of Kirkuk, the city has experienced renewed Arabization. In November 2018, reports indicated that 50 Arab households, escorted by the Iraqi Federal Police, had settled into Daquq.

== Religion ==
Many of the Kurds are Kaka'i, while the Turkmen population is Shia. The Kaka'i population experiences harassment and intimidation from the Popular Mobilization Forces (PMF) which has been controlling the town since 2017. On 21 March 2018, the Kaka'i shrine in the town was destroyed which the local Kaka'is blamed the PMF on.
