= Muthanna Amin =

Iraqi Kurdish politician

- موسەننا ئەمین
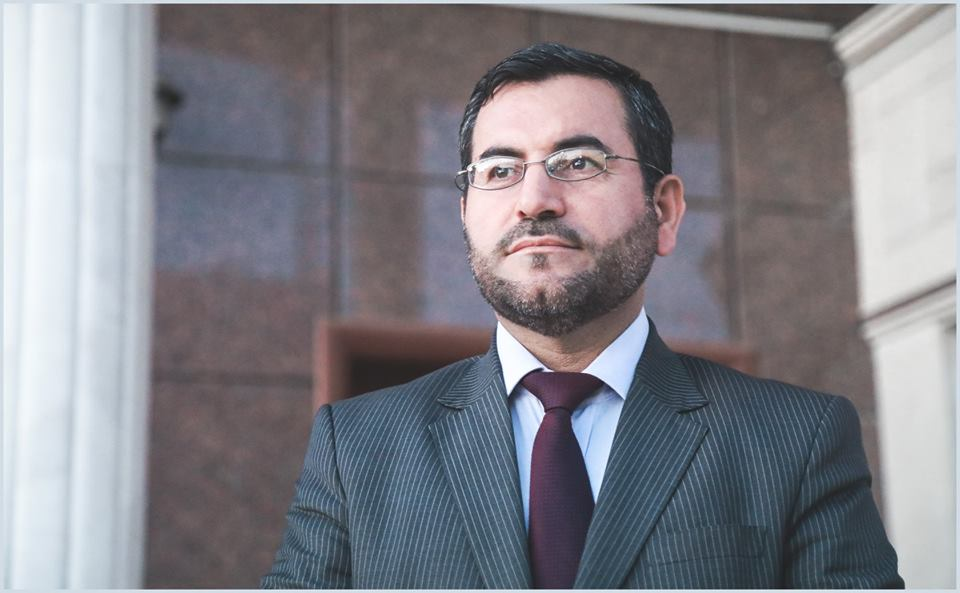

Member of the Council of Representatives
- Incumbent
- Assumed office 2025
- Parliamentary group: Kurdistan Islamic Union
- Constituency: Sulaymaniyah
- In office 2022–2025
- Parliamentary group: Kurdistan Islamic Union
- Constituency: Sulaymaniyah
- In office 2018–2021
- Parliamentary group: Kurdistan Islamic Union
- Constituency: Sulaymaniyah
- In office 2014–2018
- Parliamentary group: Kurdistan Islamic Union
- Constituency: Sulaymaniyah

Personal details
- Born: Muthanna Amin Nader; July 1, 1972 (age 54) Sharazur, Ba'athist Iraq
- Party: Kurdistan Islamic Union
- Education: PhD's in Islamic Philosophy; Master's Degree in Political Science
- Alma mater: Omdurman Islamic University; University of Khartoum
- Profession: Politician, Professor, Writer.

Muthanna Amin Nader (Sorani Kurdish: موسەننا ئەمین نادر / Arabic: مثني امين نادر) (Born July 1, 1972) is an Iraqi Kurdish politician who is a member of The Iraqi Council of Representatives and an active member of The Kurdistan Islamic Union.

== Early life and education ==
Amin was born on July 1, 1972 in Sharazur, Ba'athist Iraq

Amin started his political and Islamic career in 1985. In 1988 while being a refugee in Iran, he studied Sharia Sciences Alongside his uncle (Mamosta Hama-amin Klashi) and multiple other scholars.

=== Education ===
In 1992 Amin returned to Kurdistan and took his 12th grade national exams in Islamic schools. Amin later migrated to Sudan where he got his PhD's in Islamic philosophy and a higher Diploma in Political science, international relations. Amin also holds a master's degree in Political sciences, international relations.

- PhD's in Islamic Philosophy:

Amin got his PhD's in Islamic philosophy in the Omdurman Islamic University, College of Osool Edin (Fundamentals of Religion).

- Diploma in Political Science:

Amin got his higher Diploma in political science, international relations in the University of Khartoum.

== Career ==
Prior to his political career, Amin worked as a professor at the University of Sulaimani for 4 years. Amin is also a Writer and Author and has written multiple books and has multiple publications in multiple languages.

=== 2014 parliamentary election ===
Amin ran as a candidate for the Kurdistan Islamic Union for the 2014 Iraqi parliamentary election. He got 51,587 votes and secured a seat in the Council of Representatives of Iraq. he was also the head of the KIU's parliamentary bloc.

=== 2018 parliamentary election ===
Amin ran as a candidate for the Kurdistan Islamic Union for the 2018 Iraqi parliamentary election. He got 12,623 votes and secured a seat in the Council of Representatives of Iraq.

=== 2021 parliamentary election ===
Amin ran as a candidate for the Kurdistan Islamic Union for the 2021 Iraqi parliamentary election. He got 14,719 votes and secured a seat in the Council of Representatives of Iraq.

=== 2025 parliamentary election ===
In the election Amin ran as a KIU candidate. Amin received 36,689 votes and secured a seat in the parliament.

=== 2026 Presidential election ===
Amin was an elected candidate for the 2026 Iraqi presidential election. There were 16 candidates for the election. The two major Kurdish parties, PUK and PDK had chosen Nizar Amedi (PUK) and Fuad Hussein (PDK) as their candidates and Muthanna Amin was chosen by the main Kurdish oppositions. (Kurdistan Islamic Union with the support of the National Stance Movement).

==== First Round ====
In the first round of the election Nizar Amidi received 208 votes, Muthanna Amin received 17 votes, Fuad Hussein received 16 votes and Independent candidate, Abdullah Al-Ulawi received 2 votes. The election went to a second round and both Hussein and Al-Ulawi were eliminated from the election.

==== Second Round ====
In the second round of the election between Nizar Amedi and Muthanna Amin, Amedi received 227 votes and Amin received 15. In results Amedi won the election and was elected as President of Iraq.

== Books ==
- Gender: Origin, Meaning, and Impact (In Arabic, Published in 2004, (132 Pages), (Co-Author alongside: Kameilia Helmy).
- Women's Liberation Movements From Equality To Gender: An Islamic Critical Study (in Arabic), Published in 2011, (498 Pages).
- Nationalities Issues And Their Impact On International Relations - The Kurdish Issue As A Model (in Arabic), Published in 2014, (203 Pages).
