= Hasan Turan (Iraqi politician) =

- حسن توران

President of the Iraqi Turkmen Front
- In office 28 March 2021 – 13 April 2025
- Preceded by: Arshad al-Salihi
- Succeeded by: Mohammed Samaan Agha

Member of the Council of Representatives of Iraq
- In office 30 April 2014 – 12 May 2018
- Parliamentary group: Iraqi Turkmen Front
- Constituency: Kirkuk

President of Kirkuk Provincial Parliament
- In office 2011–2014

Personal details
- Born: May 25, 1962 (age 64) Kirkuk, Iraq
- Education: University of Mosul
- Profession: Politician, activist

Hasan Turan (Arabic: حسن توران; born 25 May 1962, Kirkuk), Iraqi Turkman politician and activist. He was the chairman of Iraqi Turkmen Front 28 March 2021 to 13 April 2025.

== Biography ==
Hasan Turan was born in Kirkuk in 1962. He graduated from University of Mosul, Faculty of Agriculture.

After the toppling of Saddam Hussein, he joined to Turkmen Justice Party in 2003. He was elected to the Membership of Kirkuk Provincial Parliament in 2005. Turan, who was elected as the President of Kirkuk Provincial Parliament in 2011, became a deputy in Iraqi Parliament in 2014. In 2018 he became the vice-president and a board member of the ITF. After the resignation of Arshad al-Salihi, he became the chairperson of the party on 28 March 2021.
