= Arshad al-Salihi =

Iraqi Turkmen politician

- أرشد الصالحي

President of the Iraqi Turkmen Front
- In office May 2011 – 28 March 2021

Personal details
- Born: 1959 (age 66–67) Musalla, Kirkuk, Iraq
- Party: Iraqi Turkmen Front
- Education: University of Baghdad
- Occupation: Politician

Arshad al-Salihi (Note: Arabic: أرشد الصالحي, romanized: ʾArshad aṣ-Ṣāliḥ; Turkish: Erşat Salihi) (born 1959) is an Iraqi Turkmen politician who was the president of the Iraqi Turkmen Front from May 2011 until March 2021, and a member of the Iraqi parliament since 2010.

== Early life and education ==
Arshad al-Salihi was born in the Musalla district of Kirkuk in 1959. He completed primary and secondary education in Kirkuk, later entering the Faculty of Science at the University of Baghdad in 1978.

== Career ==
After secondary school, al-Salihi began participating in pro-Turkmen political activities, resulting in his arrest by the Ba'athist government in 1979. He spent nine years in Abu Ghraib Prison as a political prisoner. His older brother was executed by the government and his family was expelled to the southern parts of Iraq.

After the fall of Saddam in 2003, he became the representative of the Iraqi Turkmen Front in his native Musalla. After 2004, he served as representative of the party in Syria for 4 years. In 2008 at the Iraqi Turkmen Congress, he was elected as the party's head in Kirkuk. He was elected to the Iraqi Parliament from Kirkuk in the 2010 parliamentary elections.

In 2011, al-Salihi's home was damaged by a mortar attack, and in 2013 he survived an assassination attempt.

In May 2011, he succeeded Sadettin Ergeç and became the leader of the Iraqi Turkmen Front. In 2014 he became the deputy chairman of the party.

In 2014, al-Salihi was elected as chairman of the Iraqi Parliamentary Human Rights Committee.
