= Mariwan Halabjaee =

Iraqi writer and human rights activist (born 1963)

- مەریوان ھەڵەبجەیی
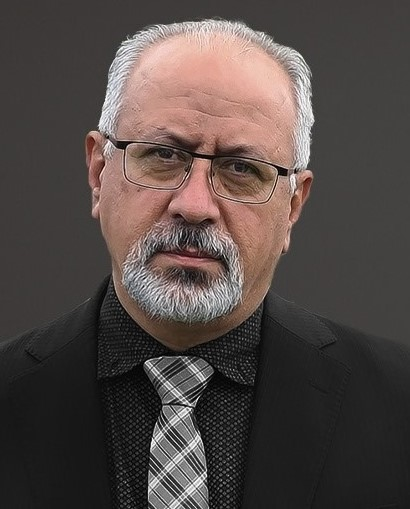
- Mariwan Halabjaee, Kurdish atheist and activist, critic and writer.
- Born: 9 June 1963 (age 63); Halabja
- Citizenship: Iraq; Norway
- Occupations: writer, essayist, critic, program presenter
- Writing career
- Language: Kurdish Sorani
- Subjects: Islam, Religion, Parapsychology, Ethics
- Notable works: Sharia and Women in the History of Islam (alternate title: Legislation and Women in Islamic History)

Mariwan Halabjaee or Mariwan Halabjayi (Kurdish: مەریوان ھەڵەبجەیی,; (Note: Alternate spellings: Mariwan, Marywan, Marewan / Halabjaee, Halabjay, Halabjayee, Halabjaye, Halabjayi, Halabjai.) born 9 June 1963) is an Iraqi Kurdish writer, public speaker, and human rights activist. He is the author of sixteen books and producer of over ninety documentaries, covering topics on theology, psychology, and human rights. He is the author of the book Sex, Sharia and Women in the History of Islam (alternate title: Sex, Legislation and Women in Islamic History). The book gained international fame when published in 2005, and has since been reprinted eleven times and translated into Arabic, Persian, and Pashto for millions of readers. It is about how Islam and Sharia are allegedly used to oppress Muslim women. "I wanted to prove how oppressed women are in Islam and that they have no rights," said Halabjaee. Halabjaee asserted the book was, "based on Islamic sources such as the Holy Quran, Muslim and Bukhari books (Note: See also Muhammad al-Bukhari.) and many more." Due to his controversial work, he is often referred to as "the Salman Rushdie of Iraqi Kurdistan".

== First fatwa in Iraqi Kurdistan ==
Halabjaee was reportedly forced to flee from Iraqi Kurdistan to Norway because the Islamic League of Kurdistan issued a "conditional" fatwa to kill him if he did not repent and apologize for writing his book. Halabjaee reported, "the mullahs and scholars said if I go to them and apologize they will give me 80 lashes and then refer me to the fatwa committee to decide if I am to be beheaded. They might forgive me, they might not."

Halabjaee allegedly received telephone calls saying, "Now, in 10 years or 15 years, we will kill you." Another time, Halabjaee reported, "the Islamists said once from the radio, if they found out where I was, they would blow themselves up with me." "With that book I wanted to defend women but the first thing I did was hurt my wife," said Halabjaee. As a result, Halabjaee went into hiding with his pregnant wife and three children.

Halabjaee fled Iraqi Kurdistan after the Kurdistan Regional Government (KRG) allegedly refused to offer him any protection or to arrest those who threatened his life. "The Kurdish authorities have not provided any protection from threats and fatwas," said Halabjaee, "any moment I am expecting a bullet or a hand grenade to be thrown into where I live."

In response to the Halabjaee affair, the KRG Minister of Religious Issues, Mohammad Gaznayi, told protestors that according to the law of Iraqi Kurdistan, "defamation" or "criticizing" religion or religious figures is a crime and its punishment is severe. "We will give those who attack our prophets a sentence so that they can be a lesson for everyone," said Gaznayi. (Note: Mohammad Gaznayi is the same KRG Minister of Religious Issues who said, "I consider that those who turn to Christianity pose a threat to society." See Kathleen Ridolfo (3 July 2005). "Iraq: Christians Face Threats From All Sides". Radio Free Europe / Radio Liberty.; Ayyub Kareem (17 November 2005). "Kurdish Christians Complain of Discrimination". Institute for War & Peace Reporting. Archived from the original on 7 April 2014.. Gaznayi also said people who turn to Christianity are "renegades" in the eyes of Islam. See Ayyub Kareem (17 November 2005). "Kurdish Christians Complain of Discrimination". Institute for War & Peace Reporting. Archived from the original on 7 April 2014..) Halabjaee was in possession of a warrant for his arrest issued by the Suleimaniya police department when he fled Iraqi Kurdistan.

In August 2006, Halabjaee was granted political asylum in Norway.

== Conviction in absentia for blasphemy ==
In December 2007, Halabjaee was convicted in absentia in Iraqi Kurdistan for the crime of blasphemy. A court in Halabja sentenced Halabjaee to prison for writing that Muhammad had 19 wives, married a 9-year-old when he was 54 years old, and committed murder and rape. Halabjaee remains in Norway. The sentence states that he will be arrested upon his return to Iraqi Kurdistan.

== Second fatwa in Norway ==
In September 2008, Iraqi Kurdish scholar and leader of extremist group Ansar al-Islam Mullah Krekar allegedly threatened to kill Halabjaee in an audio file published on the Kurdish website Renesans.nu. "I swear that we will not live if you live. Either you go before us, or we go before you," said Krekar. Mullah Krekar was the original leader of the Islamist group Ansar al-Islam in Kurdistan. Krekar compared Halabjaee with Salman Rushdie and Ayaan Hirsi Ali. Mullah Krekar, like Halabjaee, currently resides in Norway as a refugee. Since February 2003, Krekar has had an expulsion order against him in Norway. The order has been suspended, however, pending Iraqi government guarantees that Krekar will not face torture or execution.

In February 2012, Mullah Krekar confirmed in the Oslo District Court that he had issued a twenty-page fatwa against Halabjaee. The fatwa was sent to several hundred Islamic scholars around the world. While Krekar said he thought he might be able to "guarantee the safety" of Halabjaee, Krekar confirmed that his fatwa "implies" that it is "permissible" to kill Halabjaee in Oslo or anywhere else. Mullah Krekar compared Halabjaee to Theo van Gogh, the film director who was killed by an Islamist in the Netherlands in 2004.

On 26 March 2012, Krekar was sentenced to 5 years in prison for making death threats. He appealed. On 26 March 2012, Mullah Krekar was re-arrested for making threats against two Kurds and the Conservative Party leader Erna Solberg.

On 6 December 2012, the Court of Appeal acquitted Mullah Krekar of charges of incitement to terrorism, but found Krekar guilty of four counts of intimidation under aggravating circumstances. The Court of Appeal ordered that Krekar pay 130,000 kroner in damages compensation to each of the three Kurds he threatened, and to serve two years and ten months in prison, less the 255 days he was in custody.
