= Mohammed Samaan Agha =

Minister of State for minorities' affairs of Iraq

- Muhammet Seman Ağaoğlu

Minister of State (for minorities' affairs)
- Incumbent
- Assumed office October 19 2026
- President: Nizar Amidi
- Prime Minister: Ali al-Zaidi
- Preceded by: Position Established

President of The Iraqi Turkmen Front
- Incumbent
- Assumed office April 13, 2025
- Preceded by: Hasan Turan

Governor of Kirkuk
- In office April 21 2026 – November 2026
- Appointed by: Kirkuk Provincial Council
- President: Nizar Amidi
- Prime Minister: Mohammed Shia' al-Sudani; Ali al-Zaidi
- Deputy: Rebwar Taha
- Preceded by: Rebwar Taha
- Succeeded by: Qahtan Wandawi

Personal details
- Born: 1982 Kirkuk, Iraqi Republic
- Party: Iraqi Turkmen Front
- Education: Kirkuk University (BA in computer software); Gazi University (BA in Turkish literature)
- Occupation: Politician

Mohammed Samaan Agha or Mohammed Sama'an Agha (Note: Arabic: محمد سمعان اغا; Turkish: Muhammet Seman Ağaoğlu; Sorani Kurdish: محەمەد سەمعان ئاغا) known as Mohammed Sama'an (Note: Arabic: محمد سمعان; Turkish: Muhammet Seman; Sorani Kurdish: محەمەد سەمعان) (born 1982) is an Iraqi Turkmen politician who has served as the Minister of State for minorities' affairs of Iraq since October 19, 2026. Agha has also been serving as the President of the Iraqi Turkmen Front since April 13, 2025. Formerly, Agha served as the Governor of Kirkuk from April 21, 2026, until November 2026.

== Early life and Education ==
He was born in Kirkuk, Iraqi Republic in 1982. and has earned 2 Bachelor's degrees, one in Turkish Literature from Gazi University, and the other in computer software in the University of Kirkuk.

== Career ==
=== President of Iraqi Turkmen Front ===
Agha became President of the Iraqi Turkmen Front on April 13, 2025.

=== Governor of Kirkuk ===
On April 16, 2026, the positions in the administration of Kirkuk Provincial Council were redistributed. During the session, 14 of the 16 members of the council were present; 12 of the 14 present members voted to formally accept the resignation of Patriotic Union of Kurdistan (PUK)'s Rebwar Taha as the Governor of Kirkuk Province. In the same session, Iraqi Turkmen Front (ITF)'s president and leading candidate Mohammed Sama'an Agha was elected as the governor of Kirkuk. He officially assumed office on April 21, 2026.

=== Minister of State ===
In October, 15 2026, the iraqi parliament held a meeting in which they voted to fulfill vacant ministerial positions, vacant deputy premiership and newly introduced ministerial positions, one of which was minister of state. in the meeting Samaan was nominated and elected as the Minister of State for Minorities' Affairs.

Later in October 18th, 2026, President of Iraq, Nizar Amidi, issued decrees and formally appointed the designated Ministers. Samaan took oath and assumed office as the Minister of State for Minorities' Affairs in October 19, 2026.

In Saturday, November 14, 2026, the Kirkuk Provincial Council held a meeting in which veteran turkmeni politician, Qahtan Wandawi was elected as Samaan's successor as the Governor of Kirkuk. Wandawi received 14 out of 15 votes in the election.

Wandawi received the presidential decree by president of iraq, Nizar Amedi on November 20, 2026 and was appointed as Governor of Kirkuk. 2 days later, in November 22, 2026 Wandawi took constitutional oath and was sworn in and assumed office as Governor of Kirkuk.

== See Also ==
- Iraqi Turkmen Front
- Iraqi Turkmens
