= 2001 Kurdistan Region municipal elections =

The Kurdistan Region municipal elections, 2001 were held on May 26, 2001 in the territories of Kurdistan which were under control of Massoud Barzani's Kurdistan Democratic Party (KDP), after the KDP's main rival, the Patriotic Union of Kurdistan (PUK) had held municipal elections in the territories they controlled, in February 2000. Aside from the ruling Kurdistan Democratic Party, another 14 political parties and a total of 1,000 candidates participated for 571 posts, in 85 municipalities. To ensure the elections were fair, a committee was established to observe the elections, which included United Nations staff. These local and foreign observes concluded the elections were generally fair.

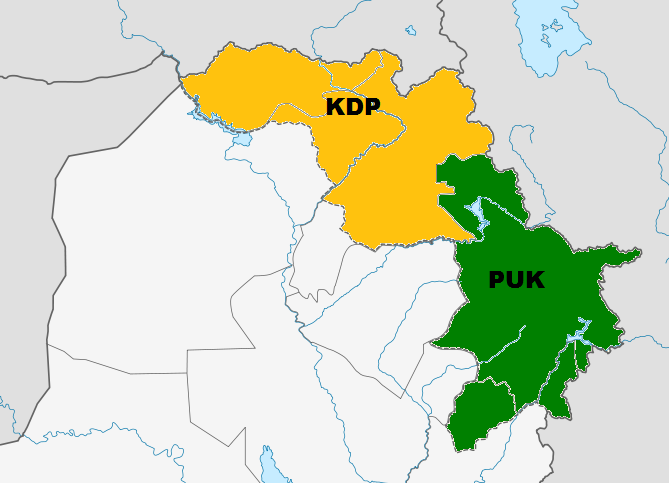
Territory controlled by the KDP after the Kurdish Civil War (1994-1998)

The elections resulted in a landslide victory for the Kurdistan Democratic Party, which won a majority in every single municipality and a total of 81% of the votes. A distant second place was the Kurdistan Islamic Union. A total of 22 women were elected into local councils. All mayor positions were won by the KDP.

Results:

	Hawler	Dahuk	Total
Eligible voters:	559,304	327,190	886,494
Ballots cast:	422,912	277,944	700,856
Turnout:	75.6%%	85.0%	79.0%
Votes for the KDP:	322,343	245,160	567,503
Percentage for the KDP:	76.2%	88.2%	81.0%
