= 2014 Kurdistan Region governorate elections =

- April 30, 2014

Aggregate 81 seats to the three Kurdistan Region governorates councils
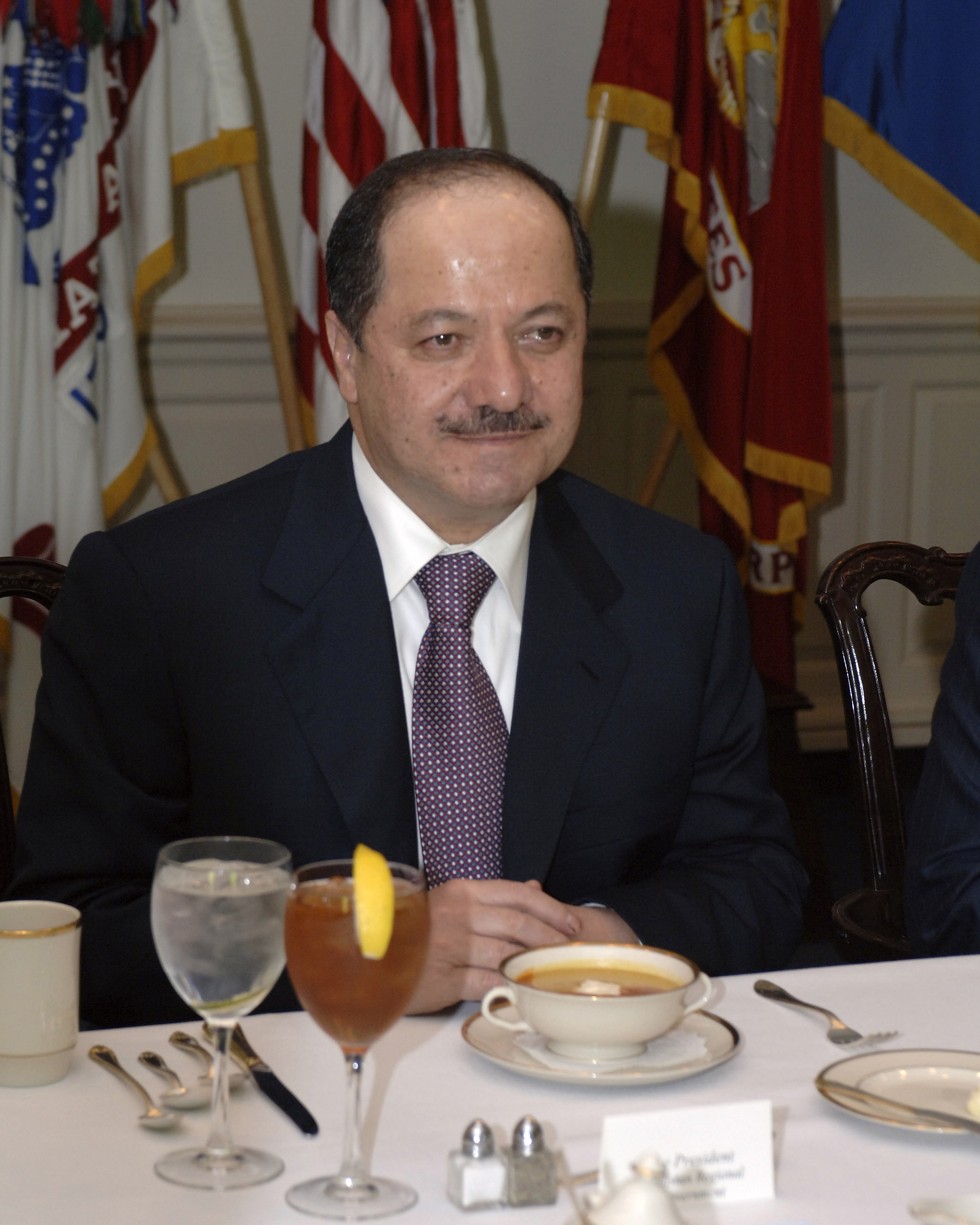

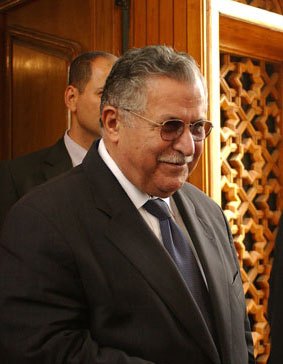

	First party	Second party	Third party
Leader	Massoud Barzani	Jalal Talabani	Nawshirwan Mustafa
Party	KDP	PUK	Gorran
Last election	61 seat 42.07%	48 seats 43.43%	–
Seats won	34	19	17
Seat change	▼27	▼29	▲17
Popular vote	816,654	528,122	490,572
Percentage	37,79%	24.44%	22.70%
Swing	▼4.28%	▼18.99%	▲22.70%
	Fourth party	Fifth party
Leader	Mohammed Faraj	Ali Bapir
Party	KIU	KIG
Last election	10 seats 7.56%	4 seats
Seats won	6	4
Seat change	▼4	0
Popular vote	155,972	117,848
Percentage	6.99%	5.53%
Swing	▼0.57%	0%

The Kurdistan Region Governorate elections were held on 30 April 2014. The elections for the three Kurdish governorates coincided with the elections for Iraqi parliament.

== Result ==
Party	Total Votes	Percentage	Total seats	Party Leader
Kurdistan Democratic Party	816,654	37,79%	34	Massoud Barzani
Patriotic Union of Kurdistan	528,122	24,44%	19	Jalal Talabani
Movement for Change	490,572	22,70%	17	Nawshirwan Mustafa
Kurdistan Islamic Union	150,972	6,99%	6	Salaheddine Bahaaeddin
Islamic Group of Kurdistan	113,364	5,25%	4	Ali Bapir
Other Parties	56,354	2,60%	10	-
Total	2,161,128	100%	90	-

=== Erbil Governorate ===
Party	Total votes	Percentage	Seats	Party Leader
Kurdistan Democratic Party	372,607	49.31%	12	Massoud Barzani
Patriotic Union of Kurdistan	168,603	22.31%	6	Jalal Talabani
Movement for Change	108,117	14.31%	4	Nawshirwan Mustafa
Islamic Group of Kurdistan	57,907	7.66%	2	Ali Bapir
Kurdistan Islamic Union	27,713	3.67%	1	Salaheddine Bahaaeddin
Other parties	19,287	2.57%	5	
Total	754,234	100%	30	

=== Duhok Governorate ===
Party	Total votes	Percentage	Seats	Party Leader
Kurdistan Democratic Party	357,392	71.46%	19	Massoud Barzani
Kurdistan Islamic Union	62,162	12.43%	3	Salaheddine Bahaaeddin
Patriotic Union of Kurdistan	40.796	8.16%	2	Jalal Talabani
Movement for Change	22,855	4.57%	1	Nawshirwan Mustafa
Islamic Group of Kurdistan	4.221	0.84%	0	Ali Bapir
Other parties	16,956	3.39%	3	
Total	500.161	100%	28	

=== Sulaymaniyah Governorate ===
Party	Total votes	Percentage	Seats	Party Leader
Movement for Change	359,600	39.66%	12	Nawshirwan Mustafa
Patriotic Union of Kurdistan	318,723	35.15%	11	Jalal Talabani
Kurdistan Democratic Party	86,655	9.57%	3	Massoud Barzani
Kurdistan Islamic Union	66,097	7.29%	2	Salaheddine Bahaaeddin
Islamic Group of Kurdistan	55,457	6.12%	2	Ali Bapir
Kurdistan Alliance	10,512	1.16%	1	
Other parties	9,599	1.06%	1	
Total	906,643	100%	32	
