= Results of the 2023 Iraqi governorate election (Assyrian seats) =

The Iraqi governorate elections were held for the first time in almost 10 years on December 18, 2023, after many delays, mostly due to the demonstrations demanding the end of the existing political system in 2019. Governorates under the KRG did not participate. For the Assyrians, reserved seats were allocated in the following governorates: Basra, Baghdad, Kirkuk, and Ninewa. While the goal of these seats being reserved is to have Assyrian community representation in the respective governorate councils, Iraqi election law allows anyone, be it Assyrian or not, to vote for them. This had led to the Assyrian reserved seats be hijacked by pro-Iranian parties, with mobilization of mostly Shia Arabs voting for the Babylon Movement.

Going into the elections, the pro-Iranian affiliated Babylon Movement was looking to win seats in the governorates for the first time, matching its success in the two previous Iraqi parliament elections. Independent parties continued to complain of the reserved Assyrian seats being at risk of taken by candidates of the Babylon Movement, through votes by non-Assyrian voters.

The other two main groups were the Athra Alliance, headed by the Assyrian Democratic Movement (ADM) and the Hammurabi Coalition, a group formed by the Kurdistan Democratic Party-member and KRG Minister of Communication during the time of the elections, Ano Abdoka.

Driven by the hope of countering Babylon Movement's recent big wins through votes generally outside of the Assyrian community, ADM established the Athra Alliance in July 2023, and was joined by the Chaldean Syriac Assyrian Popular Council, Assyrian Patriotic Party, Beth Nahrin Patriotic Union and Sons of Mesopotamia. Four days prior to the elections, the alliance issued as statement complaining about other parties spreading false rumors that their candidates were withdrawing from the elections. The statement assured that the alliance is still participating and stressed their candidates are the best to represent the community.

Ano Abdoka's Hammurabi Coalition was joined by the Chaldean Catholic Church-backed Chaldean League, the Chaldean National Council, the Chaldean Democratic Union Party and the Syriac Assembly Movement.

== Results ==
Winner

=== Basra Governorate ===
Candidate	List/Party	Votes	Notes
Fahram Hayek Agnateos Agheek	Independent	1,375	
Nael Ghanem Aziz Hanna Sako	Babylon Movement	954	
Faris Farang Nasuri Salman Bata	Hammurabi Coalition	383	

=== Baghdad Governorate ===
Candidate	List/Party	Votes	Notes
Faez Sabah Aboush Ayoub Saman	Babylon Movement	3,340	
Remon Jameel Hermiz Yousif Hamuda	Hammurabi Coalition	303	Head of administration of Chaldean League Erbil branch
Shrara Yousef Zara Ishaq	Athra Alliance	195	Sister of Lara Zara, Alqosh sub-district manager

=== Kirkuk Governorate ===
Candidate	List/Party	Votes	Notes
Ameel Putros Qanstantin Ibrahim Agha	Independent	1,493	
Anjel Ziya Shiba Al-Barwari	Babylon Movement	1,301	
Walantina Walem Yousef Jalu Yousef	Athra Alliance	793	
Luay Adel Yousef Petros Al-Qas Rufael	Hammurabi Coalition	516	
Karam Ramez Ostin Ablahad Ostin	Independent	235	

=== Ninewa Governorate ===
Candidate	List/Party	Votes	Notes
Rabea Yousef Elias Jajo Soran	Babylon Movement	6,022	Head of Hamdaniya Agriculture Department
Haithem Salem Baho Petros Kaki	Hammurabi Coalition	3,240	
Ma’rib Imad Elias Rafo Hanno	Athra Alliance	1,272	Head of Beth Nahrain Patriotic Union
Reyath Qariyo Hanna Mikha Qariyo	Independent	438	

== See also ==
- 2023 Iraqi governorate elections
- Assyrian politics in Iraq
