= 2009 Kirkuk governorate election =

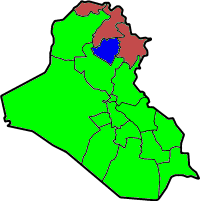
Provinces elected in January are Green; Kirkuk is Blue and Iraqi Kurdistan is Red

Governorate or provincial elections were held in Kirkuk Governorate in 2009 to replace the governorate council elected in the 2005 Iraqi governorate elections. The remaining governorates outside Iraqi Kurdistan held elections on 31 January 2009.

== Delay ==
The original draft proposed delaying the election in Kirkuk Governorate until after the referendum to decide its precise status has been held. However, a group of Turkmen and Arab MPs proposed a power-sharing clause, establishing a provincial council consisting of ten Kurds, ten Arabs, ten Turkmens and two Assyrians. This clause was included in the draft election bill put to the Iraqi Council of Representatives in July 2008, and led to the Kurdish parties walking out in protest, complaining "If you already pick the seats before the election, why vote?" The law was nonetheless approved on 22 July 2008. However, President Jalal Talabani, who is Kurdish, and Vice-President Adel Abdul Mahdi, a Shi'ite Arab, have agreed they would reject the bill, and hence it would be sent back to the Council of Representatives to reconsider.

Parliamentary summer recess started on 30 July 2008, but a special session was called for 3 August 2008 to find a solution to the Kirkuk issue. At that meeting, no solution was reached; at another meeting on 4 August 2008, lawmakers postponed the session to 5 August 2008, and on that date to 6 August 2008. It was then postponed to 9 September 2008, with a committee working on a compromise solution until then. At that session, no resolution was reached, and negotiations continued on 10 September 2008 in the form of a special six-member panel formed for this occasion. The law was finally passed on 24 September 2008 and the election is expected to be held by 31 January 2009; the compromise was that Kirkuk would be dealt with separately, and elections in Kirkuk and the three Kurdish autonomous provinces will be held at a later time. A special panel was to work on a solution on Kirkuk and report back by 31 March 2009.

The United Nations Special Representative for Iraq, Staffan de Mistura proposed holding elections in all governorates except Kirkuk, and deferring the Kirkuk elections for six months in order to find an acceptable compromise. A draft bill based on this proposal was debated on 6 August and accepted by the Kurdistani Alliance but opposed by the Iraqi Turkmen Front, Iraqi Accord Front and Sadrist Movement who objected to the draft law's reference to the Kirkuk status referendum and insisted on delaying the entire elections until a solution was found.

The panel was given a two-month extension to its deadline to 31 May and then a further week to 6 June.
