= Service and Reform List =

The Service and Reform List (also Service and Reformation List) was an electoral coalition formed to contest the Iraqi Kurdistan legislative election of 2009 by the Kurdistan Islamic Union, the Islamic Group in Kurdistan, the Kurdistan Socialist Party and the Future Party.
