= Kirkuk is Our Strength and Will Coalition =

Political coalition

Kirkuk is Our Strength and Will Coalition: هاوپەیمانی کەرکووک هێز و ئیرادەمانە (Sorani Kurdish); تحالف كركوك قوتنا وإرادتنا (Arabic)
- Leader: Rebwar Taha
- Chairman: Aso Mamand
- Founded: 2023
- Member parties: Patriotic Union of Kurdistan; Kurdistan Communist Party
- Country: Iraq
- Province: Kirkuk Governorate
- Seats in the Kirkuk Provincial Council: 5 / 16

Kirkuk is Our Strength and Will Coalition Or Kirkuk is Our Strength and Will Alliance (Sorani Kurdish: هاوپەیمانی کەرکووک هێز و ئیرادەمانە / Arabic: تحالف كركوك قوتنا وإرادتنا) was a coalition formed between The Patriotic Union of Kurdistan and The Kurdistan Communist Party for The 2023 provincial election in Kirkuk Governorate.

== Election results ==
The Coalition was the most voted party in the elections with 157,649 votes, getting 28.201% of the total votes. and winning 5 out of the 16 seats in the Kirkuk provincial council.

== Most successful individual candidates ==
Besides the coalition being the most voted party in the 2023 Kirkuk Provincial Election two candidates in the list of candidates were amongst the top 3 most voted individual candidates in the province.

=== Nashat Shahwez ===
Nashat Shahwez whom was candidate number 3 for the coalition's list had the most individual votes in the party and also the entire kirkuk province with 42,166 votes.

=== Rebwar Taha ===
Leader of the coalition and head of the list, Rebwar Taha was the second most voted candidate in the party and the third most voted individual candidate in the entire province of kirkuk with 29,861 votes. He was later elected as the Governor of Kirkuk province.

== See also ==
- Patriotic Union of Kurdistan
- Kurdistan Communist Party
- Rebwar Taha
