= 2023 Iraqi governorate elections =

4th Iraqi governorate elections

- 18 December 2023

447 seats comprising 15 of the 18 governorates of Iraq
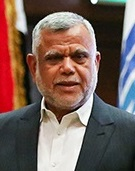

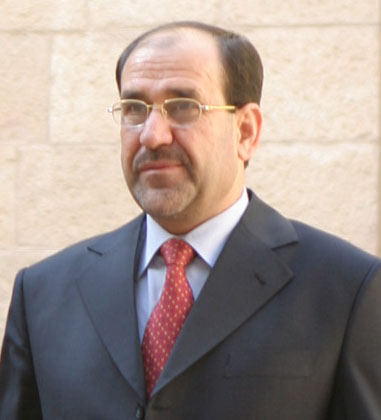

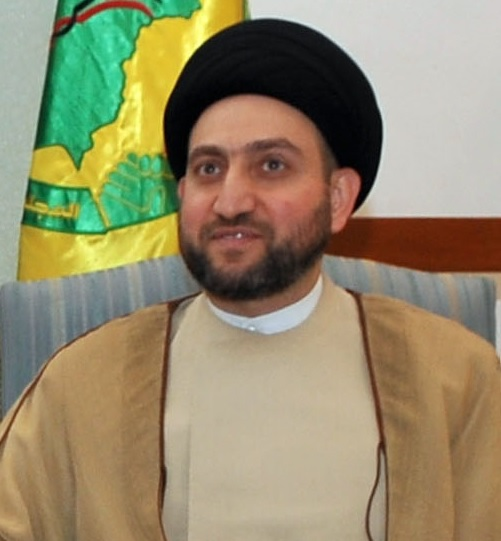
	First party	Second party	Third party
Leader	Hadi al-Amiri	Nouri al-Maliki	Ammar al-Hakim
Party	Fatah	State of Law	NWM
Last election	New	102	New
Seats won	43	35	23
Seat change	New	▼67	New
Popular vote	681,413	576,776	384,719
Percentage	11.21%	9.49%	6.33%
Swing	New	▼15	New
- Winning coalitions/parties by Governorate. We Build Alliance Progress Party State of Law Coalition Kirkuk is our Strength and Will Coalition Nineveh for its People Patriotic Masses Party Tasmim Alliance Local list Elections not held

Governorate or provincial elections were scheduled to be held in Iraq on 20 April 2020, to replace the provincial councils in the governorates of Iraq that were elected in the 2013 Iraqi governorate elections and, in Kurdistan Region, in the 2014 elections. The elections were delayed indefinitely in November 2019, amidst demonstrations demanding the end of the existing political system.

In the summer of 2020, after protests around the country specifically demanded the dissolution of provincial administrations, the ruling parties decided to postpone any decision on when to hold new provincial elections until after the early parliamentary election planned for October 2021.

In March 2023, Iraq's parliament passed a resolution setting the provincial elections on 18 December 2023. Campaigning started on 1 November.

== Vote Participation ==
Voting took place on 18 December 2023, in all of Iraq's governorates except the Kurdistan Region of Iraq, with a turnout of 39%.

Governorate	Total number of voters	Number of voters who voted	Turnout
Basra	1,398,862	587,593	42%
Maysan	523,391	140,807	27%
Al-Qādisiyyah	602,920	220,367	37%
Dhi Qar	945,258	283,364	30%
Najaf	702,704	217,275	31%
Muthanna	433,975	191,433	44%
Baghdad (Rusafa)	1,854,244	357,414	19%
Baghdad (Karkh)	1,541,764	452,250	29%
Karbala	557,992	214,940	39%
Babylon	969,698	373,803	39%
Diyala	892,710	359,364	40%
Anbar	787,229	441,032	56%
Wasit	648,669	243,935	36%
Saladin Governorate	703,563	400,936	57%
Kirkuk	813,590	525,971	65%
Ninawa	1,695,566	882,479	52%
Total	15,108,135	5,892,963	39%

== Preliminary results ==
=== Total seats ===
Party	Total votes	Percentage	Total seats
Fatah Alliance	681,413	11.21%	43
State of Law Coalition	576,776	9.49%	35
Progress Party	509,172	8.37%	21
Alliance of National State Forces	384,719	6.33%	23
National Sovereignty Alliance	315,749	5.19%	14
Tasmim	281,370	4.63%	12
Kurdistan Democratic Party	193,330	3.18%	6
Azem	191,168	3.14%	10
National Determination Alliance	187,245	3.08%	8
Kirkuk is our strength and will Coalition	157,649	2.59%	5
Al-Asas Alliance	153,078	2.52%	5
Good News, Iraq	151,146	2.49%	8
Nineveh for Its People	148,769	2.45%	5
National Party of the Masses	132,100	2.17%	5
Ishraqat Kanoon	130,534	2.15%	6
Civil Democratic Alliance	129,978	2.14%	6
Total	6,079,979	100%	447

=== Diyala Governorate ===
Party	Votes	%
Diyala National Alliance	94,330	23.71
Progress Party	73,779	18.54
Al-Siyada Alliance	68,797	17.29
Azem Alliance	40,652	10.22
Diyala Eligibility	39,677	9.97
Al-Asas Coalition	26,529	6.67
Patriotic Union of Kurdistan	22,400	5.63
Thabitun	13,376	3.36
Kurdistan Democratic Party	6,202	1.56
Ishraqat Kanoon	3,596	0.90
Alliance of Civil Forces	3,504	0.88
State of Law Coalition	3,197	0.80
Emergence	1,006	0.25
Civic Values Alliance	485	0.12
Kurdistan Socialist Democratic Party	133	0.03
Other	123	0.03
Independent	56	0.01
Total	397,842	100.00

=== Kirkuk Governorate ===
The total number of votes was 559,022. The Participation rate was 65%.

Total available seats were 16. 11 for male candidates (everyone), 4 for female candidates (everyone), and 1 for Christian candidates.

Sources: Official IHEC website page 13

The following electoral results are 15 out of 16.

Party name	Party Code	Votes	Percentage	15 Out of 16
Kirkuk is our strength and will Coalition	142	157,649	28.201%	5
Arab Alliance in Kirkuk	122	102,545	18.344%	3
Iraqi Turkmen Front	109	75,166	13.446%	2
Command Alliance (Al-Qiyādah)	166	61,435	10.990%	2
Kurdistan Democratic Party	197	52,278	9.352%	2
Al-Uruba Alliance	175	47,919	8.572%	1
New Generation Movement	167	25,910	4.635%	None
Our Kirkuk (Kerkūkunā)	136	22,701	4.061%	None
Ma'ālim Kerkūk Alliance	163	6,879	1.231%	None
Kurdistan Socialist Democratic Party	202	303	0.054%	None
Civil Democratic Alliance	181	246	0.044%	None
Al-Thiqah Party	191	191	0.034%	None

The following election results are for Christian quota (Kota) seats, 1 out of 16.

Party name	Party Code	Votes	Percentage	1 out of 16
Babylon Movement	164	1,703	0.305%	1
Ameel Butrus Kostantin Ibrahim Agha	102	1,566	0.280%	None
Athra Alliance	140	816	0.146%	None
Ismael Yahya Essa Dakhel Al Qaysi	154	519	0.093%	None
Hamurabi Coalition	177	397	0.071%	None
Karam Ramiz Wastin Abhalad Wastin	154	154	0.028%	None

The following election results consists of all lists including Christian parties & Independent candidates.

Party name	Party Code	Votes	Percentage	Seats
Kirkuk is our strength and will Coalition	142	157,649	28.20%	5
Arab Alliance in Kirkuk	122	102,545	18.34%	3
Iraqi Turkmen Front	109	75,166	13.45%	2
Command Alliance (Al-Qiyādah)	166	61,435	10.99%	2
Kurdistan Democratic Party	197	52,278	9.35%	2
Al-Uruba Alliance	175	47,919	8.57%	1
New Generation Movement	167	25,910	4.63%	None
Our Kirkuk (Kerkūkunā)	136	22,701	4.06%	None
Ma'ālim Kerkūk Alliance	163	6,879	1.23%	None
Babylon Movement	164	1703	0.30%	1 (Quota)
Ameel Butrus Kostantin - Independent	101	1566	0.28%	None
Athra Alliance	140	816	0.15%	None
Ismael Yahya Essa - Independent	193	754	0.13%	None
Hammurabi Coalition	177	519	0.09%	None
Kurdistan Socialist Democratic Party	202	397	0.07%	None
Civil Democratic Alliance	181	303	0.05%	None
Al Thiqah Party	191	246	0.04%	None
Karam Ramiz Wastin - Independent	140	236	0.04%	None

=== Wasit Governorate ===
Party	Votes	%
A More Beautiful Wasit	89,971	40.72
State of Law Coalition	30,245	13.69
We Build Alliance	29,689	13.44
Alliance of National State Forces	28,414	12.86
Wasit Tent Alliance	12,782	5.78
Civic Values Alliance	11,587	5.24
Rejoice Iraq	8,655	3.92
Ishraqat Kanoon	4,806	2.18
Iraqi Base Coalition	2,162	0.98
Ajmal Alliance	2,129	0.96
Other	523	0.24
Total	220,963	100.00

== See also ==
- Results of the 2023 Iraqi governorate election (Assyrian seats)
