= Turkmen Democratic Movement =

Iraqi Turkmen political party

The Turkmen Democratic Movement (Turkish: Türkmen Demokratik Hareketi) is a political party in Iraq that is headed by Kalkhi Najmaddin Noureddin. It split off from the Turkey-backed Iraqi Turkmen Front in 2004 by members who believed that the intervention of Turkey in Iraqi Turkmen politics is not getting the Iraqi Turkmen community anywhere. It supports the annexation of Kirkuk to the Kurdistan Region, and an end to Turkish involvement in Iraqi Turkmen affairs. The party won 3 seats in the Kurdistan National Assembly at the 2009 election, making them the leading Turkmen political force in that body. The party sought to obtain a ministerial portfolio following those elections.

At the 2013 elections, the party lost all three of its seats to the Turkmen Development List and Turkmen Change and Renewal, while the Erbil Turkmen List and Iraqi Turkmen Front held on to one seat each.
