= Daquq District =

Daquq District قضاء داقوق
- District
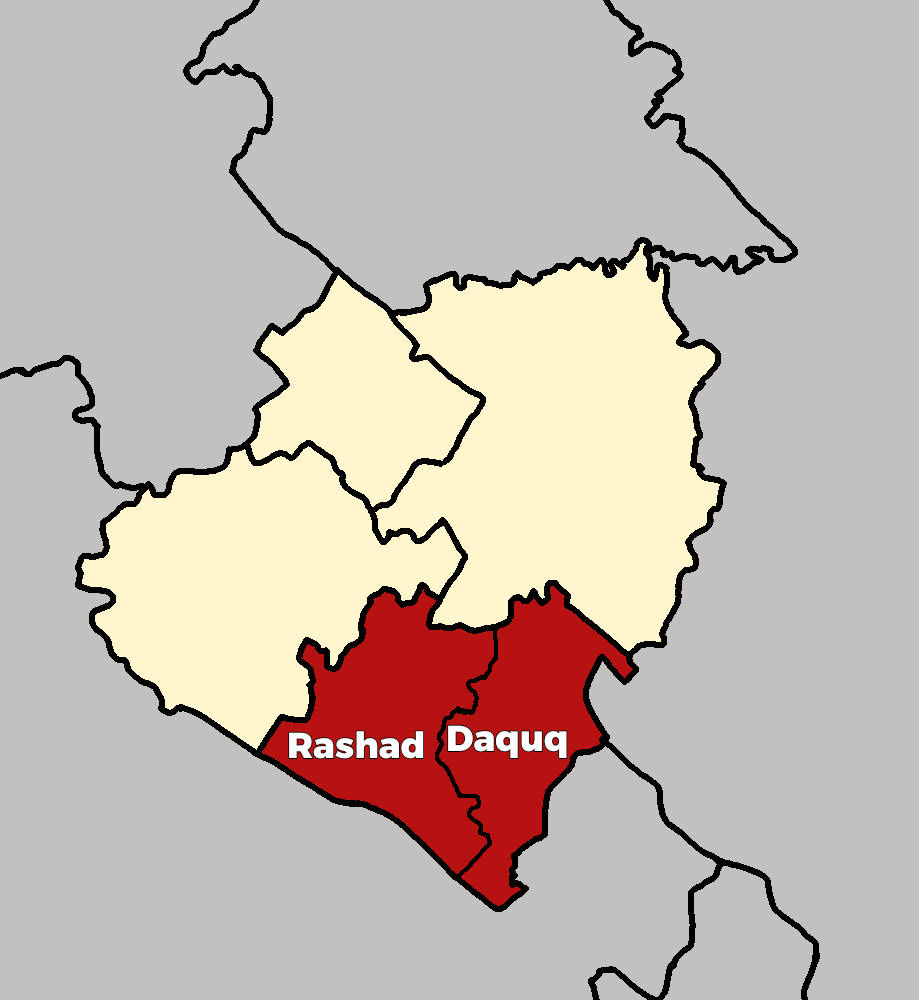
- Location of Daquq District within Kirkuk Governorate
- Country: Iraq
- Governorate: Kirkuk Governorate
- Seat: Daquq

Area
  - Total: 2,663 km^{2} (1,028 sq mi)

Population (2024)
  - Total: 85,773
  - Density: 32.21/km^{2} (83.42/sq mi)
- Time zone: UTC+3 (AST)
- Area code: +964 50

Daquq District (Arabic: قضاء داقوق, romanized: qaḍāʾ Daquq) is a district in eastern Kirkuk Governorate, northern Iraq. Its administrative center is the city of Daquq. The district has a Shia Turkmen majority.

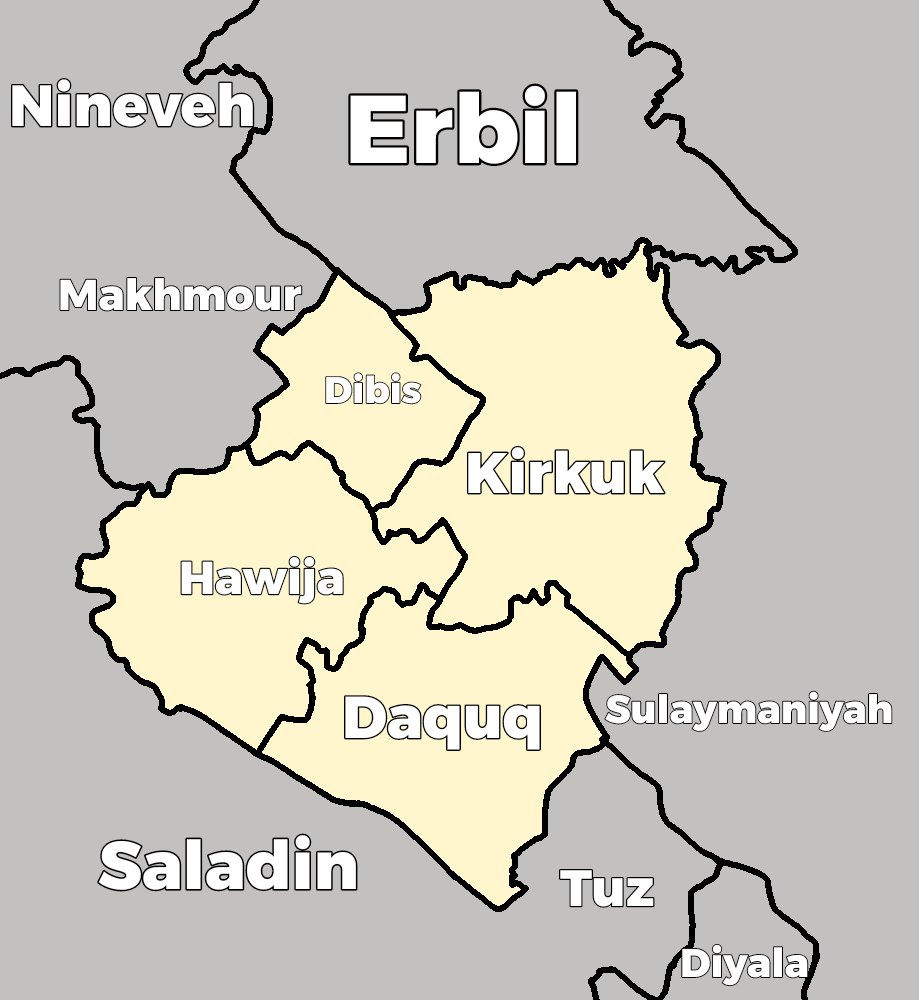
Districts of Kirkuk Governorate
