= Arab Alliance in Kirkuk =

Political party in Iraq

Arab Alliance in Kirkuk التحالف العربي في کرکوك
- Abbreviation: AAK (unofficial)
- President: Rakan Al-Jabouri
- Founder: Rakan Al-Jabouri
- Founded: 20 October 2018; 8 years ago
- Headquarters: Kirkuk, Iraq
- Ideology: Arab interests in Kirkuk
- Council of Representatives of Iraq: 1 / 329
- Kirkuk Provincial Council: 3 / 16

Arab Alliance in Kirkuk or Arab Coalition in Kirkuk (Arabic: التحالف العربي في کرکوك / Sorani Kurdish: هاوپەیمانی عەرەبی لە کەرکووک) is a regional political party representing the Arab population in Kirkuk. It was founded on October 20, 2018.

== Formation ==
Although the party's official announcement was on October 20, 2018, the party was actually first recognized by the Independent High Electoral Commission earlier in January 2018. It began as a coalition of 7 Arabic parties before being formally organised as a party. On October 20, 2018,the Arab alliance issued a statement which carried the signatures of Rakan Al-Jabouri the acting governor of kirkuk at the time as well as signatures of representatives of Saairun, Asa'ib Ahl al-Haq, Badr Organization, Al-Wataniya and The Arab Project led by Khamis al-Khanjar. It announced in a statement that the party would serve as the voice for the Arabs of kirkuk.

It called on Prime Minister-designate, Adil Abdul-Mahdi to guarantee fulfilling the demands of Arabs of Kirkuk, mainly the reconstruction of the 116 villages that were destroyed by the Peshmerga as well as revealing the fate of thousands of detained Arabs in Kurdistan Region prisons. Arabs of Kirkuk have often accused the Kurds of destroying Arab villages during the war against ISIS in 2014, also accusing Kurdish Security Forces that they have arrested thousands of Sunni Arab citizens and have transferred them to secret prisons in the Kurdistan Region.

== Elections ==
=== 2018 parliamentary election ===
The 2018 Iraqi parliamentary election was the first election that the Arab alliance in Kirkuk had participated in. Even though at the time the party was just a coalition rather than an organized party, they still managed to get 84,102 votes and won 3 seats, with their 3 successful candidates being

- Mohammed Ali Tamim
  Head of list and had 21,593 votes.
- Khalid Hammad Alawi
  was the second most voted candidate in the coalition with 11,020 votes.
- Rakan Saeed Al-Jabouri
  third most voted candidate with 10,433 votes and won a seat but decided to remain as the acting governor of kirkuk.

=== 2021 parliamentary election ===
The 2021 Iraqi parliamentary election was the party's first election following its official recognition as a party. In the election, the party received 26,414 and won one seat only. Rakan Saeed Al-Jabouri was their winning candidate with 14,684 votes but he decided to remain as governor of kirkuk and Wasfi Al-Asi took oath in the Iraqi Council of Representatives replacing Rakan Al-Jabouri.

=== 2023 provincial election ===
In the 2023 provincial election, Arab Alliance in kirkuk was the second most voted party just behind The Kirkuk is our Strength and Will Coalition. The AAK had 102,545 votes and won 3 seats and became the second largest bloc in the Kirkuk Pronvicial Council.

- Most voted candidate
  The party's head of list, Rakan Saeed Al-Jabouri was their most voted candidate with 38,689 votes.

=== 2025 Iraqi Parliamentary Election ===
In the 2025 Iraqi parliamentary election, Arab Alliance in Kirkuk was the fifth most voted party in kirkuk with 53,046 votes and won one seat in the Iraqi Council of Representatives.

== Election results ==
=== AAK in parliamentary elections ===
Election	President	Votes	%	Seats	+/–	Position
2018	Rakan Al-Jabouri	84,102	0.81%	3 / 329	New	20th
2021	Rakan Al-Jabouri	26,414	0.30%	1 / 329	▼2	▼35th
2025	Rakan Al-Jabouri	53,046	0.47%	1 / 329	Steady	35th

=== AAK in provincial elections ===
Election	President	Votes	%	Seats	+/–	Position
2023	Rakan Al-Jabouri	102,545	18.344%	3 / 16	New	2nd

== See also ==
- Rakan Al-Jabouri
- Kirkuk Governorate
