= Kurdistan Alliance =

Kurdistan Alliance may refer to:

- Democratic Patriotic Alliance of Kurdistan, the main Kurdish list in the 2005 Iraqi election
- Kurdistani List, a Kurdish election list in Iraq since 2009
