= Turkmen People's Party =

- Leader: Turhan ketene
- Spokesperson: Turhan Ketene
- Founded: 28 February 1997
- Headquarters: Kirkuk
- Ideology: Turkmen interests

Website
- www.angelfire.com/tn/halk/bildiri.html

The Turkmen People's Party, or Türkmen Halk Partisi, is a political party representing the Turkmen minority in Iraq. The Turkmen People's Party (Türkmen Halk Partisi), founded in Ankara in 1997, was repressed under Saddam Hussein but has been able to operate freely since the regime was removed by U.S. and allied forces in the Iraq War.

== Overview ==
Following the Lausanne Agreement, attempts were made to divide and exploit the Iraqi Turkomans. The dictatorial regime that captured the government in Iraq increased their assimilation policies towards the Turkomans living in Iraq and tried to erase their identity via assimilation policies present in the national political agenda. In response, the Turkmen People's Party was founded.

The party seeks to form a central government for the democratic Iraqi Republic, by negotiating with their national, religious and political adversaries to reach an agreement that has minimum similarities among the participants. Thereby they can accept and sign up on a government which all of the said parties shall establish agreement.
