= Salahaddin Bahaaddin =

Secretary-General of the Kurdistan Islamic Union

Salahaddin Mohammed Bahaaddin
- صلاح الدين محمد بهاء الدين

Secretary General of the Kurdistan Islamic Union
- Incumbent
- Assumed office 2016
- Preceded by: Mohammed Faraj
- In office 1994–2008
- Preceded by: New office
- Succeeded by: Hadi Ali

Member of the Governing Council
- In office July 2003 – 28 June 2004
- Preceded by: Council created
- Succeeded by: Council dissolved

Personal details
- Born: Salah Mohammed Bahaadin; 1950 (age 75–76) Tawella, Halabja, Sulaymaniyah, Iraq
- Citizenship: Iraqi
- Party: Kurdistan Islamic Union
- Profession: Politician, Teacher
- Website: https://salahaddinbahaaddin.com/

Salahaddin Mohammed Bahaaddin Sadiq (Kurdish: سەڵاحەددین محەممەد بەھائەددین سادق; Arabic: صلاح الدين محمد بهاء الدين صادق) (born July 1, 1950, in Tawela, a town referring to Halabja) is a Kurdish Iraqi politician. He is a graduate of The House of Teachers 1969. He is the co-founder and current Secretary-General of the Kurdistan Islamic Union, and a former member of the Iraqi Governing Council.

== Career ==
=== Teacher ===
He worked as a teacher from 1971 to 1981. Then he was ordered to be arrested by the former Iraqi regime. After he refused to join the Iraqi Army, he was dismissed from his career. Having refused to join the Baath Party, he was tortured and faced the threat of further violence until he left Iraq and spent 10 years in diaspora, living in Iran, Turkey and the Gulf countries. He then returned to his homeland during the Kurdish uprising in 1991.

=== Secretary-General of the Kurdistan Islamic Union ===
Salaheddin participated in founding Kurdistan Islamic Union on February 6, 1994. In the first General Conference he was elected as the Secretary General of the party. Later, in the second, the third, and the fourth Conferences he was also elected as the Secretary General. Later succeeded by Hadi Ali and Mohammed Faraj, in 2016 he was again elected Secretary-General.

=== Member of Iraqi Governing Council ===
After the fall of the Iraqi government led by Saddam Hussein, he was determined to be a member of the Iraqi Governing Council which consisted of 25 Iraqi figures, five of whom were Kurdish. He later became a member of Iraqi National Assembly. Now, he has committed himself as the Secretary General of Kurdistan Islamic Union.

During his lifetime, he has been involved in arts, intellectuality, ideology, and promotion of Islam. He has written several books and articles in these fields both in Kurdish and Arabic.
