= Saadeddin Arkej =

Iraqi politician

Honorable Dr. Sadettin Ergeç

Honorary Leader of Iraqi Turkmen Front
- Incumbent
- Assumed office 15 December 2005

Personal details
- Born: 1948 (age 77–78) Kirkuk, Iraq
- Party: Iraqi Turkmen Front (ITF)
- Website: http://www.kerkuk.net/default.aspx?dil=2057

Saadeddin Mohammed Amin Arkej (Arabic: سعد الدين محمد أمين أركيج, Turkish: Sadettin Ergeç; born 1948), is an Iraqi Turkmen politician and the honorary leader of the Iraqi Turkmen Front (ITF) political party. Arkej was elected chairman of the Iraqi Turkmen Front in June 2005. In December 2005, he was elected as the sole member of the Iraqi Council of Representatives (CoR) on the ITF list.

== See also ==
- Government of the Islamic Republic of Iran
