= Kirkuk Provincial Council =

Kirkuk Pronvicial Council

Type
- Type: Unicameral

Leadership
- Chairman: Mohammed Hafidh
- Deputy Chairman: Nashat Shahwez

Structure
- Seats: 16
- Political groups: Kirkuk is Our Strength and Will Coalition (5); Arab Alliance in Kirkuk (3); Kurdistan Democratic Party (2); Iraqi Turkmen Front (2); Command Alliance (Al-Qiyada) (2); Al-Uruba Alliance (1); Babylon Movement (1) (Note: Quota seat)

The Kirkuk Provincial Council (Sorani Kurdish: ئەنجومەنی پارێزگای كەركووک, Arabic: مجلس محافظة كركوك) is the provincial council of the Kirkuk Governorate, based in Kirkuk, Iraq.

== History ==
=== Arab and Turkmen boycotts ===
In November 2006, Arab and Turkmen members of the council withdrew, claiming that the Kurdish majority, which holds 26 of the 41 seats on the council, had excluded them from decision-making and governance. Arab members returned to the council in December 2007 after a new power-sharing deal was agreed.

== Committees ==
The council has formed a number of committees.

The principle of consensus, which was adopted by the Iraqi National Assembly in forming its committees and in forming the Iraqi Transitional Government, has been adopted by KPC in forming its committees. One of the committees is Article 58 and the Victims of Ethnic Cleansing Policies Committee to follow up the procedures of normalizing the situation in Kirkuk Province according to the new Iraqi Constitution.

=== Human rights committee ===
When in early 2013, a survey conducted by Iraqi women's organization Pana and Iraqi-German NGO WADI revealed a still high prevalence of female genital mutilation of 38% in Kirkuk province, the provincial council's Human rights committee disputed the data, decrying a loss of reputation.

== Members ==
Member	Block	Membership Turns	Political Affiliation	Position
Rizgar Ali HamaJan	KBL	2	Patriotic Union of Kurdistan (PUK)	Chairman of Kirkuk Provincial Council
Rebwar Fayq Talabani	KBL	1	Kurdistan Islamic Union	Deputy Chairman of KPC
Mohamed Kamal	KBL	2	Kurdistan Democratic Party of Iraq (KDP)	Security Committee
Ahmed Abdullah Askari	KBL	2	PUK	Projects, Reconstruction & Public Services Committee
Awad Mohamed Ameen	KBL	1	Kurdistan Toilers' Party	Public Affairs Committee
Dilshad Pirot Aziz	KBL	1	Independent	Projects, Reconstruction & Public Services Committee
Babakir Sidiq Ahmed	KBL	1	PUK	Article 58 & The Victims Of Policies & Processes Of Ethnic Cleansing Committee
Galawezh Abdul-Jabbar Jabbari	KBL	1	PUK	Security & Public Safety Committee
Azad Sabir Jabbari	KBL	1	PUK	Agriculture & Irrigation Committee
Layla Hassan Shukur	KBL	1	PUK	
Perween Mohamed Ameen	KBL	1	KDP	Education & Higher Education Committee
Mahmoud Mohamed	KBL	1	KDP	Legal, Election & Referendum Committee
Ali Namiq Salihi	KBL	2	Independent	Oil & Mineral Resources Committee
Ibraheem Khalil Rasheed	KBL	1	Kurdistan Islamic Union	Economy & Finance Committee
Silvana Boya Nasir	KBL	1	Assyrian Patriotic Party	Social & Religious Affairs Committee Economy & Finance Committee
Sherzad Adil Khursheed	KBL	2	KDP	Article 58 & The Victims Of Policies & Processes Of Ethnic Cleansing Committee Agriculture & Irrigation Committee
Almas Fadhil Kamal	KBL	1	PUK	Social & Religious Affairs Committee Legal, Election & Referendum Committee
Riyadh Danuk	KBL	1	Independent	Economy & Finance Committee
Jamal Mawlud Bapir	KBL	1	Kurdistan Communist Party	Projects, Reconstruction & Public Services Committee Oil & Mineral Resources Committee
Ali Mahmud Mohamed	KBL	1	Kurdistan Communist Party	Agriculture & Irrigation Committee
Jwan Hassan Zangana	KBL	1	Kurdistan Islamic Union (KIU)	Hiring & DeBaathification Committee Article 58 & The Victims Of Policies & Processes Of Ethnic Cleansing Committee
Layla Mohamed Khidhir	KBL	1	Kurdistan Communist Party	Education & Higher Education Committee
Irfan Jamal Kirkukli	KBL	2	Turkmen People's Party	Security & Public Safety Committee
Sahira Seyfudeen Nuri	KBL	1	Iraqi Turkmen Union Party	Hiring & DeBaathification Committee Legal, Election & Referendum Committee
Jwad Jasim Al-Janabi	KBL	1	Independent	Social & Religious Affairs Committee Education & Higher Education Committee
Nasreen Khalid Whab	KBL	1	KDP	Hiring & DeBaathification Committee Public Affairs Committee
