= Arrapḫa =

Archaeological site in Iraq

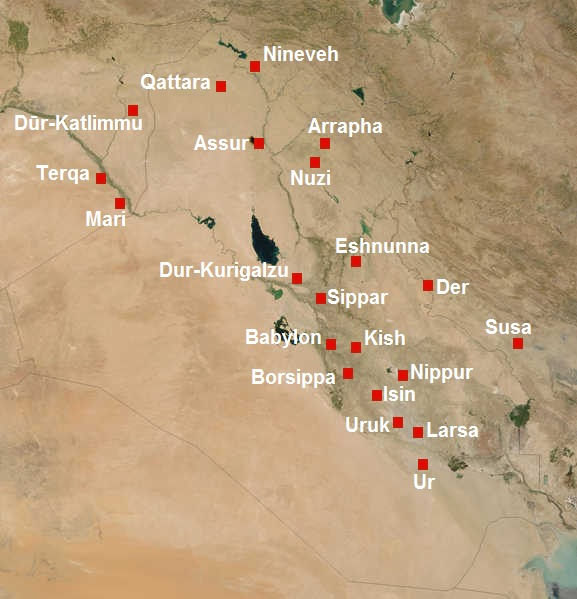
Arrapḫa and other cities of Mesopotamia in the second millennium BC

Arrapḫa (Akkadian: Arrapḫa; Arabic: أررابخا ,عرفة) was an ancient Near Eastern city or kingdom in what today is northeastern Iraq, speculated to be located at city of Kirkuk.

In 1948, Arrapḫa became the name of the residential area in Kirkuk which was built by the North Oil Company as a settlement for its workers.

== History ==
=== Early Bronze Age IV ===
==== Early Bronze IVA - Akkadian period ====
Ancient Arrapḫa was a part of Sargon of Akkad's Akkadian Empire (2334–2154 BC). Later, the city was exposed to the raids of the Lullubi during the reign of Naram-Sin (r. 2255-2218 BC).

==== Early Bronze IVB - Ur III period ====
The first written record of Arrapḫa is attested from the Neo-Sumerian Empire (c. 22nd to 21st century BC).

=== Middle Bronze Age ===
==== Middle Bronze II - Assyrian/Babylonian periods ====
Arrapḫa was an important trading center in the 18th century BC under Assyrian and Babylonian rule.

=== Late Bronze Age ===
==== Mitanni period ====
However, during the 15th and early 14th centuries BC, it was again a largely Hurrian city, the capital of the small Hurrian kingdom of Arrapḫa, situated along the southeastern edge of the area under Mitanni domination. This kingdom was a vassal of Mitanni, which had units of chariots stationed in Arraphian cities such as Lubdu, Arwa and Arn-apuwe.

- Itḫi-Tešup, the king of Arrapḫa (15th century BCE)

==== Assyrian period ====
During the Middle Assyrian Empire (1365–1050 BC), it was fully incorporated into Assyria, after the Assyrian forces had defeated the Hurrian kingdom of Mitanni.

=== Iron Age ===
The city reached great prominence in the 11th and 10th centuries BC as a part of Assyria.

In 615 BC, seeing the Assyrians occupied with the Babylonians and violent rebellions among themselves, the Median king Cyaxares successfully invaded Arrapḫa, which was one of the last strongholds of the Neo-Assyrian Empire.

=== Classical Age ===
The region later became part of the Persian ruled province of Athura (Achaemenid Assyria).

Arrapḫa then fell to the Macedonian Empire, where it became a part of Seleucid Syria in its succeeding Seleucid Empire (Syria being an aphetic form of Assyria). Arrapḫa is mentioned as such until Hellenistic times, at which point the settlement was refounded under the Syriac name Karka (ܟܪܟܐ).

Between the mid 2nd century BC and mid 3rd century AD, during the Parthian Empire and early Sassanid Empire the site was mentioned in Syriac scripts of Christian priest as Beth Garmai, apart from a brief interregnum in the early 2nd century AD when it became a part of the Roman Province of Corduene. The Sassanids conquered the patchwork of independent Assyrian states in the mid to late 3rd century AD, and Arrapḫa was incorporated into Sassanid-ruled Garmekan until the Arab Islamic conquest of the mid 7th century AD, when Assuristan was dissolved and Arrapḫa-Karka eventually became Kirkuk.

Arrapḫa has not been excavated yet, due to its location beneath modern Kirkuk.

== See also ==
- Cities of the ancient Near East

== Sources ==
- Edwards, Iorwerth Eiddon Stephen; Charlesworth, Martin Percival; Boardman, John (1970). The Cambridge Ancient History: Vol. 1, part 2. Cambridge University Press. ISBN 9780521077910.
