= Rebwar Taha =

Iraqi Kurdish politician

- ڕێبوار تەها
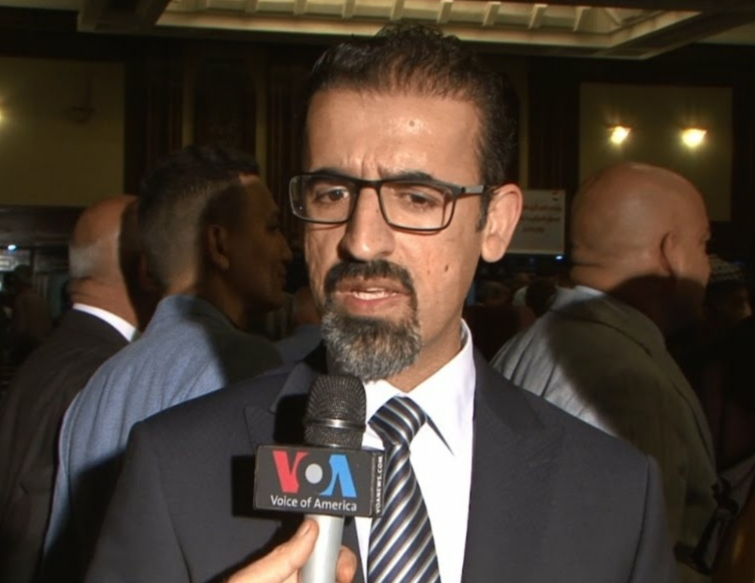
- Rebwar Taha in 2022.

Deputy Governor of Kirkuk Province
- Incumbent
- Assumed office 28 April 2026
- President: Nizar Amidi
- Prime Minister: Ali al-Zaidi; Mohammed Shia' al-Sudani

Governor of Kirkuk Province
- In office 14 August 2024 – April 2026
- Appointed by: Kirkuk Provincial Council
- President: Nizar Amidi; Abdul Latif Rasheed
- Prime Minister: Mohammed Shia' al-Sudani
- Preceded by: Rakan Al-Jabouri (Acting)
- Succeeded by: Mohammed Samaan Agha

Member of the Council of Representatives
- In office 2018–2021
- Parliamentary group: Patriotic Union of Kurdistan
- Constituency: Kirkuk
- In office 2014–2018
- Parliamentary group: Patriotic Union of Kurdistan
- Constituency: Kirkuk

Personal details
- Born: Rebwar Taha Mustafa Ahmed; 1982 azadi neighborhood, Kirkuk, Iraqi Republic
- Party: Patriotic union of kurdistan
- Other political affiliations: Kirkuk is Our Strength and Will Coalition
- Education: Kirkuk Technical Institute
- Occupation: Politician

Rebwar Taha Mustafa (Sorani Kurdish: ڕێبوار تەها موستەفا / Arabic: ريبوار طه مصطفى) (born 1982) is a Kurdish politician who served as the governor of Kirkuk Province of Iraq from 14 August 2024, to April 2026. After his resignation he was elected as Deputy Governor, Taha still serves as deputy Governor of Kirkuk. Formerly he was a representative in the Iraqi council of representatives from 2014 until 2021. Taha is an active member of the Patriotic Union of Kurdistan.

== Early life ==
Taha was born in 1982 in Azadi, Kirkuk.

== Career ==
=== 2014 election ===
in the 2014 Iraqi parliamentary election Taha was a candidate for PUK, the first time he ran for office. He won 5,604 votes and secured a seat in the Council of Representatives of Iraq.

=== 2018 Parliamentary election ===
Taha was the head of list in the PUK's list in Kirkuk. He received 63,231 votes and secured a seat.

=== 2023 Provincial election ===
Taha did not run in the 2021 election. He ran again in 2023. He was the leading candidate for the Kirkuk is our strength and will Coalition. He received 29,861 votes and later became Governor.

=== 2025 Parliamentary election ===
in the parliamentary election Taha was the leading candidate on the (PUK) list. He received 96000 votes, the highest of any candidate including the Prime Minister of Iraq Mohammed Shia' al-Sudani. He decided to remain Governor.

=== Governor and Deputy Governor ===
On 10 August 2024, 9 of the 16 members of the Kirkuk Provincial Council agreed on the administration of Kirkuk Governorate and elected a governor and a council chairman this agreement was referred to as the Hotel Al-Rasheed Agreement. Taha was elected governor for 2 years. On 16 April 2026, during a provincial council session 14 of 16 members were present in which 12 of them voted to accept Taha's resignation as Governor, to become Deputy Governor on 28 April 2026.
