= Humanitarian League Organization =

Islamic organization based in Iraq

Humanitarian League Organization (Kurdish: ڕێکخراوی ڕابیتەی مرۆیی) which formerly known as The Islamic Kurdish League (Kurdish: Rabitay Islamy Kurd), is a Kurdish Sunni Islamic Charity organization, in Iraqi Kurdistan.

== Activities ==
The group's official website reports that their organization established 552 mosques in the Iraqi cities of Dohuk, Erbil, Sulaymaniyah, Kirkuk, Garmian and Mosul from the years of 1992 to 2015. The group also claims to have built 16 schools and established a number of health centres and water projects.

== See also ==
- Kurdistan
