= Nizar Amidi =

President of Iraq since 2026

- نزار آميدي نزار ئامێدی
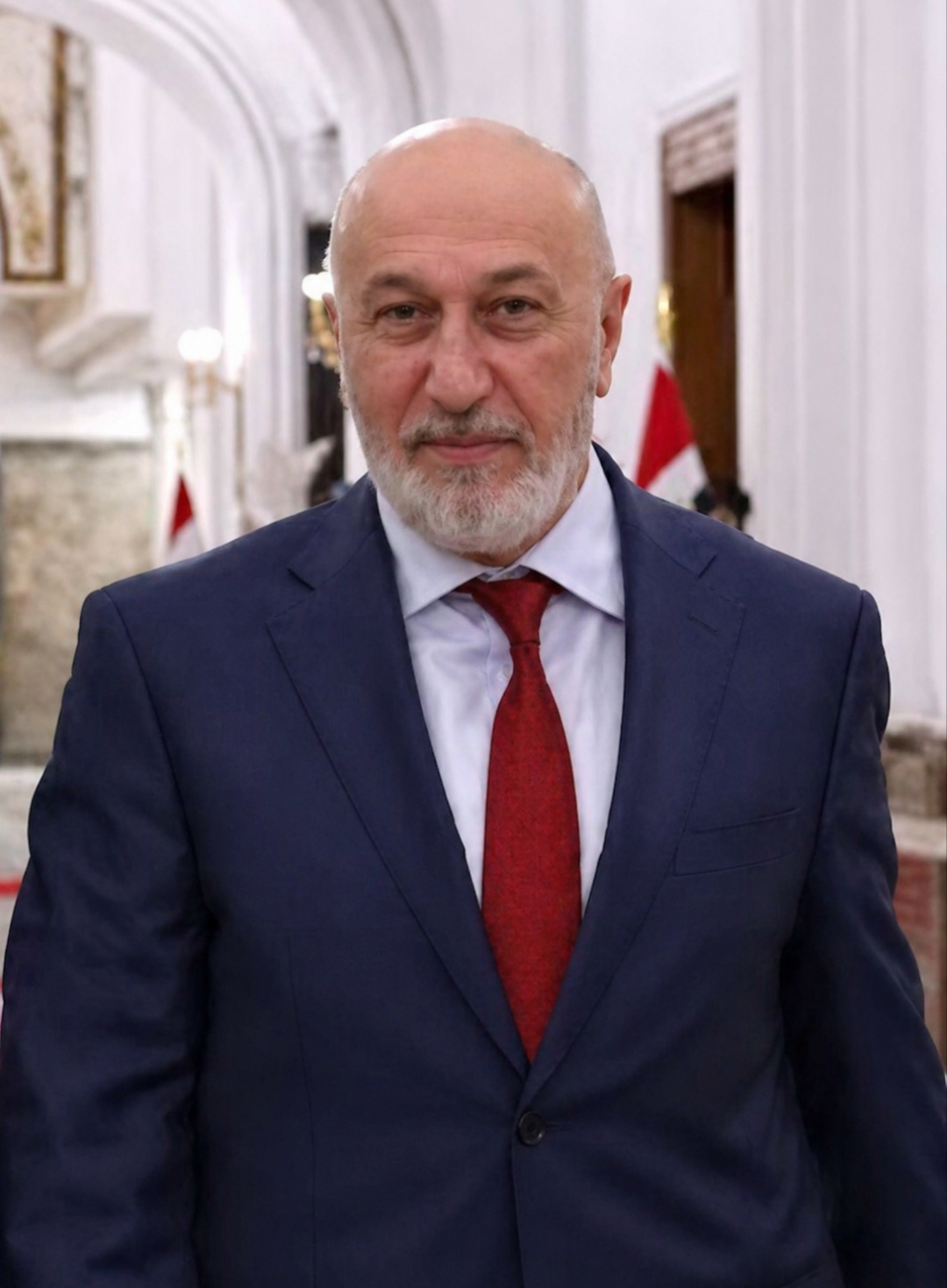
- Amidi in 2026

10th President of Iraq
- Incumbent
- Assumed office 12 April 2026
- Prime Minister: Mohammed Shia al-Sudani; Ali al-Zaidi
- Preceded by: Abdul Latif Rashid

Minister of Environment
- In office 3 December 2022 – 25 October 2024
- Prime Minister: Mohammed Shia al-Sudani
- Preceded by: Jassim Abdul-Aziz al-Falahi
- Succeeded by: Hallo Mustafa Kaka Reza

Personal details
- Born: Nizar Mohammed Saeed Amidi; 8 February 1968 (age 58) Amedi, Mosul Province, Iraq
- Party: Patriotic Union of Kurdistan
- Education: University of Mosul
- Profession: Politician; engineer

Nizar Mohammed Saeed Amidi (Note: Arabic: نزار محمد سعيد آميدي; Kurdish: نزار محەممەد سەعید ئامێدی;) (born 8 February 1968) is an Iraqi engineer and politician who has served as president of Iraq since 2026. A member of the Patriotic Union of Kurdistan (PUK), he previously served as the minister of environment in the government of prime minister Mohammed Shia al-Sudani from 2022 to 2024.

He graduated from the University of Mosul in 1993 with an engineering degree before working as a physics teacher. He has also more than 20 years of experience in governmental and political work and has undertaken executive and advisory roles in Iraqi state institutions. Amidi served as the chief of staff to four previous presidents of Iraq, whose presidencies spanned from 2008 to 2022. He led the Political Bureau of the PUK in Baghdad from 2024.

== Early life and education ==
Amidi was born on 6 February 1968, in the district of Amedi in Mosul Province, now in the Duhok Governorate. He relocated to Mosul for higher education and received his bachelor's degree in mechanical engineering from the University of Mosul in 1993. He subsequently worked as a physics teacher during the 1990s, and lived and worked in both Sulaymaniyah and Baghdad.

== Political career ==
Amidi has been a member of the Patriotic Union of Kurdistan (PUK) since the 1990s. He has held multiple governmental and political positions in the new Iraqi federal state, such as serving as a liaison between the Federal Government of Iraq and the Kurdistan Regional Government. Amidi was the personal secretary of Jalal Talabani from 2005 to 2008, and then as his chief of staff, the Director of the Office of the President of the Republic, during Talabani's presidency from 2008 to 2014. Amidi was then chief of staff for the presidencies of Fuad Masum, from 2014 to 2018; Barham Salih, from 2018 to 2022; and briefly during the term of Abdul Latif Rashid in 2022.

=== Environment ministry ===
Amidi served as the Iraqi Minister of Environment in the government of Mohammed Shia' al-Sudani starting from 3 December 2022, until his resignation on 25 October 2024 to focus on political work. He then became the head of the PUK Political Bureau in Baghdad, managing the party's work in the capital.

On 18 September 2024, Amidi announced the "National Strategy for the Protection and Improvement of the Environment in Iraq (2024–2030)," in a collaboration between the Iraqi environment ministry, the United Nations Development Program, and USAID. The program aims to address Iraq's most pressing environmental challenges.

=== Presidency ===
==== Election ====
Under the informal muhasasah power-sharing agreement adopted by the ruling elite in Iraq since 2003, the prime minister must be a Shia Muslim, the parliamentary speaker a Sunni Muslim, and the president, largely a ceremonial office, must be a Kurd. In contrast to previous agreements between the two ruling Kurdish parties (KDP and PUK) wherein it would be so that the federal presidency be held by the latter and the presidency of Kurdistan Region by the former, KDP nonetheless nominated Fuad Hussein for the 2026 Iraqi presidential election, challenging Amedi for the office. Because of the dispute, the December 2025 and February 2026 sessions of parliament postponed the presidential vote. This prevented the appointment of a new prime minister for five months following the November 2025 parliamentary election, because the prime minister is nominated by the president.

On 11 April 2026, Amidi was elected president of Iraq by the Council of Representatives in the second round of voting, with 227 votes to 15 votes for his opponent, Muthanna Amin of the Kurdistan Islamic Union. Amidi led the first round with 208 votes, but was short of 220, the two-thirds majority required by the constitution. KDP later announced that it does not recognize Nizar Amedi as representing the Kurdish majority and will not engage with him. After being elected, Amidi said he will govern on the basis of "Iraq First" principles, condemning attacks on the territory of Iraq during the Israeli–U.S. war with Iran and supporting peace efforts.

== Personal life ==
Amidi is married and has four children.

== Notes ==
Political offices
| Preceded by Abdul Latif Rashid | President of Iraq; 2026–present | Incumbent |
| Preceded by Jassim Abdul Aziz al-Falahi | Minister of Environment of Iraq; 2022–2024 | Succeeded by Hallo Mustafa Kaka Reza |
