= Kirkuk Governorate =

Governorate of Iraq

Kirkuk Governorate محافظة كركوك (Arabic)
- Governorate

Name transcription(s)
  - Arabic: محافظة كركوك (Muḥāfaẓat Karkūk)
  - Kurdish: پارێزگای کەرکووک (Parêzgayi Kerkûk)
  - Turkish: Kerkük Valiliği
  - Syriac: ܗܘܦܪܟܝܐ ܕܟܪܟܘܟ (hēwparkīyā dKarkūk)
- Coordinates: 35°22′N 44°8′E
- Country: Iraq (Disputed territories of Northern Iraq)
- Capital: Kirkuk

Government
  - Type: Provincial government
  - Body: Kirkuk Provincial Council
  - Governor: Qahtan Wandawi
  - Deputy Governor: Rebwar Taha

Area
  - Total: 9,679 km^{2} (3,737 sq mi)

Population (2024 census)
  - Total: 2,034,627
  - Density: 210.2/km^{2} (544.4/sq mi)
- ISO 3166 code: IQ-KI
- Official language(s): Arabic, Kurdish, Syriac and Turkish
- HDI (2024): 0.738 high · 2nd of 18
- Website: kirkuk.gov.iq

Kirkuk Governorate (Note: (Arabic: محافظة كركوك, romanized: Muḥāfaẓat Karkūk; Kurdish: پارێزگای کەرکووک, romanized: Parêzgeha Kerkûkê/Parêzgayi Kerkûk; Turkish: Kerkük Valiliği)) or Kirkuk Province is a governorate in northern Iraq. The governorate has an area of 9,679 square kilometres (3,737 sq mi). In 2024, the population was 2,034,627 people. The provincial capital is the city of Kirkuk. It is divided into four districts.

The province was named Kirkuk Governorate until 1976, when it was named At-Ta'mim Governorate, meaning "nationalization", referring to the national ownership of the regional oil and natural gas reserves. While Article 140 of the 2005 Constitution mandated the restoration of the name "Kirkuk Governorate" by 2007, the administrative transition was delayed by political disputes. The name was not fully reinstated across all federal records and identity documents until 2017.

== Governorate government ==
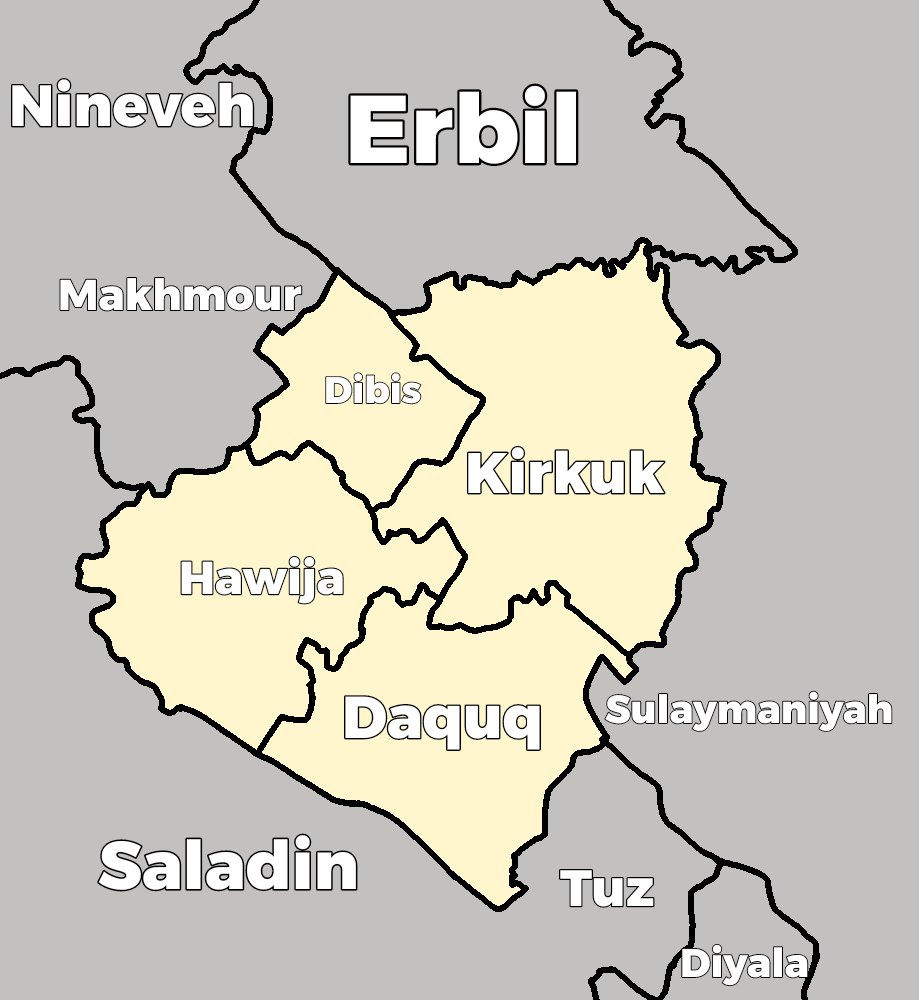
Districts of Kirkuk Governorate

- Governor: Mohammed Samaan Agha (Iraqi Turkmen Front)

== Districts ==
District	Total population, 2024
Kirkuk	1,549,454
Dibis	78,101
Daquq	85,773
Hawija	321,299

== Demographics ==
Kirkuk Governorate borders were altered in 1976; when 4 districts were added to the Sulaymaniya, Diyala and Saladin Governorates. The Kirkuk Governorate received the Arab populated Zab District from the Mosul Governorate.

With the Arabization policies of the Ba'ath party, the number of Arabs in official censuses increased fivefold within 40 years, however the most reliable data indicative of the ethnic breakdown of the governorate are those of the 1957 census. The number of Kurds remained relatively constant from 1957 until 1977, decrease in their numbers coincides with the Arabization process in the 1990s. The Turkmens were seriously affected by the Ba'ath changing Kirkuk borders their percentage fell from 21% to 7%.

Starting from 1977, 2,000 Christians (Assyrians) were registered as Arabs. From the end of the Gulf War to 1999, about 11,000 Kurdish families were deported from Kirkuk. Since the 2003 U.S. invasion of Iraq, 100,000 Kurds have returned to the city of Kirkuk.

=== Statistics ===
Ethnic data from a League of Nations report from 1925 and British data from 1924, 1930 and 1931 (the province had different borders during these years):

Ethnic data for Kirkuk Governorate (liwa)
Ethnicity	1924	%	1925	%	1930	%	1931	%
Kurdish	79,646	54.4%	47,500	42.5%	67,703	49.5%	77,608	56.7%
Turkmen/Turk	28,395	19.3%	26,100	23.4%	28,741	21%	28,741	21%
Arab	35,649	24.4%	35,650	31.9%	26,561	19.4%	26,561	19.4%
Jewish	1,703	1.2%	-		6,742	4.9%	2,472	1.8%
Christian	1,000	0.7%	2,400	2.1%	1,228	0.9%	1,228	0.9%
Other			-		-		192	0.1%
Total	146,393		111,650		136,705		136,802	

Census results for Kirkuk Governorate
Mother tongue	1947 (Ethnicity)	Percentage	1957	Percentage	1977	Percentage	1997	Percentage
Arabic			109,620	28%	218,755	45%	544,596	72%
Kurdish	151,575	53%	187,593	48%	184,875	38%	155,861	21%
Turkish			83,371	21%	80,347	17%	50,099	7%
Syriac			1,605	0.4%	N/A	N/A	N/A	N/A
Hebrew	4,042	1.05%	123	0.003%	N/A	N/A	N/A	N/A
Other			6,545	1.77%	N/A	N/A	N/A	N/A
Total	285,900		388,829		483,977		752,745	

A report by the International Crisis Group points out that figures from 1977 and 1997 censuses "are all considered highly problematic, due to suspicions of regime manipulation" because Iraqi citizens were only allowed to indicate belonging to either the Arab or Kurdish ethnic groups; consequently, this skewed the number of other ethnic minorities, such as Iraq's third largest ethnic group – the Turkmen.

== 2018 election results ==
The following is the results of the 2018 Iraqi parliamentary election in the Kirkuk governorate. Election results are often used to estimate the demographics of the region. However, Iraqi citizens do not necessary vote for parties based on its ethnic affiliation.

Party	Total vote	Percentage	Seats
Patriotic Union of Kurdistan	183,283	37.8%	6
Arab Alliance of Kirkuk	84,102	17.4%	3
Turkman Front of Kirkuk	79,694	16.4%	3
Victory Coalition	24,328	5%	0
Conquest Alliance	18,427	3.8%	0
National Coalition	14,979	3.1%	0
Nishtiman coalition _{Movement for Change; Coalition for Democracy and Justice; Kurdistan Islamic Group}	14,118	2.9%	0
New Generation Movement	13,096	2.7%	0
Chaldean Coalition; Reserved Christian Seat	4,864	1%	1
Kurdistan Islamic Group	4,631	1%	0
Chaldean Syriac Assyrian Popular Council	3,810	0.8%	0
Others	39,286	8.1%	0
Total	484,618	100%	12(+1)

== Archeological sites ==
Archeological sites in the governorate include Arrapḫa, Nuzi and Lubdu, which all date back several thousand years. Arrapḫa is located within the modern city of Kirkuk, Nuzi is identified with the site of Yorghan Tepe and the location of Lubdu isn't certain, but considered to be at Tall Buldagh.

== See also ==
- 2009 Kirkuk governorate election
- Arabization
- Kurdification
- Article 140 of the Constitution of Iraq
