= Kurdistan Islamic Union =

Kurdistan Islamic Union یەکگرتووی ئیسلامیی کوردستان Yekgirtûy Islamîy Kurdistan
- Leader: Salahaddin Bahaaddin
- Founded: 1994
- Headquarters: Erbil
- Ideology: Islamism; Social conservatism
- Political position: Right-wing
- International affiliation: Muslim Brotherhood
- Colors: Brown
- Seats in the Council of Representatives of Iraq: 4 / 329
- Seats in the Kurdistan Region Parliament: 7 / 100

Party flag
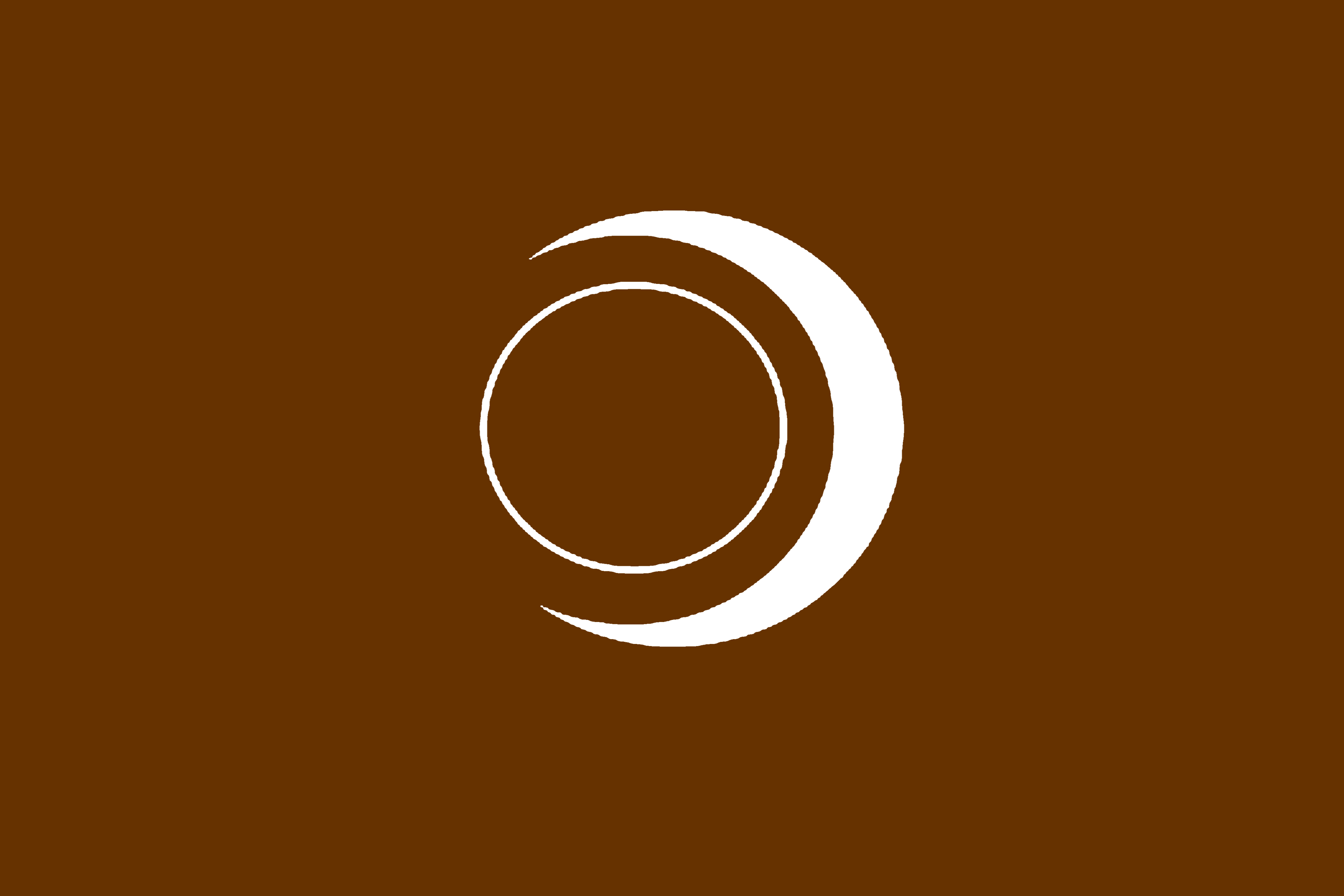

Website
- www.yakgrtw.net

The Kurdistan Islamic Union (Kurdish: یەکگرتووی ئیسلامیی کوردستان; Yekgirtiya Îslamî ya Kurdistanê), colloquially referred to as Yekgirtû, is a Kurdish Islamist party in Kurdistan Region.

== Leadership and supporters ==
Salahaddin Bahaaddin cofounded the Kurdistan Islamic Union on February 6, 1994. In the first General Conference he was elected as the Secretary General of the party. Later, in the second, the third, and the fourth Conferences he was also elected as the Secretary General. Later succeeded by Hadi Ali, and Mohammed Faraj, in 2016 he was again elected Secretary-General.

KIU professes non-violence, and supports the Islamic Kurdish League, which provides services to the poor. It is also represented on the Iraqi Governing Council.

The party is chiefly active among students (reportedly winning nearly 40% of the vote in Duhok University student elections), but also has a base of adult political supporters, particularly in the city of Erbil. It also enjoys good relations with both the Patriotic Union of Kurdistan and the Kurdistan Democratic Party.

== 2005 elections ==
In the January 2005 Iraqi parliamentary election, the Kurdistan Islamic Union was part of a broad coalition of Kurdish parties, the Democratic Patriotic Alliance of Kurdistan. However, in November 2005, the KIU withdrew from this coalition and announced that it would run separately from the other major Kurdish groups in the December 2005 Iraqi legislative election. Running independently on an agenda of "reform and services", the KIU declared that pluralism in Kurdistan is not practiced, and that voters should vote for the political party of their choice

In response to the KIU pulling out from the Democratic Patriotic Alliance of Kurdistan, the Kurdistan Islamic Union office was the target of riots and protest by 3,000–5,000 people, mainly members of Kurdistan Democratic Party organizations. During the protest, the phrase "Long Live 730" was written on the office's walls. 730 is the "numerical ballot designation for the political alliance led by Iraq's two largest Kurdish parties, the Kurdistan Democratic Party (KDP) and the Patriotic Union of Kurdistan."

The riots resulted in the deaths of 4 members of KIU, including one member of the KIU leadership, after their offices in Duhok, Zakho and several other areas were exposed to gunfire after police and security forces supported the protesters instead of protecting KIU offices.

In the December 2005 elections, the party won 1.3% of the vote and 5 out of 275 seats.

== December 2011 violence ==
On December 2, 2011, after Friday prayers, unknown persons rampaged through the city of Zakho attacking liquor stores, beauty salons, a Chinese massage parlor, and several hotels. The sale of alcohol in Iraq is often the preserve of Christians and Yezidis, who were disproportionate victims of the arson attacks. The violence quickly spread throughout the Bahdinan area of Iraqi Kurdistan, to nearby Dohuk, and eventually as far as way as the south-eastern city of Sulaymaniyah. At least 30 people were injured. Government spokesmen for the Kurdistan Democratic Party blamed the violence on a cleric associated with the Kurdistan Islamic Union. But the KIU and the cleric himself refuted these allegations. The KIU has a strong support base in the region - although not as strong as the KDP. Subsequent to the attacks, KDP supporters set fire to more than four KIU political and media offices throughout the f area of Kurdistan Region.

== Election results ==
=== Iraq ===
Parliamentary election

Election	Leader	Votes	%	Seats	+/–	Position	Government
Dec 2005	Salahaddin Bahaaddin	157,688	1.29%	5 / 275	New	▲6th	Opposition
2010	Salahaddin Bahaaddin	243,720	2.11%	4 / 325	▼1	▼8th	Coalition
2014	Mohammad Faraj Ahmad Aziz	165,856	1.27%	4 / 328	0	▼13th	Opposition
2018	Salahaddin Bahaaddin	104,257	1.00%	2 / 329	▼2	▼16th	Opposition
2021	Salahaddin Bahaaddin	In Kurdistani Coalition		0 / 329	▼2	—N/a	Extra-parliamentary
2025	Salahaddin Bahaaddin	166,954	1.49%	4 / 329	▲4	▼18th	TBA

== See also ==
- List of Islamic political parties
- Salahaddin Bahaaddin
