= Iraqi Turkmen Front =

Iraqi political party

Iraqi Turkmen Front Irak Türkmen Cephesi الجبهة التركمانية العراقية al-Jabha al-Turkmaniya al-Iraqiya
- Abbreviation: ITF
- President: Mehmet Seman Ağaoğlu
- Honorary Leader: Saadeddin Arkej
- Deputy President: Hasan Turan
- Founded: 24 April 1995
- Headquarters: Kirkuk
- Ideology: Regionalism; Turkmen interests
- Political position: Right-wing
- Colours: Blue
- Council of Representatives: 1 / 328
- Kurdistan Region Parliament: 0 / 100
- Governors of the governorates of Iraq: 1 / 19

Party flag

The Iraqi Turkmen Front (Arabic: الجبهة التركمانية العراقية, romanized: al-Jabha al-Turkmāniya al-Irāqiya, Turkish: Irak Türkmen Cephesi), abbreviated as ITF, is a political movement representing the Iraqi Turkmen people. It was founded on April 5, 1995 as a coalition of several Turkmen parties operating within the framework of Iraq's unity. The party aims for the Turkmen community to have greater political involvement, increased recognition and more rights.

Since the fall of Saddam Hussein, the party has contested control of Kirkuk and other areas of northern Iraq, claiming that Kirkuk belongs to the Turkmen people. The ITF claims a region named Turkmeneli (literally meaning the "land of the Turkmens") as the homeland of the Iraqi Turkmen. Turkmeneli includes within its boundaries Kirkuk, Tal Afar, Erbil, Mandali, Mosul and Tuz Khurmatu. The Iraqi Army and Peshmerga have not allowed them to form their militia and take control of the areas where they live.

The party played an active role in the fight against the Islamic State to defend the region of Turkmeneli (especially around Kirkuk) and the Iraqi Turkmen population from the genocide that ISIS committed against Iraqi Turkmen.

== Composition ==
The Iraqi Turkmen Front is a coalition of the following political parties:

- Iraqi National Turkmen Party (INTP), founded in 1988 and which operated in the northern Iraqi no-fly zones
- Turkmeneli Party, founded in 1992 in Northern Cyprus as the Turkmen Union Party
- Provincial Turkmen Party
- Movement of the Independent Turkmen
- Iraqi Turkmen Rights Party
- Turkmen Islamic Movement of Iraq

== Election results ==
In the December 2005 Iraqi legislative election, the ITF list (#630) polled 76,434 votes, or 0.7% nationwide, according to the uncertified published results. The overwhelming majority of those votes were cast in Kirkuk Governorate, where the ITF won more than 10% of the total. Most of the rest of the ITF's votes were in Saladin Governorate. According to the full official results of that election, the ITF is entitled to only one seat in the permanent National Assembly. The party has been funded deeply by the Turkish administration and military.

In the aftermath of the first Iraqi parliamentary election in 2005, the ITF lodged a number of formal complaints to the Independent Electoral Commission of Iraq alleging vote fraud on the part of the Kurdish parties and protesting the Commission's decision to allow Kurdish internally displaced persons and refugees to vote in the places from which they had been expelled under Saddam Hussein. In the election, they received 93,480 votes, or 1.11% of votes cast, earning them three seats in the transitional National Assembly of Iraq.

In the 2009 Kurdistan Region parliamentary election, many Turkmen boycotted the elections. The ITF polled just 7,077 votes, or 0.38% of the popular vote, winning 1 seat.

In the 2010 Iraqi national elections, the ITF has entered into an alliance with the Iraqi National Movement (Iraqiya) in the Governorate of Kirkuk. Iyad Allawi's Iraqiya List which the ITF candidates have taken part in, has won the elections in the governorate over the list of Patriotic Union of Kurdistan in total votes. The ITF candidate in the Turkmen stronghold of Kirkuk, Arshad Salihi, won 59,732 votes all by himself. This was second only to Khalid Shwani of the Patriotic Union of Kurdistan, who won 68,522 votes.

The other candidates of ITF who have entered the parliament from ITF lists and different lists were as following, Arshad Salihi (Kirkuk), Jale Çiftçi (Kirkuk), İzzettin Devle (Mosul) who was appointed as the Minister of Agriculture, Nebil Harbo (Mosul), Müdrike Ahmet (Mosul) and Hasan Özmen (Diyala) and 4 more including Turhan Müftü who was appointed as the Minister of the Governorates. The ITF has won a total of 127,989 votes in general in Iraq, increasing their total vote cast by 34,600.

ITF has decided to enter the latest Kurdish Elections which took place in late 2013, too. ITF has made up one list and got the highest vote in Erbil making Aydın Maruf the ITF Turkmen member of parliament from Erbil in KRG Parliament.

In the Iraqi parliamentary election in 2014, the ITF has protected its total parliament member count of 10 and protecting the number of their directly elected number of candidates from ITF-Turkmen lists (without alliances) but also increasing the total number of ITF parliamenters to 3, as a result of the victory of the ITF member who participated in Muttahidun Lil'Islah List, Hena Asğar, in Tuz Khurmatu, a major Turkmen settlement located in the Tooz District of Governorate of Saladin. ITF tried hard to make all Turkmens cast their votes but they couldn't change the situation a lot, when compared to the previous elections and the ISIL advance in Iraq was shown as the main reason for this. The movement's leader Arahad Salihi (Kirkuk) and deputy Hasan Turan (Kirkuk) has been elected as members of parliament from ITF's own list; Kirkuk Turkmen Front List, headed by party's deputy Hasan Turan. ITF's, Kirkuk Turkmen Front List was the second in the Governorate of Kirkuk, winning 71,492 votes, nearly 13% of the total votes in Kirkuk Governorate. Although there was a second Turkmen list named Kirkuk Turkmen Alliance, participating in elections in Kirkuk; the votes of ITF in Kirkuk have increased about 3,000 when compared to the received votes of ITF candidates in the 2010 elections. The total vote received by Turkmen lists, nevertheless it was almost fully received by the ITF's Turkmen List, have increased too. There were 7 other non-ITF Turkmen candidates who were elected to the parliament from various lists. The biggest surprise was the 3 Turkmens getting elected in Saladin Governorate, including the first ITF parliament member of Tuz Khurmatu, from a non-ITF list, Hena Asğar.

On the 16th of April 2026, leader of the Iraqi Turkmen Front Mohammed Samaan Agha was elected by the Kirkuk Provincial Council and appointed on as governor of Kirkuk Governorate by the president of Iraq. The previous governor from August 2024, Rebwar Taha of the Patriotic Union of Kurdistan or PUK, became deputy as well. This is meant to comply with a power-sharing agreement in 2024 between Arabs, Kurdish, and Turkmen ethnicities.

== Training by the Turkish Special Forces Command ==
In March 2015, exiled governor of Mosul, Atheel al-Nujaifi, revealed that Turkish Special Forces known as the "Maroon Berets" are training both Iraqi and Syrian Turkmens in a training mission targeted at recapturing ISIL's Mosul stronghold. Nujaifi also said that Turkish authorities had promised to send weapons. Turkish officials later confirmed training camps in Erbil, Mosul and Kirkuk as well as at unrevealed locations inside Syria. They said the training focussed on street clashes, sabotage and intelligence gathering.

On the same day, Iraqi Turkmen Front MP Aydın Maruf declared that an official Turkmen Brigade of the Iraqi army would be created in the near future, starting with 500 men and then growing up to 1500 shortly thereafter for the defense of Tal Afar, Kifri and other major Turkmen settlements from ISIL and also for the planned offense to retake the areas which were under ISIL control, like Mosul. He also stated that the brigade from now on would receive official support by the Turkish Armed Forces and that an Iraqi Turkmen commander would be in charge of the brigade in the ongoing fight. This official agreement between ITF, the Iraqi Government and the KRG will be guaranteed officially by the Republic of Turkey. Maruf considered this an important step for the future of Iraqi Turkmens. There are 4,000 Turkmen fighters battling Daesh in the northern province of Kirkuk and 10,000 others have finished their training in Mosul.

== See also ==
- List of armed groups in the Iraqi Civil War
- Erbil massacre
