= Deputy Prime Minister of the Kurdistan Region =

Deputy head of government of Iraqi Kurdistan

- جێگری سەرۆکی وەزیرانی هەرێمی کوردستان
- Coat of arms of the Kurdistan Region

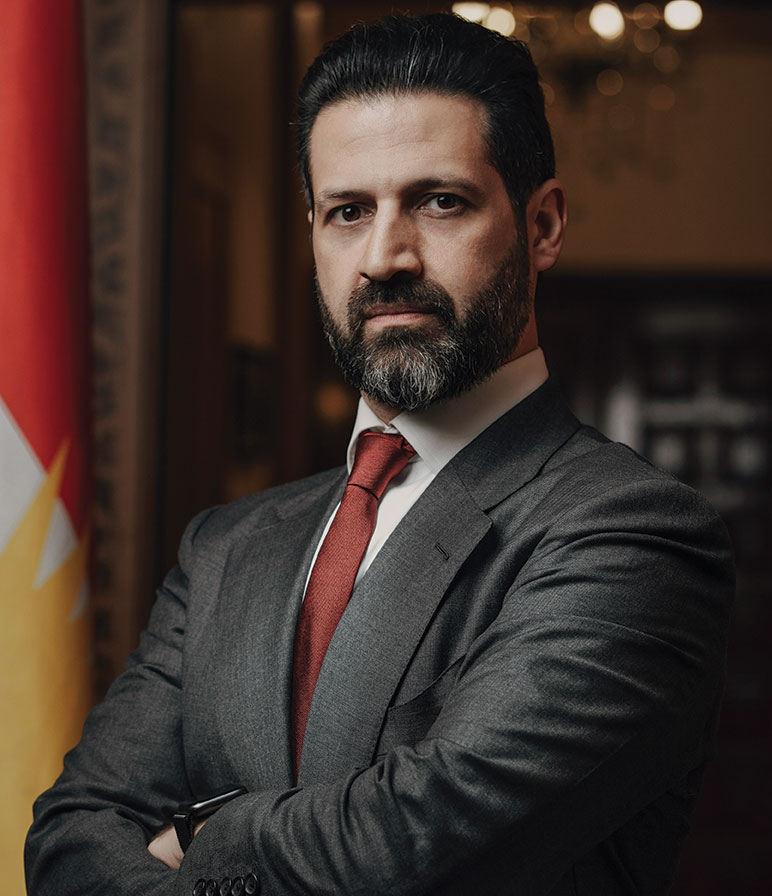
- Incumbent; Qubad Talabani since 18 June 2014
- Status: Deputy head of government
- Member of: Kurdistan Regional Government
- Seat: Erbil, Kurdistan Region, Iraq
- Nominator: Prime Minister
- Appointer: Kurdistan Parliament
- Term length: Four years
- Constituting instrument: Law No. 1 (1992)
- Formation: 1996
- First holder: Nechirvan Barzani
- Website: KRG Deputy Prime Minister

The Deputy Prime Minister of the Kurdistan Region (Kurdish: جێگری سەرۆکی وەزیرانی هەرێمی کوردستان) is the deputy head of the government of the Kurdistan Region of Iraq. The deputy prime minister assists the prime minister in overseeing the work of the Kurdistan Regional Government (KRG), coordinates inter-ministerial affairs, and may act on behalf of the Prime Minister in their absence. The position is appointed by the Kurdistan Parliament as part of the KRG cabinet formation process.

The office was first established in 1996 with the formation of the third cabinet of the KDP-controlled administration. The first deputy prime minister was Nechirvan Barzani, who served from 1996 until his appointment as prime minister in 1999.

The current Deputy Prime Minister is Qubad Talabani of the Patriotic Union of Kurdistan (PUK), who was first sworn in on 18 June 2014 as part of the eighth KRG cabinet. He was re-appointed to the ninth cabinet on 10 July 2019. Talabani is also the head of the PUK's negotiating delegation for forming the next KRG government.

Prior to his role as deputy prime minister, Talabani served as the KRG Representative to the United States from 2006 to 2012, where he was instrumental in forming the United States Kurdistan Business Council and launching the Kurdish American Congressional Caucus.

== List of deputy prime ministers ==
=== 1992-2005 ===
After the 1992 Kurdistan elections, the PDK and PUK soon started a civil war, which lasted for many years. This resulted in a KDP-controlled government and a PUK-controlled government being established.

==== PUK-controlled part ====
Deputy Prime Ministers of the PUK-controlled Kurdistan Regional Government:

No.	Portrait	Name (Birth–Death)	Took office	Left office	Political party
1		Adnan Mufti (born 1949)	1999	4 June 2005	Patriotic Union of Kurdistan

==== KDP-controlled part ====
Deputy Prime Ministers of the KDP-controlled Kurdistan Regional Government:

No.	Portrait	Name (Birth–Death)	Took office	Left office	Political party
1		Nechirvan Barzani (born 1966)	16 September 1996	20 December 1999	Kurdistan Democratic Party
2		Fazel Mirani (Note: Fazel Mirani served concurrently with Nechirvan Barzani as Deputy Prime Minister in the third cabinet of the KDP-controlled administration. The KDP zone had multiple Deputy Prime Ministers serving simultaneously.) (born 1948)	1997	1999	Kurdistan Democratic Party
3		Sami Abdul Rahman (1932 – 1 February 2004)	1999	1 February 2004 (assassinated)	Kurdistan Democratic Party

=== 2006–present (Unified Government) ===
After the reconciliation between the KDP and PUK, a parliamentary election was held on 30 January 2005, and a unified Kurdistan Regional Government was formed. The position of Deputy Prime Minister continued as part of the unified cabinet structure.

Deputy Prime Ministers of the Kurdistan Regional Government (Unified):

No.	Portrait	Name (Birth–Death)	Took office	Left office	Political party	Prime Minister
1	—	Omer Fattah Hussain (born 1948)	1 March 2006	24 February 2009	Patriotic Union of Kurdistan	Nechirvan Barzani
2	—	Imad Ahmad Sayfour (born 1955)	6 April 2009	27 October 2009	Patriotic Union of Kurdistan	Nechirvan Barzani
3	—	Azad Barwari (born 1946)	27 October 2009	2012	Kurdistan Democratic Party	Barham Salih
4		Qubad Talabani (born 1977)	18 June 2014	present	Patriotic Union of Kurdistan	Nechirvan Barzani (2014–2019); Masrour Barzani (2019–present)

== See also ==
- Kurdistan Regional Government
- Kurdistan Region Parliament
- President of the Kurdistan Region
- Prime Minister of the Kurdistan Region
- Speaker of Kurdistan Parliament
