= Ministry of Health (Kurdistan Region) =

Kurdistan Region ministry

- وەزارەتی تەندروستی; Wezaretî Tendirûstî
- Emblem of the Kurdistan Region

- Emblem of the Ministry of Health

Ministry overview
- Formed: Early 1991
- Jurisdiction: Kurdistan Region
- Headquarters: Aras Street, Jahid Junction, Erbil, Kurdistan Region, Iraq
- Ministry executive: Saman Barzanji, Minister of Health
- Website: gov.krd/moh-en/

The Ministry of Health of the Kurdistan Region (Kurdish: وەزارەتی تەندروستی, romanized: Wezaretî Tendirûstî) is the governmental body of the Kurdistan Regional Government (KRG) responsible for overseeing healthcare provision in the Kurdistan Region and for the ongoing development of medical and scientific capacity within the region. Headquartered on Aras Street in Erbil, it administers a network of public hospitals, primary health care centers, and specialized facilities across the region's four governorates of Erbil, Sulaymaniyah, Duhok, and Halabja. The ministry is accountable to the Kurdistan Parliament and funded through the Kurdistan Regional Treasury.

== History ==
=== Establishment and early years ===
Iraq's health system operated without a dedicated ministry of health until 1950, when one was established on a capital-intensive hospital model. After the Kurdistan Region slipped out of Baghdad's direct control following the 1991 uprising and the establishment of a no-fly zone under United Nations auspices, the Kurdistan Regional Government began constructing its own administrative institutions. The Ministry of Health was founded in the early 1990s, modelled on the organizational structure of the federal Iraqi Ministry of Health, with public-sector services centrally administered from Erbil.

From 1992 to 2003 the ministry operated under severe fiscal constraints; its budget was sufficient only to cover staff salaries, leaving no resources for building or renovating hospitals and health facilities. After the fall of Saddam Hussein's government in 2003, federal budget transfers to the region commenced, though these covered only around 40 percent of assessed health needs. A 2004 Iraqi Ministry of Health report acknowledged that decades of neglect under the former government had driven health indicators to levels comparable to some of the least developed countries. Health expenditure improved between 2008 and 2011 as the KRG directed greater resources toward regional development; during that period 35 new primary health care facilities and nine new hospitals were constructed.

=== Displacement crisis and conflict ===
The onset of the Syrian Civil War and the subsequent advance of the Islamic State in 2014 placed severe additional strain on the health system. Between 2012 and 2014, the influx of internally displaced persons (IDPs) and Syrian refugees deprived host communities of health spending and stretched service capacity. By 2014 the ministry was reporting critical medicine shortages and requested emergency support from the World Health Organization. A 2015 World Bank Economic and Social Impact Assessment concluded that an additional $317 million would be required to restore stability to the health sector given the increased demand.

=== Reform initiatives from 2010 ===
In 2010, the KRG invited the RAND Corporation to help guide health system reform. Working with both the Ministry of Health and the Ministry of Planning, RAND conducted successive phases of research through 2015 covering the development of a primary care management information system, health financing reform—including the problem of physician dual practice, in which public-sector doctors also worked in private clinics—and hospital patient safety training.

From 2015, the University of Rome Tor Vergata, in partnership with the ministry and with financial support from the Italian Ministry of Foreign Affairs, developed an electronic health monitoring and epidemiological surveillance system for the region. The platform used the DHIS2 open-source software and ICD-10 coding standards, linking hospitals and primary health centers across all four governorates to a central node at the ministry. By September 2019, 59 facilities had been enrolled in the system.

In July 2024 the ministry announced a further initiative to create a unified digital health database covering the entire region, developed in cooperation with an Italian university partner and following a recommendation by Prime Minister Masrour Barzani to link government ministries and agencies digitally.

== Organization ==
=== Structure ===
The ministry is headed by the Minister of Health, a cabinet-level position within the KRG. The minister is accountable to the Kurdistan Parliament. Day-to-day policy implementation rests with the ministry in Erbil, while long-term health planning is a shared responsibility with the Ministry of Planning. The Ministry of Finance approves annual budget allocations for health services, and all ministry employees are salaried civil servants under civil service guidelines.

Below the central ministry, four general health directorates—corresponding to the governorates of Erbil, Duhok, Sulaymaniyah, and Halabja—serve as the operational implementing bodies, managing local hospitals, primary health centers, and sub-centers.

=== Kurdistan Medical Control Agency ===
The Kurdistan Medical Control Agency (KMCA), operating under the ministry's Directorate of Pharmaceutical Products Quality Control, is responsible for registering pharmaceutical manufacturers and medicinal products in the Kurdistan Region. Its processes run parallel to federal Iraqi registration: manufacturers already registered with the Iraqi Ministry of Health must register separately with the KMCA to operate in the region, and the agency evaluates imported pharmaceutical batches for quality control. The KMCA also issues licences for the import of medical devices into the region from outside Iraq.

== Healthcare system ==
=== Facilities and workforce ===
According to statistics published by the ministry in 2023, the Kurdistan Region has 135 hospitals—83 public and 52 private—and 1,470 health centers. Of the health centers, 16 percent are in cities, 32 percent in districts, 11 percent in sub-districts, and 41 percent in villages. Total hospital beds exceed 11,000, of which more than 8,000 are in the public sector and approximately 3,000 in the private sector. The medical workforce at that time consisted of nearly 8,000 doctors—approximately 1,500 of them dentists—and more than 22,000 nurses. In 2022, over 232,000 surgical procedures were performed in the region's hospitals.

=== Financing ===
Public health care in the Kurdistan Region is provided free of charge to patients, with facilities receiving budget allocations from the Ministry of Finance and staff paid as civil servants. The private sector accounts for an estimated 20 to 30 percent of total health care spending, a share driven in part by physician dual practice. RAND research identified the absence of any link between pay and performance as a structural weakness and recommended a phased transition toward an accountable national health service model and, eventually, social health insurance. The ministry's budget has historically been around 2.5 percent of total KRG public expenditure, comparable to the share allocated in the rest of Iraq.

=== Primary care ===
The public health delivery system is organized into two tiers: the hospital sector and a primary care network built around primary health centers (PHCs). RAND's survey of the network in 2013–2014 found 605 centers across the then-three governorates, roughly one-third main PHCs and two-thirds sub-centers. Main PHCs tended to serve more than 10,000 people each—above WHO-recommended thresholds—while most sub-centers served fewer than 2,000 people. Staffing was uneven: almost all main PHCs in Duhok had at least one physician, whereas fewer than 20 percent of sub-centers across the region did.

=== Relations with the federal government ===
Relations between the regional ministry in Erbil and the federal Ministry of Health in Baghdad have at times been characterized by disputes over budget transfers and drug supply allocations. Research published in BMC International Health and Human Rights described a pattern in which Baghdad determined both the volume and content of resources sent to Kurdistan independently of actual needs. Despite institutional friction, formal coordination has continued; in January 2024, Minister Barzanji and federal Health Minister Saleh Al-Hasnawi met to discuss medicines procurement, health services for refugees, and collaboration across public and private sectors.

== International partnerships ==
=== World Health Organization ===
The WHO has provided technical and material assistance to the ministry across several health emergencies. In April 2020, WHO delivered medical supplies and equipment valued at approximately $427,000 to support the ministry's initial COVID-19 response, including intensive care ventilators, personal protective equipment, and emergency health kits. A further $1 million consignment followed in February 2021, and in January 2022 WHO delivered more than 20 tons of medical technologies worth over $2.5 million, funded by Germany, USAID, and Kuwait. WHO also partnered with the ministry on a series of community COVID-19 awareness campaigns in 2020, mobilizing hundreds of volunteers across Erbil, Duhok, and Sulaymaniyah, including in camps for internally displaced people.

=== Royal College of Pathologists ===
In December 2023, the ministry signed a memorandum of understanding with the Kurdistan Higher Council of Medical Specialties and the UK Royal College of Pathologists, establishing a collaboration to develop training in specialties including blood transfusion medicine, cytogenetics, and molecular testing in haematology.

== Cancer care ==
Cancer has emerged as a significant public health challenge. In 2023, approximately 9,911 new cases were diagnosed in the Kurdistan Region—roughly 27 per day—with breast cancer the most common type and Erbil governorate accounting for 55 percent of recorded diagnoses. The KRG established a dedicated Cancer Patient Assistance Fund providing more than 70 billion Iraqi dinars annually for cancer medicines and supplies.

In November 2023, Prime Minister Masrour Barzani laid the foundation stone for a LINAC radiotherapy center in Duhok—the first of its kind in the province—at a cost of $12 million, intended to allow residents to receive radiation therapy locally rather than travelling to other cities or abroad. In May 2025, the ministry inaugurated the renovated Umêd (Hope) Hospital in Duhok—a specialized cancer treatment and kidney dialysis facility—alongside plans for a children's cancer unit at Hevi Hospital and a bone marrow transplant center in the province.

== Ministers ==
Name	Tenure	Notes
Rekawt Rashid	2006–2019	
Saman Barzanji	2019–present	Previously head of Erbil municipality's health department

== See also ==
- Kurdistan Regional Government
- Healthcare in Iraq
- Ministry of Health (Iraq)
