= Ministry of Education (Kurdistan Region) =

Kurdistan Region ministry

- وەزارەتی پەروەردە; Wezaretî Perwerde
- Emblem of the Kurdistan Region

- Emblem of the Ministry of Education

Ministry overview
- Formed: 1992
- Jurisdiction: Kurdistan Region, Iraq
- Headquarters: Erbil, Kurdistan Region, Iraq
- Motto: پەروەردە بەرەو ئاسۆیەکی گەشتر; English: Education towards a brighter horizon
- Minister responsible: Alan Hama Saeed Salih, Minister of Education
- Website: gov.krd/moe-en/

The Ministry of Education of the Kurdistan Region (Kurdish: وەزارەتی پەروەردە, romanized: Wezaretî Perwerde) is the Kurdistan Regional Government (KRG) ministry responsible for overseeing and developing the pre-tertiary education sector in the Kurdistan Region. The ministry is mandated to develop the education sector in the Kurdistan Region, to foster the growth of scientific and technical expertise, and to create conditions in which people of all backgrounds can play an active role in social progress. It is distinct from the Ministry of Higher Education and Scientific Research, which oversees universities and scientific research institutions within the region.

The ministry is headquartered in Erbil, the capital of the Kurdistan Region, on Kurdistan Street next to the Kurdistan Parliament building.

== History ==
=== Pre-autonomy period ===
Before the Kurdish uprising in March 1991 and the subsequent establishment of a de facto autonomous Kurdish administration in northern Iraq, primary and secondary education in the region was almost entirely conducted in Arabic under the centralised system administered by the Ba'ath government in Baghdad. During Saddam Hussein's regime, school textbooks were heavily shaped by the ruling party's ideology; Kurdish contributions were marginalised and Kurdish historical figures were frequently Arabised in official curricula.

=== Establishment and early years (1991–2003) ===
Following the Kurdish uprising of 1991 and the establishment of a no-fly zone that allowed the KRG to function as a de facto regional government from 1992 onwards, the education system began undergoing gradual reform. Kurdish became the primary medium of instruction, replacing Arabic, and the curriculum was revised to reflect values of tolerance, democracy, and human rights rather than the Ba'athist ideology of the previous era. The number of schools expanded rapidly: from approximately 1,320 schools in the 1990–91 academic year to 5,746 by 2010–11, reflecting the accelerating investment in public education after autonomy was secured.

The Kurdistan Parliament enshrined the right of minority communities to study in their mother tongue into law in 1993, laying the legal foundation for the establishment of Syriac-language and Turkmen-language schools under the ministry's oversight. The first Turkmen school was established in 1993, following a decision made by then-President Masoud Barzani.

Following the 2003 invasion of Iraq, the KRG expanded its administrative functions significantly, and the Ministry of Education began producing its own textbooks independently, giving Kurdish educators greater control over the narratives and content taught in regional schools.

=== Curriculum reform (2007–present) ===
In 2007, the KRG embarked on a comprehensive reform of its kindergarten through Grade 12 (K–12) education system. The reform was driven by the urgent need to modernise an outdated curriculum, upgrade school facilities, and improve the overall quality of instruction. As part of the reform, compulsory education was extended to Grade 9, up from the previous requirement of Grade 6. The previous three-level structure—primary, intermediate, and secondary—was reorganised into two levels: basic education (Grades 1 to 9) and preparatory education (Grades 10 to 12). A new requirement that all prospective teachers obtain a bachelor's degree was also introduced.

Teacher institutes, previously the main route for training basic-education teachers, were in the process of being replaced by teacher colleges, each graduating students with a bachelor's degree.

More schools were built after 2003 than had been constructed in the region during the entire period from 1958 to 2003. RAND Corporation conducted a major study of the K–12 system in 2010–11 at the KRG's request, producing a series of recommendations that included building new schools and classrooms, improving teacher training, and redesigning the system for evaluating teacher performance.

== Organisation ==
The Ministry is headquartered on Kurdistan Street in Erbil, opposite Sami Abdulrahman Park, next to the Kurdistan Parliament building. Its organisational structure comprises the Minister, supported by a number of general directorates covering geographic, functional, and specialist areas.

The Ministry operates through the following general directorates:

- General Directorates for the governorates of Erbil, Sulaymaniyah, Duhok, Halabja, Garmian, and Kirkuk
- General Directorate of Iraqi Turkmen Studies
- General Directorate of Syriac Studies
- General Directorate of Sports and Artistic Activity
- General Directorate of Institutes and Training
- General Directorate of Programs and Publications
- General Directorate of Educational Supervision
- General Directorate of Facilities and Building
- General Directorate of Evaluation and Examinations
- General Directorate of Educational Planning
- General Directorate for Basic Education and Kindergartens
- General Directorate of Preparatory and Vocational Education

== Education system ==
=== Structure ===
The education system in the Kurdistan Region, as overseen by the Ministry, is structured across several levels. It begins with kindergarten (KG1 and KG2), which focuses on foundational social interaction and cognitive development. Basic education spans Grades 1 to 9 and emphasises core subjects and life skills. Preparatory education (Grades 10 to 12) offers specialised subjects and prepares students for higher education or vocational college pathways. Technical and vocational education and training (TVET) schools and institutes provide hands-on training in various trades.

Education is free to students through the university level and is compulsory through Grade 9. The three most populous governorates, Erbil, Duhok, and Sulaymaniyah, account for over 93 percent of the region's students.

=== National examinations ===
Students are required to pass national exit examinations at the end of Grade 9 and at the end of Grade 12 in order to proceed into post-secondary education. The Grade 12 examination, known as the Baccalaureate or Ministerial Examination, serves as the principal criterion for secondary school graduation and university admission. Examinations are sat every June at the end of the academic year. The KRG's national exit examination is accredited at both national and Iraqi federal levels.

=== Curriculum and language of instruction ===
A key aspect of the 2007 curriculum reform was the introduction of multilingual education, with students learning English and Arabic in addition to Kurdish from basic school onward. The mathematics curriculum adopts an incremental learning approach aligned with international standards, ensuring that students develop essential mathematical literacy from early childhood through to preparatory grades.

After 2005, the Ministry began producing textbooks independently, giving Kurdish educators greater control over curricula content. These textbooks emphasise Kurdish history, identity, and geography.

== Minister ==
Alan Hama Saeed Salih serves as the Minister of Education of the Kurdistan Region as of the ninth KRG cabinet.

== See also ==
- Ministry of Higher Education and Scientific Research (Kurdistan Region)
- Kurdistan Parliament
