= Rewaz Fayeq =

Kurdish politician from Iraq

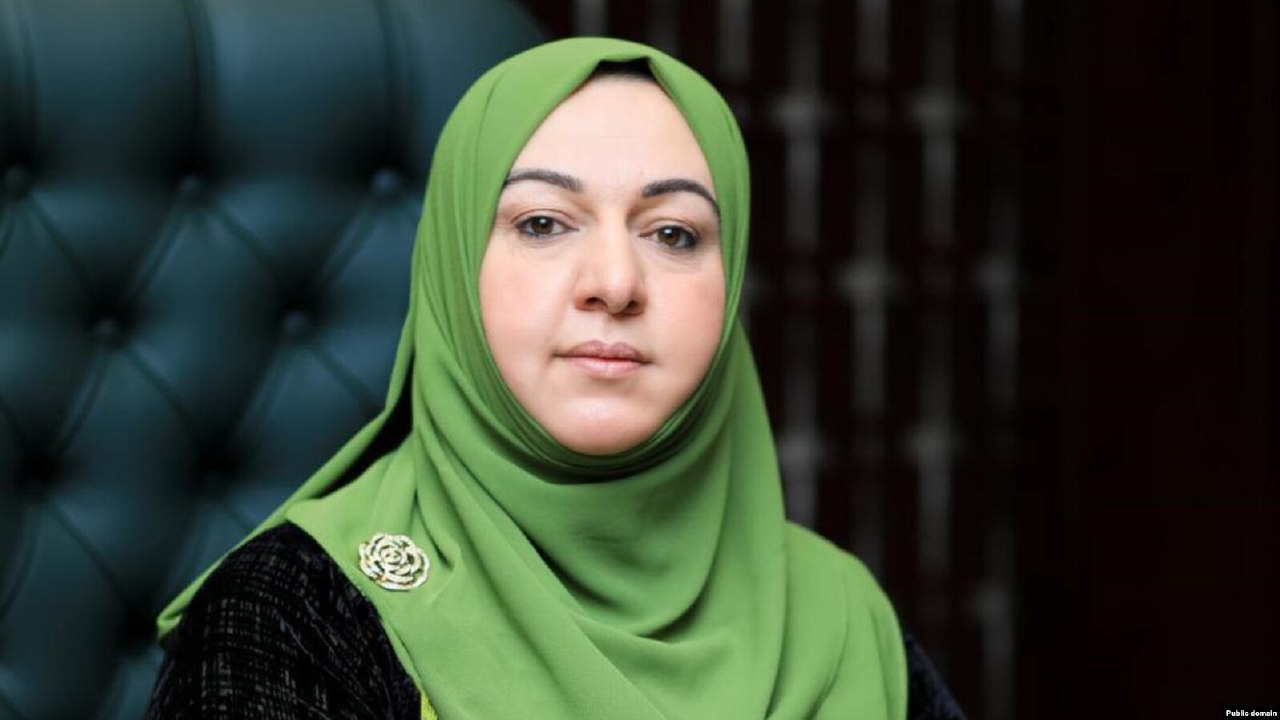

Speaker of Kurdistan Parliament
- In office 11 July 2019 – 2 July 2023
- Preceded by: Vala Fareed
- Succeeded by: Mohammed Suleiman (acting)

Personal details
- Born: 1 July 1977 (age 48) Sulaymaniyah, Iraq
- Party: Patriotic Union of Kurdistan

Rewaz Fayeq Hussein (born 1 July 1977) is an Iraqi jurist and politician who has been the Speaker of the Kurdistan Region Parliament since 2019, and is a member of parliament for the Patriotic Union of Kurdistan. She was the first woman elected as speaker. Prior to her tenure in parliament she was an assistant judge in Darbandikhan and a professor at Sulaimani Polytechnic University.

== Early life and education ==
Rewaz Fayeq Hussein was born in Sulaymaniyah, Iraq, on 1 July 1977. She holds a Bachelor of Laws, a master's degree in private international law, and a doctorate in civil law. She was an investigator and assistant judge for the court in Darbandikhan. At Sulaimani Polytechnic University she was a professor and head of the legal department.

== Career ==
Fayeq is a member of the Patriotic Union of Kurdistan (PUK) in the Kurdistan Region Parliament. During her tenure in parliament she has served on the Education, Energy and Natural Resources Industry, and Legal committees. She is a backup member of the PUK's political bureau.

Speaker Vala Fareed became Minister of the Government of the Kurdistan Region. Fayeq defeated Shadia Nawzad by a vote of 72 to 16 to be elected to succeed Fareed as speaker on 11 July 2019. She is the second woman to serve as speaker and the first one elected as Vala Fareed Ibrahim was appointed to the position.

== Personal life ==
Fayeq is a Kurd and a Muslim.

== Political positions ==
Fayeq was critical of President of Kurdistan Masoud Barzani during his dispute with Prime Minister Nouri al-Maliki and stated that Barzani did not have the right to decide the future of Iraqi Kurdistan.

== Works cited ==
=== News ===
- "Kurdistan Parliament elects new female speaker following KRG cabinet inauguration". Kurdistan 24. 11 July 2019.
- "Massoud Barzani has no right to decide the destiny of Iraqi Kurdistan: PUK‌'s MP Rewas Fayaq". Ekurd Daily. 9 March 2014. Archived from the original on 20 November 2022.
- "Message of PUK Leadership Council's Meeting". Patriotic Union of Kurdistan Media. 10 September 2023. Archived from the original on 15 July 2024.
- "Rewaz Fayaq elected as new speaker of Iraqi Kurdistan parliament". Ekurd Daily. 11 July 2019. Archived from the original on 14 July 2019.
- "Rewas Fayaq elected as new speaker of Kurdistan Parliament". Al Shahid. 12 July 2019. Archived from the original on 11 April 2020.

=== Web ===
- "د.رێواز فائق حسین". Kurdistan Region Parliament. Archived from the original on 7 July 2025.
