= Namiq =

Namiq is both a given name and a surname. Notable people with the name include:

- Namiq Ələsgərov (born 1995), Azerbaijani footballer
- Namiq Yusifov (born 1986), Azerbaijani footballer
- Jawhar Namiq (1946–2011), Iraqi politician
