= Adnan Mufti (politician) =

Iraqi Kurdish politician

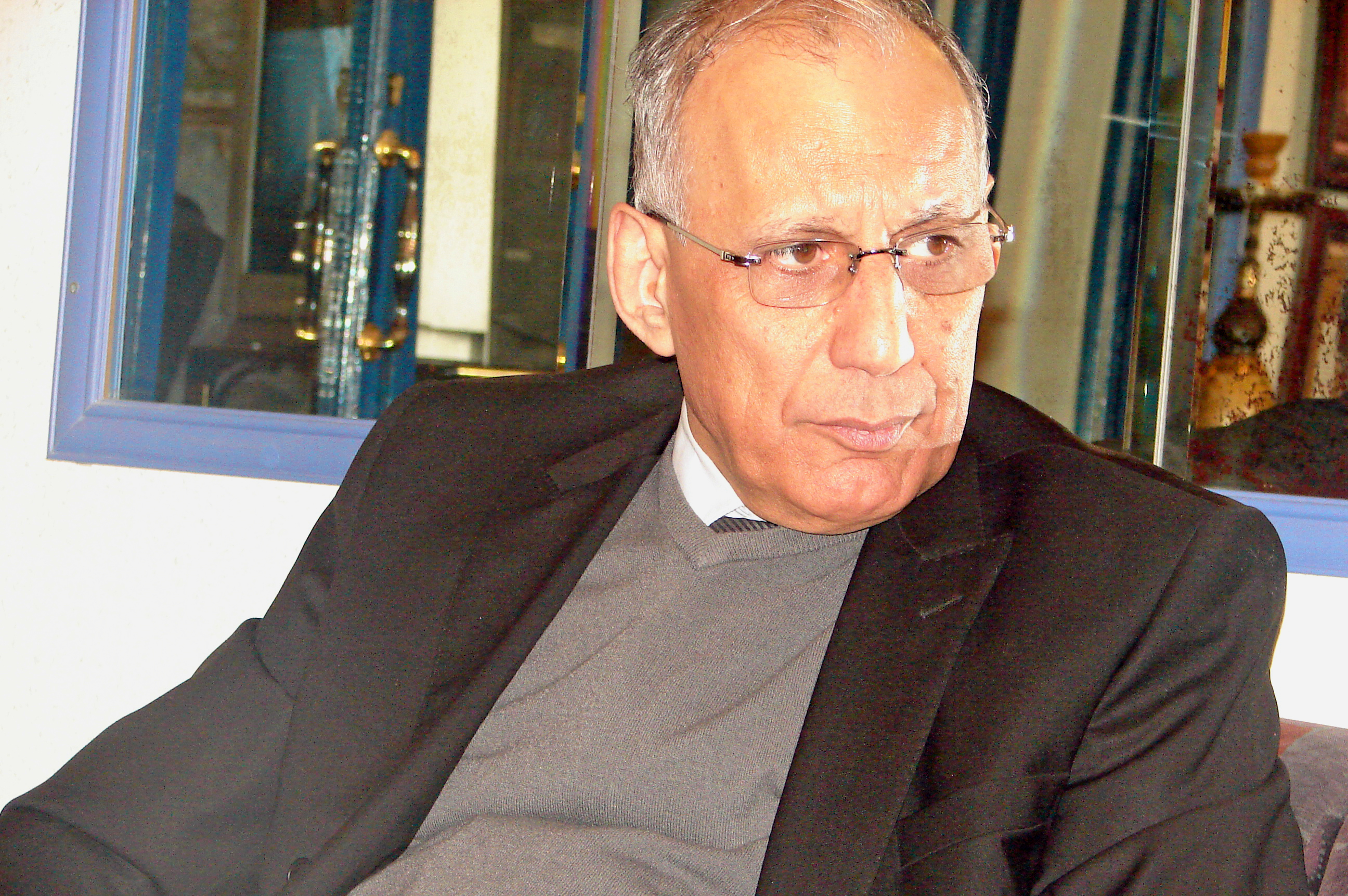

Speaker of Kurdistan Parliament
- In office 30 January 2005 – 20 August 2009
- Preceded by: Kamal Fuad
- Succeeded by: Kemal Kirkuki

Deputy Prime Minister of the Kurdistan Region (PUK-controlled area)
- In office 1999 – 30 January 2005
- Preceded by: Position established
- Succeeded by: Position abolished

Personal details
- Born: 1949 (age 76–77) Erbil
- Party: Patriotic Union of Kurdistan

Adnan Mufti is an Iraqi Kurdish politician of the Patriotic Union of Kurdistan.

Mufti was born in 1949 in Erbil. He has a bachelor's degree in accounting. He joined Kurdistan Democratic Party in 1963. In 1975, he joined the founding committee of the Patriotic Union of Kurdistan. In 1978 he returned to Iraqi Kurdistan and participated in the new revolution as a Peshmerga. In 1979 he was one of the founding members of the Kurdistan Socialist Party.

In 1999, Mufti was appointed as the minister of municipalities, minister of finance and economy and deputy prime minister of the Kurdistan Regional Government. He was elected Speaker of the Parliament after the elections of 2005 until 20 August 2009.
