= Omer Fattah Hussain =

Iraqi Kurdish politician

- عومەر فەتاح حوسەین

4th Prime Minister of Kurdistan Region (PUK-controlled part) (Acting)
- In office 4 July 2004 – 14 June 2005
- President: Jalal Talabani
- Preceded by: Barham Salih
- Succeeded by: Position Abolished

1st Deputy Prime Minister of the Kurdistan Region
- In office 1 March 2006 – 24 February 2009
- President: Masoud Barzani
- Prime Minister: Nechirvan Barzani
- Preceded by: Position Established
- Succeeded by: Imad Ahmad Sayfour

Personal details
- Born: 1948 (age 77–78) Sulaymaniyah, Kingdom of Iraq
- Party: Patriotic Union of Kurdistan
- Spouse: Kafia Sleman
- Children: Ara Omer Fatah, Ava Omer Fatah

Omer Fattah Hussain (Born Sulaymaniyah) was the former deputy Prime Minister of the Kurdistan Regional Government (KRG) in Kurdistan Region. Due to political problems in the PUK, he handed his resignation in on 24 February 2009. He also served as acting Prime Minister of Jalal Talebani's Suleimaniyeh based Kurdish administration from July 2004 (when Barham Salih resigned to become Deputy Prime Minister for the Iraqi Interim Government until June 2005 with the re-unification of Iraq's Kurdish autonomous Republic.

== See also ==
- List of Kurdish people
- Patriotic Union of Kurdistan

Political offices
Preceded by Barham Salih	Prime Minister of PUK-controlled Kurdistan (acting); 2004–2005	Succeeded by Position Abolished
Preceded by Post Created	Deputy Prime Minister of Iraqi Kurdistan; 2005–2009	Succeeded by Imad Ahmad Sayfour
