= Vala Fareed =

Minister of State for parliament affairs in the Kurdistan Region

Speaker of Kurdistan Parliament
- Incumbent
- Assumed office 4 November 2026
- Preceded by: Azad Mohammedamin (Acting)

Minister of State in the Kurdistan Regional Government for Parliament Affairs
- Incumbent
- Assumed office 11 July 2019

Interim Speaker of Kurdistan Parliament
- In office 18 February 2019 – 11 July 2019
- Preceded by: Yousif Muhammed Sadiq
- Succeeded by: Rewaz Fayeq

Personal details
- Born: 1976 (age 49–50) Erbil, Ba'athist Iraq
- Party: Kurdistan Democratic Party
- Education: PhD in Public Law at Salahaddin University
- Occupation: Politician, Lawyer, Lecturer (2003-2013)
- Profession: Law

Vala Fareed Ibrahim (born 1976) is the Minister of State for parliament affairs in the Kurdistan Regional Government of Iraq. She was elected as the first female speaker of the Kurdistan parliament in February 2019. And in November 4, 2026 she was re-elected as the speaker of the Kurdistan parliament and currently serves as the speaker.

== Early Life and Education ==
Fareed was born in 1976 in Erbil, Ba'athist Iraq, and earned a Bachelor's degree in Law at Salahaddin University in 1998, and earned a master's degree in public law at Salahaddin University in 2003. later in 2008 she earned a PhD in public law. Fareed was a lecturer at the Salahaddin University - College of law and politics from 2003 until 2013.

== Political Career ==
In September 2018 she was elected into the Kurdistan Parliament.

On 18 February 2019, Fareed was nominated by the Kurdistan Democratic Party (KDP), and received 68 votes. The session was boycotted by politicians from the Patriotic Union of Kurdistan (PUK), and Fareed was appointed as interim speaker until the PUK and KDP are able to reach agreement on a permanent appointment.

According to VOA, the KDP stated that once they and the PUK had reached an agreement, the role of speaker would revert to being a political appointee of the PUK. "Whenever there is an agreement between the two parties, we will withdraw our candidate and vote for the PUK candidate, per our agreement," said the PDK bloc leader Umed Khoshnaw. A draft agreement reached on February 5 requires a PUK representative to hold the post of parliamentary speaker.

Fareed's appointment means that two of the three top positions in the KRG parliament are occupied by women, with Muna Kahveci, from the Turkmen Reform Party, also being elected as second deputy speaker. The KRG parliament operates a quota system requiring 30% of MPs to be female.

In 2019, Fareed was appointed as Regional Minister of State in the KRG Cabinet.

Political offices
| Preceded by Yousif Muhammed Sadiq | Speaker of the Iraqi Kurdistan Parliament; 2019 | Succeeded by Rewaz Fayeq |
