= Imad Ahmad Sayfour =

Deputy Prime Minister of the Kurdistan Region
- In office 6 April 2009 – 27 October 2009
- President: Massoud Barzani
- Prime Minister: Nechervan Barzani
- Preceded by: Omer Fattah Hussain
- Succeeded by: Azad Barwari

Personal details
- Born: 1955 (age 70–71) Khanaqin
- Party: Patriotic Union of Kurdistan

Imad Ahmad Sayfour (born 1955) is a Kurdish, Iraqi politician. He was born in Khanaqin in 1955 and graduated from Baghdad Technical Institute in 1980. He is a senior member of Iraqi President Jalal Talebani's Patriotic Union of Kurdistan and has served as Minister for Housing and Reconstruction and as Deputy Prime Minister in the Kurdistan Regional Government.

== See also ==
- List of Kurdish people
- Patriotic Union of Kurdistan

Political offices
Preceded by unknown	Kurdish Minister of Housing and Reconstruction; 2006–2009	Succeeded by Kamaran Ahmed Abdullah
Preceded by Omer Fattah Hussain	Deputy Prime Minister of Iraqi Kurdistan; 2009	Succeeded by Azad Barwari
