= Begard Talabani =

Iraqi Kurdish politician

- بێگەرد تاڵەبانی
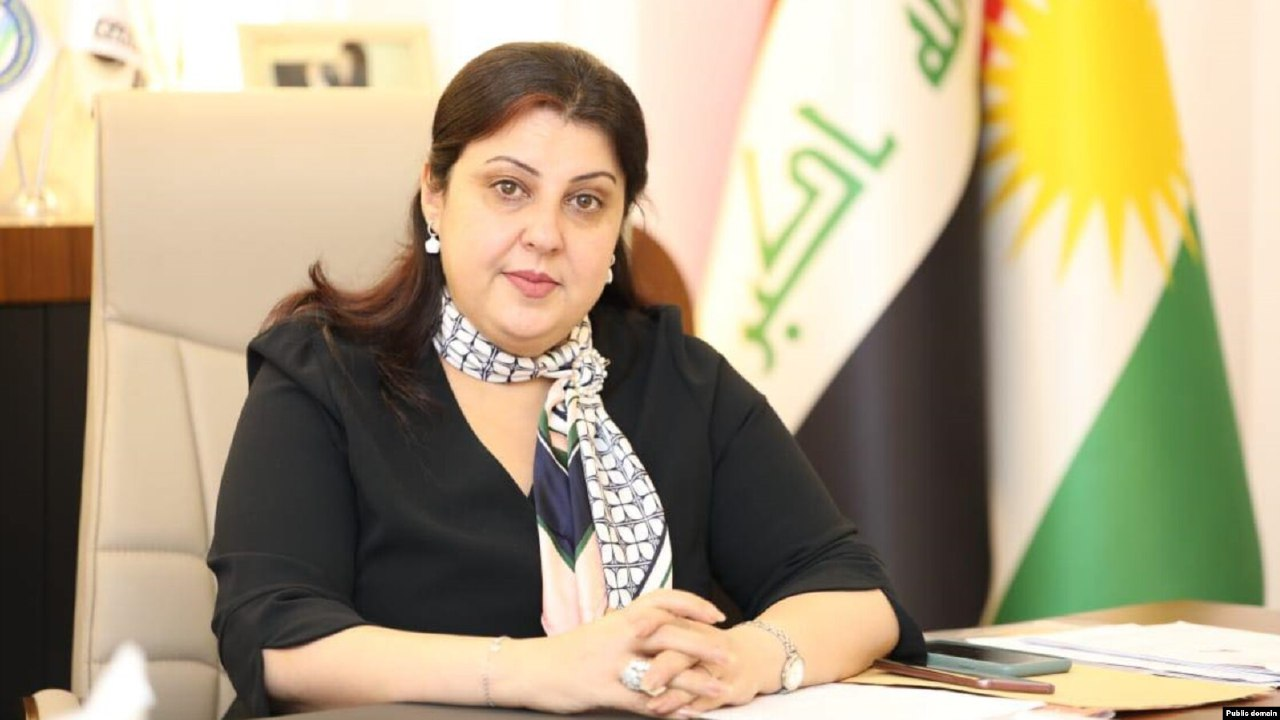

Minister of Agriculture and Water Resources
- Incumbent
- Assumed office 10 July 2019
- Preceded by: Abdulstar Majeed

Secretary of The Kurdistan Parliament
- In office 15 September 2017 – 2019
- Preceded by: fakhreddin Qadir
- Succeeded by: Muna Kahveci

Personal details
- Born: 27 December 1978 (age 47) Dukan, Slemani
- Party: Patriotic Union of Kurdistan
- Education: Bachelor's degree in Biological Sciences
- Alma mater: University of Sulaimani

Begard Dlshad Shukralla (Sorani Kurdish: بێگەرد دڵشاد شوکڕوڵڵا) or known as Begard Talabani (Sorani Kurdish: بێگەرد تاڵەبانی) (born December 27, 1978) is an Iraqi Kurdish politician who has served as The Minister of Agriculture and Water resources in the Kurdistan Regional Government of Iraq since July 10, 2019. Prior to that she served as the Secretary of Parliament in the Kurdistan Parliament. Talabani is an active member of the Patriotic Union of Kurdistan.

== Early life and Education ==
Talabani was born on December 27, 1978, in kelkan, dokan, Sulaymaniyah. She holds a Bachelor's degree in Biological Sciences.

== Career ==
=== MP and Secretary of Parliament ===
Talabani became a member of The Kurdistan Parliament in its fourth term following the 2013 Kurdistan Region parliamentary election. she was a part of Patriotic Union of Kurdistan (PUK)'s parliamentary bloc. she later assumed duties as the Secretary of Parliament on September 15, 2017.

=== MP and Minister ===
Talabani became a member of The Kurdistan Parliament in its fifth term following the 2018 Kurdistan Region parliamentary election. she was a member of the PUK parliamentary bloc. on July 10, 2019, she resigned as an MP and started her duties as The Minister of Agriculture and Water resources of The Kurdistan Regional Government.
