= Speaker of the Kurdistan Parliament =

Presiding officer of the Kurdistan Region's legislature

- سەرۆکی پەرلەمانی کوردستان
- Coat of arms of the Kurdistan Region
- Incumbent; Vala Fareed since 4 November 2026
- Status: Presiding officer
- Member of: Kurdistan Parliament
- Seat: Erbil, Kurdistan Region, Iraq
- Appointer: Members of the Kurdistan Parliament
- Constituting instrument: Law No. 1 (1992)
- Formation: 4 June 1992
- First holder: Jawhar Namiq
- Deputy: Rami Nouri
- Website: Kurdistan Parliament

The Speaker of the Kurdistan Parliament (Kurdish: سەرۆکی پەرلەمانی کوردستان) is the presiding officer of the Kurdistan Parliament, the legislature of the Kurdistan Region in Iraq. The speaker is elected by the members of the parliament and is responsible for maintaining order during sessions, overseeing the parliament's administration, and representing the legislature in its relations with the Kurdistan Regional Government and the Iraqi federal government.

The position was established on 4 June 1992, following the 1992 elections that came after the 1991 Kurdish uprising. The first speaker was Jawhar Namiq of the Kurdistan Democratic Party, who was elected at the parliament's first session on 4 June 1992 and served until 1999.

The current speaker is Dr. Vala Fareed of the Kurdistan Democratic Party, who took office on November 4, 2026, following an election in a session attended by 52 out of the 100 members of the parliament which was boycotted the Patriotic Union of Kurdistan and the New Generation Movement. Fareed presides over the sixth term of the Kurdistan Parliament.

The speaker is assisted by a deputy speaker and a secretary, who together form the Presidency of the Kurdistan Parliament. The current Deputy Speaker is Rami Nouri (Independent), and the secretary is Muna Kahveci (Türkmen Reform Partisi).

== List of speakers ==
Since its establishment in 1992, the Kurdistan Parliament has had several speakers. The position is elected by members of the parliament at the beginning of each term.

| No. | Portrait | Name (Birth–Death) | Term of office | | Term | Political party | Ref. |
| No. | Portrait | Name (Birth–Death) | Took office | Left office | Term | Political party | Ref. |
|---|---|---|---|---|---|---|---|
| 1 | — | Jawhar Namiq Salim (1945–2011) | 4 June 1992 | October 1999 | 1 (1992) | Kurdistan Democratic Party | |
| 2 | | Roj Shaweis (1947–2021) | October 1999 | January 2003 | 1 | Kurdistan Democratic Party | |
| 3 | | Kamal Fuad (1932–2014) | January 2003 | 4 June 2005 | 1 | Patriotic Union of Kurdistan | |
| 4 | | Adnan Mufti (born 1949) | 4 June 2005 | 20 August 2009 | 1 (2005) | Patriotic Union of Kurdistan | |
| 5 | | Kemal Kirkuki (born 1954) | 20 August 2009 | 15 February 2012 | 1 (2009) | Kurdistan Democratic Party | |
| 6 | — | Arsalan Baiz (born 1950) | 15 February 2012 | 28 April 2014 | 1 | Patriotic Union of Kurdistan | |
| 7 | | Yousif Muhammed Sadiq (born 1978) | 28 April 2014 | 18 February 2019 | 1 | Gorran Movement | |
| 8 | — | Vala Fareed (born 1976) | 18 February 2019 | 11 July 2019 | (Interim speaker) | Kurdistan Democratic Party | |
| 9 | | Rewaz Fayeq (born 1977) | 11 July 2019 | July 2, 2023 | 1 | Patriotic Union of Kurdistan | |
| — | — | Mohammed Suleiman (born 1976) | 2 December 2024 | 22 January 2025 | (Acting) | New Generation Movement | |
| — | — | Azad Mohammedamin (born 1970) | 22 January 2025 | Unknown | (Acting) | Patriotic Union of Kurdistan | |
| 11 | — | Vala Fareed (born 1976) | 4 November 2026 | Incumbent | 1 | Kurdistan Democratic Party | |

== See also ==
- Kurdistan Region Parliament
- Kurdistan Regional Government
- President of the Kurdistan Region
- Prime Minister of the Kurdistan Region
- Deputy Prime Minister of the Kurdistan Region
