= Faranji =

Traditional Kurdish garment

The Faranji is a traditional Kurdish woollen garment. Also known as a pastas or kullaball, it is handmade by compressingsheep's wool into thick felt to provide warmth during cold winters.

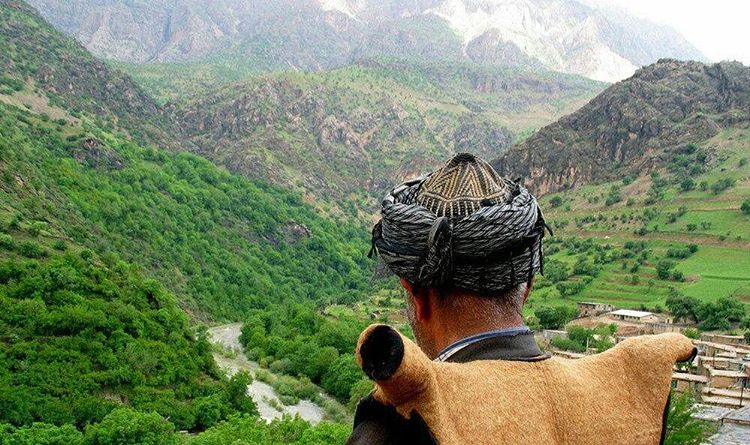
A Kurdish man from Avroman wearing a Faranji

== Design and use ==
The faranji is a traditional Kurdish woollen garment. Also known as a pastas or kullaball, it is handmade by compressing sheep's wool into thick felt to provide warmth during cold winters. It is also worn as part of Kurdish traditional dress. Despite the availability and lower price of modern winter coats, the faranji continues to be sold.

== Louis Vuitton design controversy ==
In 2026 the Kurdistan Region Ministry of Culture and Youth announced plans to file a complaint against Louis Vuitton over a design it says resembles the traditional Faranji garment. Ministry spokesperson Namiq Hawrami said traditional Kurdish clothing should be acknowledged when referenced or copied by international brands. The ministry tasked the KRG Department of Foreign Relations with delivering the complaint to French authorities.
