= Barham Salih =

President of Iraq from 2018 to 2022

- بەرھەم ساڵح برهم صالح
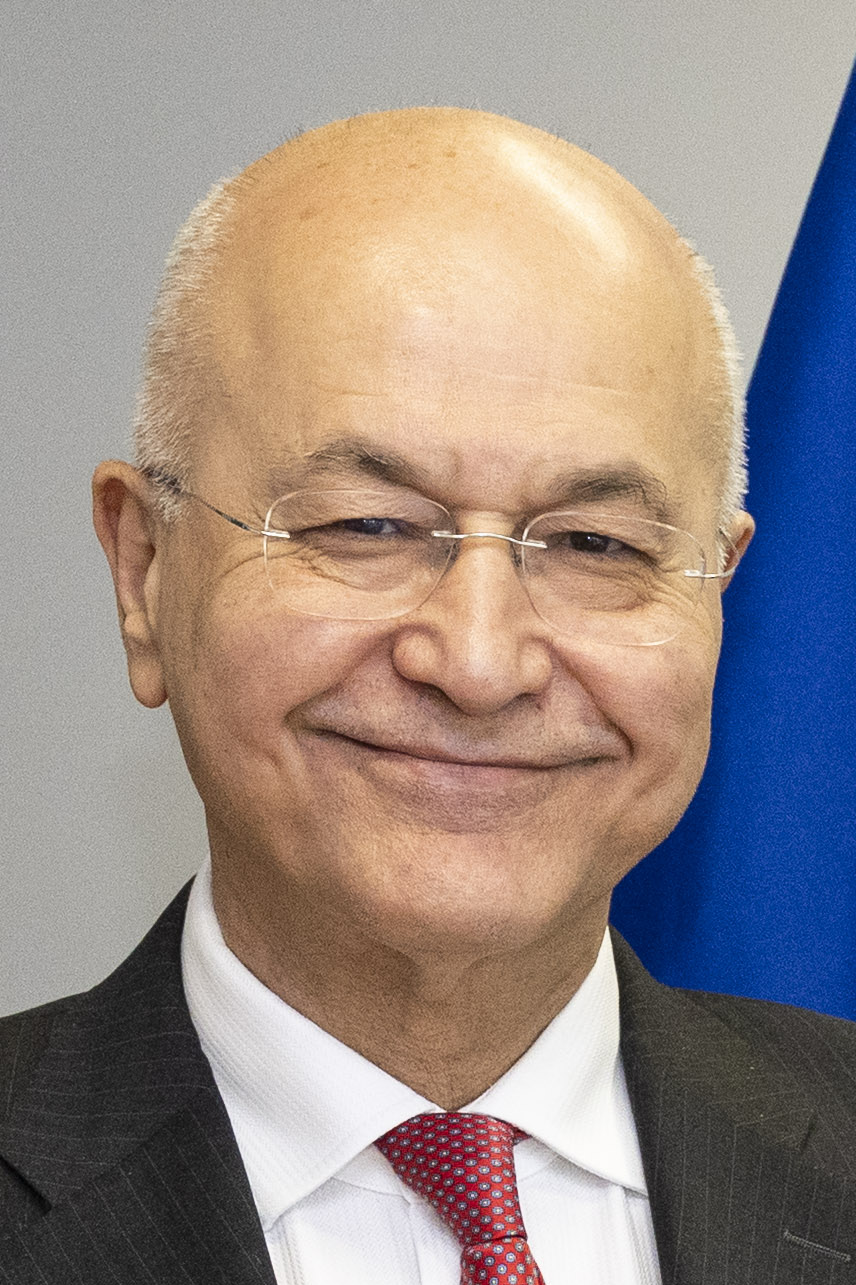
- Salih in 2026

United Nations High Commissioner for Refugees
- Incumbent
- Assumed office 1 January 2026
- Secretary-General: António Guterres
- Preceded by: Filippo Grandi

8th President of Iraq
- In office 2 October 2018 – 17 October 2022
- Prime Minister: Haider Al-Abadi; Adil Abdul-Mahdi; Mustafa Al-Kadhimi
- Vice President: Vacant
- Preceded by: Fuad Masum
- Succeeded by: Abdul Latif Rashid

Deputy Prime Minister of Iraq
- In office 20 May 2006 – 20 August 2009 Serving with Salam al-Zaubai and Rafi al-Issawi
- Prime Minister: Nouri al-Maliki
- Preceded by: Roj Shaweis
- Succeeded by: Roj Shaweis
- In office 28 June 2004 – 3 May 2005
- Prime Minister: Ayad Allawi
- Preceded by: Coalition Provisional Authority
- Succeeded by: Roj Shaweis

Minister of Planning
- In office 3 May 2005 – 20 May 2006
- Prime Minister: Ibrahim al-Jaafari
- Preceded by: Mahdi al-Hafez
- Succeeded by: Ali Baban

Prime Minister of Kurdistan Region
- In office 28 October 2009 – 5 April 2012
- President: Masoud Barzani
- Preceded by: Nechirvan Barzani
- Succeeded by: Nechirvan Barzani

3rd Prime Minister of Kurdistan Region (PUK-controlled part)
- In office 21 January 2001 – 15 July 2004
- President: Jalal Talabani
- Preceded by: Kosrat Rasul Ali
- Succeeded by: Omer Fattah Hussain (acting)

Chair of Board of Trustees at The American University of Iraq, Sulaimani
- In office 2007–2017
- Preceded by: Position established
- Succeeded by: Jill Derby

Personal details
- Born: Barham Ahmed Salih; 8 September 1960 (age 66) Sulaymaniyah, Iraqi Republic
- Citizenship: Iraq; United Kingdom
- Party: Patriotic Union of Kurdistan (1976–2017, 2018–present)
- Other political affiliations: Coalition for Democracy and Justice (2017–2018)
- Spouse: Sarbagh Salih
- Children: 2
- Education: Cardiff University; University of Liverpool

Barham Salih (Kurdish: بەرھەم ساڵح, romanized: Berhem Salih; Arabic: برهم صالح, romanized: Barham Ṣāliḥ; born 8 September 1960) is an Iraqi Kurdish politician who has been serving as United Nations High Commissioner for Refugees since 1 January 2026. He previously served as the president of Iraq from 2018 to 2022. Salih also served as 2nd deputy secretary general of the Patriotic Union of Kurdistan.

He is the former prime minister of the Kurdistan Region and a former deputy prime minister of the Iraqi federal government. He was elected and assumed office as president of Iraq on 2 October 2018. Salih is the third non-Arab president of Iraq, succeeding Fuad Masum, who is also Kurdish. In October 2022 he lost his re-election to Abdul Latif Rashid.

== Early life and education ==
Salih was born in 1960 in Sulaymaniyah. He was arrested in 1979 by the Ba'athist regime twice on charges of involvement in the Kurdish national movement by taking some photos of protesters in Sulaimaniyah city and spent 43 days in detention in a Special Investigation Commission prison in Kirkuk where he was tortured. Once released, he finished high school and left Iraq for the United Kingdom to flee continued persecution.

== Personal life ==
Salih is married to Sarbagh Salih, the head and founding member of the Kurdish Botanical Foundation and a women's rights activist. The couple have two children.

== Career ==
=== Deputy Secretary General of Patriotic Union of Kurdistan ===
Barham Salih joined the Patriotic Union of Kurdistan (PUK) in late 1976 where he became a member of the PUK department of Europe, and was in charge of PUK foreign relations in London. In addition to the political struggle, he finished his university studies and received a Bachelors degree in Civil Engineering and Construction from the Cardiff University in 1983. He continued to study and obtained a Doctorate degree in Statistics and Computer Applications in Engineering from the University of Liverpool in 1987.

He was elected a member of the PUK leadership at the first party conference when Iraqi Kurdistan was liberated from the Ba'ath Party following the Persian Gulf War. He was assigned the task of heading the PUK Office in the United States.

After the fall of the Ba'athist regime in 2003, he became Deputy Prime Minister in the Interim Iraqi Government in mid-2004, Minister of Planning in the Transitional Government in 2005, and Deputy Prime Minister in the elected Iraqi Government (Nouri al-Maliki's Cabinet) in charge of the economic portfolio and Head of the Economic Committee. Representing the Iraqi Government, he launched the International Compact with Iraq – an initiative of mutual commitment between Iraq and the international community to help Iraq in meeting its obligations of "building a prosperous, democratic and federal country, in peace with itself and with the region and the world".

Salih appeared on The Colbert Report on 10 June 2009, broadcast from Baghdad, and was interviewed by the host. He praised the U.S. military for sending troops into Iraq, and acknowledged that many Kurds desire independence.

=== Prime Minister of the Kurdistan Region Government ===
Barham Salih spearheaded the Kurdistani List in the 2009 Iraqi Kurdistan legislative election. The list won 59 of 111 seats. He succeeded Nechervan Idris Barzani as the Prime Minister of the Kurdistan Regional Government. His term was marked by turbulence with the rise of an opposition (Movement for Change) to challenge the government while his own party was scrambling to stay together after losing the stronghold city of Sulaymaniyah. He survived the first motion of no confidence in Iraqi Kurdistan following the 2011 Kurdish protests in Iraq. He signed the first major oil contract with ExxonMobil after drafting and amending a new oil law. He relinquished the post of Prime Minister to Nechervan Idris Barzani on 5 April 2012 as part of a political agreement between the ruling KDP–PUK coalition.

=== Foundation of an own party and subsequent return to PUK ===
In September 2017, Salih announced that he was leaving the PUK and forming a new opposition party, the Coalition for Democracy and Justice, to compete in the forthcoming Iraqi Kurdistan elections. Following the death of PUK leader Jalal Talabani and the Kurdish opposition leader Nawshirwan Mustafa, the alliance was seen to have the potential to change the Kurdish political landscape. He said he hoped to gather all the other opposition parties, including Gorran and Komal, to challenge the governing KDP–PUK alliance.

In the 2018 Iraqi parliamentary election, it won two seats. On September 19, 2018, Barham Salih left the party to rejoin the Patriotic Union of Kurdistan, which nominated him as a candidate for Iraq's Presidency. Others joined Salih in his return to PUK, but the party leadership made clear that it would not be going to disband itself. On 9 November 2018, the party held a conference, where it renamed itself to National Coalition and elected Aram Qadirî as its leader. There were some legal problems, which were solved at the beginning of December, when the Independent High Electoral Commission moved to legally dissolve the no longer existing CDJ.

=== President of Iraq ===
On 2 October 2018, Salih was elected as the eighth president of Iraq. He received 219 votes and defeated Fuad Hussein who secured 22 votes.

Salih condemned the 2019 Turkish offensive into north-eastern Syria, stating that it "will cause untold humanitarian suffering, empower terrorist groups. The world must unite to avert a catastrophe, promote political resolution to the rights of all Syrians, including Kurds, to peace, dignity and security".

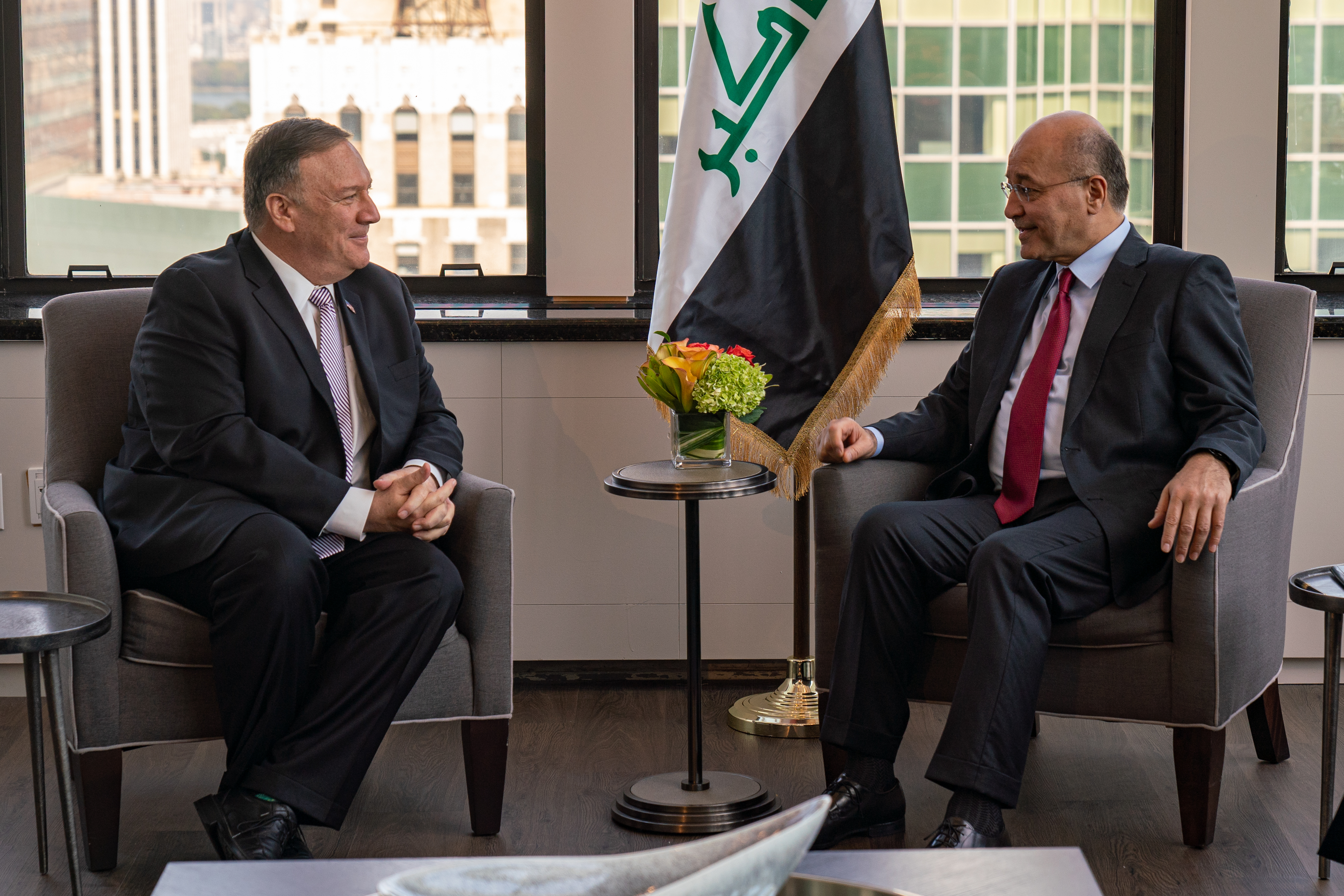
Salih meets with U.S. Secretary of State Michael R. Pompeo on the margins of the 74th Session of the United Nations General Assembly in New York City on September 22, 2019.

In March 2019, Salih submitted the groundbreaking "Yazidi Female Survivors Law" to Parliament for review. The ground-breaking bill set forth a number of reparation measures for female Yazidi survivors of captivity. It was seen by the Yazidi leaders as an important step toward a secure future for the survivors, and so they could move on and rebuild their homes, which were destroyed by IS fighting. On 1 March 2021, Parliament passed the Yazidi [Female] Survivors Bill into law, and the law was welcomed by Nadia Murad as "an important first step in acknowledging the gender-based trauma of sexual violence and need for tangible redress."

On 24 September 2019, President Salih had his first bilateral meeting with U.S. President Donald Trump.

On 26 December 2019, Salih submitted a letter of resignation after refusing to appoint Basra Governor Asaad Al Eidani as Prime Minister following the resignation of Adil Abdul-Mahdi, amid ongoing protests across the country. Salih stated that Al Eidani would not be approved by the demonstrators.

=== United Nations ===
On 18 December 2025, Salih was elected as United Nations High Commissioner for Refugees by the United Nations General Assembly. He took up the role on 1 January 2026.

== Assassination attempt ==
On 2 April 2002, Salih survived an assassination attempt by Ansar al-Islam. While returning to his residence on Tuesday afternoon, he was attacked by three gunmen. According to regional reports, the assailants killed the head of his private office and four bodyguards before two of the attackers were shot dead and a third was wounded and captured.

== Criticism ==
On 19 September 2018, the announcement that Barham Salih will be the PUK's candidate for the post of Iraqi president was greeted with anger by many on social media while others expressed hope that his international reputation and experience would bring a steady hand to tumultuous Baghdad. Some took to the social media platform to call Salih out for perceived opportunism, noting he had just recently been campaigning against PUK and KDP corruption.

Political offices
Preceded by Kosrat Rasul Ali	Prime Minister of PUK-controlled Kurdistan; January 2001 – July 2004	Succeeded by Omer Fattah Hussain (acting)
Preceded by none	Deputy Prime Minister for National Security; June 2004 – May 2005	Succeeded by Ahmed Chalabi; Ruz Nuri Shawis; Abid Mutlak al-Jubouri
Preceded by Mahdi al-Hafez	Minister of Planning and Development Cooperation; May 2005 – May 2006	Succeeded by Ali Baban
Preceded by Ahmed Chalabi; Ruz Nuri Shawis; Abid Mutlak al-Jubouri	Deputy Prime Minister for National Security; May 2006 – August 2009	Succeeded by Rafi al-Issawi
Preceded by Nechervan Idris Barzani	Prime Minister of Iraqi Kurdistan; August 2009– January 2012	Succeeded by Nechervan Idris Barzani
Preceded by Fuad Masum	President of Iraq; 2018–2022	Succeeded by Abdul Latif Rashid
