= Ali Baban =

Iraqi politician

Ali Ghalib Baban (Arabic: علي غالب بابان) is the former Iraqi Minister of Planning and Development Co-operation in the government of Nouri al-Maliki. A Sunni Kurd, he was elected to the National Assembly of Iraq in December 2005 on the Iraqi Accord Front coalition as a member of the Sunni Arab-majority Iraqi Islamic Party and led the negotiations with Maliki for the Iraqi Accord Front

Before his election he was the editor of the weekly Arabic language newspaper of the Iraqi Islamic Party, Dar al-Salam. He is of Kurdish origin.

When the Iraqi Accordance Front withdrew from the Iraqi government in August 2007, Baban stayed on as Planning Minister. He was expelled from the Front and the Iraqi Islamic Party.

== Policies ==
Baban has made the following policy statements:

On privatisation:

"Iraq won't rush into privatizing its industries ... the recent move of keeping the import door open without regulations and restrictions has put an end to many factories"

On private sector businesses:

"Many of the private factories are still small and cannot do the required task ... we urge Iraqi businessmen to merge their companies and establish big ones ... it is [also] necessary to merge small Iraqi banks into big banks."

On inflation:

"The inflation rate from July 2005 to July 2006 stood at 69.6 percent ... this indicates that inflation has not just increased, but it is out of control"

On corruption:

"Huge amounts of funds were wasted because of bureaucracy, corruption, incapacity and the spending of money on unimportant projects"
"We are living in an atmosphere of chaos. Corruption has spread in the Iraqi state in an unprecedented manner"

On the information society:

"We seek to promote the use of computers and other tools related to electronic knowledge ... and research and development in the information field. We want to catch up with the information revolution, which has swept up the world, and we want to create an information society"

On foreign aid:

"As for loans and grants, I can say, quite frankly, that we have heard a great deal of talk, but received very little ... some of the money was spent abroad ... some of it was paid to foreign experts and consultants; some of it was spent on foreign services; and some of it was spent on areas that are not priorities"

On subsidies:

"I hope the IMF will take into consideration the situation in Iraq and not pressure us to ... cancel subsidies ... lifting these subsidies now would undermine confidence in the government"

On federalism and oil:

"The federalist constitution that allocates oil resources to regional authorities will make foreign companies hesitate to invest a dollar in new Iraqi fields ... this might threaten the future of the Iraqi petroleum industry ... the constitution would have to be amended"

Preceded by Barham Salih	Minister of Planning and Development Co-operation; May 2006 – ?	Succeeded by ?
