= 2018 Iraqi presidential election =

- 2 October 2018

329 members of the Council of Representatives
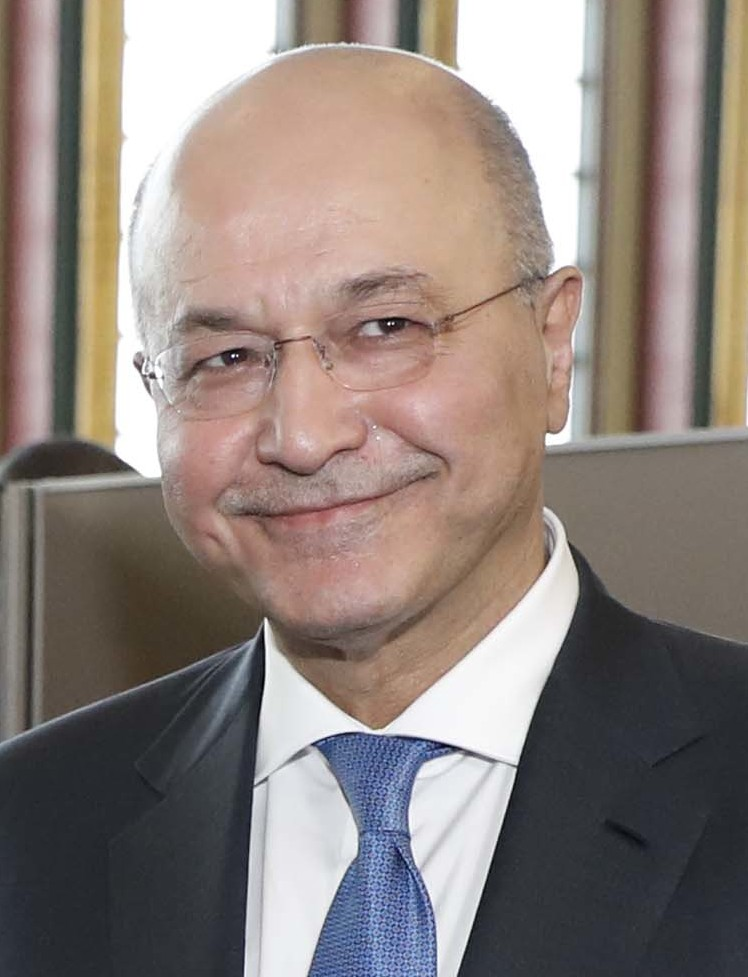

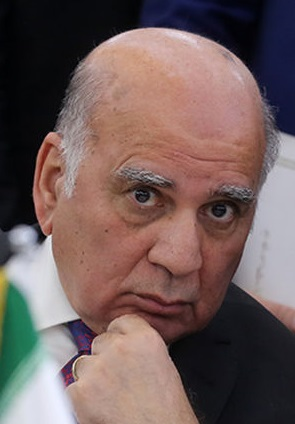
Candidate	Barham Salih	Fuad Hussein
Party	PUK	KDP
Indirect vote	219	22
Percentage	90.87%	9.13%
President before election
Fuad Masum
PUK
Elected President
Barham Salih
PUK

Presidential elections were held in Iraq on 2 October 2018 to elect the President of Iraq for a four-year term via indirect suffrage by the Council of Representatives. The result was a win for Barham Salih, who received 219 votes. The position is largely ceremonial, with Iraq being a parliamentary system.

There were 31 candidates for the election, with only seven being approved to run.

== Results ==
Candidate	Party	First round		Second round	
Candidate	Party	Votes	%	Votes	%
Barham Salih	Patriotic Union of Kurdistan	165	58.72	219	90.87
Fuad Hussein	Kurdistan Democratic Party	89	31.67	22	9.13
Sarwa Abdel Wahid	Independent	18	6.41		
Abbas Mohammed Nouri		4	1.42		
Nawar Saad Al-Mulla		2	0.71		
Munqith Abdul Latif Al-Saffa		2	0.71		
Thaer Ghanem		1	0.36		
Total		281	100.00	241	100.00
Valid votes		281	93.05	241	88.60
Invalid votes		13	4.30	24	8.82
Blank votes		8	2.65	7	2.57
Total votes		302	100.00	272	100.00
Registered voters/turnout		329	91.79	329	82.67
Source: Parliament of Iraq
