= Saman Barzanji =

Iraqi politician

Dr. Saman Hussein Muhammad Barzanji
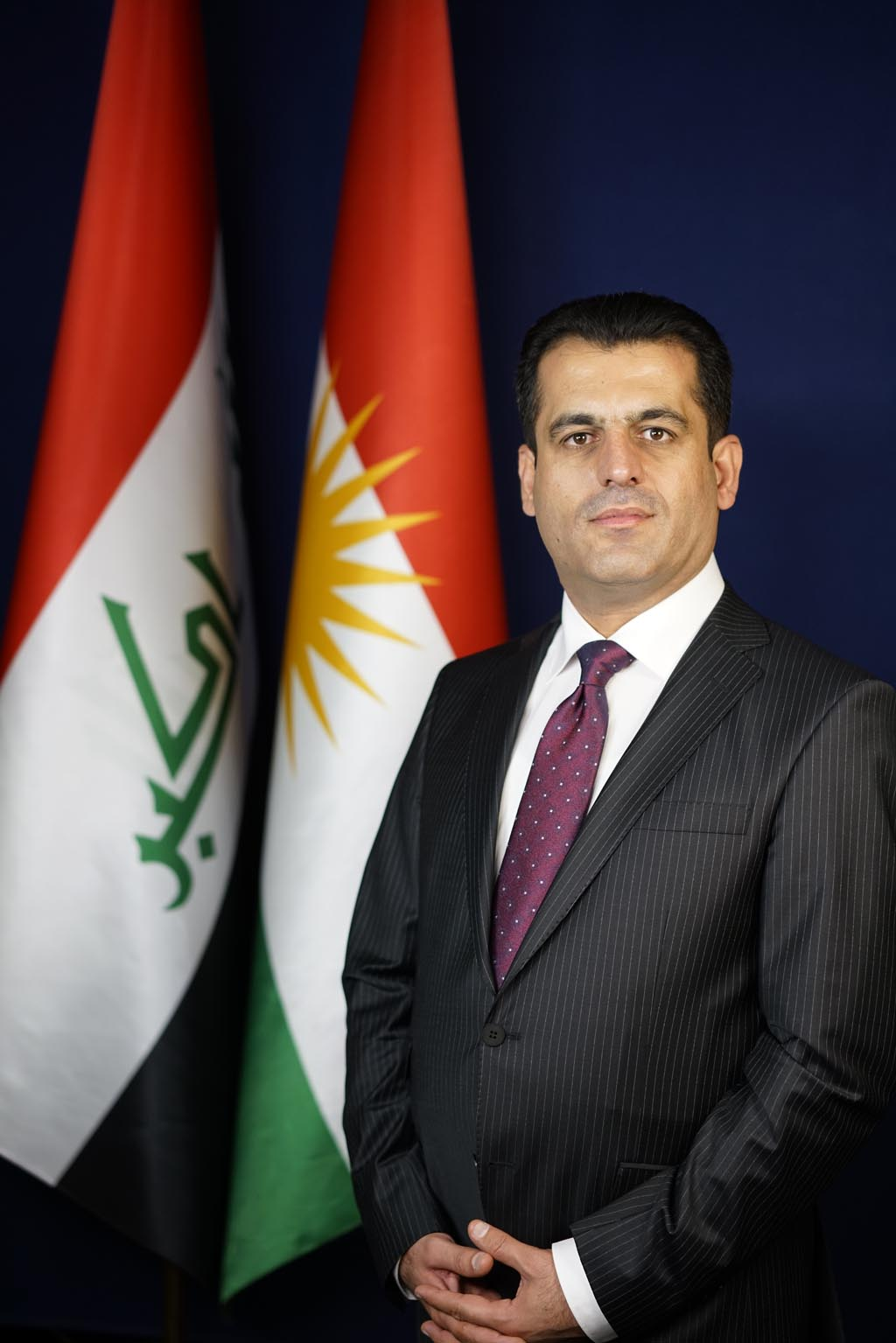

Health Minister of the Kurdistan Regional Government
- Incumbent
- Assumed office 2019
- Preceded by: Rekawt Rashid

Dr. Saman Barzanji is the Health Minister of the Kurdistan Regional Government in Iraq.

Prior to his appointment as KRG health minister, Barzanji was the head of Erbil municipality's health department. Barzanji helped to respond to the public health problems caused by the conflict with ISIS.

Barzanji has been one of the main public officials responsible for responding to the Coronavirus disease outbreak in the Kurdistan Region of Iraq. He has given frequent updates on the spread of the virus at press conferences.
