= Yousif Muhammed Sadiq =

Iraqi Kurdish politician

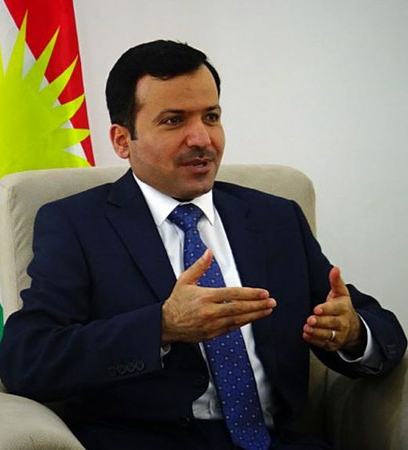
- Sadiq in 2022

Speaker of Kurdistan Parliament
- In office 29 April 2014 – 18 February 2019
- Preceded by: Arsalan Baiz
- Succeeded by: Vala Fareed

Member of the Council of Representatives
- In office 3 September 2018 – 7 October 2021
- Constituency: Sulaymaniyah Governorate

Member of the Kurdistan Region Parliament
- In office 29 April 2014 – 18 February 2019
- Constituency: Sulaymaniyah Governorate

Personal details
- Born: 14 July 1978 (age 48) Khurmal, Halabja Governorate
- Party: Gorran Movement
- Education: Nahrain University (PhD)
- Occupation: Academic, Politician
- Website: Personal Twitter

Yousif Muhammed Sadiq (Kurdish: یووسف محەممەد سادق, born 14 July 1978) is an Iraqi Kurdish politician and academic. A member of the Gorran Movement, he served as Speaker of the Kurdistan Region Parliament from 2014 to 2019, representing Sulaymaniyah Governorate. He later served as a member of the Council of Representatives of Iraq from 2018 to 2021.

Sadiq was born in Khurmal, in the Halabja Governorate.

== Education ==
Sadiq holds a Master's degree in International Politics from Nahrain University (2007) and a PhD in Philosophy of Political Science with a thesis titled "Factors Affecting the Political Future of the Kurdistan Region-Iraq".

== Career ==
=== Academic career ===
Sadiq served as Head of the Department of Political Science at the College of Political and Social Sciences, University of Sulaymaniyah from 2008 to 2010.

=== Political activities ===
Before becoming Speaker of Parliament, Sadiq was involved in various political and civil activities:

- Coordinator of the General Public Movement (2007-2009)
- Participated in civil activities with organizations including KIE, DHRD, NED, and UNDP (2003-2010)
- Coordinator of an academic and legal committee reviewing the Kurdistan Region draft constitution (2008)
- Main contributor to opposition proposals for amending the regional constitution and reform packages
- Coordinator of the Political Research Chamber of the Gorran Movement (from 2010)
- Representative in the National Assembly of the Gorran Movement

=== Speaker of Parliament ===
On April 29, 2014, Sadiq was elected Speaker of the Kurdistan Parliament, a position he held until February 2019.

== Political positions ==
=== Views on Kirkuk ===
On May 26, 2015, as Speaker of the Parliament, Sadiq met with a delegation from the Turkmen faction in the Kirkuk Provincial Council. During this meeting, he stated: "Kirkuk is a Kurdish city, but it has its own characteristics and consists of various ethnic components besides Kurds. We hope that the people of Kirkuk preserve this diversity of population and components."

He further explained that while drafting the constitution of Kurdistan, "Kirkuk and other disputed areas are referred to as a main part of the Kurdistan Region, but we take into account the specifics of these areas. We will not impose any decision on Kirkuk because there are other ethnicities and components in these areas besides Kurds. When these areas return to the Kurdistan Region, all rights of these components will be protected by law in the constitution."

Sadiq also highlighted the role of Peshmerga forces in protecting all components of Kirkuk without discrimination, stating, "If it weren't for the Peshmerga, terrorists would have created a bloodbath in those areas, so all nationalities should take into account this bravery of the Peshmerga."

Political offices
Preceded by Arsalan Baiz	Speaker of the Iraqi Kurdistan Parliament; 2014–2019	Succeeded by Vala Fareed
