= Saleh Yousefi =

Kudish-Iraqi politician (1918–1981)

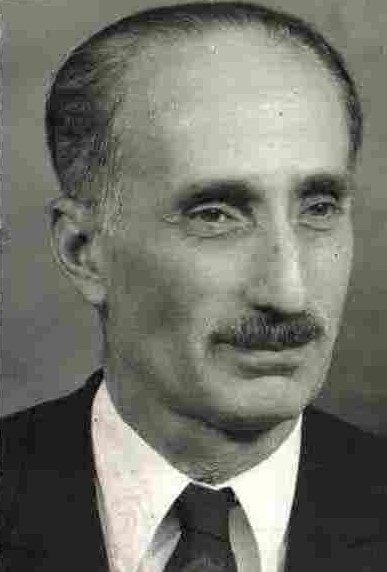

Personal details
- Born: January 1918 Zakho, Ottoman Empire
- Died: June 25, 1981 (aged 63) Baghdad, Iraqi Republic
- Party: KSDP; KDP

Saleh Yousefi (Kurdish: ساڵح یوسفی; January 1918 – 25 June 1981) was a Kurdish Iraqi poet and politician, former minister, and one of the most active members in the Kurdistan Democratic Party in Iraq.

Yousefi was one of the founder members of Brosik Association in 1938 Then one of the memorable founders of the Democratic Party of Kurdistan in 1946. Later, after the coup of July in 1958, he became responsible on the 5th branch of the Democratic Party of Kurdistan.

In 1967, he became the head of Taakhi newspaper which speaks for the Democratic Party of Kurdistan. In 1970, after declaring the accord of March 11 he took over many political positions, such as state minister, vice-president of the Iraqi-Soviet’s Cooperation and Friendship Association, the president of the Kurdish Literati and Writers Union, a member of the Iraqi Council for Peace and Solidarity, and other political positions in Iraq.

After the Algiers agreement between Iraq and Iran in 1975, Saleh Yousefi ended up settling in Baghdad. In May 1976, Yousefi founded the Kurdish Socialist Democratic Movement.

== Death ==
Saleh Yousefi was assassinated at his residence in Baghdad by an explosive post package on June 25, 1981
