= Mahdi al-Hafez =

Iraqi politician

Mahdi Ahmed al-Hafez (1 July 1943–2 October 2017) was Minister of Planning in the cabinet appointed by the Interim Iraq Governing Council in September 2003 and in the Iraqi Interim Government. A Shia Muslim, al-Hafez was the Iraqi representative to the United Nations from 1978 to 1980; afterwards, he headed the Arab Economic Research Association in Cairo. He is associated with the Iraqi Independent Democrats.

He was elected to the Iraqi Council of Representatives in the Iraqi legislative election of December 2005 as part of the secular Iraqi National List. In May 2007 he announced he was withdrawing from the list to sit as an independent. He died on October 2, 2017.

Preceded by Coalition Provisional Authority	Minister of Planning; September 2003–May 2005	Succeeded by Barham Salih
