= Arsalan Baiz =

Iraqi Kurdish politician

Speaker of Kurdistan Parliament
- In office February 2012 – April 2014
- Preceded by: Kemal Kirkuki
- Succeeded by: Yousif Muhammed Sadiq

Personal details
- Born: 14 July 1950 (age 76)
- Party: Patriotic Union of Kurdistan

Arsalan Baiz (Kurdish: ئه‌رسه‌لان بایز, born 14 July 1950) is an Iraqi Kurdish politician of the Patriotic Union of Kurdistan.

Baiz was born in Erbil and graduated in Kurdish language from the University of Baghdad.

Baiz was made Speaker of the Parliament in February 2012, a role he retained until 2014.

Political offices
Preceded by Kamal Kirkuki	Speaker of the Iraqi Kurdistan Parliament; 2012–2014	Succeeded by Yousif Muhammed
