= Kemal Kirkuki =

Iraqi Kurdish politician

- کەمال کەرکووکی
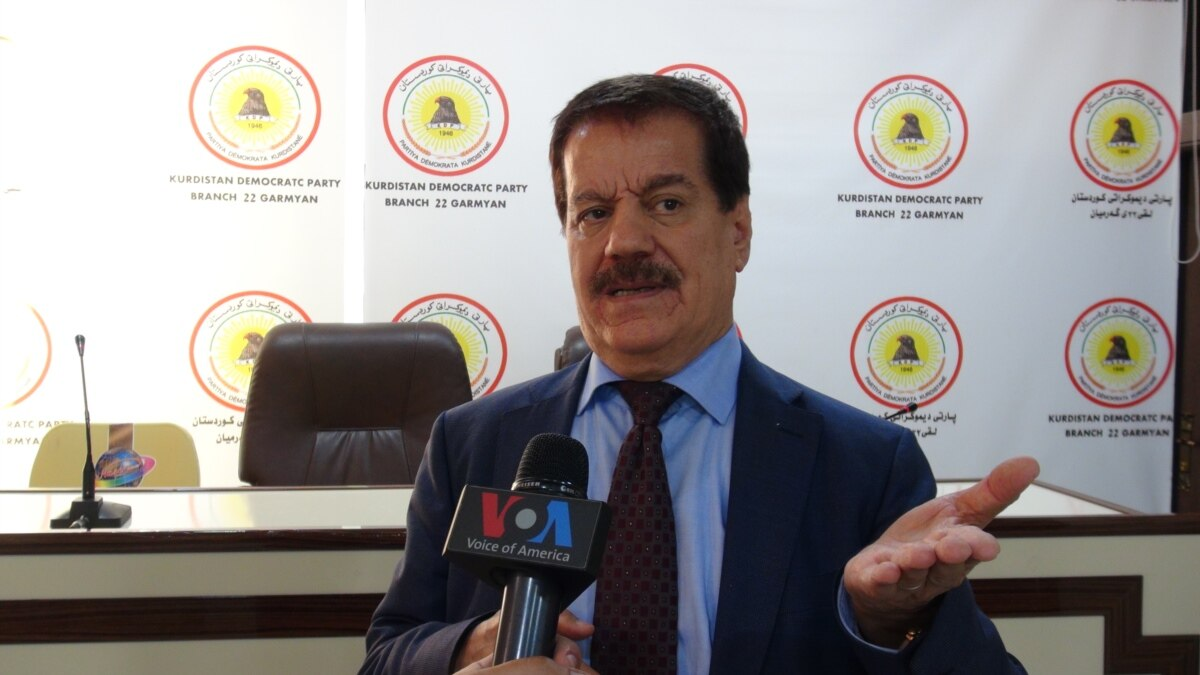

Speaker of Kurdistan Parliament
- In office 20 August 2009 – February 2012
- Preceded by: Adnan Mufti
- Succeeded by: Arsalan Baiz

Personal details
- Born: Mohammed Qadir Abdullah; 1954 (age 71–72) Kirkuk
- Party: Kurdistan Democratic Party

Mohammed Qadir Abdullah (Sorani Kurdish: محەممەد قادر عەبدوڵڵا) known by his nom-de-guerre as Kemal Kirkuki (Sorani Kurdish: کەمال کەرکووکی) (Born 1954) is an Iraqi Kurdish politician who served as the speaker of the Kurdistan Parliament from August 20, 2009 until February 2012. Kirkuki is also an active member of the Kurdistan Democratic Party.

Kirkuki was born as Mohammed Qadir Abdullah in Kirkuk in 1954, and studied in a medical college. He joined Peshmerga at the age of fourteen. He was a member of the political bureau of Kurdistan Democratic Party. He was elected Speaker of the Parliament from August 2009 to February 2012. Later, Kirkuki was a regional commander of Peshmerga forces against ISIS.
