= Roj Shaweis =

1st prime minister of Iraqi Kurdistan

- ڕۆژ شاوەیس
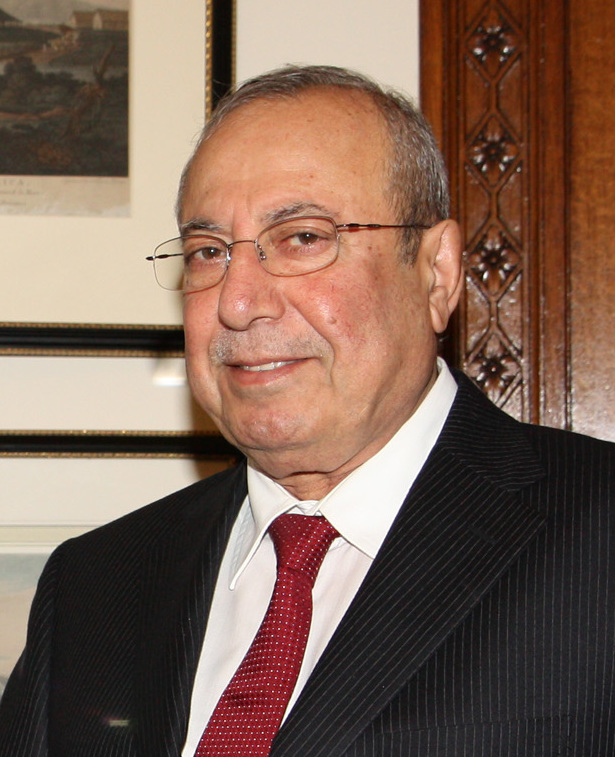
- Shaweis in 2011

1st Prime Minister of Kurdistan Region
- In office 26 September 1996 – 20 December 1999
- President: Massoud Barzani
- Preceded by: Position established
- Succeeded by: Nechirvan Barzani

Speaker of Kurdistan Parliament
- In office October 1999 – January 2003
- Preceded by: Jawhar Namiq
- Succeeded by: Kamal Fuad

Interim Vice President of Iraq
- In office 1 June 2004 – 7 April 2005 Serving with Ibrahim al-Jaafari
- President: Ghazi al-Yawer (interim)
- Preceded by: Taha Yassin Ramadan
- Succeeded by: Ghazi al-Yawer and Adil Abdul-Mahdi (Vice Presidents)

Deputy Prime Minister of Iraq
- In office 7 April 2005 – 20 May 2006
- Prime Minister: Ibrahim al-Jaafari; Nouri al-Maliki
- Preceded by: Barham Salih
- Succeeded by: Barham Salih
- In office 20 August 2009 – 8 September 2014 Serving with Rafi al-Issawi, Saleh al-Mutlaq and Hussain al-Shahristani
- Prime Minister: Nouri al-Maliki
- Preceded by: Barham Salih
- Succeeded by: Hoshyar Zebari
- In office 18 October 2014 – 10 August 2015 Serving with Saleh al-Mutlaq and Baha Araji
- Prime Minister: Haider al-Abadi
- Preceded by: Hoshyar Zebari

Personal details
- Born: 1947 Sulaymaniyah, Kurdistan Region, Kingdom of Iraq
- Died: 15 February 2021 (aged 73–74) Erbil, Kurdistan Region, Iraq
- Party: Kurdistan Democratic Party
- Spouse: Elke Shaweis
- Children: 3

Roj Nouri Shaweis (Sorani Kurdish: ڕۆژ نووری شاوەیس, Arabic: روز نوري شاويس; 1947 – 15 February 2021) was a Kurdish politician who served as the first Prime Minister of the KDP-controlled part of Kurdistan. After the invasion of Iraq that overthrew the Saddam Hussein regime, he served as one of Iraq's two vice presidents in the interim government established in 2004. Subsequently, he was a Deputy Prime Minister in the government headed by Ibrahim al-Jaafari and later held the same post under Nouri al-Maliki. He also served as Deputy Prime Minister under Haider Al-Abadi from 8 September 2014 to 9 August 2015. Previously, he served as speaker of the Iraqi Kurdistan National Assembly in the Kurdish autonomous region and was a member of the Kurdistan Democratic Party.

== Family and education ==
His father, Nouri Sadiq Shaweis, was one of the first Kurdish cabinet ministers in Iraq after the Iraqi–Kurdish Autonomy Agreement of 1970. His mother, Nahida Sheikh Salam, served as the first woman Member of the KDP Central Committee.

He was the eldest of eight brothers.

Shaweis earned a doctorate in engineering in Germany and returned to Iraq in 1975 to join the Kurdish resistance to Saddam Hussein, where he helped lead the Peshmerga forces in many key battles alongside Masoud Barzani.

Political offices
Preceded by Post Created	Prime Minister of KDP-controlled Kurdistan; 1996–1999	Succeeded by Nechervan Barzani
Preceded by Taha Yassin Ramadan	Interim Vice President of Iraq; Served alongside Ibrahim al-Jaafari; 2004–2005	Succeeded by Adil Abdul Mahdi and Ghazi al-Yawar as Vice Presidents
Preceded by Barham Salih (interim Deputy Prime Minister)	Deputy Prime Minister of Iraq; 2005–2006	Succeeded by Barham Salih
