= Mohammed Haji Mahmoud =

Iraqi politician

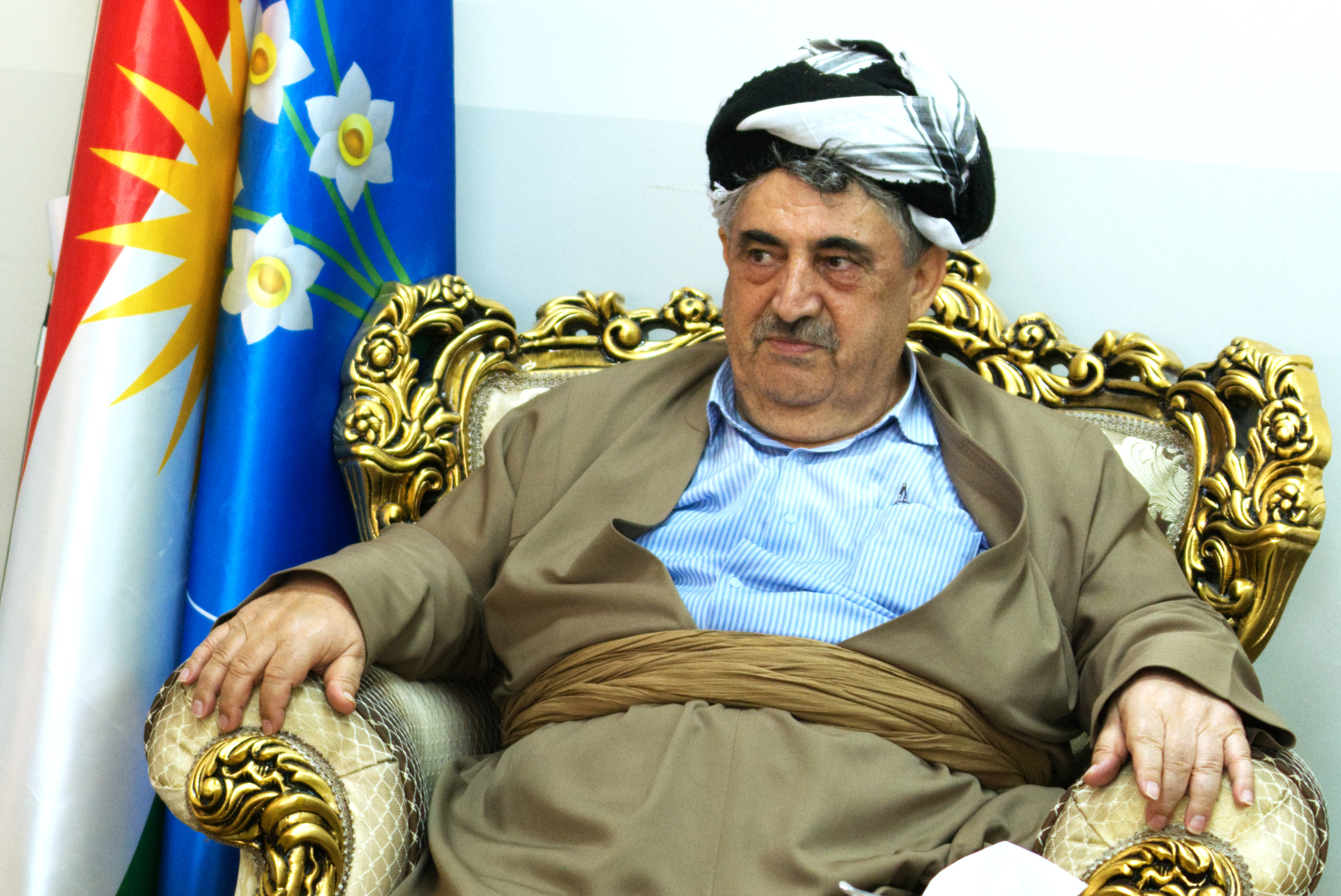
- Mahmoud in 2019

Leader of the Kurdistan Social Democratic Party

Personal details
- Born: 1953 (age 72–73) Khurmal, Halabja, Slemani, Kingdom of Iraq
- Party: Kurdistan Social Democratic Party

Military service
- Battles/wars: Iraqi-Kurdish conflict War against the Islamic State

Mohammed Haji Mahmoud (Sorani Kurdish: محەمەدی حاجی مەحمود) known as "Kaka Hama" born in 1953, Khurmal, Halabja, Slemani, Kingdom of Iraq is an Iraqi Kurdish politician. he is the leader of the Kurdistan Socialist Democratic Party. And has gained a reputation for bravery fighting against Saddam Hussein's forces in the 1980s. More recently, he has led a Peshmerga force in the fight against the Islamic State.

Mahmoud is politically aligned with Kurdistan Democratic Party leader Massoud Barzani.

In 2014 his son Atta Haji Mahmoud was killed in the village of Tal Ward, south of Kirkuk in a battle with the militant group ISIS.

Mahmoud stated in a talk at Cambridge University in 2016 that he hoped to see an independent Kurdistan "working closely" with a stabilised Iraqi state.

Mahmoud has said that issues between the Iraqi Kurdish parties are affected by the oil companies which each of them set up. "The Kurdistan Democratic Party, the Patriotic Union of Kurdistan, the Change Movement, the Kurdistan Islamic Union and the Kurdistan Islamic Group established five oil companies. They are also shareholders of oil. But their issues are about the amount which this [one] has less than the other."
