= Kurdistan Social Democratic Party (Iraq) =

Political party

Kurdistan Social Democratic Party حزبی سۆسیال دیموکراتی کوردستان
- Abbreviation: KSDP
- Leader: Mohammed Haji Mahmoud
- Founder: Mahmoud Othman; Resul Mamend; Adnan Mufti
- Founded: 1976
- Preceded by: Kurdistan Socialist Party - Iraq
- Paramilitary wing: KSDP Peshmerga
- Ideology: Kurdish nationalism Social democracy
- Political position: Centre-left
- International affiliation: Progressive Alliance
- Seats in the Council of Representatives of Iraq: 0 / 329
- Seats in the Kurdistan Region Parliament: 1 / 100

Website
- www.jamawarnews.com

The Kurdistan Social Democratic Party (Kurdish: حزبی سۆسیال دیموکراتی کوردستان, romanized: Hizbî Sosyal Dîmukratî Kurdistan, abbreviated as KSDP) is a political party in the Kurdistan Region. It was founded as Kurdistan Socialist Party - Iraq (Kurdish: حزبی سۆسیالیست کوردستان - عێراق, romanized: Hizbî Sosyalîst Kurdistan - Êraq, KSP-I). The first leader was Saleh Yousefi after 1981.

From 1979 to 1985, the KSDP was part of the short-lived alliance Kurdistan United Socialist Party (HSYK), which had included the Socialist Movement of Kurdistan and the two splinters of the South Kurdistan Movement; the HSYK birthed the Kurdistan Toilers' Party. The KSDP component of the alliance was split into two camps: the scientific socialist faction around Resul Mamend, and the social democratic faction around Saleh Yousefi and Mahmoud Othman. Prior to the 1992 Kurdistan Region parliamentary election, the KSDP created an electoral alliance with the Kurdish Socialist Party (PASOK). In August, the Kurdistan Popular Democratic Party joined the alliance, and the three founded the Kurdistan Unity Party (KUP). A faction led by Resul Mamend refused to join the alliance and instead joined the Patriotic Union of Kurdistan in December 1992, where Mamend was included as a member of the Political Bureau. The KUP joined the Kurdistan Democratic Party in August 1993.

A month later, a faction under Mohammed Haji Mahmoud broke away from the KDP again, re-establishing the KSP-I. The following year, it was renamed to Kurdistan Socialist Democratic Party (Kurdish: حزبی سۆسیالیست دیموکراتی کوردستان, romanized: Hizbî Sosyalîst Dîmukratî Kurdistan; Arabic: الحزب الاشتراكي الديمقراطي الكردستاني, romanized: Hizb al-Ishtiraki al-Dimuqrati al-Kurdistani). It had been known under this name until a recent name change, although the acronym KSDP stayed the same.

After 1992, the party was led by Mahmoud Othman. The KSDP is currently led by Mohammed Haji Mahmoud.

In the 2013 Kurdistan Region parliamentary election, the KSDP received 12,501 votes (0.6%) and won one seat in the Kurdistan National Assembly. For the 2024 Kurdistan Region parliamentary election, the party joined an electoral alliance together with the Kurdistan Communist Party – Iraq and the Kurdistan Toilers' Party in an alliance called the Kurdistan Region Coalition.

== Paramilitary wing ==
The Kurdistan Socialist Democratic Party has a paramilitary wing of Peshmerga soldiers under the direct command of party leader Mohammed Haji Mahmoud, whose nom de guerre is "Kaka Hama". The party's forces have fought in the Iraqi Civil War against the Islamic State of Iraq and the Levant (ISIL), mostly in the region south of Kirkuk. They also took part in the Battle of Mosul. Among the party's fighters killed in combat against ISIL was Mohammed Haji Mahmood's son Atta.

== Internal conflict ==
Since early 2022, there has been a developing rivalry between party leader Mohammed Haji Mahmoud and his brother Abdullah Haji Mahmoud. Abdullah was first an MP in the Kurdistan Region Parliament and has been the "Minister of Martyrs and Anfal Affairs" since 2019. He lost some influence in the party after a party congress in March 2023, where Mohammed's son, Rêbîn, replaced him in the office for public relations and replaced many staff associated with him.

In late January 2024, the rivalry reemerged over a dispute whose son would become president of the Baxtiyarî Sports Club in Silêmanî, with the situation escalating and shots being exchanged. On 14 February, Selah Elî, who was a close associate of Abdullah, was replaced with Husên Xelîfe as leader of Peshmerga affairs, an associate of Mohammed. During the tensions, Elî's son reportedly opened fire, which led to security forces intervening.

On 5 March, an assembly led by Mohammed decided to strip Abdullah of the position of deputy chairman, as well as his party membership, calling on him to return properties owned by the party. Abdullah rejected the decision, arguing that only a proper party congress could make such a decision. According to the news network Peregraf, the conflict between the brothers had been going on for two years.

On 4 April, clashes erupted after a property dispute between Mohammed and Abdullah. The house of Abdullah Haji Mahmoud's son in the village of Gulkhana, northwest of Halabja, was attacked by an armed group. Abdullah claimed that the group was made up of members of the KSDP, including his brother, and that the group fired at his house with RPGs. During the clashes, Abdullah's son was reportedly wounded, and a guard of the party leader, Mohammed, was killed. After the clashes, security forces were deployed to the village to control the situation.

== Election results ==
=== Council of Representatives elections ===
Election	Leader	Votes	%	Seats	+/–	Position	Government
2018	Mohammed Haji Mahmoud	6,151	0.06%	0 / 329	New	▲55th	Extra-parliamentary
2021	Mohammed Haji Mahmoud	8,221	0.09%	0 / 329	0	▼61st	Extra-parliamentary
2025	Mohammed Haji Mahmoud	7,100	0.06%	0 / 329	0	▲55th	Extra-parliamentary
