= Mahmoud Othman =

Iraqi Kurdish politician (born 1938)

Member of the Council of Representatives
- Incumbent
- Assumed office March 2005
- Constituency: Sulaymaniyah

Member of the National Assembly
- In office June 2004 – March 2005

Member of the Governing Council
- In office July 2003 – 28 June 2004

Personal details
- Born: Mahmoud Ali Othman; 1938 (age 87–88) Sulaymaniyah, Kingdom of Iraq
- Party: Independent
- Other political affiliations: Kurdistan Socialist Democratic Party; Kurdistan Democratic Party (1962 – 1980)
- Children: 8
- Education: University of Baghdad
- Occupation: Doctor and politician

Mahmoud Ali Othman (Note: Kurdish: مەحموود عەلی عوسمان; Arabic: محمود علي عثمان, romanized: Maḥmūd ʿAlī ʿUthmān) (born 1938) is an Iraqi Kurdish politician. He was a member of the Interim Iraq Governing Council created following the United States's 2003 invasion of Iraq. A Kurd and Sunni Muslim, Othman was a member of the Political Bureau of the Kurdistan Democratic Party (KDP). He later founded the Kurdish Socialist Party. He was involved in negotiations leading to the 1970 autonomy agreement with the Ba'ath Party. He later served as a member of the Iraqi National Assembly.

Othman was born in Sulaymaniyah in 1938. He became politically active during his youth. He completed a degree in medicine at the University of Baghdad, graduating with first-class honours. He has eight children.

Othman has been involved in Kurdish political movements advocating autonomy within Iraq. In later years, he has acted as an independent politician and commentator, frequently giving press interviews on Kurdish and Iraqi political affairs. He was a candidate in the 1992 Kurdistan regional elections. Since the late 2000s, he has taken on an advisory role in Kurdish political issues and has not been an active candidate in subsequent elections.

== Timeline ==
- 1954 - Joined the Kurdish Struggle
- 1962 - Became a member of the Kurdistan Democratic Party (KDP).
- 1968 - Became Mustafa Barzani's Deputy dealing with foreign affairs of the revolution.
- 1970 - Chief Negotiator in the agreement of ceasefire between the Kurdish region and the Ba'ath Party
- 1980 - He founded the Kurdish Socialist Party with Rasool Mahmend, Adel Murad and Adnan Al Mufti
- 1980 - Became Leader of the Kurdish Socialist Party
- 1992 - Ran in the Kurdistan Regional Elections.
- 1992 - Went into exile in the UK.
- 1995 - First return from exile to the Kurdish region.
- 2001 - Was top politician in peace talks between the Kurdistan Democratic Party (KDP) and the Patriotic Union Of Kurdistan (PUK)
- 2003 - Became member of the Interim Iraq Governing Council
- 2004 - Became member of Iraqi National Assembly.
- 2005 - Becomes head of the list of the Kurdistan Alliance in the forthcoming elections.
- 2006 - Elected member of Iraqi National Assembly.
- 2010 - Re-Elected member of Iraqi National Assembly for Al Sulaymaniyah Province
- 2010 - Leading MP to form the Kurdish coalition for Baghdad which consists of (Kurdistani List, Change List, Services & Reform List, Islamic Parties)
