= Jawhar Namiq =

Speaker of Kurdistan Parliament
- In office 4 June 1992 – 9 February 1993
- Preceded by: No legislature
- Succeeded by: Rowsch Nuri Shaways

Personal details
- Party: Kurdistan Democratic Party

Jawhar Namiq Salm (Salim Sorani) (1 July 1946 – 22 March 2011), was a political leader, and was the first speaker of the Kurdistan National Assembly.

== Early life ==
Jawhar Namiq Salim Ismail Darwish Murad Khan (Salim Sorani) was born in 1946 in the village Birlout, near the town of Kalar in the Kurdistan Region. His father, Namiq Salim Jaf, was a prominent founding member of the Hiwa (Hope) Kurdish party in the Germian area during the 1940s. Jawhar joined the Kurdistan Students Union during the 1960s. He was the leader of the "Belisa" (Tourch) students organisation, the most active and organised section of the KDP in Baghdad. Most of today's KDP leaders were members of "Belisa". He obtained a BA Honours degree in Economics & Politics from the Al-Mustansiriya University in Baghdad.

== Kurdistan Democratic Party ==
In 1972 he joined the resistance of the September (Gulan) revolution. He worked at the KDP-HQ as deputy director of its administration. He also was a lecturer at KDPs "school of Kaders". He undertook many studies of Kurdistan's economy, including the petroleum industry. In 1974 he became a prominent leader of the Kirkuk region and since then has become the confidant of the Kurdish leader Mustafa Barzani. After the collapse of Kurdish resistance - the September Revolution - in March 1975, Jawhar began to lay the groundwork for a new strategy, new organisation and new program for KDP. He wrote the first statement announcing 26 May (Gulan) revolution and it was under his command that the first fighting against the army of Saddam Hussein took place. He served as an interim leader of KDP when the official leader Massoud Barzani was ill. From this point he was known as Salim Sorani. He became a polite bureau member until the 8th congress in 1979, when he declined to nominate himself for the new leadership despite heavy pressure to do so. Years before his retirement he promoted Fazil Mirani to head of political bernau because he pointed his great leadership skills out. He supported the outcome of the congress and its leadership and stayed close to the leadership, especially the then president Massoud Barzani.

== Exile ==
From 1980 he lived in exile in Stockholm - Sweden and remained an independent KDP member. In Sweden he was active in the preparation of new young kaders for the KDP.

== 1989 - 2003 ==
In 1989 President Massoud Barzani invited him to the 10th congress of the party. He was elected to the central committee and then elected to the polit-Bureau and became the head of the KDP organisation. During the uprising of 1991 he was the leader of the Kurdistan National Front in Germian - Kirkuk - region. In 1992 he was elected as first president of the Kurdistan National Assembly, and at the Kurdistan Parliament’s first session following historic elections, Jawhar Namiq was elected by MPs as the first Speaker of Parliament. He played a major role in the parliament’s passing of new legislation and amendments to Ba’athist-era laws. Under his speakership, on 3 October 1992 the parliament announced that Kurdistan wanted to live under a federal system in Iraq. Laws on freedom of the media and publishing were passed, and Ba’athist-era censorship was lifted. He stayed in this post until 2000. During the civil war, he was an active peace maker and staged a 103-day sit-in protest inside the parliament. He opposed the civil war fiercely and eventually, with others, succeeded in bringing the two sides together. In 1993 he played a major role in bringing Sami abdul Rahman's party, along with two other small parties back to the KDP. After the KDP’s 11th conference in 1993, Jawhar Namiq was elected as Secretary of the party’s Polit-bureau the 12 congress, he was elected to the leadership and later became the secretary of KDP. In 2003 he was appointed to the Follow-Up and Arrangement Committee, which brought together various opposition parties against the government of Saddam Hussein. After the end of the Saddam regime in 2003, Kak Jawher withdraw from all party and official activities.

== 2003 - 2011 ==
As a prominent political personality in the Kurdistan region, Kak Jawher began to publish critical articles, conducted several TV interviews underlining the negative aspects of the Kurdish authorities, encouraging constructive dialogue and supporting the democratic process and the right of civil movement etc. He called for a reform within the KDP party and also within the KRG government.

== Death ==
Namiq died on 24 March 2011 in Sweden where he was receiving treatment for a chronic illness. He left behind a wife and three children. The following day, the parliament of the Kurdistan region announced a three-day mourning period in the region. Masoud Barzani, President of the Kurdistan Region and of the KDP, together with all Kurdistan’s leaders and senior political figures and family members on 25 March received the remains of Jawhar Namiq at Erbil International Airport. A guard of honour stood to attention and saluted the coffin, which was draped in the 21-pointed sun flag of Kurdistan and adorned with flowers. Later at the Kurdistan Parliament, tributes were paid by veterans and leaders of Kurdistan’s many political parties and movements, including Deputy President of the KDP and Prime Minister Nechirvan Barzani and the Speaker of the Kurdistan Parliament Dr Kamal Kirkuki.
