= Abid Mutlak al-Jubouri =

Iraqi politician (1940–2026)

- عبد مطلك الجبوري

Deputy Prime Minister

Personal details
- Born: 1 July 1940
- Died: 30 August 2026 (aged 86)

Abid Mutlak al-Jubouri (Arabic: عبد مطلك الجبوري; 1 July 1940 – 30 August 2026) was an Iraqi politician who was a Deputy Prime Minister in the Iraqi Transitional Government from 3 May 2005 to 20 May 2006. A Sunni Arab onetime major general in Saddam Hussein's army, he rose to prominence during the 1980–1988 Iran–Iraq War.

Jubouri died on 30 August 2026, at the age of 86.
