= Sulaimani Polytechnic University =

Public university in Sulaymaniyah, Iraq

Coordinates: 35.5368°N 45.4722°E

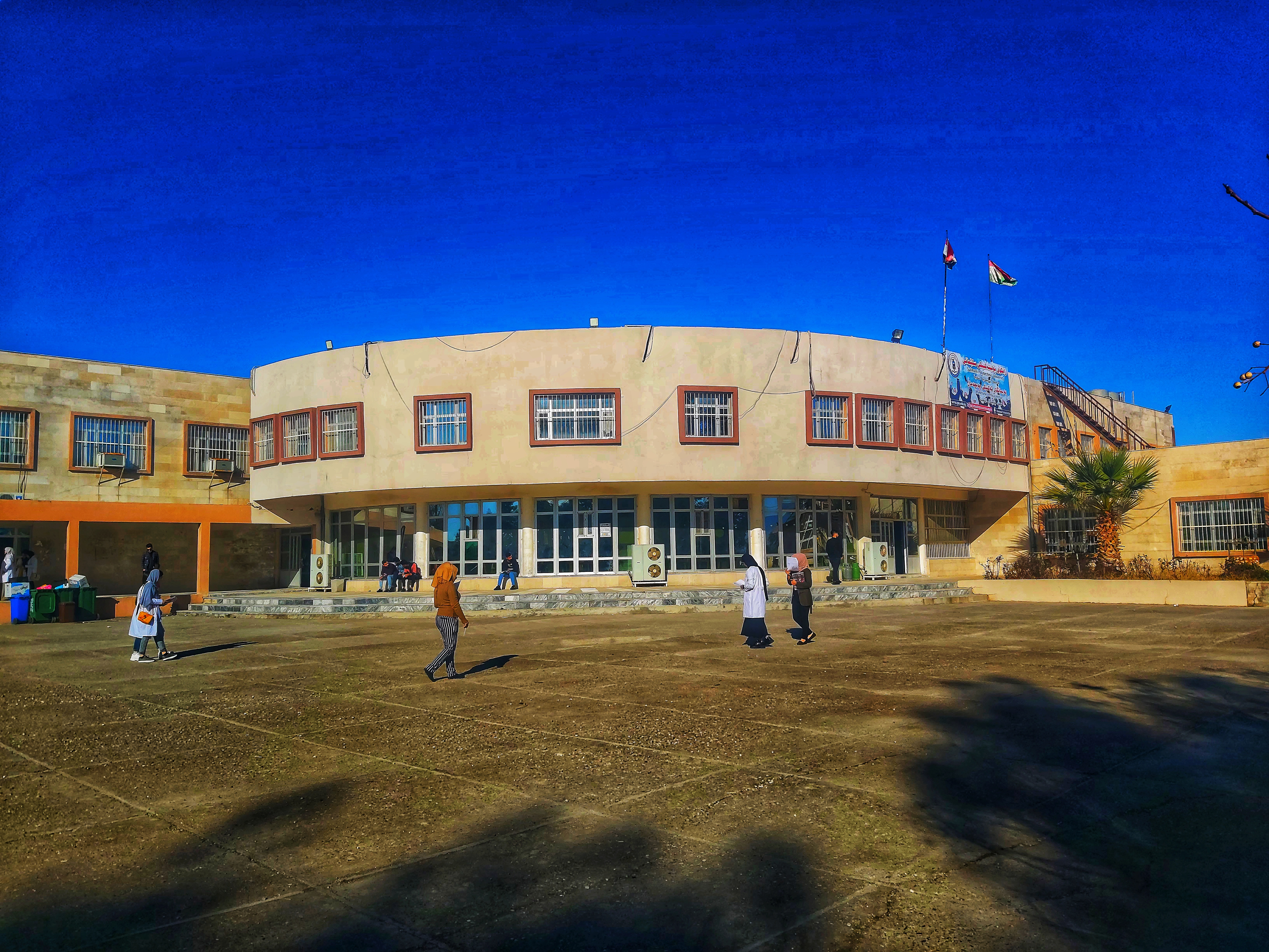
- Motto: From here it is possible
- Type: Public
- Established: 1996
- Location: Sulaymaniyah, Iraq
- Nickname: SPU
- Website: www.spu.edu.iq
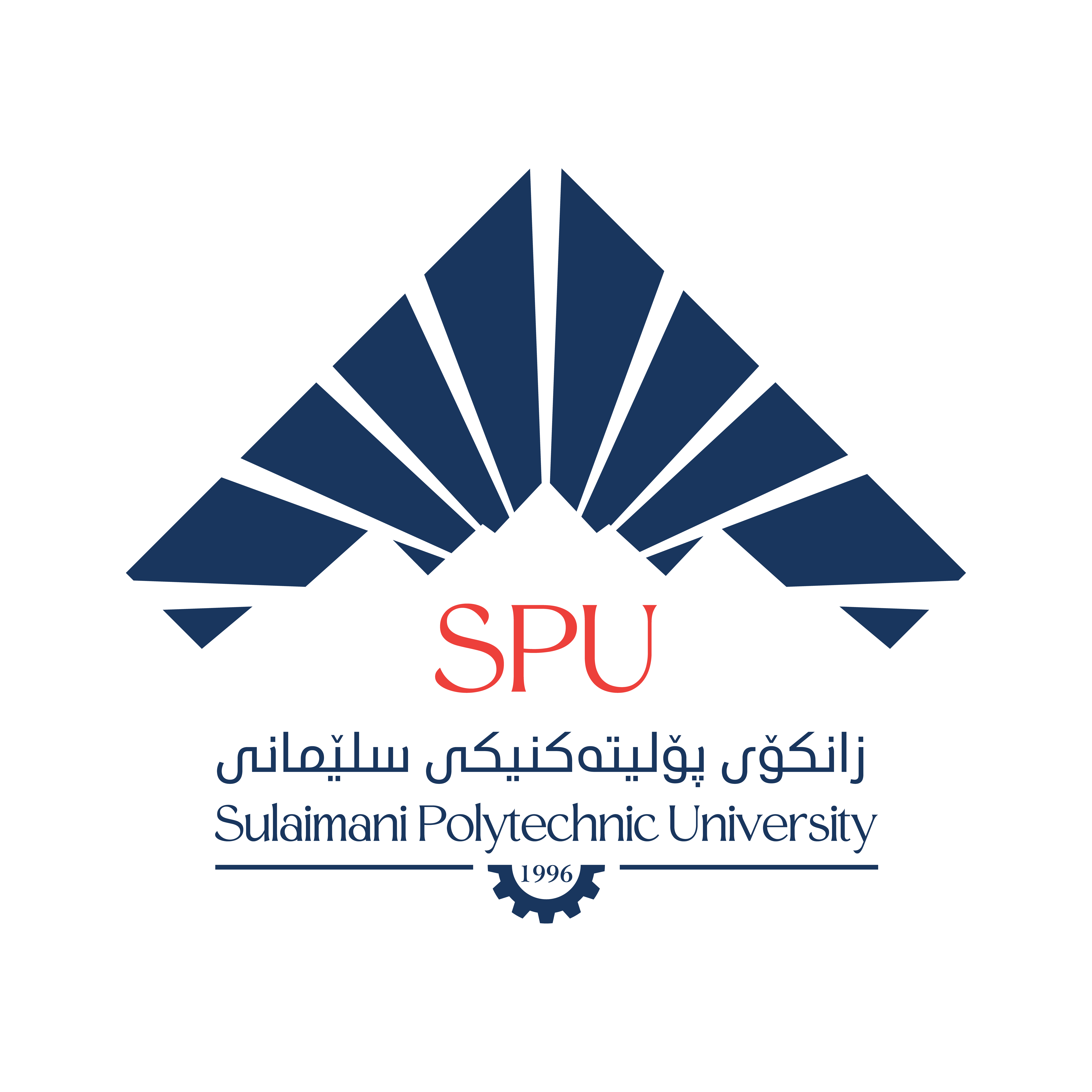

Sulaimani Polytechnic University (SPU) (in Kurdish: زانکۆی پۆلیتەکنیکی سلێمانی) is a public university and a member of International Association of Universities (IAU). It is located in the city of Sulaymaniyah, Qirga District in the Kurdistan Region of Iraq. It is one of the important scientific and cultural centers in the region. SPU was originally established in 1996 under the name Foundation of Technical Institutions (FTE). In 2003 its name was changed to Foundation of Technical Education Sulaimani (FTES).

== About ==
SPU currently comprises 13 institutes and colleges. The main campus is located in Sulaimani city; the others are in the towns of Dukan, Kalar, Halabja, Chamchamal, Darbandikhan DBK and Khanaqin. SPU currently has a total enrollment of more than 13,500 undergraduate students. The university offers a variety of major areas of studies including Engineering, Health and Medical Sciences, Agriculture, Computer Science, ICT and Business Administration leading to Technical Bachelor and Diploma degrees.

The main goal of its establishment was to administer the technical education in Kurdistan which is a major and important aspect in higher education. Another duty of SPU is to prepare experts and technical staff for the development of the society, government sector and the private sector, in addition to the administrative supervision of the institutes and technical colleges located within the boundaries of Sulaimani and Garmiyan.

Polytechnic system performed in many countries all over the world. The graduates of these colleges and institutes at SPU receive a technical diploma after two-year study course in technical institutes and a technical bachelor's degree after four-year in study for the technical colleges.

The study is mainly undertaken as full-time morning classes. However, due to increasing demand in terms of student numbers, evening courses were established in 2008 for the first time.

In academic year 2011/2012, the parallel study was introduced at SPU.

FTES was restructured to Sulaimani Polytechnic University in August 2012 by a decision from the Council of Ministers.

== See also ==
- List of universities in Iraq
