= Kurdistan Region Parliament =

Legislature of the Kurdistan region of Iraq

Kurdistan Regional Parliament برلمان اقليم كردستان پەرلەمانی كوردستان

Type
- Type: Unicameral

History
- Founded: 1992

Leadership
- Speaker of Parliament: Vala Fareed, Kurdistan Democratic Party since 4 November 2026
- Deputy Speaker of Parliament: Rami Noori, Independent since 4 November 2026

Structure
- Seats: 100
- Political groups: KDP (39); PUK (23); NGM (15); KIU (7); NSM (4); KJG (3); People's Front (2); KSDP (1); Gorran (1); Christian Quota (3); Turkmen Quota (2)

Elections
- Voting system: Open list proportional representation using Hare quota
- Last election: 20 October 2024
- Next election: To be decided

Meeting place
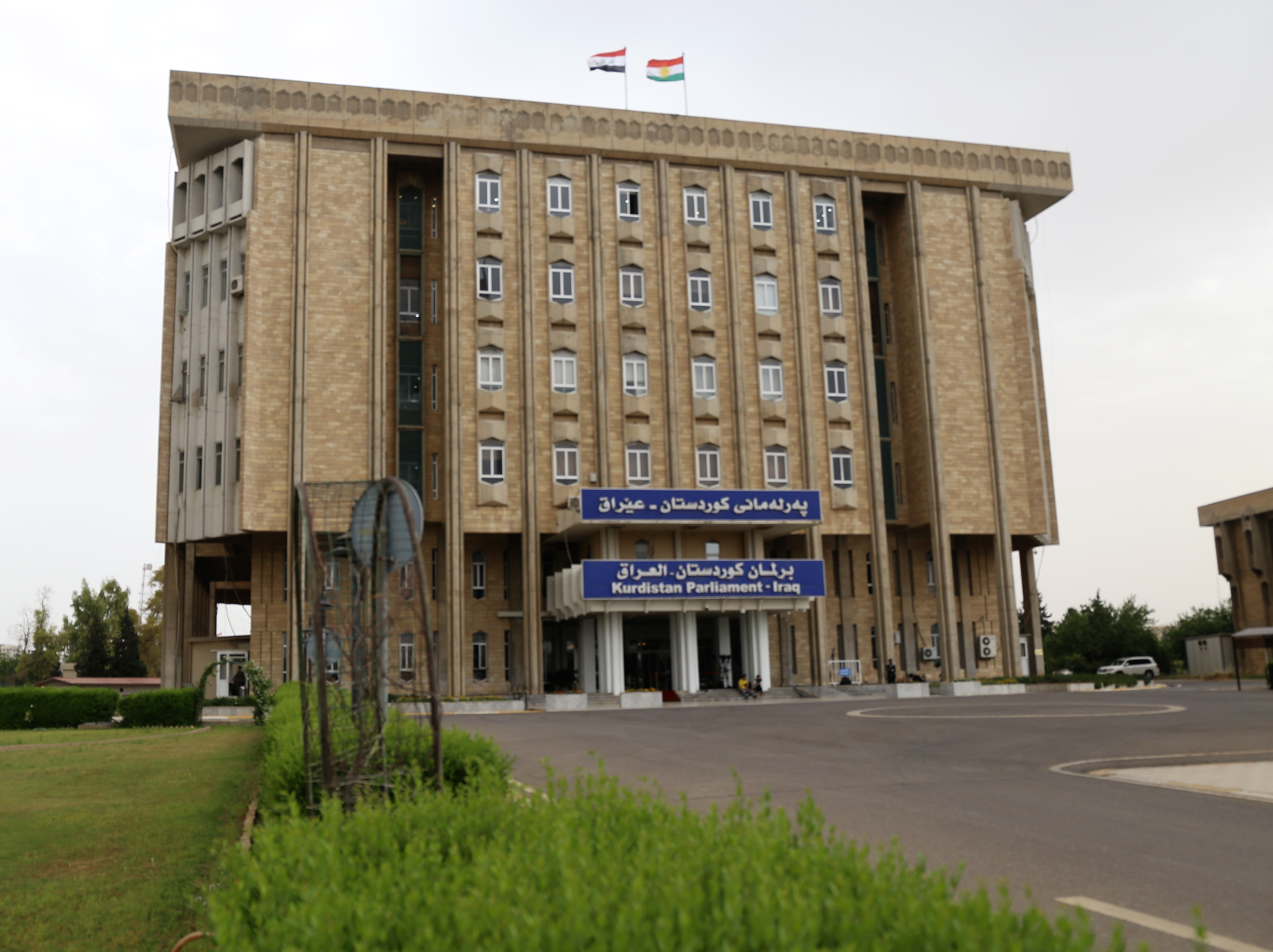
- KRG Parliament Building

Website
- Official website

The Kurdistan Regional Parliament, also known as Kurdistan Parliament – Iraq (Kurdish: پەرلەمانی كوردستان; Arabic: برلمان اقليم كردستان), or simply Perleman, is the parliament of the Kurdistan Region in Iraq. It comprises representatives from various parties, lists or slates elected every four years by the inhabitants of the Kurdistan Region, which the Kurdistan Regional Government currently governs. In 2009, an amendment was applied to the 1992 Kurdistan Election Law, changing the name of the body to the Kurdish Parliament from its previous name: the Kurdish National Assembly. In February 2024, the Federal Supreme Court of Iraq invalidated several articles of the election law and simultaneously amended it, decreasing the number of seats in the parliament from 110 to 100, among other structural changes.

The Parliament is a 100-member unicameral body in which 5 seats are reserved for non-Kurdish minority communities of the Kurdistan Region. The Parliament building is located in Erbil, the capital of the Kurdistan Region.

Sessions are held twice in a year, each covering four months. It is organized into committees focusing on certain areas, such as legal affairs, education and higher education, finance and economy, and culture. Legislative proposals and bills are initiated via the Regional Council of Ministries or by the endorsement of ten individual members of parliament.

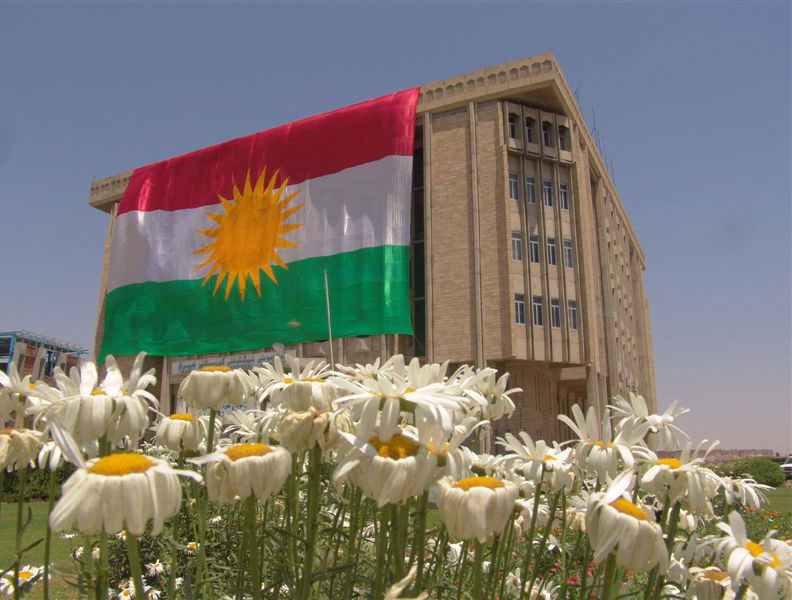
Raising the flag of Kurdistan on the parliament of Kurdistan

== Structure, functions, and founding principles ==
The parliament is the Kurdistan Region’s elected legislative body, consisting of one chamber. The IKP'S three main functions are to examine proposals for new laws, scrutinize government policy and administration, and debate major issues.

The IKP's founding principles are liberty, pluralism, accountability, openness, and the representation of all citizens of the Kurdistan Region.

== History of the Assembly ==
To protect civilians from attacks by Iraqi military forces following the 1991 Gulf War, the US, UK, and France initiated a no-fly zone above the 36th line of latitude, which cuts across Kurdistan. On the ground, a security zone was established by military forces from eleven countries. These no-fly and security zones strongly supported and encouraged refugees, including those who had left in the 1970s, to return to their homes.

In 1991, Saddam Hussein withdrew his forces and his administration, including the national flag, from parts of the Kurdistan Region. Compounding the hardship caused by an international UN embargo on Iraq, Saddam Hussein enforced an additional internal embargo on the region that stopped food and fuel supplies, disconnected electrical power. He prevented the movement of people to other parts of the country.

Faced with the administrative vacuum and double embargo, the Kurdistan Front, an alliance of diverse political groups in the Kurdistan Region, decided to hold a general election. Their goal was to establish an administration to meet the people's basic needs. The population also expressed a strong desire to choose its representatives. The election, held on 19 May 1992, was the first parliamentary election in the history of Iraq. Voter turnout was very high, and the elections were deemed to be free, fair, and democratic by international observers. After decades of dictatorship, the people in Kurdistan could vote for their representatives.

This regional election led to the formation of the first Kurdistan National Assembly (later Kurdistan Region Parliament) and the establishment of the Kurdistan Regional Government. The people of the Kurdistan Region decided to remain part of Iraq and to adopt and abide by all national laws except those that violate human and universal rights.

The Kurdistan National Assembly convened on 15 July 1992. Law No. 1, the first law passed by the assembly, established it as the Region’s legislature. In February 2024, the Federal Supreme Court of Iraq invalidated several articles of the law and amended it. The verdict set a legal precedent for superseding the Kurdistan Region Parliament, and arrogated to itself powers previously vested in the parliament. By amending the law, the court effectively acted on behalf of the parliament as the region’s legislative authority. Following the issuance of the verdict, Abdul Rahman Zibari, a Kurdish judge in the court, resigned in protest, saying the verdict “violates the constitutional rights of the Kurdistan Region, the principles of federalism, and the separation of powers enshrined in the Iraqi constitution.” The court subsequently issued a statement saying Zibari’s resignation would not affect the court’s work.

== Elections ==
=== 1992 elections ===
On 19 May 1992, 6 months after Kurds had gained their freedom, the first elections were held. Due to the 7% threshold, the only parties with a chance of winning seats in parliament were the KDP and the PUK. The election resulted in a narrow victory for the KDP, with 45% of the vote, gaining 51 seats, while the PUK, with 44% of the vote, gained 49 seats. However, due to allegations of election fraud, they divided the seats 50–50 and created a unity government. The government, however, collapsed, resulting in a civil war in 1994. The last parliamentary meeting was held in 1996. It resulted in the creation of two Kurdish states, a PUK-controlled state based in Silemani and a KDP-controlled state based in Erbil, both proclaiming themselves as legitimate rulers of Kurdistan.

=== 2005 elections ===
The primary goal of the 2005 elections was to end party-rule in the Kurdistan Region and unify the two major parties—the Kurdistan Democratic Party (KDP) and the Patriotic Union of Kurdistan (PUK)—who fought a civil war in the mid-1990s over territorial disputes and control of the Kurdistan Region. Previously, the region was divided by administrative provinces under the control of either the KDP or the PUK. In 2004, the two parties created one unified list or coalition called the Democratic Patriotic Alliance of Kurdistan, which included several smaller parties. Not surprisingly, the coalition received the majority of votes (an overwhelming 90%), allowing the KDP and PUK to divide key positions in government effectively. The coalition achieved 104 of the 111 seats in parliament.

In June 2012, the IKP held its first official meeting with Massoud Barzani as the elected president. After six long months, the IKP finally agreed on administration positions. In 2006, the government was selected with Nechervan Idris Barzani as prime minister. The parties also negotiated terms for the prime minister. Nechervan Barzani, who is a member of the KDP, was expected to serve two years and would be replaced with a PUK candidate in 2008.

Governorate elections were held in Iraq, in 2005, including in the three Kurdish provinces. The elections resulted in a KDP victory in Hewler and Dohuk with PUK a victory in Silemani. In total the PUK won the most votes in these 3 provinces together with a total of 765,544 votes (43.4%) however they won only 48 seats while the KDP with 741,483 votes (42%) won 62 seats. Other parties won only 4 seats in Kurdish provinces. Kurdish parties also won majorities in Nineveh and Kirkuk.

=== 2009 elections ===
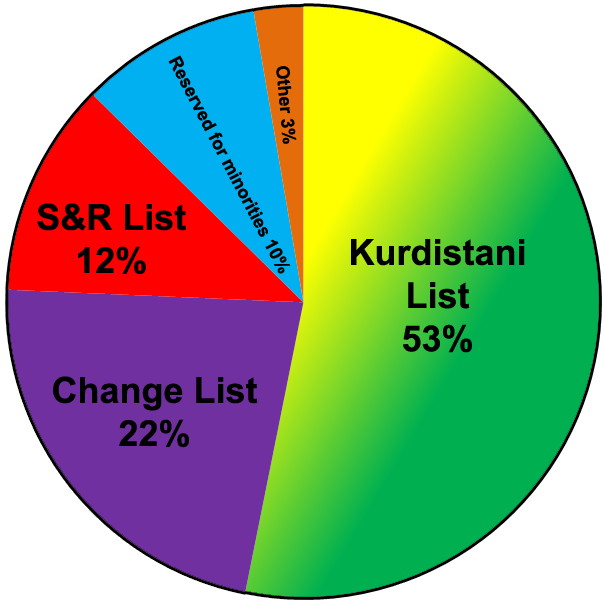
25 July 2009 election results

The latest parliamentary elections were held on 25 July 2009. Kurdistan List, a joint list of KDP and PUK, won the largest share of seats and was tasked to form the next government. Major opposition parties include the Change List and Reform List, with 25 and 13 seats, respectively. The new prime minister, Barham Salih of PUK, assumed office on 28 October 2009. Minority Turkmen have five seats, and Christians (Assyrians and Armenians) are represented with four seats. The KRG government comprises 19 ministries.

In 2005, Massoud Barzani was elected as President of Kurdistan Region by the parliament. In 2009, the KRG decided that the president would no longer be selected by parliament; instead, direct elections would occur. In the 2009 elections, President Barzani ran for re-election and faced a host of opposing candidates, including Halow Ibrahim Ahmed, Kamal Mirawdily, Ahmed Mohammed Rasul and Hussein Garmiyani. The election was a landslide victory for Barzani, getting approximately 70% of the votes. Kemal Mirawdily came second with 25%.

== Speakers of the National Assembly and the Parliament ==
Name	Took office	Left office	Party	Notes
Jawhar Namiq	4 June 1992	October 1999	KDP	
Rowsch Nuri Shaways	October 1999	January 2003	KDP	
Kamal Fuad	January 2003	March 2003	PUK	
Adnan Mufti	2004 – 30 January 2005	20 August 2009	PUK	
Kemal Kirkuki	20 August 2009	February 2012	KDP	
Arsalan Baiz	February 2012	April 2014	PUK	
Yousif Muhammed Sadiq	29 April 2014	February 2019	Gorran	
Vala Fareed	18 February 2019	11 July 2019	KDP	
Rewaz Fayeq	11 July 2019	2 July 2023	PUK	
Vala Fareed	4 November 2026	Incumbent	PDK	

== Structure of the Kurdistan Parliament ==
There are 100 seats in the Kurdistan Parliament (as stipulated in KNA Law No. 1 of 1992 amended by Federal Supreme Court of Iraq ruling No. 83 of 2024). Currently, women hold 39 seats. The legal requirement is that at least 30% of the parliamentarians are women (according to IKP Law No. 1, Article 22, amended in Article 10 of Law No. 47 for 2004, third amendment of Law No. 1 for 1992).

Five seats have been allocated to represent the Assyrian, Armenian, and Turkmen minority communities in the KRG-administered provinces.

== Powers of the Kurdistan National Assembly ==
As provided in the federal constitution of Iraq, the KNA has considerable power to debate and legislate on policy in a wide range of areas. It has several committees which work on the following areas:

- Agriculture and Irrigation
- Communication and Municipalities
- Culture
- Finance and Economic Affairs
- General and Higher Education
- Health and Social Affairs
- Home Affairs
- Housing and Reconstruction
- Human Rights
- Industry, Energy, and minerals
- Kurdistan Constitution
- Legal Affairs
- Peshmerga
- Ministry of Endowments and Religious Affairs
- Transport
- Women's rights

The KNA shares legislative power with the federal authorities in these areas, but priority is given to the KNA’s laws. In addition, under Article 121 of the Iraqi federal constitution, the KNA has the right to amend the application of Iraq-wide legislation that falls outside of the federal authorities’ exclusive powers.

== Landmark legislation passed by the Kurdistan National Assembly ==
The KNA has passed several laws contributing to the region’s social and economic progress. These include: passing a modern and open investment law; ¬ significantly increasing the prison sentence for those committing so-called honour killings, which were previously given minimum sentences. Other legislation and issues that the KNA is considering are: a petroleum law for the Kurdistan Region, which has been drafted and is being debated; ¬ a constitution for the Kurdistan Region; the KNA has established a committee to look into this and produce a draft; ¬ limits to or a ban on the practice of polygamy. The Kurdistan National Assembly members in the current parliament, elected on 30 January 2005, include one independent member and the others represent 14 different political parties, including Turkmen, Assyrian parties. Three members of the KNA are Yezidis, who belong to different political parties. [1] The formula for the allocation of seats is based on a first calculation using a simple quota (Hare quota), and subsequent calculations using the largest remainders. [2] These powers are granted in the federal constitution of Iraq, articles 114, 115, 117, 120, 121, 126 and 141. Members of the Kurdistan National Assembly, Independent Electoral Commission of Iraq Regulation 14/2005 on the KNA elections

== Historical composition ==
Summary of the 2013 election for the Kurdistan Parliament
Party	Seats
Regular seats
Kurdistan Democratic Party	38
Movement for Change	24
Patriotic Union of Kurdistan	18
Kurdistan Islamic Union	10
Islamic Group in Kurdistan	6
Islamic Movement of Kurdistan	1
Kurdistan Socialist Democratic Party	1
Kurdistan Communist Party – Iraq	1
Kurdistan Toilers' Party	1
Seats reserved for Turkmen
Turkmen Development List	2
Erbil Turkmen	1
Turkmen Change and Renewal	1
Iraqi Turkmen Front	1
Seats reserved for Assyrians
Assyrian Democratic Movement	2
Chaldean Syriac Assyrian Popular Council	2
Sons of Mesopotamia	1
Seat reserved for Armenians
Berunt Nissan Markos	1

== See also ==
- Koma Civakên Kurdistan
- Kurdish Supreme Committee
- Kurdish National Council
- Legislative Council of the Autonomous Kurdistan Region
