= Emblem of the Kurdistan Region =

Emblem of the Kurdistan Regional Government
- Armiger: Kurdistan Regional Government
- Adopted: 1992
- Use: Kurdistan Region

The Emblem of Kurdistan (Kurdish: نیشانی ھەرێمی کوردستان, romanized: Nîşana Herêma Kurdistanê) is a Republican Eagle holding a sun on his wings and is officially used by the Kurdistan Region.

== See also ==
- Eagle of Saladin
