= Government of the Kurdistan Region =

Semi-autonomous government in Iraq

Kurdistan Regional Government
- حکومه‌تی هه‌رێمی کوردستان; Ĥikumetî Herêmî Kurdistan حكومة إقليم كردستان; Ḥukūmat ʾIqlīm Kurdistān
- Emblem of the Kurdistan Regional Government

Overview
- Established: 1992
- State: Kurdistan Region
- Leader: President Nechirvan Barzani; Masrour Barzani (Prime Minister)
- Main organ: Cabinet
- Ministries: 19
- Responsible to: Kurdistan Region Parliament
- Headquarters: Erbil, Kurdistan Region
- Website: https://gov.krd/english/

The Kurdistan Regional Government (Note: Kurdish: حکوومەتی هەرێمی کوردستان Hikûmetî Herêmî Kurdistan; Arabic: حكومة إقليم كردستان, Ḥukūmat ʾIqlīm Kurdistān) (KRG) is the official executive body of the semi-autonomous Kurdistan Region in northern Iraq.

The cabinet is selected by the majority party or list who also select the prime minister of the Iraqi Kurdish polity. The president is directly elected by the electorate of the region and is the head of the cabinet and chief of state who delegates executive powers to the cabinet. The prime minister is traditionally the head of the legislative body but also shares executive powers with the president. The President of Kurdistan Region is also the commander-in-chief of the Peshmerga.

== 2014 ==
From mid-2013 to mid-2014, the KRG "built up their own defenses by creating a security belt stretching more than 1,000 km (600 miles) from the Iranian border all the way to Syria – skirting around Mosul, a city of 2 million people they appear[ed] to have no intention of fighting for." In August 2014, ISIL attacked the Kurds.

On 1 July 2014, Masoud Barzani announced that "Iraq's Kurds will hold an independence referendum within months."

== 2017 ==
In September, the 2017 Kurdistan Region independence referendum was held regarding Kurdish independence from Iraq. 92% of Iraqi Kurds participating in the referendum voted in favor of independence. The referendum was regarded as illegal by the federal government in Baghdad, and on 6 November, Iraq's Supreme Federal Court ruled that no Iraqi province was allowed to secede in order to preserve the unity of Iraq.

On 14 November, the KRG announced it would respect the Supreme Federal Court's ruling, stating that "this decision must become a basis for starting an inclusive national dialogue between (Kurdish authorities in) Erbil and Baghdad to resolve all disputes".

== Cabinet ==
Portfolio	Incumbent	Faction	Since
Prime Minister	Masrour Barzani	KDP	2019
Deputy Prime Minister	Qubad Talabani	PUK	2019
Minister of Justice	Farsat Ahmad Abdullah	KDP	2019
Minister of Peshmerga Affairs	Shoresh Ismail Abdulla	PUK	2019
Minister of Interior	Rebar Ahmed Khalid	KDP	2019
Minister of Finance and Economy	Awat Janab Noori	KDP	2019
Minister of Health	Saman Hussein Muhammad	KDP	2019
Minister of Education	Alan Hama Saeed Salih	KDP	2019
Minister of Housing and Reconstruction	Dana Abdulkareem Hamasalih	KDP	2019
Minister of Municipalities and Tourism	Sasan Othman Awni Habib	KDP	2019
Minister of Higher Education	Aram Mohammad Qadir	PUK	2019
Minister of Planning	Dara Rashid Mahmud	KDP	2019
Minister of Labour and Social Affairs	Kwestan Mohamad Abdulla Maarouf	PUK	2019
Minister of Youth and Culture	Mohammad Said Ali	KDP	2019
Minister of Martyrs and Anfal Affairs	Abdullah Mahmood Mohammad	PUK	2019
Minister of Agriculture and Water Resources	Begard Talabani	PUK	2019
Minister of Trade and Industry	Kamal Muslim Saeed	KDP	2019
Minister of Transport and Communications	Ano Jawhar Abdulmaseeh Abdoka	KDP	2019
Minister of Endowment and Religious Affairs	Pshtiwan Sadq Abdullah	KDP	2019
Minister of Electricity	Kamal Mohammad Salih Khalil	PUK	2019

== See also ==
- Kurdish Supreme Committee
- A Modern History of the Kurds by David McDowall
