= Results of the 2014 Iraqi parliamentary election (Assyrian seats) =

The 2014 parliamentary elections in Iraq included a vote for five seats reserved for the Assyrian community. Prior to the elections, the Assyrian Democratic Movement (ADM) held three seats and Chaldean Syriac Assyrian Popular Council (CSAPC) two. A total of 84 Assyrians competed in 9 different lists.

The elections saw ADM lose one seat, CSAPC retain its two seats, and the Iraqi Communist Party win a single seat as part of the Civil Democratic Alliance list. A total of 105,109 votes were cast.

ADM was given the Baghdad and Kirkuk seats, electing members Yonadam Kanna and Sargon Lazar. However, Sargon gave up his seat to fellow party member Imad Youkhana Yaqo, in order for him to named a minister by Iraqi Prime Minister Nuri Almaliki. That never happened. The original Kirkuk seat was to be given to the Popular Council, along with Nineveh, electing Khalis Isho and Raed Ishaq. However, Khalis was immediately disqualified after the De-Ba'athification process labeled him as a former Baath Party member. Popular Council was compensated by getting the Duhok seat, by giving it to reigning parliament member Luis Caro Bandar. ICP was given the Erbil seats, and was received by Fares Jajo. Five months after the elections, in September 2014, Jajo was named the Minister of Science and Technology, leaving his seat to Joseph Sylawa, who had only received 216 votes.

== Results ==
Party/list	Votes	%	Seats	+/–
Rafidain List (Assyrian Democratic Movement)	24,353	23.17	2	▼1
Chaldean Syriac Assyrian Popular Council List	23,781	22.63	2	0
Civil Democratic Alliance (Iraqi Communist Party)	12,626	12.01	1	▲1
Sons of Mesopotamia	8,109	7.71	0	
Beth Nahren Patriotic Union	7,408	7.05	0	
Babylon List	6,672	6.35	0	
Sorayie National Alliance	5,401	5.14	0	
Ur Nationalist List (Chaldean Democratic Union Party)	5,162	4.91	0	
Shlama Entity (Kurdistan Democratic Party)	4,742	4.51	0	
Total	105,109	100	5	0
Source: Ishtar TV

=== By candidate ===
Winner
Disqualified
Winner but eventually gave up seat to pursuit ministry position

Candidate	Governorate	Party/List	Votes	Notes
Yonadam Kanna	Baghdad	ADM	9,023	Iraq parliament member since 2005, Secretary-General (President) of ADM since 1982
Khalis Isho Estevo	Kirkuk	Popular Council	6,120	Iraqi parliament member since 2010
Raed Ishak Matti	Nineveh	Popular Council	4,929	Syriac Orthodox from Bartella
Sargon Lazar	Kirkuk	ADM	3,908	Iraqi Environment Minister and Yonadam Kanna's nephew
Shamiram Mrogl Odisho	Kirkuk	ICP	3,820	
Yohana Yousif Toma	Nineveh	Sorayie National Alliance	2,680	
Aswan Salim Sadiq	Baghdad	Babylon List	2,379	
Estevo Jameel Shaman	Nineveh	Popular Council	2,293	
Luis Caro Bandar	Duhok	Popular Council	2,179	Iraqi parliament member since 2010
Imad Youkhana Yaqo	Kirkuk	ADM	2,026	Iraqi parliament member since 2010, Deputy Secretary-General (vice-president) of ADM
Yousif Isho Warda	Kirkuk	Sons of Mesopotamia	1,655	
Ablahad Afraim Sawa	Duhok	Chaldean Democratic Union Party	1,519	
Odisho Malko Gorgis	Duhok	Beth Nahren Patriotic Union	1,500	
Samir Jackmen Sheto	Erbil	Shlama Entity	1,329	
Najib Mansoor Noh	Nineveh	ADM	1,324	
Polis Shamoon Ishak	Erbil	Popular Council	1,240	President of Chaldean Cultural Society in Ankawa
Rahwan Yohana Aoudish	Duhok	Popular Council	1,220	
Farid Yacob Elia	Duhok	ADM	1,173	
Lara Yousif Ishaq	Nineveh	Shlama Entity	1,056	
Kaldo Ramzi Hermiz	Erbil	ADM	1,036	
Asam Behnam Matti	Nineveh	Beth Nahren Patriotic Union	1,010	
Lala Yohanis Hawokim	Duhok	Chaldean Democratic Union Party	984	
Ad Yousif Ishaq	Erbil	Sons of Mesopotamia	879	
Samir Abed Hermiz	Nineveh	ICP	846	
Yousif Yacob Matti	Nineveh	Beth Nahren Patriotic Union	774	
Fathel Toma Bani	Baghdad	Sons of Mesopotamia	621	
Basma Habeeb Aziz	Erbil	Popular Council	592	
Khalida Sleman Elias	Nineveh	ICP	565	
Baida Khathir Behnam	Nineveh	Babylon List	551	
Basma Zarqo Yacob	Duhok	Sons of Mesopotamia	543	
Admon Yohana Ishaq	Duhok	Sons of Mesopotamia	525	
Raed Jirjis Oraha	Duhok	Shlama Entity	506	
Mikhael Khoshaba Michael	Baghdad	Beth Nahren Patriotic Union	479	
Karim Hanna Gorgis	Kirkuk	ICP	450	
Rostom Shamon Shaya	Nineveh	ADM	438	
Mansoor Sadiq Yousif	Duhok	Babylon List	438	
Evan Jani Goreal	Erbil	Beth Nahren Patriotic Union	433	
Azad Hermiz Nissan	Duhok	ICP	416	
Fares Sami Yousif	Baghdad	ICP	412	
Fares Yousif Jajo	Erbil	ICP	408	
Suzan Khoshaba Beto	Duhok	ADM	359	
Nora Salem Bolis	Kirkuk	Sons of Mesopotamia	358	
Susen Sabah Matti	Nineveh	Sons of Mesopotamia	355	
Waleem Khamo Warda	Baghdad	Sorayie National Alliance	345	
Matti Jajo Younis	Baghdad	ICP	334	
Treez Marogi Isho	Baghdad	Popular Council	329	
Sherzad Yousif Danial	Erbil	Sons of Mesopotamia	324	
Emad Adwar Abhalahad	Nineveh	Sons of Mesopotamia	314	
Habeeb Yousif Sadeq	Baghdad	Babylon List	307	
Fadiya Saida Elias	Kirkuk	Beth Nahren Patriotic Union	298	
Amira Toma Hermiz	Kirkuk	Popular Council	268	
Adnan Franso Polis	Duhok	Sorayie National Alliance	263	
Jinan Sliwa Yokhana	Erbil	ADM	253	
Hikmat Dawooud Jabo	Kirkuk	Chaldean Democratic Union Party	252	
Faten Ghanem Khalil	Baghdad	Sons of Mesopotamia	247	
Yohana Markos Yousif	Duhok	Beth Nahren Patriotic Union	246	
Adeb Najeb Razoqi	Nineveh	Babylon List	245	
Sliwa Shamam Maqo	Nineveh	Chaldean Democratic Union Party	232	
Amir Jamil Hermiz	Baghdad	Beth Nahren Patriotic Union	230	
Joseph Sylawa Sebi	Erbil	ICP	216	
