= Syriac Assembly Movement =

Syriac Assembly Movement حركة تجمع السريان ܙܘܥܐ ܕܟܢܘܫܝܐ ܣܘܪ̈ܝܝܐ
- President: John Adwar Hadaya
- Founder: Isho Majid Hadaya
- Founded: January 15, 2004
- Headquarters: Bakhdida
- Ideology: Assyrian/Syriac interests
- National affiliation: Christian Alliance

Website
- Archived 2013-07-03 at the Wayback Machine

The Syriac Assembly Movement (Arabic: حركة تجمع السريان; Syriac: ܙܘܥܐ ܕܟܢܘܫܝܐ ܣܘܪ̈ܝܝܐ), formerly known as the Syriac Independent Gathering Movement (Arabic: حركة التجمع السرياني المستقل), is an Iraqi Assyrian political party. Formed in January 2004 by Isho Majid Hadaya in Bakhdida as an affiliate to the Dawronoye, the party has participated in Assyrian politics in Iraq since the 2003 U.S. invasion. On several occasions, SAM cooperated with other political parties, mainly on issues related to the protection of ethnic and religious rights of minority groups in Iraq. As of 2026, the party remains active as part of the Christian Alliance led by Ano Abdoka.

Like other Iraqi Assyrian political parties, particularly those of sectarian affiliation, the Syriac Assembly Movement was noted for its affiliations with the Kurdistan Democratic Party. Support for the party primarily came from KDP funding, with the party's electoral win in the 2009 Iraqi governorate elections being attributed to its participation on a KDP-backed list. Additionally, the party's participation in the 2018 Iraqi parliamentary election was met with scrutiny from Assyrians cross-denominationally due to its sectarian views and its endorsement from the Syriac Catholic Church. The bulk of the party's members comprised Syriac Catholics, with no involvement from the Syriac Orthodox Church or any of its adherents in Iraq. Today, the Syriac Assembly Movement is considered to be a proxy political party.

== History ==
The Syriac Assembly Movement was formed on January 15, 2004 by Isho Majid Hadaya; Hadaya was born in Bakhdida in 1954, and in the wake of the 2003 invasion of Iraq, had aspired to create a political party representing Aramean identity, with the support of religious institutions. Hadaya's position was that different names in the community represented one people, settling on the tri-name designation as a compromise due to internal conflicts. The party was formed in Bakhdida as an affiliate of the Dawronoye.

In 2007, the party joined the Chaldean Syriac Assyrian Popular Council as a member organization. The party signed a joint declaration of objectives alongside 13 other political parties and organizations in Ankawa in 2011. That same year, Anwar Matti Hadaya became the party's president by unanimous decision of their first conference, and the "Independent" in the name was removed. In 2012, the party received a visit by Iraqi-Assyrian parliamentarian Luis Caro Bandar, who was a member of the Chaldean Syriac Assyrian Popular Council. They also met with the Assyrian Democratic Movement and the Beth Nahrin Patriotic Union in Bartella the same year. After the fall of Mosul to ISIS, the party issued a condemnation of the violence and made a public appeal to the Federal government of Iraq and the Government of the Kurdistan Region for a restoration in security.

In 2016, SAM was a signatory alongside other Assyrian political parties on a joint statement calling for the unification of Assyrian militias for the purpose of security in the Nineveh Plains. The following year, the party continued its collaboration through "The March Agreement", calling for the creation of a Nineveh Plain province with international monitoring and guarantees for security. In June, the party was one of seven Assyrian political parties that participated in a conference in Brussels titled "A Future for Christians in Iraq", which advocated for the recognition of Assyrian victimization as genocide and for political autonomy. That same year, then-president of the party Anwar Matti Hadaya passed away. Aside from leading the party, he had also been part of the KDP-led Nineveh Provincial Council. The party has since been led by Hadaya's son, John Adwar Hadaya, who took over his seat on the Nineveh Provincial Council.

=== Killing of Isho Majid Hadaya ===
On November 22, 2006, Isho Majid Hadaya was assassinated as he was leaving the party's headquarters in Bakhdida. Sources noted that on October 31, he had submitted a proposal to the Council of Representatives of Iraq that called for the creation of an Assyrian autonomous region in the country; the assassination was considered a direct response to this request. Hadaya had reportedly never traveled with bodyguards, and the assassination occurred after his presence on a Kurdish network calling for a Christian protective force of Assyrian/Chaldean areas.

In the immediate aftermath, the family of Hadaya's wife fled to Jordan in hopes of joining his wife's daughter in the United States. The assassination was condemned by Albert Jan Maat of the European Parliament. It is speculated that the Kurdistan Democratic Party was affiliated with the murder in hopes of annexing the regions of the Nineveh Plain; Swedish-Assyrian journalist Nuri Kino wrote in 2009 that Hadaya's assassins were "a Kurdish death squad that belonged to the Kurdish Democratic Party and the Kurdistan Patriotic Union." Years after his death, Hadaya was commemorated annually in November by the party and his family.

== Electoral history ==
In the December 2005 Iraqi parliamentary election, the party ran as part of the "Nahrain National Coalition". In the 2009 Iraqi governorate elections, the party ran as part of the KDP-backed Ishtar Patriotic List, placing forward Sa'ad Tanyos Jajji for the Nineveh governorate. The party won the seat as part of the list, replacing the seat formerly held by the National Rafidain List and the Assyrian Democratic Movement. During the 2013 Kurdistan Region parliamentary election, Anwar Hadaya participated as a candidate of the "Chaldean Syriac Assyrian Alliance List" (524).

The party also participated in the 2018 Iraqi parliamentary election, under List 131. The list was three members short of a full ten, and received the lowest number of votes out of all seven Assyrian lists (3,838 votes), winning no seats. The party and List 131 received an endorsement from the Syriac Catholic Church after several meetings with clergymen and political leaders in 2018. According to the Assyrian Policy Institute, meetings were called after the church expressed concerns over the disorganization of candidates from Bakhdida, while some locals believed that the church felt the number of candidates divided the Syriac Catholic vote and lessened the church's influence.

In the 2021 Iraqi parliamentary election, the party was signed onto the Hammurabi Coalition of Ano Abdoka alongside the Chaldean National Congress and the Chaldean Democratic Union Party, which participated in the Nineveh, Erbil, Kirkuk, Duhok, and Baghdad governorates. After the election, the party signed a joint statement calling for a manual recount of votes for the Christian quota after electoral manipulation by the Babylon Movement was alleged to have occurred. In 2024, following the revocation of minority seats in the Kurdistan Region Parliament, the party boycotted that year's Kurdistan Region parliamentary election, calling the ruling an "attack on coexistence and a violation of the constitution." Soon after, SAM signed a joint statement alongside other parties choosing to boycott the election. Two months later, the party was signed onto a political alliance titled the "Christian Alliance", announced by Ano Abdoka. The party participated in the 2025 Iraqi parliamentary election as part of the alliance; around this time, the party submitted a memorandum to Iraqi government officials as part of a coalition of Christian political/social organizations, outlining demands for protection and political inclusion.

== Criticism ==
In a report by the Assyrian Policy Institute, the group stated that the Syriac Assembly Movement was being co-opted as a part of the sectarian divides of the Assyrian community to undermine their political representation. After its founding, the party started receiving funding from the KDP, and was part of the KDP-led Nineveh Provincial Council for the Nineveh governorate. The party's position regarding an Assyrian/Christian autonomous region was for it to be under the jurisdiction of the Government of the Kurdistan Region.

API's report noted that the party's 2018 candidates were composed exclusively of Syriac Catholics, with the SOC and its parishioners having no involvement with or support for the list. The Syriac Catholic Church's decision to endorse the party in 2018 was met with immense backlash, including from residents of Bakhdida, and the endorsement did not result in larger voting mobilization. During this time, members and supporters of the party were alleged to have espoused anti-Assyrian sectarian rhetoric.

=== Affiliation with Salwan Momika ===
Before the 2018 Iraqi parliamentary election, journalist Max Joseph wrote a Medium article about Assyrian participation in the elections, and mentioned the Syriac Assembly Movement. SAM's participation in the elections had Salwan Momika as its key figure; Momika, an Assyrian originally from the Nineveh governorate, fled to Germany in 2017 after a power struggle with Rayan al-Kildani of the Babylon Movement. Joseph had noted that the party held no seats in the federal parliament, and that the "Syriac" vote was entirely divided between existing parties instead of sect affiliation. Attempts to search into Momika revealed little except a Facebook page, with pictures of him holding the sectarian Aramean flag. His involvement with the party, as well as his past political involvement in Iraq, was rediscovered after public controversy surrounding him and his role in the 2023 Quran burnings in Sweden.

== Bibliography ==
- Al-Jaberi, Sattar Jabbar (25 April 2025). "نتائج االنتخابات البرلمانية العراقية 2021: دراسة تحليلية" [The results of the Iraqi parliamentary elections 2021: An analytical study]. Journal of the Faculty of Law and Political Science (in Arabic) (28): 257–279. ISSN 2664-4088.
- BarAbraham, Abdulmesih (2018). "Safeguarding the Cross: Emergence of Christian Militias in Iraq and Syria". Middle Eastern Christians and Europe: Historical Legacies and Present Challenges. Wien: LIT Verlag. pp. 217–238. ISBN 978-3-643-91023-3.
- Hanna, Reine; Barber, Matthew (25 September 2017). Erasing Assyrians: How the KRG Abuses Human Rights, Undermines Democracy, and Conquers Minority Homelands (PDF) (Report). Assyrian Confederation of Europe. p. 40.
- Hanna, Reine; Joseph, Max (27 November 2018). Iraq's Stolen Election: How Assyrian Representation Became Assyrian Repression (PDF) (Report). Assyrian Policy Institute.
- Hanish, Shak (October 27, 2011). "Autonomy for Ethnic Minorities in Iraq: The Chaldo-Assyrian Case". Digest of Middle East Studies. 20 (2). Wiley: 171. doi:10.1111/j.1949-3606.2011.00090.x.
- Knuppe, Austin (22 November 2022). "The Civilians' Dilemma: How Religious and Ethnic Minorities Survived the Islamic State Occupation of Northern Iraq". The Journal of the Middle East and Africa. 14 (1): 37–67. doi:10.1080/21520844.2022.2128001.
- Kruczek, Gregory (March 10, 2021). "Christian (Second-Order) Minorities and the Struggle for the Homeland: The Assyrian Democratic Movement in Iraq and the Nineveh Plains Protection Units". The Journal of the Middle East and Africa. 12 (1): 93–121. doi:10.1080/21520844.2021.1886521.
- Lalik, Krzysztof (2018). "Ethnic and Religious Factors of Chaldo-Assyrian Identity in an Interface with the Kurds in Iraqi Kurdistan". Rediscovering Kurdistan's Cultures and Identities: The Call of the Cricket. Cham: Springer. pp. 213–257. ISBN 978-3-319-93088-6.
- Teule, Herman G. B. (2012). "Christians in Iraq: An Analysis of Some Recent Political Developments" (PDF). Der Islam. 88 (1): 179–198. doi:10.1515/islam-2011-0010.
