= Ishtar Patriotic List =

Ishtar Patriotic List قائمة عشتار الوطنية
- Founded: 2008
- Ideology: Assyrian interests Factions: Assyrian nationalism Populism; Conservatism

The Ishtar Patriotic List (Arabic: قائمة عشتار الوطنية) was an Assyrian political list that was formed to run in the 2009 Iraqi governorate elections. The list's biggest party was the Chaldean Syriac Assyrian Popular Council, a KDP-funded political party founded in 2007.

After their participation in the 2009 elections, the Ishtar List was retrospectively regarded as part of the Kurdish Regional Government's attempts to exert further influence in the Nineveh Plains, with the list displacing the seats of the Rafidain List and the Assyrian Democratic Movement. The list only participated in the 2009 elections.

== Electoral history ==
The Ishtar Patriotic List was first launched in late 2008, and was announced to be participating in the Iraqi elections from Erbil.

In the 2009 Iraqi governorate elections, the Ishtar List was backed by Sarkis Aghajan Mamendo, an Assyrian minister in the KRG. Assyrians were previously urged to participate in that year's elections by the parties represented, due to the events of the Iraq War and the subsequent persecution against the community during this time. The list was composed of the following parties and candidates:

- Chaldean Syriac Assyrian Popular Council (CSAPC)
- Bet Nahrain Democratic Party (BNDP)
- Chaldean National Congress (CNC)
- Beth Nahrin Patriotic Union (PUBN)
- Syriac Assembly Movement (than known as the Syriac Independent Gathering Movement)
- Notables of Qaraqosh
- Chaldean Cultural Society
- For Nineveh Governorate: Sa'ad Tanyos Jajji (SIGM)
- For Baghdad Governorate: Giwargis Esho Sada (BNDP)

The list won the reserved Assyrian seats in both Baghdad and Nineveh, electing both of the candidates who ran for the election.

== Criticism ==
Upon the conclusion of the elections, it was reported that a number of Assyrians had been fired from their jobs due to not having voted for the Ishtar List. Three Assyrians in particular, two of whom were guards and the other a janitor, had complained that they were fired by the KRG-funded Council for Christian Affairs and had been called traitors for voting for the Al-Rafidain List.

Assyrians had also accused the list of having won its votes by pressuring voters. A report by the Assyria Council of Europe around the time of the elections details that the people behind the list had been actively attempting to buy votes, as well as threaten economic sanctions. In Bakhdida, certain militia members attempted to stop members of the ADM from campaigning for Al-Rafidain through intimidations and beatings. Threats were also made to the people in the town, warning families that they would be displaced and having student transportation to the University of Mosul suspended if votes weren't directed towards the Ishtar List. Afram Yakoub, who wrote the report and was an election observer, had even experienced a run-in with a militia, which he suspected had to do with his investigations of the corruption of the Ishtar List in Bakhdida.

Yonadam Kanna and the ADM filed complaints to Iraq authorities following the election due to the list's affiliation with militias in the Nineveh Plains. In a WikiLeaks article from July 2009, Kanna as well as Ablahad Afraim Sawa complained about the list serving the interests of the KDP as a proxy, and engaging in electoral fraud to win elections.

In a 2018 report from the Assyrian Policy Institute, the group criticized the Ishtar Patriotic List for acting as a Kurdish proxy during the elections, and for allowing sectarian parties such as the Syriac Assembly Movement to win in the elections. The group also criticized what they described as a generic report from the KRG representation to the UK, describing how the seemingly anti-KRG ADM won less votes than the Ishtar List, indicating popular support despite previous allegations of fraud.

== See also ==
- Politics of Iraq
- Assyrian politics in Iraq
