= Chaldean National Congress =

Former Iraqi political party

Chaldean National Congress ܡܲܘܬܒܼܵܐ ܐܘܡܬܲܢܵܝܐ ܟܲܠܕܵܝܐ
- Abbreviation: CNC
- President: Janan Jabbar
- Founder: Dhia Putros, Ghassan Hanna Shathaya
- Founded: April 29, 2002
- Ideology: Chaldean separatism/nationalism
- National affiliation: Christian Alliance

Website
- Archived 2010-03-05 at the Wayback Machine

The Chaldean National Congress (Syriac: ܡܲܘܬܒܼܵܐ ܐܘܡܬܲܢܵܝܐ ܟܲܠܕܵܝܐ; Arabic: الجلس القومي الكلداني), also known as the Chaldean National Council, is an Iraqi Assyrian political party. The party was founded in 2002 in the United States, and was announced in early 2003 by Chaldean Catholic bishop Sarhad Yawsip Jammo. It has participated in Assyrian politics in Iraq since the 2003 invasion, although it has had little to no success in elections. As of 2026, the party is still active as part of the Christian Alliance led by Ano Abdoka.

The CNC is notable for being one of the first political organizations to promote Chaldean identity and separatism. The party's formation was in response to the lack of uniquely Chaldean voices in the leadup to the Iraq War, and aimed to mobilize the broader community into policy and politics. However, their advocacy for Chaldean separatism was met with heavy scrutiny from Assyrians cross-denominationally, including Chaldo-Assyrians. The party is also noted for its affiliation with the Kurdistan Democratic Party (KDP), where they received the majority of its support through funding and voting manipulation, and has since been considered a proxy party. The CNC failed to achieve greater mobilization among the Chaldo-Assyrian community, with its cofounder Ghassan Hanna Shathaya suggesting its failures reflected the sectarian nature of Chaldean identity as a whole.

== History and activities ==
The Chaldean National Congress was formed on April 29, 2002 in the United States, under the leadership of Dhia Putros and Ghassan Hanna Shathaya. The formation of the party was announced at a political rally by Sarhad Yawsip Jammo, a Chaldean Catholic bishop based in San Diego, in early January 2003. Jammo became a leading supporter of the party after its formation in order to mobilize Chaldean political involvement.

The messaging of the party was to advocate for unity within the homeland and diaspora, as well as to raise awareness of Chaldean history and resist the effects of Arabization. From its formation, the party held a position of advocating for the inclusion of Chaldean Catholics in the emerging government of Iraq following the U.S. invasion, albeit in the form of declaring them a distinct ethnicity from Assyrians. These views were similarly shared by Shathaya, who although tried to consolidate Chaldeans and Assyrians as one ethnic group, continued to categorically reject a unifying ethnic background by noting the demographic changes between the two groups. Leaders of the party also rejected the compromise "Chaldo-Assyrian" label proposed.

In July 2003, the organization of the party's Baghdad branch, which had opened a month prior, was chosen, being led by Fouad Bodagh. Around the same time, Shathaya had been vocal about wanting Chaldean representation in the forthcoming Council of Representatives of Iraq, anxious about the possibility of a Shiite theocracy. The former executive director of the party was Joseph Kassab, who was also president of the party in Michigan.

In 2009, the Australian branch of the party supported a proposal to establish a memorial to the Assyrian genocide in Fairfield, New South Wales. In 2012, Putros resigned from his position as secretary to join the Human Rights Commission of Iraqi Kurdistan as a chairman, beginning his position in 2013. The personnel of the commission were said to have lacked human rights experience, owing their positions to party affiliation. In 2016, the CNC was a signatory alongside other Assyrian political parties on a joint statement calling for the unification of Assyrian militias for the purpose of security in the Nineveh Plains. The following year, the party continued its collaboration through "The March Agreement", calling for the creation of a Nineveh Plain province with international monitoring and guarantees for security. In June, the party was one of seven Assyrian political parties that participated in a conference in Brussels titled "A Future for Christians in Iraq", which advocated for the recognition of Assyrian victimization as genocide and for political autonomy. The party's leader at the time was Sameer Azzo Dawood Kozel. In 2025, the party received a delegation from the Syriac Heritage Museum in celebration of its 23rd anniversary.

== Electoral history ==
The CNC was initially scheduled to participate in the January 2005 Iraqi parliamentary election, but ended up dropping from the race. The party ran as part of a list with other KDP affiliated parties during the December 2005 Iraqi parliamentary election. The party joined the Chaldean Syriac Assyrian Popular Council when it was still an umbrella organization, but later left to run independently in elections; the CNC also opposed the CSA appellation that the council employed.

During the 2009 Kurdistan Region parliamentary election, the party ran as part of a "Unified Chaldean List" alongside the Chaldean Democratic Union Party; candidates for the list emphasized the separation of Chaldean identity as a distinct recognition in the Kurdistan Region constitution. The list failed to win any seats. Additionally, the party won no seats in the 2009 Iraqi governorate elections, where it ran as part of the Ishtar Patriotic List. In the 2010 Iraqi parliamentary election, the party received 6,608 votes across all governorates, landing them behind the Chaldean Syriac Assyrian Popular Council and the Rafidain List in terms of number of votes. The party also contested the elections on a list separate from the CDP; however, they failed to win any seats.

During the 2013 Kurdistan Region parliamentary election, the party ran as part of a political association of Assyrian/Christian organizations, where they submitted candidate Janan Jabbar to participate; he received the lowest number of votes among all candidates on the list. By the time that Putros had left his position in the party, he had not succeeded in winning any previous elections in Iraq. In the 2018 Iraqi parliamentary election, the party ran alongside the CDP and the CCC-backed Chaldean League as part of the "Chaldean Coalition". The coalition received 14,188 votes in the election, with one seat being allocated to Hoshyar Yalda in Erbil. The party was stated to have put forward two candidates for the Coalition. The party ran as part of a "National Unity" alliance in the 2018 Kurdistan Region parliamentary election.

In the 2021 Iraqi parliamentary election, the party was signed onto the Hammurabi Coalition of Ano Abdoka alongside the Syriac Assembly Movement and the Chaldean Democratic Union Party, which participated in the Nineveh, Erbil, Kirkuk, Duhok, and Baghdad governorates. After the election, the party signed a joint statement calling for a manual recount of votes for the Christian quota after electoral manipulation by the Babylon Movement was alleged to have occurred. In 2024, following the revocation of minority seats in the Kurdistan Region Parliament, the party boycotted that year's Kurdistan Region parliamentary election, calling the ruling an "attack on coexistence and a violation of the constitution." Two months later, the party was signed onto a political alliance titled the "Christian Alliance", announced by Ano Abdoka. The party participated in the 2025 Iraqi parliamentary election as part of the alliance.

== Criticisms ==
From its founding, the CNC received heavy criticism. Sarhad Jammo's involvement prompted concerns from The Holy See, as they believed the formation of the party was not only suspicious, but that it would threaten the ideals of Pro Oriente and the Common Christological Declaration between the Chaldean Catholic Church and the Assyrian Church of the East. The formation of the party also received criticism from the Assyrian community and members of the CCC, where its announcement, as well as statements made by Bishop Jammo, were not well received. The Assyrian Democratic Movement has also criticized the CNC and other Chaldean political parties formed after the U.S. invasion, writing a statement which noted that the membership of these parties were very few in number, and they hadn't actively addressed the continuous demographic changes that Assyrians were facing from the violence of the conflict.

The CNC was also noted for its affiliations with the Kurdistan Democratic Party. A report by the Assyrian Policy Institute noted that during the 2009 Kurdistan Region parliamentary elections in Ankawa, the "Unified Chaldean List" only received just over 200 votes. The report also noted that the party received KDP funding through the Chaldean Syriac Assyrian Popular Council, and that its victory as part of the Chaldean Coalition in the 2018 elections was due to voting manipulation from the KDP. The party's position regarding an Assyrian/Christian autonomous region was for it to be under the jurisdiction of the Government of the Kurdistan Region.

On August 31, 2017, the party released a criticism of a speech by then-patriarch Louis Raphael I Sako on the ankawa.com website, accusing him of interfering the Chaldean Catholic Church with their political matters. In response, Sako branded organizations such as the CNC as those who had been previously harming Christian communities in Iraq, asserting that the group had unrealistic viewpoints about the future of the Nineveh Plains, and that the CNC had not contributed substantively to securing the decimated and vulnerable Christian presence there. Sako stated that the criticisms were as of the result of inner party divisions, and that "some use the Chaldean name for personal interests."

== Legacy ==
The CNC is notable for being one of the first political organizations to espouse a unique Chaldean identity. The party emerged around the beginning of the Iraq War as part of increasing efforts for political organizing, and its formation was motivated by the awareness of a lack of Chaldean voices in the war's leadup. Criticisms against Jammo's Chaldean nationalist advocacy were cited by the party as strengthening the merits of their cause, and population sizes would also be cited by them as assertions of Chaldean ethnicity against Assyrian inclusion.

The party was among many secular political organizations in competition for leadership of Iraq's Christian community, with rivals such as the Assyrian Democratic Movement and the Bet-Nahrain Democratic Party. The CNC itself was largely unable to gain wider attention, as it failed to present viable alternatives due to its lack of structure and its newness. In a retrospective interview, Shathaya stated that the weaknesses of the CNC, as well as other Chaldean political organizations, reflected the sectarian nature of Chaldean identity as a whole, and for that reason, it would never properly emerge as an ethnic identity due to its religious foundation.

== Bibliography ==
- Al-Jaberi, Sattar Jabbar (April 25, 2025). "نتائج االنتخابات البرلمانية العراقية 2021: دراسة تحليلية" [The results of the Iraqi parliamentary elections 2021: An analytical study]. Journal of the Faculty of Law and Political Science (in Arabic) (28): 257–279. ISSN 2664-4088.
- BarAbraham, Abdulmesih (2018). "Safeguarding the Cross: Emergence of Christian Militias in Iraq and Syria". Middle Eastern Christians and Europe: Historical Legacies and Present Challenges. Wien: LIT Verlag. pp. 217–238. ISBN 9783643910233.
- Hanish, Shak (March 16, 2010) [Spring 2008]. "The Chaldean Assyrian Syriac People of Iraq: An Ethnic Identity Problem". Digest of Middle East Studies. 17 (1). University of Wisconsin-Milwaukee: 32–47. doi:10.1111/j.1949-3606.2008.tb00145.x. ISSN 1060-4367.
- Hanish, Shak (October 27, 2011). "Autonomy for Ethnic Minorities in Iraq: The Chaldo-Assyrian Case". Digest of Middle East Studies. 20 (2). Wiley: 171. doi:10.1111/j.1949-3606.2011.00090.x.
- Hanna, Reine; Barber, Matthew (September 25, 2017). Erasing Assyrians: How the KRG Abuses Human Rights, Undermines Democracy, and Conquers Minority Homelands (PDF) (Report). Assyrian Confederation of Europe.
- Golpashin, Elvin Envieh (Fall 2021). ISIS and the Assyrians: A Narrative Study of the Psychological Impacts of Intergenerational Trauma, Continuous Atrocity, and Collective Victimhood on the Assyrians (PDF) (Report).
- Hanna, Reine; Joseph, Max (November 27, 2018). Iraq's Stolen Election: How Assyrian Representation Became Assyrian Repression (PDF) (Report). Assyrian Policy Institute.
- Hanoosh, Yasmeen (Fall 2016). "Minority Identities Before and After Iraq: The Making of the Modern Assyrian and Chaldean Appellations". The Arab Studies Journal. 24 (2). Portland State University: Arab Studies Institute. JSTOR 44742878 – via JSTOR.
- Hughes, Erin (June 29, 2016). An American atra? Boundaries of diasporic nation-building amongst Assyrians and Chaldeans in the United States (PhD thesis). The University of Edinburgh.
- Knuppe, Austin (November 22, 2022). "The Civilians' Dilemma: How Religious and Ethnic Minorities Survived the Islamic State Occupation of Northern Iraq". The Journal of the Middle East and Africa. 14 (1): 37–67. doi:10.1080/21520844.2022.2128001.
- Kruczek, Gregory (March 10, 2021). "Christian (Second-Order) Minorities and the Struggle for the Homeland: The Assyrian Democratic Movement in Iraq and the Nineveh Plains Protection Units". The Journal of the Middle East and Africa. 12 (1): 93–121. doi:10.1080/21520844.2021.1886521.
- Teule, Herman G. B. (2012). "Christians in Iraq: An Analysis of Some Recent Political Developments" (PDF). Der Islam. 88 (1): 179–198. doi:10.1515/islam-2011-0010. hdl:2066/101464. S2CID 156389791.
