= Assyrian politics in Iraq =

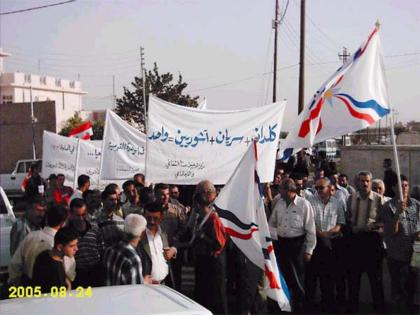
Assyrians in Bakhdida protesting the Constitution of Iraq resolution in 2005.

Assyrian politics in Iraq have been taking many different turns since the US invasion of the country in 2003. Today, there are many different Assyrian political parties in Iraq. The main Assyrian party that came out from the 2005 elections was the Assyrian Democratic Movement. However, Sarkis Aghajan began to challenge its power beginning in 2006 with the opening of Ishtar TV and the KDP-affiliated Chaldean Syriac Assyrian Popular Council.

As of 2025, owing to continuous violence and political marginalization, Assyrians no longer have proper political representation in Iraq. Many of the seats that are reserved for the community have since been hijacked by the Kurdistan Democratic Party and Babylon Movement under the leadership of Rayan al-Kildani.

== 1992 Kurdistan Region general election ==
On May 19, 1992, elections were held for the Kurdistan National Assembly (KNA,) the parliament of the Kurdistan Region in Iraq. At the time, the National Assembly had 105 seats. The parties representing the Assyrian community competed in a closed list guaranteeing that there would be five Assyrian seats in the KNA. There were four Assyrian lists in the elections:

- Assyrian Democratic Movement
- Kurdistan Christian Unity of Sarkis Aghajan
- Democratic Christians
- Chaldo-Ashur Communist Party

Results

	ADM	KCU	DC	KAD
Dohuk	5,555	1,841	181	241
Erbil	900	880	347	1,855
Sulemani	83	36	9	38
Darbandikhan (parts of Kirkuk)	4	-	-	-
Total	6,543; 54%	2,757; 23%	537; 5%	2,134; 18%

A minimum of 2,400 votes was required to win a seat. ADM won four seats and one was won by the Kurdistan Christian Unity. The names of those elected into the parliament:

- Yonadam Kanna (ADM)
- Shamil Benyamin (ADM)
- Francis Yousif Shaba † (ADM)
- Akram Ashur Odisho (ADM)
- Sarkis Aghajan (KCU)

Francis Youif was assassinated on June 1, 1993, in Dohuk. Experts regarded that several parties that participated in the election, namely Aghajan's KCU, were proxies for bigger Kurdish parties, with each party being controlled by a different organization.

== January 2005 Iraqi parliamentary election ==
A general election was held on 30 January 2005 to elect a temporary 275-member Council of Representatives of Iraq. It was the first time in the history of Iraq (outside of KRG-areas) that Assyrian political parties had been allowed to be part of the electoral system. In the elections, there were three different Assyrian lists;

- National Rafidain List (204) - Yonadam Kanna

Assyrian Democratic Movement

- Assyrian National Assembly (139)

Assyrian National Congress
Bet-Nahrain Democratic Party of Sargon Dadesho

- Bet-Nahrain Democratic Coalition (148)

Beth Nahren Patriotic Union
Syriac Independent Gathering Movement

Chaldean National Congress was initially part of list 204, but ended up dropping off before the election. Chaldean Democratic Union Party (CDUP), Assyrian Patriotic Party (APP) and Bet Nahrain Democratic Party (BNDP) of Romeo Hakkari joined the Kurdistani list (130). Before the elections, Minas Ibrahim of the Democratic Christian Party was kidnapped in Mosul, but was released a month later without ransom.

	Rafidain 204	ANA 139	Bet-Nahrain 148
Anbar	10	1	4
Arbil	958	106	217
Babil	104	72	101
Baghdad	7,430	1,210	1,472
Basra	120	153	179
Diyala	219	114	56
Dohuk	4,165	155	137
Karbala	44	57	75
Kirkuk	978	599	389
Missan	15	29	29
Muthanna	10	22	18
Najaf	56	59	63
Ninawa	3,346	97	302
Qadissiya	38	57	48
Salahadin	10	18	31
Sulaymani	99	39	174
Thiqar	68	101	92
Wasit	47	32	27
Out-of-country voting	18,538	4,198	727
Total	36,255	7,119	4,141

In all, six Assyrians were elected to the parliament. National Rafidain list got the minimum required votes for a seat in the parliament and it was given to Yonadam Kanna (ADM.) Other Assyrians that were elected into the parliament include Goriel Mineso Khamis (BNDP), Nuri Potrus 'Atto, Ablahad Afraim Sawa (CDUP) and Jacklin Qosin Zomaya (APP) all under the Kurdistani list (130.) Wijdan Michael was elected under Iyad Allawi's secular list.

== 2005 Iraqi governorate elections ==
On the same day, Iraq held a local governorate elections in all 18 governorates. Assyrian political parties participitated in 4 of the 18 local governorate elections. The only Assyrian party that won a seat in any governorate was the Assyrian Democratic Movement in the Nineveh Governorate. The party received 4,650 votes and captured one seat (out of 41.)

	Rafidain 204	Bet-Nahrain 148	Minimum votes per seat
Arbil	2,001	-	15,120
Dohuk	4,919	-	8,918
Kirkuk	1,554	-	8,727
Nineveh	4,650	2,315	3,451

In addition, Salvana Boya of the Assyrian Patriotic Party was elected in the Kirkuk Governorate council under the Kurdistani list.

== 2005 Kurdistan Region parliamentary election ==
Elections for the Kurdistan National Assembly, the parliament of the Kurdistan Region of Iraq, were held on 30 January 2005, to coincide with the Iraqi legislative election and governoral council elections. All Assyrian-based parties joined the Democratic Patriotic Alliance of Kurdistan. The coalition won 104 of the 111 seats in the parliament, of which 5 were won by Assyrians:

(in order as they were in the coalition list)

- Jamal Shamon Yalya (CCS) - 69
- Romeo Hakkari (BNDP) - 71
- Bayzar Milko Rohan (CDUP) - 72
- Andreaus Youkhana Georgis (ADM) - 73
- Galawesh Shaba Hojji (ADM) - 76

== December 2005 Iraqi parliamentary election ==
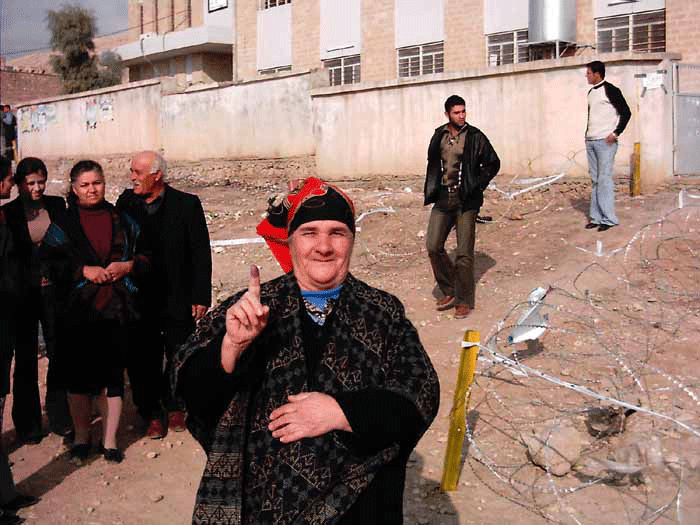
An Assyrian woman voting in Alqosh, in the Iraqi 2005 December elections.

A general election was held on 15 December 2005 to elect a permanent 275-member Iraqi Council of Representatives. The elections took place under a list system, whereby voters chose from a list of parties. In the elections, there were three main Assyrian list:

- National Rafidain List (740) - had only one party, the Assyrian Democratic Movement.
- Patriotic Beth Nahrain (Al-Nahrain National) (752)

Beth Nahren Patriotic Union
Chaldean National Congress
Assyrian Patriotic Party
Syriac Independent Gathering Movement
Chaldean Democratic Forum
Hikmat Hakim (Independent)

- Assyrian General Conference (800)

The Chaldean Democratic Forum, a party led by Saeed Shama that also advocated for a separate Chaldean identity, took part in elections for the first time. Other Assyrian parties decided to side with non-Assyrian based list. The Chaldean Democratic Union Party decided to run under the Kurdish list (730.) The Iraqi Christian Democratic Party of Minas al-Yousifi joined the list of the Iraqi National Dialogue Front (667.) Bet Nahrain Democratic Party of Romeo Hakkari withdrew.

	Rafidain 740	Nahrain 752	AGC 800
Anbar	33	-	-
Arbil	1,705	42	-
Babil	45	-	-
Baghdad	9,986	597	148
Basra	97	105	-
Diyala	92	62	-
Dohuk	4,867	200	135
Karbala	15	-	-
Kirkuk	1,751	136	134
Missan	18	-	-
Muthanna	28	-	-
Najaf	91	-	-
Nineveh	9,010	3,487	194
Qadissiya	27	-	-
Salahadin	204	-	-
Sulaymani	197	-	-
Thiqar	19	-	-
Wasit	11	-	-
Out of country voting	16,067	4,081	1,218
Total	44,263	8,710	1,829

Nineveh Governorate
	Rafidain 740	Nahrain 752	KDP/PUK 730	Allawi 731
Tel Keppe	1,013	50	2,060	150
Bakhdida	2,202	2,513	744	2,854
Karamlesh	637	155	187	256
Alqosh	804	78	271	653
Bartella	1,407	172	500	1,496
Batnaya	214	27	892	202
Tel Skuf	485	36	2,030	720

In all, three Assyrians were voted into the parliament. ADM succeeded in capturing one parliament seat in the Baghdad governorate, which was given to the secretary of its party, Yonadam Kanna. Fawzi Hariri (KDP) and Ablahad Afraim Sawa (CDUP) under the Kurdistani list (730) for the Arbil governorate were voted in as well.

== 2005 Iraqi governorate elections ==
A local governorate election was held on January 31, 2009, in Iraq. There were no elections in the heavily-Assyrian populated north governorate of Dohuk and Arbil (including Slemani and Kirkuk.) 440 seats in 14 (of the 18) Iraqi governorates were up for grabs.

In the last local governorate elections, only one seat (in Nineveh) was won by Assyrians (ADM.) Unlike the 2005 local elections, minority groups had reserved seats ahead of the election. Three seats were reserved for Assyrians; one each in the governorates of Nineveh, Baghdad and Basra.

In the election, there were three main Assyrian blocks fighting for votes. The Assyrian Democratic Movement being one, under the list titled National Rafidain List (504). The other being a Kurdistan Democratic Party-backed block titled the Ishtar Patriotic List (513).

The Ishtar Patriotic List included the following:

- Chaldean Syriac Assyrian Popular Council
- Bet Nahrain Democratic Party
- Chaldean Democratic Forum
- Chaldean Cultural Society
- Beth Nahren Patriotic Union
- Syriac Independent Gathering Movement

The third major list was the Chaldean Democratic Union Party (503).

Nineveh Governorate
	Rafidain 504	Ishtar 513	CDUP 503	KDP/PUK 236
Bakhdida	1,733	7,061	150	-
Bartella	600	2,000	-	-
Karamlesh	360	513	80	136
Bashika	79	647	3	-
Alqosh	512	481	103	872
Baqofah	45	66	47	73
Tel Squf	304	742	240	607
Batnaya	226	200	36	490
Ainsifni	335	90	-	-
Other towns	1,950	1,960	196	-
Total	6,144	13,760	855	-

Baghdad Governorate
	Rafidain 504	Ishtar 513	CDUP 503
Total	3,480	4,334	986

Basra Governorate
	Rafidain 504	CNC 512	CDUP 503
Total	221	214	227

The Nineveh seat was won by Saad Tanios Jaji of SIGM. The Baghdad seat was won by Gewargis Isho Sada of the BNDP. The Ishtar Patriotic List decided not to run in the Basra elections, however, it supported the Chaldean National Congress (CNC.) The Basra seat was won by Saad Matti Boutros of the CDUP.

== 2009 Kurdistan Region general election ==
The Kurdistan Region held elections to elect its 111-member Kurdistan National Assembly on 25 July 2009. Five seats were reserved for Assyrians. There were 8 Assyrian parties that initially signed up to participate in the elections. Prior to the elections, the BNDP decided to withdraw. APP and KACP decided to run on a joint list. CDUP and CNC also merged in a joint list called the "United Chaldean List".

Most Assyrians living in Ankawa were largely reluctant to discuss politics before the election and were unconfident in politicians' ability to attain their rights. The lists that ran as part of the elections also expressed differing political motives; while the CSAPC list ran for the recognition of the three names as one people, the Unified Chaldean List wanted to be considered a separate group and threatened to file suits in the Federal Supreme Court of Iraq.

- Chaldean Syriac Assyrian Popular Council List (68)

Chaldean Syriac Assyrian Popular Council

- National Rafidain List (67)

Assyrian Democratic Movement

- Self government List (65)

Assyrian Patriotic Party
Chaldo-Ashur Communist Party

- United Chaldean List (64)

Chaldean Democratic Union Party
Chaldean Democratic Forum

Results											Total		Seats	
	Dohuk	Zakho	Shaqlawa	Diana	Haodian	Ankawa	Erbil	Koysanjaq	Armota	Other	Votes	%	2005	2009
Chaldean Syriac Assyrian Popular Council	2,426	1,990	463	167	14	1,179	19	15	18	4,304	10,595	53.9	-	3
Assyrian Democratic Movement	3,703	362	173	170	28	930	40	6	12	266	5,690	28.3	2	2
Chaldean Democratic Union Party; Chaldean National Congress	281	30	32	55		365	1			936	1,700	8.6	1	-
Chaldo-Ashur Communist Party; Assyrian Patriotic Party	244	78	10	23	-	883	3			439	1,680	8.5	-	-

The politicians that were elected to parliament are as follows:

- Thair Abdalahad Ogostin (CSAPC)
- Susan Yousif Khoshaba (CSAPC)
- Amir Goga Yousif (CSAPC)
- Salem Toma Kako (ADM)
- Jihan Ismael Benyamin (ADM)

== 2010 Iraqi parliamentary election ==
A parliamentary election was held on 7 March 2010. The parliament previously approved to increase the number of seats from 275 to 325, of which 5 seats were reserved for Assyrians. The reserved seats for Assyrian in Iraqi parliament was the first in the country's history. Going into the elections, four Christians were in the parliament: Yonadam Kanna (ADM), Fawzi Hariri (KDP,) Ablahad Afraim Sawa (CDUP,) and Wijdan Michael (Allawi list.)

The Assyrian Patriotic Party, Chaldean Democratic Forum, and the Bet Nahrain Democratic Party announced on November 15, that they would create an alliance.

Five major lists have been created for the election;

- 389 - National Rafidain List: Assyrian Democratic Movement
- 390 - Chaldean Syriac Assyrian Popular Council list
- 391 - Chaldean National Congress
- 392 - Chaldean Democratic Union Party
- 393 - Independent Sarkis Yousif
- 394 - Ishtar Democratic List: Assyrian Patriotic Party. Beth Nahrain, Chaldean Democratic Forum
- 395 - Independent John (Yohanna) Joseph

All Governorates
	ADM 389	CSAPC 390	CDC 391	CDUP 392	SY 393	Ishtar 394	JJ 395	Total
Anbar	494	137	87	83	68	61	7	937
Babil	201	481	610	96	162	58	74	1,682
Baghdad	6,663	3,440	812	611	532	723	252	13,033
Basra	326	488	1,295	247	243	103	50	2,752
Diyala	101	119	67	795	189	81	22	1,374
Dohuk	7,152	3,631	315	847	250	402	74	12,671
Erbil	1,871	2,323	594	289	117	232	41	5,467
Karbala	97	75	245	484	97	46	44	1,088
Kirkuk	2,115	525	455	124	91	159	59	3,528
Missan	118	72	63	150	224	40	59	726
Muthanna	123	240	70	121	54	36	30	674
Najaf	126	54	82	200	367	65	27	921
Nineveh	7,667	8,858	1,069	699	297	736	3,694	23,020
Qadissiya	117	64	104	320	384	91	61	1,141
Salahadin	145	449	138	95	53	67	22	969
Sulaymani	294	88	42	205	112	41	43	825
Thiqar	373	606	90	137	137	46	31	1,420
Wasit	112	232	470	44	91	90	48	1,087
Total	28,095	21,882	6,608	5,547	3,468	3,077	4,638	73,315
Percent	38.3	29.9	9.0	7.6	4.7	4.2	6.3	100

Nineveh Governorate
	ADM 389	CSAPC 390	CDC 391	CDUP 392	Ishtar 394	JJ 395
Alqosh	421	268	14	-	26	
Bakhdida	1,450	2,754	23	78	32	3,315
Batnaya	112	259	105	14	73	-
Baqofah	22	41	4	-	-	-
Bartella	575	1,886	-	27	2	3
Karamlesh	290	443	4	42	29	16
Tel Kaif	548	98	-	-	-	-
Tel Squf	201	558	186	99	106	-
Erbil Governorate
Ankawa	1,018	1,495	443	71	126	-
Diana	145	186	1	-	32	-
Hawdiyan	34	11	-	-	-	-
Shaqlawa	128	288	9	19	23	-
Dohuk Governorate
Ainsifni	358	104	-	-	33	-
Akre	186	6	-	-	-	-
Der Alok	169	46	-	-	-	-
Dohuk	2,166	424	-	-	-	-
Komani	125	87	-	-	-	-
Monsouriye	140	40	-	-	-	-
Sarsink	372	57	4	11	26	-
Sheyoz	24	136	-	44	-	-
Zakho	679	1,014	-	-	-	-

Three seats were won by the ADM and two seats by the CSAPC. The five elected into the parliament:

- Yonadam Kanna
- Basimah Yusuf Butrus
- Imad Youkhana Yaqo
- Khales Isho Esitefo
- Luis Caro Bandar

== 2013 Iraqi governorate elections ==
A Governorate (or local) elections were held in Iraq on 20 April 2013, with Nineveh Governorate along with Anbar voting on June 20, due to violence in the city caused by the Islamic State of Iraq. Elections didn't take place in the 3 governorates forming the Kurdistan Region.

As with the previous local elections, 3 seats were reserved for Assyrians, including one each in Baghdad, Nineveh and Basra. The Chaldean Syriac Assyrian Popular Council reclaimed their seats in Nineveh and Baghdad, by receiving 8,635 and 1,513 votes respectively.

== 2013 Kurdistan Region parliamentary election ==
Kurdistan Region held elections to elect its 111-member Kurdistan National Assembly on 21 September 2013. Each Kurdish party listed 100 candidates while each Assyrian and Turkman party listed 5 candidates. There were 3 Assyrian lists running for the five reserved seats. Prior to the election, some ADM members decided to leave the party and run on their own list called Sons of Mesopotamia.

- 125 Sons of Mesopotamia List
  - List included former individuals from the Assyrian Democratic Movement
- 126 National Rafidain List
  - Assyrian Democratic Movement
- 127 Chaldean Syriac Assyrian United List
  - Assyrian Patriotic Party
  - Bet-Nahrain Democratic Party
  - Chaldean National Council
  - Chaldean Syriac Assyrian Popular Council

=== Results ===
The elections resulted in the Popular Council losing one seat, while ADM retaining two seats and the new Mesopotamia List being given one seat. Yaqoub Gorgis and Lina Azriya Bahram of the ADM were elected along with Srood Maqdasy from the Mesopotamia List. Within the Chaldean Syriac Assyrian United List, the Popular Council managed retain its 2 seats.

			Seats	
	Votes	%	2009	2013
Assyrian Democratic Movement	6,145	47.4	2	2
Chaldean Syriac Assyrian United List	5,730	44.2	3	2
Sons of Mesopotamia List	1,093	8.4	-	1
Total	12,968	100	5	5

Chaldean Syriac Assyrian United List individual votes:

Chaldean Syriac Assyrian United List
Name	Party	Votes
Wahida Yaqo Hirmiz	Chaldean Syriac Assyrian Popular Council	2,517
Kamal Yalda Markoz	Chaldean Syriac Assyrian Popular Council	1,466
Nina Louis	Bet-Nahrain Democratic Party	507
Sargon Salim	Assyrian Patriotic Party	400
Janan Jabbar	Chaldean National Council	273

Other Assyrians ran in Kurdish parties, but non were able to get enough votes to win a seat in the parliament. Many voters in Assyrian dominated Areas voted for these parties, including 3,377 votes for the Kurdistan Democratic Party in Ankawa alone.

Kurdistan Communist Party
Name	votes	Ranking in List (out of 100)
Insaf Munif Yaqub	374	4
Abdulmasih Sleman Yalda	205	13
Victoria Yalda Gorgis	64	47
Bouya Markos Behnam	59	49
Nithal Walid Louis	58	50
Dalia Farid Noori	40	57
Talia Khamis Matti	21	68
Luay Jameel Sanati	15	74
Total	836	-

Kurdistan Democratic Party
Name	votes	Ranking in List (out of 100)
Christof (Rebwar) Yalda	3,497	71
Sanna Yaqub	824	100
Total	4,321	-

== 2014 Iraqi parliamentary election ==
Parliamentary elections were held in Iraq on 30 April 2014, electing the 328 members of the Council of Representatives, of which 5 were reserved for the Assyrian minority. 2 of the seats were won by the Assyrian Democratic Movement, 2 by the Chaldean Syriac Assyrian Popular Council, and one by the Iraqi Communist Party who was under the Civil Democratic Alliance.

2014 Iraqi Parliament Assyrian winners
Name	Party	Votes	Governorate
Yonadam Kanna	Assyrian Democratic Movement	9,023	Baghdad
Sargon Lazar	Assyrian Democratic Movement	3,908	Kirkuk
Polis Shamoon Ishak	Chaldean Syriac Assyrian Popular Council	1,240	Erbil
Raed Ishak Matti	Chaldean Syriac Assyrian Popular Council	4,929	Nineveh
Azad Hirmiz Nissan	Iraqi Communist Party	416	Duhok

Azad was replaced Joseph Sylawa. ADM tried but failed to make Sargon Lazar a minister, after Sargon resigned his seat and gave it to Imad Youkhana Yaqo.

== 2018 Iraqi parliamentary election ==
Parliamentary elections were held in Iraq on 12 May 2018, electing 329 members of the Council of Representatives. A total of 7 different Assyrian lists competed for the 5 reserved seats. Babylon Movement, a mostly non-Assyrian militia linked to the Iranian-backed paramilitary group, entered the parliament for the first time after receiving more than 33,000 votes, leading to winning 2 seats. CSAPC, Rafidain list and the Chaldean Catholic-supported Chaldean list all received one seat. Many within the Assyrian community publicly condemned Babylon Movement and its leader Rayan al-Kildani for taking reserved seats for the Assyrian communities through votes coming mostly from southern Shia Arab individuals. The results to some even calling for the then US President Donald Trump to pressure Iraqi authorities to invalidate the results, however no actions were taken.

== 2021 Iraqi parliamentary election ==
Patriarch Louis Raphaël I Sako and other Christian politicians accused the Babylon Movement (which won 4 out of 5 seats in the 2021 Iraqi parliamentary election) of having a Shia Muslim voter base. Similarly, the independent Christian candidate Farouq Hanna Atto is said to owe his victory to the Kurdistan Democratic Party. Before the election, the patriarch called for an election boycott.

Party	Votes	%	Seats	+/–
Babylon Movement	50,378	52.22	4	▲2
Hammurabi Coalition	18,212	18.88	0	–
Assyrian Democratic Movement	10,572	10.96	0	–
Chaldean Syriac Assyrian Popular Council	7,589	7.87	0	–
Farouq Hanna Atto	5,084	5.27	1	–
Assyrian National Party	2,810	2.91	0	–
Beth Nahrin Patriotic Union	1,827	1.89	0	–
Total	96,472	100.00	5	–
Source: Kurdistan24

== 2023 Iraqi governorate elections ==
The 2023 Iraqi governorate elections were held on December 18, 2023, after almost 10 years passing after the last one. The delay was mostly due to the 2014 ISIS invasion and occupation. Governorates under the KRG did not participate. For the Assyrians, reserved seats were allocated in the following governorates: Basra, Baghdad, Kirkuk, and Ninewa.

== 2025 Iraqi parliamentary election ==
Two alliances were founded before the election, the Christian Alliance and Athra Alliance with the intention to participate in the election.

19 candidates are set to participate in the election with most being noted to be independents. Some famous politicians including the leader of the Beth Nahrin Patriotic Union were excluded. The party boycotted the election. The Patriotic Union of Kurdistan endorsed the candidates of the Babylon Movement and withdrew support for their nominees days before the election. The Assyrian Democratic Movement won 2 constituencies with help from the Kurdistan Democratic Party.

Party	Votes	%	Seats
Assyrian Democratic Movement	36,074		2
Kurdistan Democratic Party	22,836		1
Babylon Movement	19,355		2
Total			5
Total votes	154,227	–	
Source: The National Context (only votes of winning candidates)

== See also ==
- Assyrian independence movement
- Assyrians in Iraq
- Politics of Iraq

== Sources ==
- BarAbraham, Abdulmesih (2018). "Safeguarding the Cross: Emergence of Christian Militias in Iraq and Syria". Middle Eastern Christians and Europe: Historical Legacies and Present Challenges. Wien: LIT Verlag. pp. 217–238. ISBN 9783643910233.
- Dougherty, Beth K. (2019) [2004]. Historical Dictionary of Iraq (3rd ed.). Lanham: Rowman & Littlefield. ISBN 9781538120057.
- Donabed, Sargon G. (2015). Reforging a Forgotten History: Iraq and the Assyrians in the Twentieth Century. Edinburgh: Edinburgh University Press. ISBN 9780748686056.
- Hunter, Erica C. D. (2019). "Changing Demography: Christians in Iraq since 1991". The Syriac World. London: Routledge. pp. 783–796. ISBN 9781138899018.
- Lalik, Krzysztof (2018). "Ethnic and Religious Factors of Chaldo-Assyrian Identity in an Interface with the Kurds in Iraqi Kurdistan". Rediscovering Kurdistan's Cultures and Identities: The Call of the Cricket. Cham: Springer. pp. 213–257. ISBN 9783319930886.
- Müller, Hannelore (2018). "Assyrian Christians in Iraq, the League of Nations and Transnational Christian Advocacy (1920s–1940s)". Sayfo 1915: An Anthology of Essays on the Genocide of Assyrians/Arameans during the First World War. Piscataway, NJ: Gorgias Press. pp. 253–304. ISBN 9781463207304.
- Petrosian, Vahram (2006). "Assyrians in Iraq" (PDF). Iran and the Caucasus. 10 (1): 113–147. doi:10.1163/157338406777979322. ISSN 1609-8498.
- Salloum, Saad (2019). "Minorities in Iraq: National Legal Framework, Political Participation, and the Future of Citizenship Given the Current Changes". Beyond ISIS: History and Future of Religious Minorities in Iraq. London: Transnational Press. pp. 11–32. ISBN 9781912997152.
- Schmidinger, Thomas (2019). "Christians in Iraq". Beyond ISIS: History and Future of Religious Minorities in Iraq. London: Transnational Press. pp. 113–124. ISBN 9781912997152.
- Teule, Herman G. B. (2009). "The Christian Minorities in Iraq: The Question of Religious and Ethnic Identity". In-Between Spaces: Christian and Muslim Minorities in Transition in Europe and the Middle East. Brussel: Peter Lang. pp. 45–57. ISBN 9789052015651.
- Teule, Herman G. B. (2012). "Christians in Iraq: An Analysis of Some Recent Political Developments" (PDF). Der Islam. 88 (1): 179–198. doi:10.1515/islam-2011-0010. hdl:2066/101464. S2CID 156389791.
- Teule, Herman G. B. (2018). "Christians in Iraq: The Transition from Religious to Secular Identity". International Journal of Asian Christianity. 1: 11–24. doi:10.1163/25424246-00101002. S2CID 158309301.
- Youkhana, Emanuel (2019). "Fleeing ISIS: Aramaic-speaking Christians in the Niniveh Plains after ISIS". Beyond ISIS: History and Future of Religious Minorities in Iraq. London: Transnational Press. pp. 125–150. ISBN 9781912997152.
