= Ano Abdoka =

Chaldean politician in Iraqi Kurdistan

Minister Ano Jawhar Abdoka
- ܐܢܘ ܥܒܕܘܟܐ
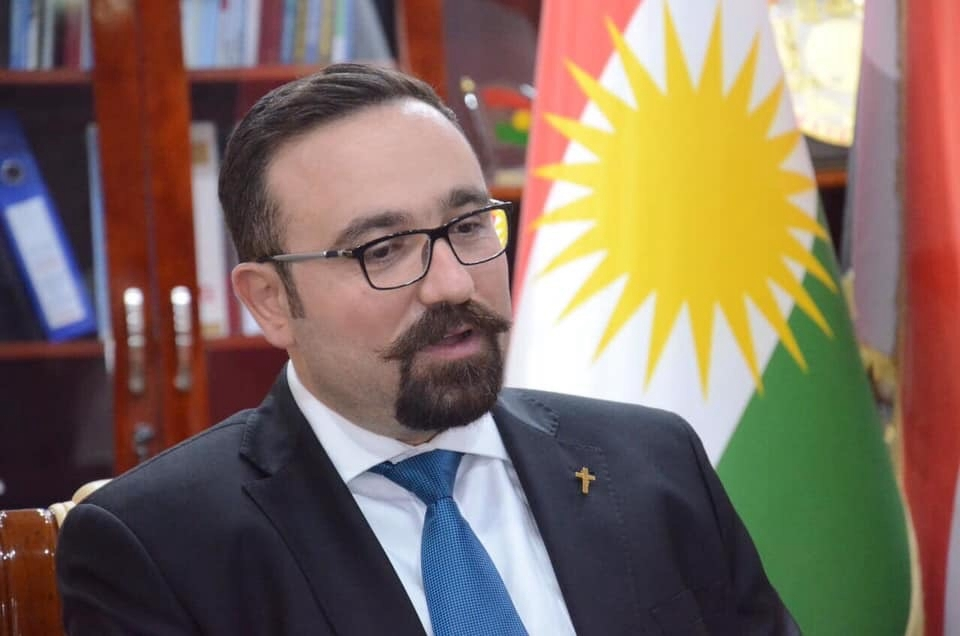

Minister of Transport and Communications / Kurdistan Region
- Incumbent
- Assumed office 11 July 2019

Personal details
- Born: 1984 (age 41–42)
- Party: Kurdistan Democratic Party
- Other political affiliations: Shlama Trend for Christians Affairs/National Unity Alliance
- Education: PhD in Politics and International Relations

Ano Jawhar Abdulmaseeh Abdoka, or Ano Abdoka (Syriac: ܐܢܘ ܥܒܕܘܟܐ, Arabic: أنو عبدوكا) is an Chladean politician who serves as the Minister of Transport and Communications of the Kurdistan Region of Iraq since July 2019. Abdoka leads the Shlama Trend for Christian Affairs in the Kurdish region, and he previously led the local committee of the Kurdistan Democratic Party in Ankawa. He is currently the only Chaldean and Christian member of the Kurdish Government's cabinet.

== Early life ==
Abdoka was born to an Assyro-Chaldean family in 1984 in the city of Ankawa, Erbil, where he grew up. While his father's side of his family was directly from Ankawa, his mother's family come from Alqosh. Abdoka graduated with a Diploma in Media from the Technical Institute of Erbil. He attended the University of Kurdistan Hewler, where he holds a bachelor's, master's, and PhD candidacy in Politics and International Relations.

== Career ==
Abdoka was the head of the Christian department for the Kurdistan TV channel owned by the KDP. In 2013, he established the Shlama Trend for Christian Affairs in 2013 as an NGO and political bloc to defend the social and political interests of Christians in the KRI. The bloc introduced a list during the 2013 Kurdistan Region parliamentary election, which included Lara Zara, but failed to win any seats. The bloc also failed to win any seats during the 2014 Iraqi parliamentary election. In 2017, Abdoka was the head of the KDP's office in Ankawa.

Before swearing in to his position as Transport and Communications Minister, Abdoka took his oath on a centuries-old manuscript damaged by ISIS as a symbolic gesture. Abdoka stated prior to his ceremony, "It is a challenge that we as Christians, Chaldeans, Assyrians, and Syrians are remaining in the land of our ancestors...The Nineveh Plains, Iraq, Mesopotamia, and Kurdistan are our lands, and we are remaining here with the help of our friends in the Kurdistan Region.” Abdoka was sworn in to parliament representing the National Unity Alliance, a rebranded version of the Shlama Trend organized to run during the 2018 Kurdistan Region parliamentary election.

During his tenure as Minister, the Ministry began reforming the transportation sector by outlawing smoking in taxis and buses and implementing regulations with vehicle radios. Moreover, under his directive, he pushed Internet companies to reduce prices and improve Internet speed in the KRI. In 2021, Abdoka was involved in designating Ankawa as a dedicated district with administrative autonomy. In 2024, he had participated in the arrest of an unnamed man who posted a Tiktok video of himself desecrating a Christian cemetery in Shaqlawa, an event which sparked outrage in Iraq.

== Controversy ==
In 2017, the Assyrian Confederation of Europe noted that the Government of the Kurdistan Region upheld Abdoka as a "legitimate political representative of the Assyrian people", despite having not previously held any office. The Confederation also noted that Abdoka had been misidentified as a "Kurdish Christian" and supported a KRG-administered Nineveh governorate in an interview with the Clarion Project, which pleased KDP officials but went against Assyrian wishes.

In 2018, the Assyrian Policy Institute (API) wrote that Abdoka was accused of fraud during the 2018 Kurdistan Region parliamentary election. According to the report, a lawsuit filed by a member of the Chaldean Syriac Assyrian Popular Council alleged that Abdoka had faked 500 signatures for the National Unity Alliance's filing requirements for their list. Although Abdoka won the case against him, API suggested that locals were unconvinced of the verdict. Abdoka was also criticized by the API for backing Hoshyar Yalda, a candidate of the Chaldean Coalition, where it was alleged that Assyrians in Ankawa were pressured by the KDP to provide proof of having voted for him in the elections. According to interviews conducted by API, Abdoka would have reports on Assyrians attending events from other political parties in order to earn his salary; other Assyrians were subsequently threatened with severance of employment.

In 2020, API criticized Abdoka for making misleading claims about the Nineveh Plain Protection Units (NPU) in an op-ed published by Rudaw Media Network. In his article, Abdoka criticized the NPU as a "small milita" and advocated for security measures that would reinstate forces of the Peshmerga into the Nineveh Plains. API described Abdoka's claims as "evidently driven by the KDP's agenda with regard to the disputed territories", while also highling the NPU's effective in Assyrian returns post-ISIS over the Peshmerga and the Iraqi army. Abdoka has previously disputed Assyrian persecution in the KRI

In May 2024, Abdoka created a new Christian Alliance composed of several organizations and political parties representing Armenians and Assyrians. The alliance was created following the removal of minority seats in the 2024 Kurdistan Region parliamentary election, which caused criticism and boycott of the elections by the Kurdistan Democratic Party. The formed alliance was built off of Abdoka's Hammurabi Alliance, which includes the Syriac Assembly Movement, Chaldean National Congress and Chaldean Democratic Party, and the Chaldean League, and starting with the Christian alliance, additional representatives from the Armenian Orthodox Church and Armenian Culture Association. The alliance has previously been criticized for the lack of support of the political parties that were involved, and the formation of the Christian alliance renewed these criticisms against Abdoka.

== Personal life ==
Abdoka is a Chaldean Catholic and is fluent in Syriac, English, Kurdish and Arabic. Abdoka is also married to a wife from Alqosh. In an interview with Benjamen Kweskin of the Philos Project, Abdoka discussed how he writes poetry.

== Bibliography ==
- Hanna, Reine; Barber, Matthew (25 September 2017). Erasing Assyrians: How the KRG Abuses Human Rights, Undermines Democracy, and Conquers Minority Homelands (PDF) (Report). Assyrian Confederation of Europe. pp. 40–41.
- Hanna, Reine; Joseph, Max (27 November 2018). Iraq's Stolen Election: How Assyrian Representation Became Assyrian Repression (PDF) (Report). Assyrian Policy Institute.
- Hanna, Reine; Kruczek, Gregory (1 June 2020). Contested Control: The Future of Security in Iraq’s Nineveh Plain (PDF) (Report). Assyrian Policy Institute. Archived from the original (PDF) on 16 July 2020.
