= Chaldean Democratic Union Party =

Iraqi Assyrian political party

Chaldean Democratic Union Party ܓܒܐ ܕܚܘܝܕܐ ܕܝܡܘܩܪܛܝܐ ܟܠܕܝܐ
- Abbreviation: CDUP
- Leader: Elhad Afram Sawa Hanna
- Founder: Ablahad Afraim Sawa
- Founded: 2003
- Ideology: Chaldean nationalism/separatism
- National affiliation: Christian Alliance

Website
- Archived 2013-07-03 at the Wayback Machine

The Chaldean Democratic Union Party (Syriac: ܓܒܐ ܕܚܘܝܕܐ ܕܝܡܘܩܪܛܝܐ ܟܠܕܝܐ, Arabic: حزب الاتحاد الديمقراطي الكلداني, Sorani Kurdish: پارتی يەکيتی ديموکراتی کلدانی), also known as the Chaldean Democratic Union or the Chaldean Democratic Party, is an Iraqi Assyrian political party. Originally formed in 2000, the party was fully licensed to operate in 2003, and has since been involved in Assyrian politics in Iraq. As of 2026, the party remains active as part of the Christian Alliance led by Ano Abdoka.

The CDUP is suggested to have been an artificial creation of the Kurdistan Democratic Party, of which its founder, Ablahad Afraim Sawa, was a member of. The party politically represented Chaldean nationalism/separatism in Iraq, and was well known for its sectarian advocacy of an exclusive Chaldean identity, which was routinely criticized by the Assyrian community. At its height of activity, the party had its leader Sawa in the Iraqi National Assembly, who was elected in both the January and December 2005 elections; the party won the Christian reserved seat in the 2009 Basra governorate election. Its participation in elections in both Iraq and the Kurdistan Region was primarily due to funding and support from the KDP, which the party never achieved results without. Today, the Chaldean Democratic Union Party is considered to be a proxy political party.

== History ==
The CDUP was founded after the 2003 U.S. invasion of Iraq as a component of the Democratic Patriotic Alliance of Kurdistan. Supposedly, the party itself began in the year 2000, and in 2003, received its license and opened its first office. The party was granted its license on February 26 and received support from the Chaldean National Congress to begin its operations; the party was headed by Ablahad Afraim Sawa, who was a member of the Kurdistan Democratic Party.

From its inception, the party was known for its promotion of Chaldean separatism, vehemently denying Assyrian identity in place of a Chaldean one. Chaldean Catholic bishop Sarhad Yawsip Jammo organized the CDUP as the legitimate representative of the Chaldean community in Iraq, formalizing what Yasmeen Hanoosh describes as a "religiously colored Chaldean separatist pronouncement." In the same year, after the Fall of the Saddam regime, the party issued a joint statement with the CNC protesting the lack of uniquely Chaldean voices in the Iraqi Governing Council, and leaders also rejected the compromise "Chaldo-Assyrian" label proposed.

The party was not known to collaborate with other Assyrian political parties unless they shared similar views on a sectarian Chaldean identity. However, there were some occasions where the party participated in meetings with other groups, such as the Assyrian Democratic Movement. In 2010, the party participated in a conference held by the Assyrian Universal Alliance in Ankawa with 15 other Assyrian organizations concerning issues of political rights and autonomy.

== Electoral history ==
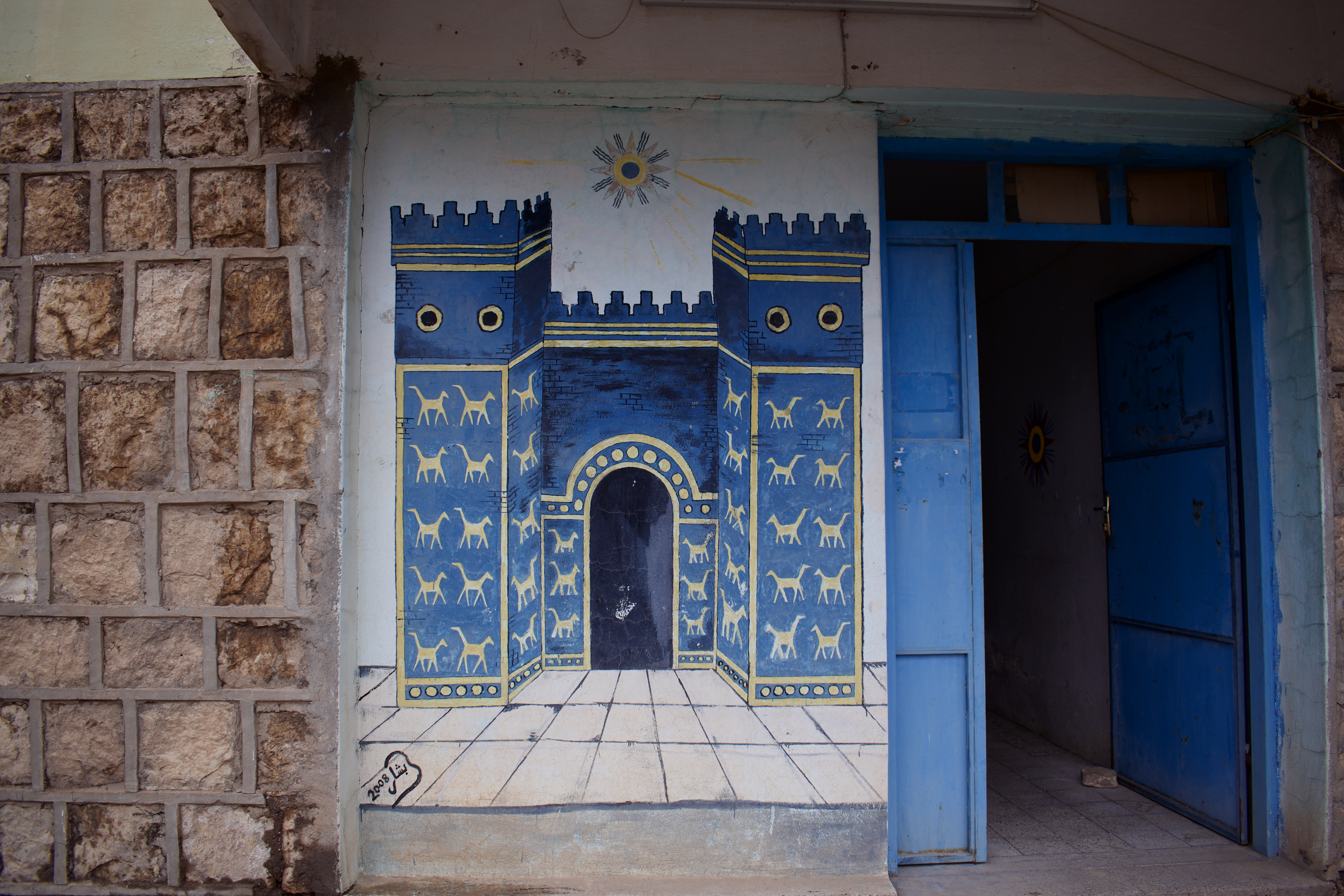
Chaldean Democratic Party office in Alqosh

The CDUP first participated in Iraqi elections with the January 2005 Iraqi parliamentary election; the party joined the Kurdistan Alliance list and Ablahad Sawa won a seat in parliament. Sawa would also win a seat in parliament in the December 2005 Iraqi parliamentary election being on the same list. The CDUP was elected in the 2005 Kurdistan Region parliamentary election under the Democratic Patriotic Alliance of Kurdistan, alongside the Chaldean Cultural Society.

In the 2009 Iraqi governorate elections, the party ran as part of its own list (503), listing three candidates for the minority quota seat in the Nineveh, Baghdad, and Basra governorates. The party won the seat in the Basra governorate, while the Nineveh and Baghdad seats were won by the Syriac Assembly Movement and the Bet-Nahrain Democratic Party, respectively. During the 2009 Kurdistan Region parliamentary election, the party ran as part of a "Unified Chaldean List" alongside the Chaldean National Congress; candidates for the list emphasized the separation of Chaldean identity as a distinct recognition in the Kurdistan Region constitution. The list failed to win any seats. In the 2010 Iraqi parliamentary election, the party received 5,547 votes across all governorates, landing them behind the Chaldean Syriac Assyrian Popular Council, the Rafidain List, and the CNC in terms of number of votes. The party also contested the elections on a list separate from the CNC; however, they failed to win any seats. During this time, the party criticized the CSAPC for exerting voting pressure on candidates in exchange for housing and allowances.

In the 2014 Iraqi parliamentary election, Sawa was a participant as part of the "Ur National List," which came second-to-last among the Assyrian lists who participated. In the 2018 Iraqi parliamentary election, the party ran alongside the CDP and the CCC-backed Chaldean League as part of the "Chaldean Coalition." The coalition received 14,188 votes in the election, with one seat being allocated to Hoshyar Yalda in Erbil. The party was stated to have put forward two candidates for the Coalition. The party ran as part of a "National Unity" alliance in the 2018 Kurdistan Region parliamentary election.

In the 2021 Iraqi parliamentary election, the party was signed onto the Hammurabi Coalition of Ano Abdoka alongside the Syriac Assembly Movement and the Chaldean National Congress, which participated in the Nineveh, Erbil, Kirkuk, Duhok, and Baghdad governorates. After the election, the party signed a joint statement calling for a manual recount of votes for the Christian quota after electoral manipulation by the Babylon Movement was alleged to have occurred. In 2024, following the revocation of minority seats in the Kurdistan Region Parliament, the party boycotted that year's Kurdistan Region parliamentary election, calling the ruling an "attack on coexistence and a violation of the constitution." Two months later, the party was signed onto a political alliance titled the "Christian Alliance", announced by Ano Abdoka. The party participated in the 2025 Iraqi parliamentary election as part of the alliance.

== Criticism ==
From its formation, the party was criticized as a way of promoting divisive strategies among Assyrians in undermining their political aspirations in Iraq. The party's formation prompted secretary general of the ADM, Yonadam Kanna, to stress a position of unity at a meeting in Saladin Governorate. The ADM has also criticized the CDUP and other Chaldean political parties formed after the U.S. invasion; while directed towards the Chaldean National Congress, ADM's statement noted that the membership of these parties were very few in number, and they hadn't actively addressed the continuous demographic changes that Assyrians were facing from the violence of the conflict.

Much like other political parties promoting Chaldean separatism, the CDUP has been noted/criticized in the past for its affiliation with the Kurdistan Democratic Party, which it received funding from. Since its establishment, various Assyrian sources and figures have suggested that the party was an artificial creation of the KDP in order to advance Chaldean separatism among Iraq's Assyrians. In a report written by the Assyrian Policy Institute, the group noted that the party and other sectarian Chaldean/Syriac candidates had never been able to win any seats in government without the affiliation of a KDP-bloc or receiving funding from the KDP. The report also noted that in contrast to the Assyrian Democratic Movement and other parties, the CDUP only had two offices in Tesqopa and Alqosh, despite advocating for a "Chaldean nation," and in the 2009 Kurdistan Region parliamentary elections, the coalition the party was a part of received only just over 200 votes.

== Modern activity ==
In April 2024, the party released an official statement welcoming the return of Louis Raphaël I Sako to Baghdad after the reinstatement of his decree. As part of the 2024 Iraqi census, the party took part in a collective statement issued by the "Chaldean Supreme Political Committee," calling on the federal Iraqi government and the Kurdish regional government to follow the Iraqi constitution in regards to properly representing community demographics, emphasizing that it was a historic move for the country. In September 2025, the party collaborated with the Chaldean Catholic Eparchy of Duhok to organize a memorial to the 1969 Soria massacre. In April 2026, the party sent a congratulatory letter to Paul III Nona to commemorate his election as Patriarch of the Chaldean Catholic Church.

== Bibliography ==
- Al-Jaberi, Sattar Jabbar (25 April 2025). "نتائج االنتخابات البرلمانية العراقية 2021: دراسة تحليلية" [The results of the Iraqi parliamentary elections 2021: An analytical study]. Journal of the Faculty of Law and Political Science (in Arabic) (28): 257–279. ISSN 2664-4088.
- Boháč, Artur (1 April 2010). "Assyrian Ethnic Identity in a Globalizing World" (PDF). Beyond Globalisation: Exploring the Limits of Globalisation in the Regional Context. University of Ostrava: 67–72.
- Hanish, Shak (16 March 2010) [Spring 2008]. "The Chaldean Assyrian Syriac People of Iraq: An Ethnic Identity Problem". Digest of Middle East Studies. 17 (1). University of Wisconsin-Milwaukee: 32–47. doi:10.1111/j.1949-3606.2008.tb00145.x. ISSN 1060-4367.
- Hanna, Reine; Barber, Matthew (25 September 2017). Erasing Assyrians: How the KRG Abuses Human Rights, Undermines Democracy, and Conquers Minority Homelands (PDF) (Report). Assyrian Confederation of Europe.
- Hanna, Reine; Joseph, Max (27 November 2018). Iraq's Stolen Election: How Assyrian Representation Became Assyrian Repression (PDF) (Report). Assyrian Policy Institute.
- Hanoosh, Yasmeen (Fall 2016). "Minority Identities Before and After Iraq: The Making of the Modern Assyrian and Chaldean Appellations". The Arab Studies Journal. 24 (2). Portland State University: Arab Studies Institute. JSTOR 44742878 – via JSTOR.
- Hughes, Erin (June 29, 2016). An American atra? Boundaries of diasporic nation-building amongst Assyrians and Chaldeans in the United States (PhD thesis). The University of Edinburgh.
- Petrosian, Vahram (2006). "Assyrians in Iraq". Iran and the Caucasus. 10 (1): 113–147. doi:10.1163/157338406777979322. ISSN 1609-8498 – via JSTOR.
- Teule, Herman G. B. (2012). "Christians in Iraq: An Analysis of Some Recent Political Developments" (PDF). Der Islam. 88 (1): 179–198. doi:10.1515/islam-2011-0010. hdl:2066/101464. S2CID 156389791.
