= 2009 Basra governorate election =

2009 Basra Governorate election
- 31 January 2009

All 35 seats for the Baghdad Governorate council
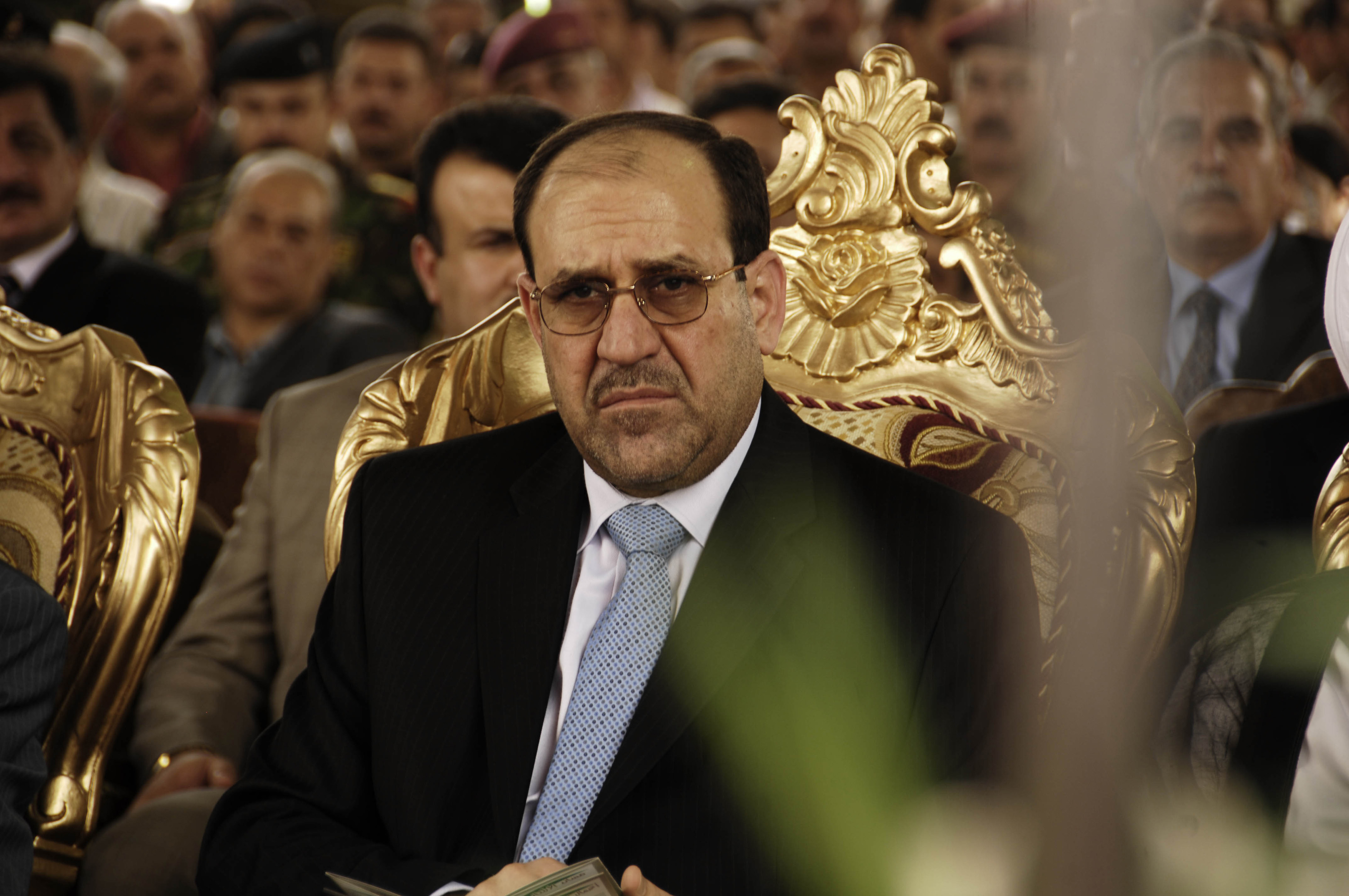

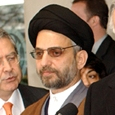
	First party	Second party	Third party
Leader	Nouri al-Maliki	Abdul Aziz al-Hakim	al-Faiz
Party	State of Law	Al-Mehraab Martyr List	Gathering of Justice and Unity
Last election	3	20	0
Seats before	3	20	0
Seats won	20	5	2
Seat change	▲17	▼15	▲2
Popular vote	239,007	74,879	34,862
Percentage	37%	11.6%	5.4%
Swing	▲	▼	▲5.4%
	Fourth party
Leader	Muqtada al-Sadr
Party	Sadrist Movement
Last election	2
Seats before	2
Seats won	2
Seat change	No change
Popular vote	32,020
Percentage	5.96%
Swing	▲
Governor of Baghdad before election
Muhammad al-Waili
Fadhila
Subsequent Governor
Shitagh Abbud
State of Law

The Basra governorate election of 2009 was held on 31 January 2009 alongside elections for all other governorates outside Iraqi Kurdistan and Kirkuk.

== Background ==
One seat in the election is reserved for Assyrian Christians

Basra is the main oil-producing and transit centre in Iraq, which has led to intense competition over control of its Governorate. It has been the centre of competition between the al-Maliki Federal government, which controls the police and army, the Islamic Virtue Party Governor of Basra which controls the Oil Protection Corps and local militias from the Sadrist Movement and Tharallah. Following the Battle of Basra in 2008, the central government seized control of the city's streets from the Sadrist Movement and the security situation improved.

In April 2007, SIIC successfully brought a no-confidence motion against Governor Waili. This dismissal was ratified by Prime Minister Nouri al-Maliki in July, but eventually overturned by the Supreme Court.

The central government has organized "Local Support Committee" militias, has spent $100 million in reconstruction projects and has started paying unemployment benefits in the province. This was expected to lead to an increased support for Prime Minister Nouri al-Maliki's Islamic Dawa Party.

Meanwhile, the Islamic Virtue Party dropped Waeli from its candidate list, reportedly due to his "polarizing" effect.

In a move away from their traditional apolitical stance, a list with a core support from the Shaykhiya religious community stood for the first time.

== Basra Region ==
In November 2008 Wael Abdul Latif, an Independent Islamist MP backed by tribal Sheikhs, submitted a petition to the Electoral Commission of Iraq signed by 34,800 people calling for a vote on a Region of Iraq covering only the governorate of Basrah. The Sadrist movement opposed the move, saying it was "playing with fire" as did the Islamic Dawa Party of Prime Minister Nouri al-Maliki. SCIRI remained neutral, as it supports a nine-province Region covered the whole of southern Iraq. As the petition was signed by more than 2% of the population, the commission published an official request for signatures; if more than 10% of the population had signed it before 15 January 2009, a referendum would have been held within 15 days. In the event, the initiative failed to reach 10% and was struck down by the Electoral Commission. Backers accused the al-Maliki federal government of blocking their media campaign and appealed the decision to the Federal Court.

== Results ==
Summary of the 31 January 2009 Basra governorate election results
Coalition 2005/2009	Allied national parties	Leader	Seats (2005)	Seats (2009)	Change	Votes
State of Law Coalition	Islamic Dawa Party	Nouri Al-Maliki	3	20	+17	239,007
Al Mihrab Martyr List	ISCI	Abdul Aziz al-Hakim	20	5	-15	74,879
Gathering of Justice and Unity			-	2	+2	34,862
Independent Free Movement List	Sadrist Movement	Muqtada al-Sadr	2	2	-	32,020
Iraqi Islamic Party	Iraqi Islamic Party	Tariq al-Hashimi	-	2	+2	24,817
Iraqi National List	Iraqi National Accord	Iyad Allawi	4	2	-2	21,091
Islamic Virtue Party	Islamic Virtue Party	Abdelrahim Al-Husseini	12	1	-11	20,932
Chaldean Democratic Union Party (Assyrian reserved seat)	CDUP	Ablahad Afraim Sawa	-	1	+1	227
Other Parties						198,274
Total			41	35	-6	646,109
Sources: this article - Al Sumaria - New York Times -

== See also ==
- Assyrian politics in Iraq#Iraqi Governorate Elections 2009
