= International reactions to the election of Pope Leo XIV =

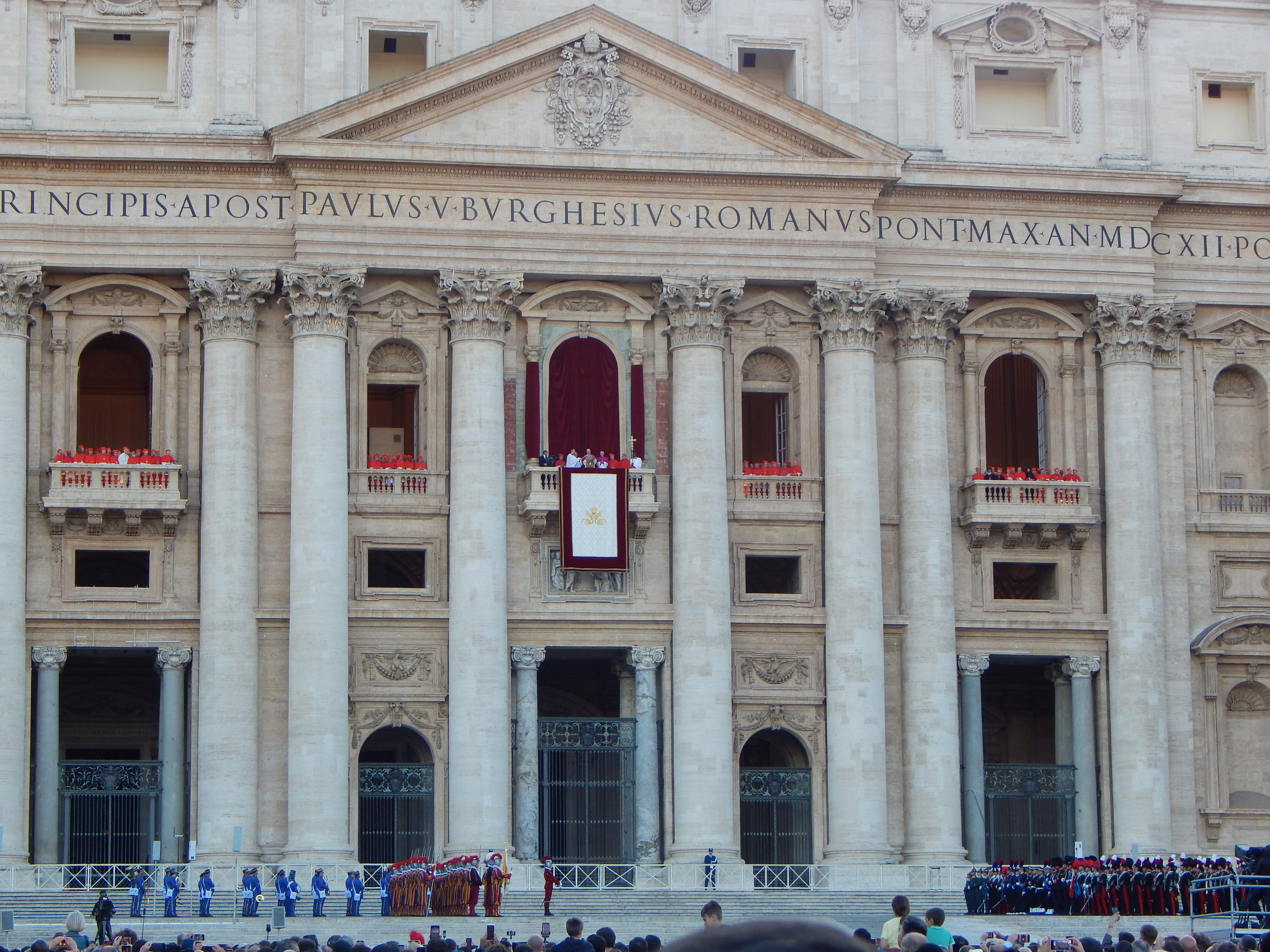
Pope Leo XIV on the loggia of St. Peter's Basilica following his election

After the 2025 conclave resulting in the election of cardinal Robert Francis Prevost as Pope Leo XIV, both the United States and Peru celebrated his election (who has dual nationality) as their own. The news was received with jubilation in the Diocese of Chiclayo, where Prevost served as bishop, particularly among the clergy, and the Archdiocese of Lima celebrated by ringing the bells of the Metropolitan Cathedral of Lima. Various national leaders voiced their congratulations and comments regarding the election of the new pope.

== Cardinals ==
Despite the secrecy of the conclave, cardinals often talk to the media in the aftermath to discuss some behind-the-scenes details, with some anonymous cardinals having disclosed vote tallies. Among the first was Luis Antonio Tagle, one of the several papabili discussed pre-conclave, who told Il Messaggero that as he perceived Prevost to be tense in the last round of voting, he offered him a candy. As he had told in the past, Tagle described the newly-elected pope as "very human, very humble, but very insightful". According to three anonymous cardinals, Prevost held his head in his hands as his name was read out loud on the final balloting. Mykola Bychok lightly joked that being shut off from the world for an extended time was the highlight of his life. He advised, "Just try ... try to turn off your phone at least for 24 hours – my phone was turned off for two and a half days", and added that the conclave was different from the 2024 film Conclave, which did not depict prayer until nearly at the end of the film. Vincent Nichols described the conclave as immensely peaceful and without rancour or politicking: no one said whom to vote for or whom not to vote for.

In an interview to the Catholic press agency of the Bishops' Conference of Bosnia and Herzegovina, Cardinal Vinko Puljić stated that the first ballot was "dispersive" but that from the second vote it was clear that the favorite was Prevost because "it was seen that he had the ability to be a leader" and in particular "the cardinals appointed by Pope Francis gave him strong support". According to Cardinal Wilton Gregory, Prevost did not make "any particular statement" during the pre-conclave General Congregations, and instead "engaged quite effectively" in smaller group discussions; Gregory said that there was no "extraordinarily convincing speech that enthused" the College of Cardinals but rather a constant dialogue among the cardinal electors. Reinhard Marx, the Archbishop of Munich and Freising and a progressive who was close to Pope Francis, would not talk about conclave discussions behind closed doors but said that before the doors of the Sistine Chapel were closed, small groups of cardinals would say, "What about this one, what about that one?", and he took note of Prevost. He stated, "That convinced me to say, this could be a possibility. We had a very good conversation. I realized he's a man who listens, takes arguments seriously, weighs them. You can't just place him into one camp — he really tries to build bridges. I liked that very much."

Describing the moment when he cast his vote in the Sistine Chapel, the American prelate cardinal Joseph Tobin said: "I took a look at Bob and he had his head in his hands and I was praying for him. And then when he accepted, it was like it was made for him." Archbishop of Chicago Blase Cupich said he thanked Prevost several times for accepting his election as pope. According to Gregory, Prevost's American nationality was not a factor as he said they were most concerned with "who among us can bring us together, who among us can strengthen the faith and bring the faith to places where it has grown weak".

== Political ==
- Argentina – President Javier Milei tweeted in Spanish in all-caps, "The forces of Heaven have given their verdict clearly", while attaching an AI-generated image of a lion in papal robes, in reference to Prevost's papal name Leo, a Latin word for lion.
- Australia – Prime Minister Anthony Albanese wrote on social media, "My heartfelt congratulations to Pope Leo XIV on his election", calling it a "moment of joy", before asking for God's blessing.
- Austria – Chancellor Christian Stocker tweeted in German, congratulating Pope Leo XIV on his election.
- Azerbaijan – President Ilham Aliyev congratulated Pope Leo XIV on his election, saying he was "confident that our fruitful cooperation with the Holy See will continue to develop successfully through our joint efforts in promoting universal values and creating the atmosphere of mutual understanding and trust among civilizations."
- Brazil – President Luiz Inácio Lula da Silva tweeted in Portuguese, congratulating Pope Leo XIV on his election and hoping the Pope "continues the legacy of Pope Francis".
  - Alagoas – Governor Paulo Dantas congratulated the new pope, wishing that his "journey be marked by faith and justice".
  - Amazonas – Governor Wilson Lima tweeted in Portuguese wishing "wisdom and good health to Pope Leo XIV".
  - Bahia – Governor Jerônimo Rodrigues welcomed the new pope, wishing him "courage and light in this spiritual mission".
  - Espírito Santo – Governor Renato Casagrande tweeted in Portuguese celebrating the new pope, wishing that "the Holy Spirit guides him with wisdom, balance, and courage to unite the peoples and strengthen the values of love, justice, and peace".
  - Federal District – Governor Ibaneis Rocha published a video and wished that "God would guide Cardinal Robert Francis Prevost with wisdom".
  - Mato Grosso – Governor Mauro Mendes celebrated the new pope and "hopes that the new pontiff will use his voice in defense of peace and human dignity".
  - Minas Gerais – Governor Romeu Zema said "I'm very happy. I always think that different people bring fresh air to institutions. And the Catholic Church gained when, after more than 400 years, John Paul II, who was Polish, was elected; then we had a German pope, Benedict XVI, we had an Argentinian pope, Pope Francis, and now, also for the first time, an American pope. The whole institution benefits, it gets an oxygenation". Also, he mentioned his own history: "I say this based on my own history. I left the company I built, the one I dedicated my whole life to, at age 53 so it could be oxygenated. I had already made my contribution; I think that when new, different minds come in, they can take everything good I did and add something more".
  - Rio Grande do Sul – Governor Eduardo Leite tweeted in Portuguese that Pope Leo XIV "invites us to renew hope in a divided world".
- Canada – Prime Minister Mark Carney said in a public statement, "Canadians offer best wishes to His Holiness Pope Leo XIV as he begins his papacy. At a time of profound global challenges, may his pontificate be marked by wisdom, discernment, a deep commitment to common good, and dignity of all."
- China – Foreign ministry spokesperson Lin Jian issued congratulations on the election of Pope Leo XIV. He also stated that "under the leadership of the new pope, the Vatican will continue to have dialogue with China in a constructive spirit, have in-depth communication on international issues of mutual interest, jointly advance the continuous improvement of the China-Vatican relations and make contributions to world peace, stability, development and prosperity." Two government-affiliated Catholic groups, the Chinese Catholic Patriotic Association and the Bishops' Conference of Catholic Church in China, also congratulated the new Pope on his election.
- Colombia – President Gustavo Petro stated that he hopes that Pope Leo XIV would become a great leader for people with migrant backgrounds around the world, encouraging Colombia's Latin American migrant brothers and sisters, that according to him faced humiliation in the United States under the current government.
- Croatia – Prime Minister Andrej Plenković wrote on X: "On behalf of the Government of the Republic of Croatia and on my own behalf, I extend my heartfelt congratulations to the Holy Father, Pope Leo XIV, on his election as the new head of the Holy See and the Catholic Church. We join the faithful around the world in praying for His Holiness, wishing him a long, fruitful and blessed pontificate."
- Czech Republic – Prime Minister Petr Fiala expressed joy of the election of the new pope and wished him "strength, wisdom and courage". President Petr Pavel sent congratulation to the pope and invited him to visit the country.
- Ecuador – President Daniel Noboa tweeted in Spanish, welcoming Leo as the new Pope "with hope in our hearts".
- European Union – European Council president António Costa, European Commission president Ursula von der Leyen, and European Parliament president Roberta Metsola all sent congratulatory messages to the new Pope.
- Finland – President Alexander Stubb congratulated the new pope, "My warmest congratulations to Leo XIV, Robert Francis Prevost, on his election as Pope and head of the Catholic Church. The voice of Catholic Church is heard all over the world. May peace and dialogue remain at the core of your mission."
- France – President Emmanuel Macron congratulated the new Pope with a message that said: "To Pope Leo XIV, and to all Catholics in France and around the world, I extend a message of fraternity."
- Germany – Chancellor Friedrich Merz congratulated the newly elected Pope, saying that through his role, he would provide "hope and guidance to millions of believers around the world in these challenging times".
- Greece – Prime Minister Kyriakos Mitsotakis gave his congratulations online, highlighting the importance of the new Pope's leadership during "a time when the world faces profound challenges".
- India – Prime Minister Narendra Modi offered his "sincere felicitations and best wishes" for the new head of the Catholic Church via a tweet.
- Indonesia – President Prabowo Subianto via Minister of the State Secretariat Prasetyo Hadi congratulated the newly elected Pope, adding that the president himself would soon issue an official statement.
- Ireland – President Michael D. Higgins said, "I send Pope Leo my very best wishes as he begins his pontificate, and I welcome his statement that he is prepared to lead with compassion."
- Israel – Prime Minister Benjamin Netanyahu congratulated Pope Leo XIV, expressing hope that he would foster "reconciliation among all faiths". President Isaac Herzog stated that Israel would "look forward to enhancing the relationship between Israel and the Holy See, and strengthening the friendship between Jews and Christians in the Holy Land and around the world".
- Iraq – Iraqi President Abdul Latif Rashid and Prime Minister Mohammed Shia al-Sudani extended their congratulations to Pope, stating that they "wish him success in championing peace and strengthening the values of peaceful coexistence among the peoples of the world."
  - Iraqi Kurdistan – Kurdistan Region Minister of Transport and Communications, Ano Jawhar Abdoka, issued a statement welcoming the election of Pope Leo XIV as the new head of the Catholic Church and suggesting that the new Pope should "remember the Christians of the East, from the historic churches of Ankawa and Erbil to the communities across Nineveh, Zakho, Duhok, and Alqos", referring to both Kurds and Assyrians in the area.
- Italy – Prime Minister Giorgia Meloni stated that "in a time marked by conflict and unrest, his words from the Loggia of Benedictions are a powerful call to peace, brotherhood and responsibility".
- Lebanon – President Joseph Aoun congratulated the newly-elected pope and stated that he hoped the new pontiff would "strengthen dialogue between religions and cultures".
- Malaysia – Prime Minister Anwar Ibrahim called the election of Pope Leo XIV "a historic occasion" and expressed confidence that it would bring renewed purpose and inspiration to the global Catholic community. He also emphasized Malaysia's valued relationship with the Holy See, highlighting hopes for continued engagement rooted in mutual respect, dialogue and a shared commitment to peace and human dignity.
- Mexico – President Claudia Sheinbaum praised Pope Leo's values "in favor of world peace and prosperity".
- Morocco – King Mohammed VI congratulated Pope Leo, highlighting relations between the Holy See and Morocco, which he said were "united by an unwavering commitment to peace and the principles of living together".
- Peru – President Dina Boluarte congratulated the new pope and highlighted his "Evil will not prevail" speech. Members of the Peruvian Congress also congratulated the new pope.
- Philippines – President Bongbong Marcos congratulated the newly elected Pope, stating, "The Filipino people are also praying for the new pope's strength and good health as he leads the faithful with grace, wisdom and compassion."
- Poland – President Andrzej Duda asked the Pope to "accept the assurance of the readiness of the Republic of Poland to further strengthen" its "unique bonds—in the name of shared values, responsibility for the common good and the strengthening of peace in the world".
- Portugal – Prime Minister Luís Montenegro wished that the Pope's pontificate would be "filled with light, humanism and universalism", adding that he hoped that the Pope and the Holy See would be heard on their calls "peace, empathy, compassion and comprehension". President Marcelo Rebelo de Sousa also congratulated the newly elected Pope, highlighting his "great concern for peace" and calling for the continuation of "the ancient, historic, fundamental relations between the church and Portugal and the role of the Catholic Church throughout human history".
- Russia – President Vladimir Putin stated that he was "confident that the constructive dialogue and cooperation established between Russia and the Vatican" would "continue to develop on the basis of the Christian values" that unite the two nations.
- Saudi Arabia – King Salman and Crown Prince Mohammed bin Salman congratulated Pope Leo XIV on his election as the new leader of the Catholic church, sending "congratulatory telegrams to Pope Leo XIV on the occasion of his election as Pope of the Vatican".
- Singapore – Prime Minister Lawrence Wong congratulated Pope Leo on Facebook, acknowledging that the "longstanding and warm relations" between Singapore and the Holy See are built on "a shared interest in promoting peace and interfaith understanding", and praised the Catholic Church work in Singapore "to serve the underprivileged, to help foster a spirit of inclusiveness, and to encourage interreligious dialogue". President Tharman Shanmugaratnam also congratulated Pope Leo, valuing the contributions of the Catholic Church to the country's national development which played a role in multiracialism and the provision of education, healthcare, and social services.
- Spain – Prime Minister Pedro Sánchez wished that the Pope's pontificate would "contribute to strengthening dialogue and the defense of human rights in a world that needs hope and unity."
- South Africa – President Cyril Ramaphosa commented that "Pope Leo XIV's early emphasis on peace is a call that resonates with most of humanity and is one that honors the legacy of the late Pope Francis".
- Sweden – Prime Minister Ulf Kristersson tweeted "Habemus Papam! On behalf of the Swedish Government, my sincere congratulations to His Holiness Leo XIV on his election as head of the Catholic Church. We wish him strength and courage in continuing to promote human dignity, dialogue, peace and unity of a just world."
- Republic of China (Taiwan) (Note: For the status of Taiwan, see: De facto and de jure states, Political status of Taiwan, List of sovereign states#Taiwan, and List of states with limited recognition) – President Lai Ching-te congratulated the new pope via the foreign ministry. He also tweeted, "We look forward to building on our diplomatic ties with the Holy See, 83 years strong, to advance peace, justice, solidarity, and benevolence."
- Turkey – President Recep Tayyip Erdoğan congratulated the new pope in a statement, saying: "I am fully confident that we will continue the sincere and constructive dialogue we established with Pope Francis with you as well. It is my sincere belief that further advancing the relations between Türkiye and the Vatican will make a significant contribution to strengthening tolerance on the international arena and to ending humanitarian tragedies, especially in Gaza."
- Ukraine – President Volodymyr Zelenskyy stated that "at this decisive moment for Ukraine", the nation hopes for the "continued moral and spiritual support of the Vatican in Ukraine's efforts to restore justice and achieve a lasting peace".
- United Kingdom – Prime Minister Keir Starmer highlighted that "the election of Pope Leo XIV is a deeply profound moment of joy for Catholics in the United Kingdom and globally, and begins a new chapter for the leadership of the Church and in the world". Buckingham Palace said that King Charles III had sent "most sincere good wishes for his pontificate".
- United States – President Donald Trump posted a message on Truth Social, congratulating Leo XIV for being the first American pope and expressing interest in meeting him soon. He also described the election of an American pope as "a great honor" for the United States. Vice President JD Vance, who is a Catholic convert, congratulated Leo XIV via a tweet, adding that he is sure "millions of American Catholics and other Christians will pray for his successful work leading the Church." Former Presidents Joe Biden (the second Catholic U.S. president), Barack Obama (a fellow Chicagoan and a U.S. Senator from Illinois before becoming president), George W. Bush, and Bill Clinton, as well as former Vice President Kamala Harris, also congratulated the new pope.
  - Illinois – Governor JB Pritzker congratulated the new pope.
    - Chicago – Mayor Brandon Johnson congratulated the new pope by tweeting: "Everything dope, including the Pope, comes from Chicago!"
- Uruguay – President Yamandú Orsi congratulated the election of Leo XIV, highlighting his "chosen" connection with Latin America. Meanwhile, the Ministry of Foreign Relations issued a statement expressing the hope that his pontificate "contributes to world peace and sets an example, spreading goodwill, hope, solidarity, generosity, and social justice".
- Vietnam – President Lương Cường sent a message of congratulations on the election of Pope Leo XIV, expressing hope for continuation of the legacy of Pope Francis.

== Media ==
- The Chicago Sun-Times's banner headline, accompanied by a full-page photograph of Leo XIV, read "DA POPE!", in reference to "Da Bears" – the Chicago Bears of the National Football League, whose pronunciation in an exaggerated mid-western Chicago accent was also popularized by "Bill Swerski's Superfans" from Saturday Night Live.

== Sport ==
- The Chicago White Sox of Major League Baseball, which Leo XIV supported according to his brother John in an interview with WGN-TV, shipped a jersey and hat to him and announced plans to honor him while also putting on the scoreboard at Rate Field, "Hey Chicago, He's a Sox Fan!" after the Chicago Cubs had done similarly on the marquee at Wrigley Field, initially when news reports and rumors erroneously described Leo as a Cubs fan. The Chicago Sun-Times also received a photograph of the Pope attending the 2005 World Series against the Houston Astros, which the White Sox swept to win their first championship in 88 years, and it was also discovered that he was shown on the FOX broadcast in the top of the 9th inning of Game 1. The following June, A. J. Pierzynski, the starting catcher from the 2005 White Sox, gifted the ball from the final out of Game 1 to Leo XIV while visiting the Vatican.

== Education ==
- Father Peter M. Donohue, president of Villanova University, told Today that he screamed when he heard the news. He also said of Leo XIV, "He’s very simple. He’s very gentle. He’s not boastful at all. He’s a very intelligent man." Leo XIV had graduated from Villanova – one of two Augustinian universities in the United States, making it the first American university where a pope had studied – in 1977 and had also had an honorary additional decree conferred on him by the university.

== Other ==
=== Religious figures ===
- The Dalai Lama congratulated Pope Leo XIV in a statement, saying that his election to the papacy "brings new hope not just to the Catholic community, but to people everywhere who are seeking a happier life in a more compassionate, peaceful world".
- Ahmed el-Tayeb, who is the Grand Imam of al-Azhar, and the World Jewish Congress also congratulated the new pope.
- The leaders of The Church of Jesus Christ of Latter-day Saints wrote that "as fellow followers of Jesus Christ, we look forward to continued opportunities to work together to bless the lives of God's children everywhere. May we strive to follow the example of Jesus Christ to care for the poor and needy, become peacemakers and create a world where faith and goodness can flourish."
- Patriarch Kirill of Moscow, the Primate of the Russian Orthodox Church, congratulated the new Pope, expressing hope for the development of relations between the churches.
- Ecumenical Patriarch Bartholomew I of the Eastern Orthodox Church remembered that Leo XIII stood out for his social teachings, and looked forward to their advancing Christian unity. He also extended the invitation, originally given to Pope Francis, to visit Nicaea (now İznik, Turkey) to mark the 1,700th Anniversary of the First Council of Nicaea.
- Stephen Cottrell, the Archbishop of York and Acting Primate of the Church of England, spoke of "sharing in the great joy of our Roman Catholic brothers and sisters" and commended Leo XIV's "many years of pastoral experience, his commitment to justice, and his deep spirituality".
- The World Council of Churches congratulated Pope Leo XIV, with its general secretary Jerry Pillay stating: "We trust that he would continue to strengthen ecumenical collaboration, Christian unity, justice and peace in the world. We live in a world of multiple crises; together we can make a difference through the transformative power of the Holy Spirit."
