= Gathering of Justice and Unity =

Iraqi political coalition

The Gathering of Justice and Unity (list 269/710) (also known as Amir al-Fayiz) is a political coalition that contested the 2009 Basra governorate election and is registered for the 2014 Iraqi legislative election. The list is led by Al-Faiz, the head of the Awlad Amir sub-tribe which is predominantly from the Shaykhiyya religious group.

They won 2 out of 35 seats.

They are registered for the 2014 general election under the name Amir al-Fayiz.
