= Ablahad Afraim Sawa =

Iraqi Assyrian politician

- أبلحد أفرام ساوا

Member of Iraqi Parliament
- In office 2006–2010
- President: Mahmoud al-Mashhadani, Ayad al-Samarrai
- Vice President: Nouri al-Maliki

Personal details
- Born: 1948 (age 77–78) Nohadra, Iraq
- Party: Chaldean Democratic Party
- Occupation: Writer

Ablahad Afraim Sawa (Arabic: أبلحد أفرام ساوا) is an Iraqi Assyrian politician and former member of the National Assembly of Iraq. He was elected as part of the Democratic Alliance of Kurdistan, which had helped his political party, the Chaldean Democratic Union Party to begin operation.

As the founder and the face of the CDP, he was elected to the Iraqi parliament in the January 2005 and December 2005 elections.

== Early life ==
Sawa was born in 1948 in the Mar Yaqoub village in the Duhok Governorate, and was a writer before he began his political career.

== Career ==
On the eve of the US invasion of Iraq, Sawa founded the Chaldean Democratic Union Party with the help of the Kurdistan Democratic Party and Chaldean National Congress.

Sawa has previously commented on the restrictions that minority political parties faced in Iraq after the invasion, stating that they were given very few resources and even had to withdraw from elections at a point because of a lack of funding. Additionally, Sawa has previously contested Kurdish influence on Assyrian politics in Iraq, despite him winning a seat through the Kurdish bloc, claiming that the micro-minority status of Assyrians in Iraq made him feel like a second class citizen in the country. His comments were published through various WikiLeaks articles in the mid to late 2000s, and he would continue to comment against outside electoral interference in Assyrian politics in Iraq.

Sawa has also expressed skepticism over proposals for Assyrian autonomy in Iraq, arguing that without a heavily protected border, Assyrians could be left open to violent Islamic extremism. His party has rarely worked with other Assyrian political parties outside though who espouse a sectarian Chaldean identity, and in 2012, he wrote an accusatory letter addressed to Yonadam Kanna and the Assyrian Democratic Movement.

=== Electoral history ===
Sawa, under the CDP, won the January 2005 and December 2005 Iraqi parliamentary elections, both of which were won with support from the KDP. In 2009, the CDP under his leadership won the Iraqi governorate elections for the seat in Basra. His wins, however, were criticized due to the sectarian nature of the CDP compared to the rest of the Assyrian community, as well as due to the support received from the KDP.

== Bibliography ==
- Hanna, Reine; Joseph, Max (27 November 2018). Iraq's Stolen Election: How Assyrian Representation Became Assyrian Repression (PDF) (Report). Assyrian Policy Institute.
- Salloum, Saad (January 2016). Political Participation of Minorities in Iraq (PDF) (Report). Heartland Alliance International. Archived from the original (PDF) on 9 August 2021.
- Teule, Herman G. B. (2012). "Christians in Iraq: An Analysis of Some Recent Political Developments" (PDF). Der Islam. 88 (1): 179–198. doi:10.1515/islam-2011-0010. hdl:2066/101464.
- Woźniak-Bobińska, Marta (2020). Modern Assyrian/Syriac Diaspora in Sweden. Katedra Bliskiego Wschodu i Północnej Afryki Uniwersytet Łódzki. doi:10.18778/63547-11-0. ISBN 9788363547110.
- Yakoub, Afram (January 2009). Violations and other threats against Assyrians during pre-election period in Nineveh Plain (PDF) (Report). Archived from the original (PDF) on 23 October 2012.

== See also ==
- Chaldean Democratic Party
- Assyrian politics in Iraq
