= Assyrian Confederation of Europe =

- Established: 22 April 2016, in Brussels, Belgium
- Headquarters: Brussels, Belgium
- Members: 4 groups (Assyrian national federations)
- Website: http://www.assyrianconfederation.eu

The Assyrian Confederation of Europe (ACE) is a European umbrella organisation for Assyrian national federations and organisations in Europe. It was formed on 22 April 2016 in Brussels, Belgium. The Brussels office was opened in April 2018. ACE works to connect and represent half a million Europeans of Assyrian descent.

== History ==
The longstanding idea of setting up a pan-European umbrella for Assyrian organisations was materialised in 2016. The establishment of ACE was formally announced in the European parliament in Brussels on 22 April.

The organization is the European counterpart of the United States-based Assyrian Policy Institute, with whom the ACE regularly cooperates.

== Aims ==
ACE is mainly dedicated to three aims:

- Promotion of Assyrian identity and culture in Europe
- Representation of Assyrians of Europe in politics and media
- Support for efforts in Assyria for democracy and equal rights

== Members ==
- Fédération des Assyriens de Belgique (Original Member)
- Zentralverband der Assyrischen Vereinigungen in Deutschland und Europäischen Sektionen e.V. (Original Member)
- Assyriska Riksförbundet Sverige (Original Member)
- Assyrische Federatie Nederland (Joined in October 2016)

== See also ==
- History of the Assyrian people
- Assyrians in Belgium
