= Christian Alliance (Iraq) =

- Leader: Ano Abdoka
- Founded: May 11, 2024
- Preceded by: Hammurabi Coalition
- Ideology: Christian minority politics

The Christian Alliance is a political alliance of eight political parties in Iraq that represent the Christians in Iraq. The alliance comprises these eight parties:

- Chaldean Democratic Union Party
- Chaldean National Congress
- Syriac Assembly Movement
- Chaldean Global Association
- Shlama Movement
- International Chaldean League
- Administrative Body of the Armenian Orthodox Church
- Armenian Association

It is the successor of the Hammurabi Coalition expanded by Armenian groups. Most of the members are close to the Kurdistan Democratic Party.

In February 2025, it called for greater autonomy on security for Christian and Yazidi communities in the Nineveh Plain and for an electoral reform for fair representation. In July 2025, the Alliance called the Iraqi government to intervene against the presence of militias in the Nineveh Plains.
