= Luis Caro Bandar =

Iraqi politician

Luis Caro Bandar Mansoor (Arabic: النائب لويس كارو بندر منصور) is an outgoing parliament member of Iraq. Luis was elected in the parliament as part of the Chaldean Syriac Assyrian Popular Council in the 2010 and 2014 elections. He was born in 1954 the village of Avzrog, in the Slevani sub-district of Duhok Governorate.
