= Assyrian exodus from Iraq =

Ethnic minority exodus from Iraq

The Assyrian exodus from Iraq refers to the mass flight and expulsion of ethnic Assyrians from Iraq, a process which was initiated from the beginning of Iraq War in 2003 and continues to this day. Leaders of Iraq's Assyrian community estimate that over two-thirds of the Iraqi Assyrian population may have fled the country or been internally displaced since the U.S.-led invasion in 2003 until 2011. Reports suggest that whole neighborhoods of Assyrians have cleared out in the cities of Baghdad and Basra, and that Sunni insurgent groups and militias have threatened Assyrians. Following the campaign of the Islamic State of Iraq and the Levant in northern Iraq in August 2014, one quarter of the remaining Iraqi Assyrians fled the Jihadists, finding refuge in Turkey and Kurdistan Region.

The Guardian published that the violence faced by Assyrians has led to a drop in their numbers in Iraq from at least 800,000 in 2003 to 400,000 in 2011. The 2009 Catholic Almanac puts the numbers much higher—a drop from 1.5 million mostly Assyrians in Iraq in 2003 to just 500,000 in 2009. Some estimate the updated number of Assyrians in Iraq at just 300,000. The UN High Commission for Refugees estimated in 2007 that one third of 1.8 million Iraqi refugees were Assyrians. A similar percentage of the 1.6 million internally displaced within Iraq in 2007 were likely Assyrians, many of whom had fled Baghdad, Basra, and Mosul to the relatively stable Kurdistan Region.

== Background ==
A 1950 CIA report on Iraq showed that Assyrians comprised 4.9% of the Iraqi population during the 1940s.

Total population	Chaldean Catholic	Syriac Catholic	Syriac Orthodox	Assyrian Church of the East
165,000	98,000	25,000	12,000	30,000

The report goes on and states 20% of the Assyrians live in Baghdad and 60% in Mosul.

The Iraqi Minorities Council and the Minority Rights Group International estimated that Iraq's pre-war Assyrian population was 800,000.

== Timeline ==
=== During Iraq War (2003–2011) ===
Assyrians in post-Ba'athist Iraq have faced high rate of persecution by fundamentalist Sunnis since the beginning of the Iraq War. By early August 2004 this persecution included church bombings, and fundamentalist groups' enforcement of Muslim codes of behavior upon Christians, e.g., banning alcohol, forcing women to wear hijab. The violence against the community has led to the exodus of perhaps as much as half of the community. While Assyrians only made just over 5% of the total Iraqi population before the war, according to the United Nations, Assyrians are over-represented among the Iraqi refugees (as much as 13%) who are stranded in Syria, Jordan, Lebanon, and Turkey.

=== During Iraqi insurgency (2011–2017) ===
By 2011, a large number of Assyrians had found refuge in their villages in Nineveh Plains and the Kurdistan Region. This led some Assyrians and Iraqi and foreign politicians to call for an Assyrian autonomous region in those areas.

Starting from 2013, however, the rise of the Islamic State of Iraq and the Levant led to ethnic cleansing of the Assyrian people, including Assyrian refugees, in Iraq and Syria. This intensified following their Northern Iraq offensive in mid 2014. Most of the land that ISIS conquered in Northern Iraq was part of the Nineveh Plains, which had been the only area left in Iraq that was safe for the Assyrians. By August 2014, the Christian population of the Nineveh Plains was reduced by 60%, and almost all of the main population centers of the region were lost to ISIS.
