= Proposals for Assyrian autonomy in Iraq =

Political proposals

Since the early 20th century several proposals have been made for the establishment of an autonomous area or an independent state for the Syriac-speaking modern Assyrians in northern Iraq.

== Historical proposals ==
- Urmia Manifesto of the United Free Assyria, 1917
- League of Nations proposed settlement for Assyrians, 1935
- United Nations Assyrian National Petition, 1945
- Bet-Nahrain Democratic Party case for Assyrian autonomy

== Current proposals ==
The Nineveh Plains within Nineveh province

=== 19th governorate ===
Currently, two major Assyrian parties (Assyrian Democratic Movement and Chaldean Syriac Assyrian Popular Council) call for a creation of a 19th governorate which will incorporate Shekhan, Al-Hamdaniya and Tel Keppe districts of Ninawa Governorate. This proposal is pushed by two above mentioned parties as a new governorate for all minorities living there. Various estimates say that new province population will have the following ethno-religious makeup:

During June, 2017, a conference was held in Brussels dubbed, The Future for Christians in Iraq. The conference was organised by the European People's Party and had participants extending from Assyrian/Chaldean/Syriac organizations, including representatives from the Iraqi government and the KRG. The conference was boycotted by the Assyrian Democratic Movement, Sons of Mesopotamia, Assyrian Patriotic Party, Chaldean Catholic Church and Assyrian Church of the East. A position paper was signed by the remaining political organizations involved.

Support – The proposal has been backed by the majority of Shia Arabs and Kurdish parties.

- Jalal Talabani, President of Iraq
- Sadrist Members of Parliament block
- Islamic Dawa Party block of Iraqi Prime Minister Nouri al-Maliki
- The three main Syriac Christian Bishops in the area, One Syriac Catholic, and two Syriac Orthodox, in 2017, came out in support of the idea of a protected area for Syriac Christians. Though the Patriarch has stated the priority should be other concerns.

Some foreign governments and political parties have also weighed in on the issue:

- The Swedish political party Folkpartiet declared full support of an Assyrian administration by means of activating Article 125.
- The Australian Federal Government through the Labor, Liberal & Christian Democratic Party support an autonomous Assyrian state in Iraq.

Oppose – It has been opposed by Sunni Arabs who make up the majority of the city of Mosul.

- Al-Hadba
- Justice and Reform Movement (Sunni Arab)

=== Assyrian Administrative Region ===
Some Assyrian organizations also call for a creation of an Assyrian Administrative Region in Northern Iraq, which would include the following districts:

Ninawa Governorate

- Al-Hamdaniya
- Al-Shekhan
- Tel Keppe

Dohuk Governorate

- Simele
- Nahla Valley
- Peshkhabur
- Sapna Valley

Several Assyrian political parties convened to sign a position paper on 6 March 2017 relating to the future of the Nineveh Plains. The position paper called for the creation of a Nineveh Plains province that is self-governed by the Assyrian population of the Nineveh Plain.

=== Incorporation with Kurdistan region ===
Many Kurdish politicians have publicly come out in support of annexing the area to the Kurdistan Regional Government as their fifth governorate (after Dohuk, Erbil and Slemani, and Halabja). Some Assyrians claim Masoud Barzani's KDP is intimidating the population into demanding their region be annexed.

Some Assyrian political parties have called for the establishment of an Assyrian-governed Nineveh Plains province as part of the KRG. The province would include the districts of Tel Keppe District, Al-Hamdaniya and Shekhan, and would be governed by the local Assyrian population of the region. Parts of the Nineveh Plain have been illegally annexed and been under the jurisdiction of the KRG and Peshmerga, leading to the inclusion of sections of the Nineveh Plain as a "disputed area" and thus the KRG referendum, 2017 will take place in this occupied territory.

=== Al-Rafidain Autonomous Region ===
On March 5, 2017, three bodies representing Assyrians, Yazidis and Turkmen issued a joint statement calling for a semi-autonomous region in Northern Iraq. The idea was pushed forward by the Turkmen Rescue Foundation, Yazidi Independent Supreme Council and the Al-Rafidain Organization.

The project was proposed in line with Iraq's 2005 Constitution, which gives minorities the right to autonomy or self-administration in sub-units of territory (Chapter 1; Sections 5, 112, 115 and 116).

“The proposal of a region for the minorities is in line with the Iraqi Constitution and doesn’t contradict the general move to share powers and or let minorities manage their own affairs”, said Ali Akram Al-Bayati of the Turkmen Rescue Foundation.

The canton would comprise three continuous regions: Sinjar, Tal Afar and the Nineveh Plain.

== See also ==
- Assyrian independence movement
- Assyrian nationalism
- Assyrian people
- Assyrian homeland
- Assyrian Policy Institute
- Beth Nahrain
- Assyrian diaspora
- Assyrian genocide
- List of Assyrian tribes
- Urmia Manifesto of the United Free Assyria
