= Beth Nahrin Patriotic Union =

- Founded: 1996
- Headquarters: Slemani
- Ideology: Assyrian nationalism Dawronoye
- Political position: Left-wing
- National affiliation: Athra Alliance
- Regional affiliation: MUB

Beth Nahrin Patriotic Union (Arabic: الاتحاد الوطني بيت نهرين) is an Assyrian political party founded in 1996, in the Slemani area of Iraq, as part of the Dawronoye movement. Since the 2003 Iraq War, the party has taken part in the country's elections, but has failed to ever win a seat. It is the Iraqi branch of Bethnahrin National Council.

On July 22, 2023 the party joined the Athra Alliance, a political alliance representing Assyrian interests in Iraq.
