= Assyrian Policy Institute =

Assyrian advocacy group

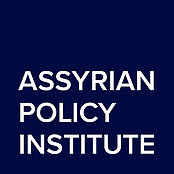
- Abbreviation: API
- Type: Non-governmental organization
- Purpose: Assyrian advocacy
- Headquarters: Washington, DC
- Website: https://www.assyrianpolicy.org/

The Assyrian Policy Institute (API) is a non-governmental and nonprofit organization based in the United States that primarily advocates for the rights of Assyrians and other minorities in the Middle East including Yazidis and Mandaeans.

== Early history ==
The API was founded in 2018 in order to effectively represent worldwide Assyrian interests in Washington. Shortly after the founding of the organization, the API further clarified its purpose, stating:

"Our work will focus on fostering public awareness about issues affecting Assyrians in their ancestral lands, guiding U.S. policy on matters related to Assyrians in countries like Iraq and Syria, and publishing authoritative reports that are valuable to academics and policymakers."

== Advocacy by country ==
The API maintains a list of Middle Eastern countries that contain a sizable Assyrian population and outlines a list of recommendations for the country in question to implement in order to protect the rights of its Assyrian population.

=== Iraq ===
The API's recommendations for Iraq are:

- "Establishment of a Nineveh Plain Province for minoritized communities
- Restoration of the Nineveh Plain after IS
- Development of Assyrian-led security
- Prevention of land theft and forced demographic change
- Access to the full-spectrum of state-provided services
- Protection of freedom of speech"

The API has accused the Iraqi government of failing to include provisions in its constitution that legally protect minorities from political discrimination.

On January 20, 2020, the API reported that four humanitarian workers from the France-based Christian nonprofit SOS Chrétiens d'Orient were missing in Baghdad, Iraq. One of the reported missing workers was a man named Tareq Khidr Mattoka, a French Assyrian from the town of Bakhdida. No person or group ever claimed responsibility for the disappearance or asked for a ransom. According to a statement released by SOS Chrétiens d'Orient via Twitter, the four workers were released on March 26, 2020.

On October 31, 2018, the API released a statement commemorating the eighth anniversary of the Our Lady of Salvation Church Massacre.

==== Business discrimination ====
The API has also accused the Kurdistan Regional Government (KRG) in Iraq of multiple discriminatory business practices. One report claimed that the KRG required all business owners from the Assyrian-majority city of Ankawa, located in the Erbil Governorate, to renew their business licenses with the Erbil Center District for a fee. The alleged regulation applied exclusively to Ankawa, despite the fact that nine other districts were under the Erbil Center District's jurisdiction. There were also allegations that the renewal process was deliberately lengthy and expensive, and that KRG officials expected bribes in exchange for processing the renewals. Many Assyrians viewed this as an attempt by the KRG to hurt their businesses and secure a monopoly on industries in their areas of control.

The KRG later released an official statement in which they denied these allegations and referred to them as “baseless.”

The API responded to the KRG's denial of these claims in a later report. The API claimed that this latest denial of human rights abuses by the KRG is consistent with previous denial of accusations of wrongdoing. Examples of this that the API provided was the KRG's denial of accusations made by Human Rights Watch, Amnesty International, and the US Department of State Human Rights Report. The report goes on to say that the reason that the API had originally made the claim about the KRG tax policy was due to an Ankawa-based activist group called Hand in Hand approaching them and explaining the situation to them. The report also provided documentation the ordinance in question that proved that a new tax policy specifically in Ankawa had been created by the KRG.

The report then says that Assyrian business-owners affected by the new tax policy as well as Assyrian parliamentarians in the Iraqi Parliament and the Kurdistan Region Parliament who corroborated these claims. Some business-owners attempted to legally appeal the policy, but the government upheld its decision.

Furthermore, the report claimed that the Assyrian parliamentarians who were interviewed about the new tax policy claimed that they had inquired to the KRG Shura Council about the policy, and received a response saying:

"Not collecting this tax in some towns as a result of negligence or incompetence of the relevant KRG departments is no reason to refrain from collecting such a tax in said towns [Ankawa]."

The API claimed that this was essentially a public admission by the KRG that the tax collection policy was arbitrary.

The report concluded that the tax rate was imposed on the city of Ankawa as an act of business discrimination against one of the only Assyrian-majority areas in KRG jurisdiction. They encouraged the KRG to formally accept their role in this policy, and claimed that they, “[stand] ready to meet with KRG officials both in Iraq and in the United States to address the many long-standing grievances of Ankawa residents, including the improper confiscation of lands belonging to Assyrians and KRG policies advancing demographic change in the area, as well as interference in local, regional, and federal elections for Assyrian representatives.”

==== Treatment of journalists ====
On June 17, 2019, Kurdish Asayish authorities in Dohuk detained an Assyrian journalist named Hormuz Mushi without any charges pressed against him. The API alleged that he was being detained due to his reporting of the negligence of Assyrian cultural sites by the KRG. The API urged KRG authorities to release Mushi. The arrest was also condemned by Assyrian parliamentarian Fareed Yaqoob.

In November 2019, the API reported that Kurdish authorities had detained an Assyrian journalist named William Bnyameen Adam for nearly two weeks following a report on his recent trip to Syria. An earlier statement claimed that Adam and his family had previously received death threats from members of the Kurdistan Democratic Party as a result of his criticism of high-ranking KRG officials.

=== Syria ===
The API's recommendations for Syria are:

- "Ending the war in Syria and rebuilding the Syrian state
- Rehabilitation of the Khabour Region
- Protection of Assyrian property rights
- Recognition of Assyrians as one of the constituent peoples of Syria
- Protection of freedom of speech"

In 2018, the API urged the Autonomous Administration of North and East Syria to release Assyrian journalist Souleman Yusph. API stated that Yusph was imprisoned by Kurdish forces in Syria for reporting on alleged human rights violations enacted by Kurdish authorities in Syria. This included forced closures of Assyrian schools, intimidation and imprisonment of rivals, and the severe beating of Isa Rashid, an Assyrian education director who worked for some of the closed Assyrian schools. Yusph was also critical of the Dawronoye movement and posted videos on his personal Facebook page showing individuals tied to the movement forcefully closing schools and intimidating residents.

The API also further reported on the Administration's 2018 forced closure of Assyrian schools in its areas of control. Specifically, the API alleged that Kurdish and Dawronoye affiliated authorities had forcefully broken and replaced locks in schools and fired all of their staff without warning. From 1935 until then, these schools had operated under the control of the Syriac Orthodox Church and taught the Syriac language to their students. The API stated that this was an effort by the PYD to "impose a Kurdish nationalist curriculum onto all areas it governs." The forced closures were condemned by the Assyrian Democratic Organization and eventually led to widespread protests by Assyrian civilians in the area.

=== Turkey ===
The API's recommendations for Turkey are:

- "Recognition of Assyrians as an ethnic minority in Turkey
- Return of Assyrian properties confiscated by Turkish officials
- Protection of religious freedom
- Ending arbitrary detentions and restrictions on free speech
- Equal access to education for Assyrian students
- Recognition of the 1915 Armenian, Greek, and Assyrian genocide
- Living conditions and well-being of refugees"

The API has condemned the government of Turkey for its denial of its role in the Assyrian genocide.

The API released a statement condemning the Turkish government's arrest of an Assyrian priest named Sefer Aho Bileçen who was caught providing water and bread to members of the outlawed PKK. The priest was charged with terrorism as a result.

In 2020, the API released a statement of concern regarding the disappearance of Assyrian couple Hurmuz and Şimoni Diril. The couple were abducted outside of their home in the village of Meer, in the Şirnak Province of Turkey. Their disappearance was first reported by their son Ramzi Diril, a Chaldean Catholic priest. The couple were reported to be some of the last Assyrians living in Meer, a historically Assyrian village that was evacuated twice in both 1989 and 1992 due to heightened conflict between the Turkish government and the PKK. On January 25, 2020, an eyewitness claimed that the couple was abducted by members of the PKK. On March 3, 2020, Şimoni's body was found with no cause of death apparent. As of June 29, 2020, Hurmiz Diril's whereabouts are still unknown.

==== Turkish airstrikes ====
The API reported on the 2018 Turkish airstrikes in Iraq. Specifically, the API claimed that these airstrikes happened in villages that are mostly inhabited by Assyrians. The Turkish government's intended targets for these airstrikes were members of the PKK who had taken refuge in northern Iraq. The airstrikes led to the deaths of at least seven non-combatants, which the Human Rights Watch claimed could be considered a violation of the laws of war.

The API also released a statement of condemnation following the 2019 Turkish offensive into north-eastern Syria. Specifically, they condemned the “indiscriminate airstrikes” conducted by Turkey onto Assyrian civilians in the city of Qamishli, a town founded by Assyrian genocide survivors in 1915. The statement went on to address Assyrian civilian casualties and properties owned by Assyrians that were destroyed in the airstrikes. The report concluded by claiming that Turkey, “has consistently abetted ISIS throughout the Syria conflict through its open border policy, provision of weapons to questionable groups, and other practices. American withdrawal allows Turkish-supported extremism to be reasserted in the area.”

=== Iran ===
The API's recommendations for Iran are:

- "Protection of religious freedom
- Achieving full participation for Assyrians in civil and political life
- Protection of Assyrian property rights
- Linguistic freedom for Assyrians and other minorities
- Ending economic neglect of minority-populated regions
- Ending restrictions on freedom of speech"

In 2018, API Board Chairman Jon Koriel sent a letter to the Chief Justice of Iran, Sadiq Larijani and the Prosecutor General of Tehran, Abbas Ja’fari Dolat Abadi urging them to overturn the convictions of four Christians, including Assyrian couple Pastor Victor Bet Tamraz and Shamiran Issavi, who were previously arrested for "illegal church activities" which “threaten national security." The activities were clarified by Amnesty International as being typical Christian religious practices, including attending Christmas gatherings and organizing house churches. In July 2020, the API reported that the appeal was denied by the Iranian judiciary, and the court upheld the couples' respective 10-year and 5-year prison sentences. In August 2020, the couple fled the country seeking asylum elsewhere. However, they were otherwise "safe and well" according to their daughter Dabrina in an interview with the API.

The API has criticized the Iran-backed Popular Mobilization Forces for refusing to comply with the Iraqi Prime Minister's July 2019 order to have Brigade 30 and the Babylon Brigades withdraw from Hamdaniya District and Tel Keppe District in the Nineveh Plains.

=== Jordan ===
The API's Recommendations for Jordan are:

- "Repatriation of Assyrian refugees who wish to return home
- Increased humanitarian aid to Assyrian refugee families
- Access to work permits for refugees
- Access to education for refugee children"

The challenges facing Assyrian refugees in Jordan were the subject of a June 2019 API report titled Lives on Hold: Assyrian Refugees in Jordan.

=== Lebanon ===
The API's Recommendations for Lebanon are:

- "Repatriation of Assyrian refugees who wish to return home"

In July 2020, the API held an emergency meeting open to all community-members to discuss the living situation of Assyrians in Lebanon. Panelists included Beirut-based Cor-Bishop Yatron Koliana, Acting Head of the Assyrian Church of the East in Lebanon, and Jack Jendo, board member of the Assyrian Support Committee (a Lebanon-based Assyrian charity affiliated with the Assyrian Church of the East).

The panelists claimed that Assyrian refugees in Lebanon face unique problems in the era of economic-downturn, anti-corruption protests, and the COVID-19 pandemic. This was said to be due to their distinct ethnic and religious background. They claimed that Assyrian refugees ruled out the idea settling refugee camps due to fear of discrimination targeting Christians in these camps. This has led them to seek other forms of private shelter, which often have costs of rental, food, water, utilities, and healthcare, which many Assyrian refugees are unable to pay themselves. Previous reliance on remittances from abroad to pay these costs is also not a possibility, due to the global economic crisis caused by the pandemic. Assyrians who wish to leave these conditions for another country are unable to do so due to travel restrictions as a result of the pandemic and the economic instability that came with being a refugee.

== Other activities ==
=== Nineveh Plain Protection Units ===
The Assyrian Policy Institute advocates in favor of the presence of the Nineveh Plain Protection Units (NPU) in the disputed area of the Nineveh Plain due to its reported positive correlation to the number of Assyrian returnees to towns and villages in the Nineveh Plain where the NPU is in control.

In 2019, API director Reine Hanna testified before the United States Commission on International Religious Freedom claiming that the percentage of Assyrian return in towns guarded by the NPU was higher than those controlled by other forces following the end of the Islamic State's occupation of the Nineveh Plain. The NPU-guarded Assyrian town of Bakhdida, for example, saw a 70% return of the town's original Assyrian population (about 35,000 Assyrians). In Tesqopa, which is controlled by Peshmerga, the alleged rate of return is about 20% of the original Assyrian population (about 2,000 Assyrians). In Tel Keppe, which is controlled by Brigade 50, the alleged return rate of the original Assyrian population is about 7% (about 200 Assyrians).

=== Assyrians and the COVID-19 Pandemic ===
During the COVID-19 pandemic, the API signed a joint NGO statement with other NGOs including Nadia's Initiative and Yazda that highlighted the risks posed to vulnerable populations in Iraq, mainly Assyrians in the Nineveh Plains and Yazidis in Sinjar. The statement urged the Iraqi government to take measures to protect these communities, who they claimed were left especially vulnerable as a result of the pandemic.

The July 2020 community meeting organized by the API in regards to Assyrians in Lebanon included statements about the impact of the COVID-19 Pandemic on the Assyrian population in Lebanon, particularly Assyrian refugees' inability to resettle in their home countries due to pandemic-related travel restrictions.

=== Assyrian genocide recognition ===
The API supports the recognition of the Assyrian genocide as well as compensation towards the survivors and their descendants. In August 2019, the API spearheaded an effort among 15 other Assyrian organizations to release a letter thanking Representative Josh Harder for the creation of House Resolution 537, which would have the United States officially recognize the Assyrian genocide if passed.

In August 2020, the API released a joint statement cosigned by 35 total non-governmental organizations regarding the Simele massacre. In the statement, the organizations encouraged the Iraqi government to officially recognize the massacre, and urged them to maintain the currently unprotected mass grave sites resulting from the massacre, among other requests. Other notable signatories included the Armenian Assembly of America, the Assyrian Aid Society-Iraq, the Hammurabi Human Rights Organization, International Christian Concern, the Iraqi Christian Relief Council, the Montreal Institute for Genocide and Human Rights Studies, and Yazda.

As of 2020, the API has been keeping track of United States recognition of the Assyrian genocide at the state level through a map that documents which state legislatures have recognized the genocide. Currently, API's map says that three American state legislatures (Arizona, California, and New York) have passed resolutions that officially recognize the Assyrian genocide. Ten other legislatures (Alabama, Colorado, Delaware, Georgia, Indiana, Michigan, South Dakota, Tennessee, Washington D.C., and West Virginia) have passed resolutions that recognize the Armenian genocide, but acknowledge the Assyrian victims within their text.

Hanna has also advocated in favor of recognizing the Armenian genocide as well.

=== Partnerships ===
The API has multiple partnerships with other advocacy-based organizations, particularly Assyrian and Yazidi-based ones. Hanna stated in an interview with ANB TV that some of the API's collaborative partners include, but are not limited to, the Assyrian Studies Association, the Assyrian-American Association of Southern California, the Centre for Canadian-Assyrian Relations, and several Assyrian Student Associations. Hanna also stated that there are more, but those are the ones that the API works most closely with.

The official website of the Yazidi advocacy organization Nobody's Listening also lists the API as an official partner of theirs.

=== Reports ===
The Assyrian Policy institute releases reports concerning issues of interest to the Assyrian people. One of the reports concerning minority quotas in Baghdad and Erbil was presented in Gütersloh, Germany.

Currently, its reports are as follows:

Report	Date released
Iraq's Stolen Election: How Assyrian Representation Became Assyrian Repression	November 27, 2018
Lives on Hold: Assyrian Refugees in Jordan	June 20, 2019
An Iraq for All: Improving the Status of Assyrians in the Iraqi Constitution	January 2, 2020
Erasing the Legacy of Khabour: Destruction of Assyrian Cultural Heritage in the Khabour Region of Syria	March 31, 2020
Contested Control: The Future of Security in Iraq's Nineveh Plain	June 1, 2020

== See also ==
- Assyrian Confederation of Europe
- Nineveh Plain Protection Units
- Assyrian Democratic Movement
- Iraqi Christian Relief Council
- Proposals for Assyrian autonomy in Iraq
