= Rafidain List =

Al Rafidain National List
- Founded: ~2005
- Ideology: Assyrian interests Factions: Federalism; Conservatism
- National affiliation: Zowaa; Atranaya

The Rafidain List or Al Rafidain National List (or Mesopotamia List) is the name of the list that is used by Assyrian Democratic Movement during the Iraqi elections, headed by Yunadam Kanna.

At the 2005 parliamentary elections, the NRL got with 36,255 votes (0.4%) and one seat. The National Rafidain List was ahead in Australia and came in a close second in the US.

For the 2018 Iraqi parliamentary election, ADM decided to also include the Assyrian Patriotic Party in the list as well, and won one seat.
