= Chaldean Syriac Assyrian Popular Council =

Chaldean Syriac Assyrian Popular Council ܡܘܬܒܐ ܥܡܡܝܐ ܟܠܕܝܐ ܣܘܪܝܝܐ ܐܬܘܪܝܐ المجلس الشعبي الكلداني السرياني الآشوري
- Leader: Jameel Zaito
- Founder: Sarkis Aghajan
- Founded: March 12, 2007
- Headquarters: Ankawa, Kurdistan Region, Iraq
- Student wing: CSA Student and Youth Center
- Military wing: Nineveh Plain Guard Forces (NPGF)
- Ideology: Assyrian nationalism Autonomism; Regionalism; Self-determination
- Political position: Centre-right
- National affiliation: Athra Alliance
- Seats in the Council of Representatives of Iraq: 0 / 329
- Seats in the Kurdistan Parliament: 1 / 100
- Seats in the local governorate councils: 2 / 440

The Chaldean Syriac Assyrian Popular Council (CSAPC, Syriac: ܡܘܬܒܐ ܥܡܡܝܐ ܟܠܕܝܐ ܣܘܪܝܝܐ ܐܬܘܪܝܐ Motḇā ʿammāyā kaldāyā suryāyā āṯurāyā, Arabic: المجلس الشعبي الكلداني السرياني الآشوري al-Majlis al-Shaʿbi al-Kaldāni al-Suriyāni al-Āshuri), popularly known as Motwa, is a political party in Iraq that aims to represent the Assyrian people. The party in its current state was founded in 2007, on the initiative of Sarkis Aghajan, an ethnic Assyrian who was a high-ranking member of the Kurdistan Democratic Party. As a party that represents minority communities, CSAPC participated in several elections, both on national, regional and local levels, mainly in various coalitions with other minority parties. The current president of the party is Jameel Zaito.

Attempting to overcome internal divisions among those communities, the party was founded under a complex name, that refers to Chaldeans (adherents of the Chaldean Catholic Church), Syriacs (adherents of the Syriac Orthodox and Syriac Catholic Church) and Assyrians (adherents of the Assyrian Church of the East and Ancient Church of the East). One of the main goals of CSAPC is to achieve administrative self-government or outright autonomy for the Nineveh Plains, a northern Iraqi region with high concentration of Christian population. The party claims the majority of the population in the Nineveh Plains suffers neglect and lack of service because they belong to minority groups, whose rights are not fully observed.

The Party runs Ishtar TV and publishes several different monthly magazines.

The party is closely affiliated with the Kurdistan Democratic Party, and is mostly funded by Nechirvan Barzani.

On July 22, 2023 the party joined the Athra Alliance, a political alliance representing Assyrian–Chaldean–Syriac interests in Iraq.

== Results ==
In the January Iraqi governorate elections of 2009, the party was part of a coalition that won the Assyrian reserved seats in Baghdad and Ninawa. It officially backed the Chaldean Democratic Union for the Basra seat, which the CDU won.

On July 25, 2009, the party ran for the first time on its own for the 111-member Kurdistan National Assembly (see 2009 Iraqi Kurdistan legislative election). It received over 10,000 votes and won 3 of the 5 reserved Christian seats.

On March 7, 2010, Iraq held its parliamentary elections, where the party won 2 of the 5 reserved seats. The coalition maintained their seats during the 2014 parliamentary elections.

However, in recent years, the council has lost all elections that it has participated, due to the rise of pro-Iranian affiliated Babylon Movement, and the decline of Nechrivan Barzani's power within the KDP, leading to the rise of Ano Abdoka's Hammurabi Coalition.

== Military wing ==
The Nineveh Plain Guard Forces (NPGF) is composed of former members of the Church Guards that was forced to disband and disarm in 2014 as Kurdish officials began confiscating weapons that belonged to local Assyrians prior to the ISIS invasion that left the Assyrians defenceless.

It's estimated that they currently have 1,500 Assyrian soldiers under Peshmerga command

== See also ==
- Qaraqosh Protection Committee
- Politics of Iraq
- Ethnic groups in Iraq
- Christianity in Iraq
- Assyrian politics in Iraq

== Sources ==
- BarAbraham, Abdulmesih (2018). "Safeguarding the Cross: Emergence of Christian Militias in Iraq and Syria". Middle Eastern Christians and Europe: Historical Legacies and Present Challenges. Wien: LIT Verlag. pp. 217–238. ISBN 978-3-643-91023-3.
- Dougherty, Beth K. (2019) [2004]. Historical Dictionary of Iraq (3rd ed.). Lanham: Rowman & Littlefield. ISBN 978-1-5381-2005-7.
- Lalik, Krzysztof (2018). "Ethnic and Religious Factors of Chaldo-Assyrian Identity in an Interface with the Kurds in Iraqi Kurdistan". Rediscovering Kurdistan's Cultures and Identities: The Call of the Cricket. Cham: Springer. pp. 213–257. ISBN 978-3-319-93088-6.
- Salloum, Saad (2019). "Minorities in Iraq: National Legal Framework, Political Participation, and the Future of Citizenship Given the Current Changes". Beyond ISIS: History and Future of Religious Minorities in Iraq. London: Transnational Press. pp. 11–32. ISBN 978-1-912997-15-2.
- Teule, Herman G. B. (2009). "The Christian Minorities in Iraq: The Question of Religious and Ethnic Identity". In-Between Spaces: Christian and Muslim Minorities in Transition in Europe and the Middle East. Brussel: Peter Lang. pp. 45–57. ISBN 978-90-5201-565-1.
- Teule, Herman G. B. (2012). "Christians in Iraq: An Analysis of Some Recent Political Developments" (PDF). Der Islam. 88 (1): 179–198. doi:10.1515/islam-2011-0010.
- Teule, Herman G. B. (2018). "Christians in Iraq: The Transition from Religious to Secular Identity". International Journal of Asian Christianity. 1: 11–24. doi:10.1163/25424246-00101002.
- Youkhana, Emanuel (2019). "Fleeing ISIS: Aramaic-speaking Christians in the Niniveh Plains after ISIS". Beyond ISIS: History and Future of Religious Minorities in Iraq. London: Transnational Press. pp. 125–150. ISBN 978-1-912997-15-2.
