= Results of the 2018 Iraqi parliamentary election (Assyrian seats) =

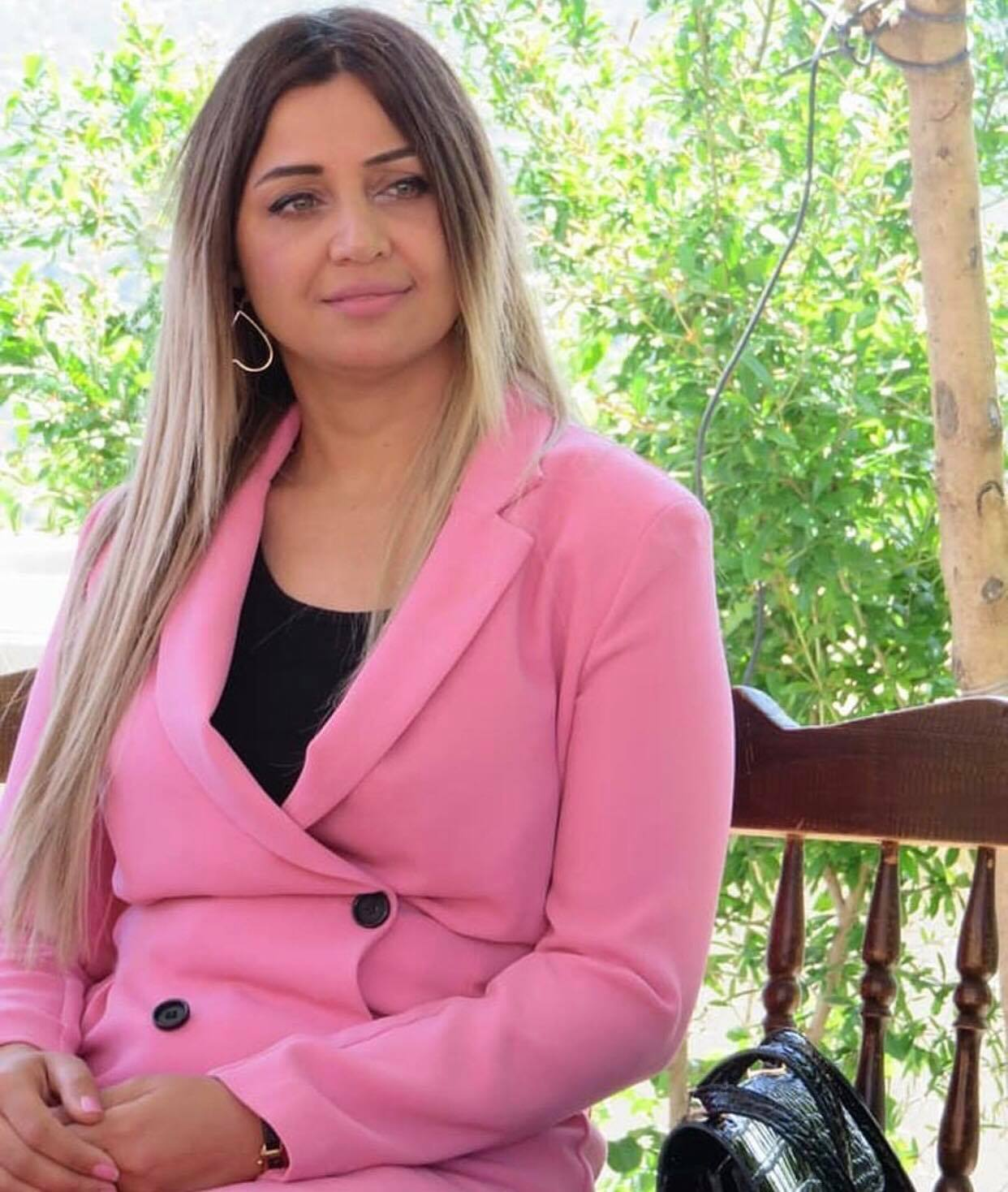
Rehan Hanna, a winner in the elections

The 2018 Assyrian elections in Iraq were the first elections since the Islamic State invasion of Iraq, including the Assyrian heartland, the Nineveh Plains in August 2014. A parliamentary election will be held in Iraq on 12 May 2018. Of the 329 seats in the Iraqi parliament, 5 are reserved for the Christian minorities. The five reserved seats are separated one for each governorate of: Baghdad, Duhok, Erbil, Kirkuk and Nineveh. At the time of voting, only about 200,000 Assyrians remained in the country.

Going into the elections, Assyrian Democratic Movement has two seats, Chaldean Syriac Assyrian Popular Council has two seats, and one by the Iraqi Communist Party. A total of seven lists comprising 67 candidates will compete for the reserved seats. At the time of elections, the Assyrian community was "divided and messy". For the first time in Iraqi history, a Church has officially backed a list, as Chaldean Catholic Patriarch Louis Sako openly urged his followers to vote for the 139 list.

In mid-May 2018, the Iraqi Higher Elector Commission released the results showing a surprise win for the Babylon Movement, a newly formed party by the Shia Islamist militant group Hashd al-Shaabi. The results were seen as unexpected by the Assyrian community, as many complained of outright fraud, where most of votes of Babylon Movement came from Shia Arabs tied to Badr Organization.

== Lists ==
- 113 - Chaldean Syriac Assyrian Popular Council
- 115 - United Bet Nahrain List (Beth Nahren Patriotic Union (BNPU), Iraqi Communist Party (ICP), Kaldo-Ashur Communist Party (KACP), Bet Nahrain Democratic Party (BNDP)
- 131 - Syriac Assembly Movement
- 139 - Chaldean Alliance List (Chaldean National Congress, Chaldean Democratic Union Party and independents)
- 144 - Rafidain List (Assyrian Democratic Movement (ADM) Assyrian Patriotic Party (APP) and independents)
- 154 - Sons of Mesopotamia and independents
- 166 - Babylon Movement (founded by Hashd al-Shaabi leader Rayan al-Kildani)

== Results ==
Party	Votes	%	Seats	+/–
Babylon Movement	33,172	27.51	2	▲2
Chaldean Syriac Assyrian Popular Council	20,197	16.75	1	▼1
Rafidain List (Zowaa–Atranaya)	19,422	16.11	1	▼1
Chaldean List (CL–CNP–CDUP)	16,101	13.35	1	▲1
Beth Nahren Union (BNDP–Chaldo-Ashor)	10,689	8.87	0	▼1
Sons of Mesopotamia	10,666	8.85	0	–
Firas Gorgis Aziz	6,014	4.99	0	–
Syriac Assembly Movement	4,312	3.58	0	–
Total	120,573	100.00	5	–
Source: IHEC Archived 2018-07-10 at the Wayback Machine, API^{:21–25}

Winner
Disqualified
Winner but eventually gave up seat to pursuit ministry position

Candidate	Governorate	List/Party	Votes	Notes
Aswan Salem Sadeq	Nineveh	Babylon Movement	19,955	Brother of Rayan Kildani
Yonadam Kanna	Baghdad	Al-Rafidain/ADM	6,079	Iraq parliament member since 2005, Secretary-General of ADM since 1982
Rehan Hanna Ayoub	Kirkuk	Popular Council	5,458	Lawyer in Zakho
Khoshiar Qardakh Yalda	Erbil	Chaldean Coalition	5,152	Principal of Ankawa female Secondary School. Member of Chaldean League.
Raed Ishaq Matti	Nineveh	Popular Council	3,617	Iraq parliament member since 2014
Anne Nafi Aussi	Nineveh	Al-Rafidain/Independent	3,409	Iraq Minister of Construction and Housing
Faraj Issa Yaqub	Nineveh	Popular Council	3,172	
Imad Youkhana Yaqo	Kirkuk	Al-Rafidain/ADM	2,675	Iraqi parliament member since 2010, Deputy Secretary-General of ADM
Najib Sliwa Hido	Nineveh	Chaldean Coalition	2,637	
Oshana Haziran Hakkari	Duhok	Beth Nahren Union/BNDP	2,401	Brother of Romeo Hakkari
Hazem Yousif Gorgis	Erbil	Beth Nahren Union/KACP	2,208	Lawyer from Ankawa
Ghazwan Rizallah Elias	Duhok	Popular Council	2,196	
Burhan Aldin Ishaq	Baghdad	Babylon Movement	941	
Emanuel Khoshaba Youkhana	Duhok	Al-Rafidain/APP	917	APP president since 2011
Hikmat Daoud Jaboo	Baghdad	Chaldean Coalition	893	Lecturer in Tunis University for 16 years. He unsuccessfully ran for the reserved Kirkuk seat in the 2014 Iraqi parliamentary election
Baida Khidhir Behnam	Duhok	Babylon Movement	833	
Joseph Sylawa Sebi	Erbil	Beth Nahren Union/ICP	809	Iraq parliament member since 2014. From Shaqlawa
Evan Faiq Yaqub	Duhok	Chaldean Coalition	782	
Sabah Mikhael Barkho	Nineveh	Beth Nahren Union/BNPU	782	President of BNPU. Resides in Australia
Faiz Abdul Mikhael	Duhok	Babylon Movement	765	
Kawher Yohanna Awodish	Erbil	Popular Council	737	
Souad Marqos Marqos	Duhok	Chaldean Coalition	720	
Duraid Jameel Isho	Erbil	Babylon Movement	662	
Duraid Hikmat Tobia	Nineveh	Al-Rafidain/ADM	662	
Karolin Makradej Hakoob	Kirkuk	Babylon Movement	640	
Badri Mikhael Warda	Baghdad	Popular Council	626	
Raed Naser Shaya	Erbil	Babylon Movement	602	
Raghad Yousif Jibbo	Baghdad	Babylon Movement	589	
Karolin Adwar Mikho	Kikurk	Popular Council	473	
Basem Habeeb Estivo	Kikurk	Al-Rafidain/Independent	437	Head of Department of Education in Al-Hamdaniya District (2013 - 2017).
Adi Assam Wadie	Baghdad	Chaldean Coalition	415	
Maysoon Jajjo Matti	Duhok	Popular Council	387	
Faris Sami Yousif	Baghdad	Beth Nahren Union/ICP	375	Physical education professor at Baghdad University
Aziz Emmanuel Gorgis	Duhok	Beth Nahren Union/BNPU	360	A CSAPC member since 2006, Aziz left the party in January 2018 after not being elected to run for the elections
Nahla Mansoor Issa	Erbil	Popular Council	359	
Ashur Yalda Benyamin	Kirkuk	Babylon Movement	354	
Ibrahim Hanoosh Alias	Kirkuk	Beth Nahren Union/Ind.	348	Retired Iraqi Army general from Bartella
Kafi Dano Bani	Nineveh	Chaldean Coalition	337	
Raed Jamal Nashat	Kirkuk	Chaldean Coalition	335	
Hogir Andraws Yalda	Erbil	Chaldean Coalition	333	Elementary math teacher in Erbil, originally from Koya. Member of Chaldean League
Fathel Toma Matti	Nineveh	Babylon Movement	333	
Muna Sarhan Sindo	Baghdad	Al-Rafidain/Independent	316	Chemistry professor at University of Baghdad
Khalida Sleman Alias	Nineveh	Beth Nahren Union/ICP	288	Retired Civil Servant from Karemlash
Shamoon Shlemoon Isho	Duhok	Al-Rafidain/ADM	251	Member of ADM's council.
Blsam Josef Patro	Kirkuk	Chaldean Coalition	227	
Nithal Toma Oraha	Kirkuk	Beth Nahren Union/ICP	184	Resides in Baghdad, originally from Alqosh
Dania Rufael Odisho	Baghdad	Popular Council	173	
Sami Abdalahad Yousif	Baghdad	Beth Nahren Union/BNPU	161	Engineer from Bartella
Hani Ibrahim Gorial	Erbil	Al-Rafidain/APP	137	Has worked within Baghdad's Ministry of Oil since 2006
Firjin Hanna Kroomi	Erbil	Al-Rafidain/Independent	124	Head of offices within Al-Hamdaniya District department of health (1988–2006)

=== Results by settlement ===
==== Baqofah ====
Party	Total votes	Percentage
Kurdistan Democratic Party*	38	48.1%
Sons of Mesopotamia	21	26.6%
Babylon Movement	8	10.1%
Chaldean Syriac Assyrian Popular Council	4	5.1%
Dr. Firas Aziz Korakis	4	5.1%
Chaldean Alliance	2	2.5%
Rafidain List	2	2.5%

==== Tesqopa ====
Party	Total votes	Percentage
Chaldean Syriac Assyrian Popular Council	279	33.7%
Kurdistan Democratic Party*	194	23.4%
Sons of Mesopotamia	143	17.3%
Chaldean Coalition	138	16.7%
Rafidain List	56	6.8%
Babylon Movement	18	2.2%
