= Bet-Nahrain Democratic Party =

Assyrian political party based in Iraq

Bet-Nahrain Democratic Party ܓܒܐ ܕܝܡܘܩܪܛܝܐ ܕܒܝܬ-ܢܗܪܝܢ
- Leader: Romeo Hakkari
- Founder: Sargon Dadesho
- Founded: 1 November 1976; 49 years ago
- Headquarters: Ankawa, Iraq
- Military wing: Nineveh Plain Forces
- Ideology: Assyrian nationalism Self-determination
- Colours: Blue
- Seats in the Council of Representatives of Iraq: 0 / 325
- Seats in the Kurdistan Region Parliament: 0 / 105

Website
- www.bet-nahrain.org

The Bet-Nahrain Democratic Party (BNDP) (Syriac: ܓܒܐ ܕܝܡܘܩܪܛܝܐ ܕܒܝܬ-ܢܗܪܝܢ, romanized: Gaba Demoqrataya d-Bet-Nahrain) is an Assyrian political party based in Iraq. Founded in the 1970s, its platform emphasizes Assyrian nationalism and advocated for an Assyrian autonomous region in Iraq, which caused them to be put under surveillance from the Ba'ath Party. It has participated in Assyrian politics in Iraq since the 2003 invasion, with varying success in elections, and had continued to advocate for an autonomous Assyrian state in Iraq.

Since 2003, the secretary general of the party has been Romeo Hakkari. Aside from its own personal political activities, the party also established the Nineveh Plain Forces in the wake of ISIS, and joined the Athra Alliance alongside several other Assyrian political parties in 2023. The BNDP has been known to opt its stance towards the Kurdish Regional Government, often in opposition to parties like the Assyrian Democratic Movement who prioritized the Federal government of Iraq. The party is also noted for its affiliation with the ruling Barzani family of the Kurdistan Regional Government (KRG) and its relation with the Kurdistan Democratic Party, under the leadership of Hakkari.

== History ==
The Bet Nahrain Democratic Party traces its origin back to the formation of the Bet-Nahrain Assyrian National Movement in 1970. During the early 1970s, the party's eventual founder, Sargon Dadesho, was described by Zinda Magazine as a "vocal evangelist for the Assyrian Universal Alliance" (AUA). However, his pursuit of more militant political strategies led him to leave the AUA and form the BNDP, with the help of former AUA members. Dadesho had previously immigrated to California in 1965, where after wanting to learn more about why his family left Iraq, he began to read more seriously into Assyrian history and learning about the struggles they had faced. The party itself was founded on 1 November, 1976 based on the concept of the Bet-Nahrain Assyrian National Movement.

Dadesho advocated Assyrian nationalism through the BNDP, creating the Assyrian National Manifesto in 1982 which called for an Assyrian autonomous state in Mosul or Duhok. The manifesto prompted heavy concerns from the still newly emerged Ba'athist regime of Iraq, especially in relation to the party's activities with leaders of the Chaldean Catholic Church. The BNDP was eventually put under the surveillance of the Iraqi government, alongside other Assyrian political parties, with notes of the party's position on an independent Assyrian state in the Nineveh Province and the formation of the "Assyrian National Front" with the AUA.

According to the AUA, the BNDP was one of the first organizations to adopt the modern Assyrian flag. In 2000, the Ba'athist government arrested Assyrians from Mosul and Baghdad after they were found to have obtained pamphlets from the party.

== Organization ==
As of 2025, the secretary general of the BNDP is Romeo Hakkari. Prior to his Hakkari has been the main figure leading the BNDP since 2003, and the party is connected to the Bet-Nahrain, Inc. organization headed by Sargon Dadesho in Modesto, California.

The headquarters of the BNDP are based in Ankawa, Erbil. The party also has branches in Erbil, Nineveh, Kirkuk, and Duhok governorates, as well as in Europe and the United States.

== Electoral history ==
From January 2005, Iraq began hosting open elections, which allowed the BNDP to participate in political candidate lists for the first time. The party contested the 2005 Kurdistan Region parliamentary election as part of the ruling Democratic Patriotic Alliance of Kurdistan and were allocated one seat for Romeo Hakkari. It also contested the January 2005 Iraqi legislative election as part of the Kurdish alliance, and Goriel Mineso Khamis was allocated one seat in the Council of Representatives of Iraq. Although initially participating in its own list, which comprised a number of cultural organizations and smaller political parties, it did not participate in the Iraqi legislative election of December 2005, as Romeo Hakkari had withdrawn before the elections began.

In the Iraqi governorate elections of 2009, the BNDP allied itself with the Chaldean Syriac Assyrian Popular Council in the Ishtar Patriotic List. The list won two seats in Baghdad and Ninawa, with BNDP member Giwargis Esho Sada winning the seat in Baghdad. Prior to the 2009 Kurdistan Region parliamentary election, the party withdrew from the elections.

In the 2010 Iraqi parliamentary election, the BNDP ran as part of a united list with the Assyrian Patriotic Party and the Chaldean Democratic Forum, called the Ishtar Democratic List. The list received the fewest votes across all governorates, and the party won no seats or representation. Similarly, in the 2013 Kurdistan Region parliamentary election, a candidate from the party ran as part of a Chaldean Syriac Assyrian United List, but was unsuccessful at obtaining a seat in the parliament, coming in third place on the list overall.

In the 2018 Iraqi parliamentary election, the BNDP ran as part of the United Bet Nahrain List and received the highest votes of any Christian candidate in the Duhok Governorate, but the seat was ultimately awarded to Emanuel Khoshaba Youkhana of the Assyrian Patriotic Party.

In 2023, the BNDP joined the Athra Alliance established by the Assyrian Democratic Movement. Through the coalition, the party participated in the 2023 Iraqi governorate elections, which was part of the motivation for creating the alliance, but won no seats. The party has taken part in signing statements that condemned the discrimination of Assyrians as part of the alliance.

== Activities ==
=== Alliances and conferences ===
In 1983, the party under Sargon Dadesho set up the Assyrian National Congress, alongside the Assyrian American Leadership Council, aiming to advocate for Assyrian rights. In 2001, Radio Free Europe/Radio Liberty reported that the party was in talks with Iraqi Turkmen political groups alongside the Assyrian Democratic Movement. It was listed as having been active in Iraq in 2003 by the National Democratic Institute, and advocated for Assyrian nationalism in Iraq; though in comparison with the ADM, the party opted to ally with Kurdish interests. The coalition was criticized for attempting to undermine the ADM by requesting a meeting with Sarkis Aghajan Mamendo.

The party also hosted its own conferences where they discussed party activities, issues of leadership and politics in the Assyrian homeland, and calls for greater autonomy. In August 2006, the party hosted its Congress in California, reaffirming its stance to establish an autonomous Assyrian state in Iraq. The BNDP would host its eighth conference in 2023.

=== Nineveh Plain Forces ===
In 2014, the BNDP and Bet-Nahrain Patriotic Union announced the formation of the Nineveh Plain Forces to protect the people of the Nineveh Plain and maintain control of the region for people that want to return to the area. The force had been stationed in the Tal Qasab village north of Mosul, and was intended to liberate Assyrian/Christian areas from ISIS while acting as the basis for security for an Assyrian autonomous region.

The force, however, was criticized for acting as a Kurdish proxy against the Nineveh Plain Protection Units, and although it reported 500 soldiers, eyewitness reports said that there were less than 50 active soldiers. The force operated under the command of the Peshmerga and has been described as a Kurdish proxy group, and was dissolved soon after their last update on social media in September 2017.

=== Modern activities ===
In 2016, the Iraqi Parliament voted against a new Christian province in Nineveh Plains, to which Romeo Hakkari told Kurdistan 24, "We do not want to be part of the possible Sunni autonomous region in Iraq." That same year, the BNDP was a signatory alongside other Assyrian political parties on a joint statement calling for the unification of Assyrian militias for the purpose of security in the Nineveh Plains. The following year, in 2017, the party continued its collaboration through "The March Agreement," calling for the creation of a Nineveh Plain province with international monitoring and guarantees for security. In June, the party was one of seven Assyrian political parties that participated in a conference in Brussels titled "A Future for Christians in Iraq," which advocated for the recognition of Assyrian victimization as genocide and for political autonomy. During the 2017 Iraqi–Kurdish conflict, Hakkari and the BNDP signing a collective document of support for the Kurdistan Regional Government (KRG), condemning the federal Iraqi government's military actions.

The party still engages in smaller activities in Iraq as of the 2020s. Hakkari had been chosen as head of the National Union Coalition by the KRG from 2019 to 2023. Parallel to other Assyrian political parties, the BNDP condemned the revocation of minority political seats in the Kurdistan Region Parliament and had taken part in boycotting the 2024 Kurdistan Region parliamentary election. In October 2025, the political bureau of the party issued a statement on the 49th anniversary of the founding of the party.

== Reception ==
Since 2003, a number of Assyrian organizations such as the Chaldean Syriac Assyrian Popular Council (which was composed of several small groups opposed to the ADM) have been established as proxy organizations to undermine organic Assyrian groups and advance outside interests (namely Arab or Kurdish). Visible community figures have also been proxied and tokenized to promote the KDP, presenting the KRG as adopting practices of co-existence while countering claims of abuse and injustice. Christians are often faced with choosing Arab or Kurdish aspirations where there is deep legacy of mistrust and knowledge of being used in a larger political struggle against their interests.

Like other Assyrian political parties in Iraq, the Bet-Nahrain Democratic Party has been criticized for its affiliation with the Kurdistan Democratic Party (KDP). In a 2018 report by the Assyrian Policy Institute, the group noted Romeo Hakkari's role as the Kurdistan Regional Government's Assyrian representative for the 2017 Kurdistan Region independence referendum, and that he advocated for a Nineveh Plain governorate administered by the KRG. The same report details that in the 2018 Iraqi parliamentary election, the KDP endorsed Hakkari's brother, Oshana Nissan, who wasn't well known in the Assyrian community apart from his affiliations with the KDP. The report also stated that many of the votes that came to Oshana were through Kurdish votes from Kirkuk and areas of Erbil with no Assyrian population, as well as voter intimidation against Assyrians in Duhok. The Assyrian Democratic Organization also criticized the party and Hakkari for their affiliation with Kurdish groups during Iraqi elections.

== Bibliography ==
- BarAbraham, Abdulmesih (2018). "Safeguarding the Cross: Emergence of Christian Militias in Iraq and Syria". Middle Eastern Christians and Europe: Historical Legacies and Present Challenges. Wien: LIT Verlag. pp. 217–238. ISBN 9783643910233.
- Benjamen, Alda (19 January 2022). Assyrians in Modern Iraq: Negotiating Political and Cultural Space. University of California, Berkeley: Cambridge University Press. doi:10.1017/9781108976633. ISBN 9781108976633.
- Boháč, Artur (1 April 2010). "Assyrian Ethnic Identity in a Globalizing World" (PDF). Beyond Globalisation: Exploring the Limits of Globalisation in the Regional Context. University of Ostrava: 67–72.
- Donabed, Sargon (2010). Iraq and the Assyrian Unimagining: Illuminating Scaled Suffering and a Hierarchy of Genocide from Simele to Anfal (PhD thesis). University of Toronto.
- Hanna, Reine; Joseph, Max (27 November 2018). Iraq's Stolen Election: How Assyrian Representation Became Assyrian Repression (PDF) (Report). Assyrian Policy Institute.
- Hanna, Reine; Kruczek, Gregory J. (1 June 2020). Contested Control: The Future of Security in Iraq's Nineveh Plain (Report). Assyrian Policy Institute. Archived from the original on 3 August 2025.
- Knuppe, Austin (22 November 2022). "The Civilians' Dilemma: How Religious and Ethnic Minorities Survived the Islamic State Occupation of Northern Iraq". The Journal of the Middle East and Africa. 14 (1): 37–67. doi:10.1080/21520844.2022.2128001.
- Kruczek, Gregory (10 March 2021). "Christian (Second-Order) Minorities and the Struggle for the Homeland: The Assyrian Democratic Movement in Iraq and the Nineveh Plains Protection Units". The Journal of the Middle East and Africa. 12 (1): 93–121. doi:10.1080/21520844.2021.1886521.
- Petrosian, Vahram (2006). "Assyrians in Iraq". Iran and the Caucasus. 10 (1): 113–147. doi:10.1163/157338406777979322. ISSN 1609-8498 – via JSTOR.
- Teule, Herman G. B. (2012). "Christians in Iraq: An Analysis of Some Recent Political Developments" (PDF). Der Islam. 88 (1): 179–198. doi:10.1515/islam-2011-0010.
