= Nineveh Plain Forces =

Assyrian militia in Iraq

- ܚܝ̈ܠܘܬܐ ܕܕܫܬܐ ܕܢܝܢܘܐ قوات سهل نينوى
- Emblem of the NPF
- Leader: Safaa Khamro/Elias Jajo
- Dates active: January 2015 – 2017 (alleged)
- Active regions: Nineveh Plains, Assyrian homeland
- Ideology: Assyrian nationalism Dawronoye
- Size: 200 light infantry
- Part of: Beth Nahrain Patriotic Union; BNDP
- Wars: the Iraqi Civil War (2014–2017) and the Battle of Mosul (2016–17)

The Nineveh Plain Forces (Syriac: ܚܝ̈ܠܘܬܐ ܕܕܫܬܐ ܕܢܝܢܘܐ, romanized: Ḥaylawathe d'Deshta d'Ninwe; Arabic: قوات سهل نينوى; abbreviated as NPF) was an Assyrian militia. Formed in cooperation with the Kurdish Peshmerga, the militia's primary mission was to defend the Nineveh Plains against the Islamic State. The group was affiliated with the Bet-Nahrain Democratic Party and the Beth Nahrain Patriotic Union (HBA), the latter being part of the secular Dawronoye movement. Along with smaller episodes of combat, the group also participated in the Battle of Mosul (2016–2017).

Formed on 6 January 2015, the Nineveh Plain Forces had only a very short time in combat, and was considered defunct by late 2017.

== History ==
The Nineveh Plain Forces (NPF) was founded on the 6th of January 2015 by the Bet Nahrain Democratic Party (BNDP), an Assyrian political party that received support from the Kurdistan Democratic Party. The announcement of the formation of the group was held in the Assyrian village of Tesqopa, and they had become registered within the Ministry of Peshmerga, allowing them to receive salary as soldiers as well as weapons. At the time of the announcement, the group claimed that it had a stronghold of 500 soldiers, but in other instances, the group claimed it had upwards of 600 soldiers.

The NPF's stated goals were similar to those of the Nineveh Plain Protection Units, to provide protection for Assyrians against ISIS and remain as a security force once they had been fought back; the key difference being that the NPF and the BNDP advocated for a Nineveh Plain Governorate administered by the KRG. Despite leaning towards the KRG, though, Romeo Hakkari stated that Assyrians still had a bitter taste left in their mouths by the withdrawal of Peshmerga forces from defending Assyrian areas before ISIS came to the Nineveh Plains.

Although the force would primarily be stationed in Tesqopa, other reports suggest that they also had stations in Tal Qasab north of Mosul.

== Activities ==
In February 2016, the group completed training under the leadership of the Peshmerga and began deployment to areas surrounding Mosul and Tesqopa. At the time, commander Safaa Elias Jajo stated that the NPF consisted of 600 total fighters, 285 of which had been deployed to front lines.

On May 30, 2016, the group announced that it had begun operations to liberate the Nineveh Plains from ISIS alongside Kurdish forces. Earlier that year, it had indicated its readiness to participate in such operations, stating that their forces were currently stationed in a number of Assyrian/Christian areas in the Nineveh Plains and that they had previously repelled many ISIS terror attacks during this time.

=== Battle of Mosul (2016–17) ===
On 17 October 2016, the NPF announced their intentions to participate in the planned offensive in the Nineveh Plains alongside the Iraqi Army, Peshmerga and Iraqi Federal Police.

On October 29, 2016, a joint meeting was held amongst Assyrian political organizations, hosted by Mar Yokhana Putrus Moshe with the presence of a representative of Gewargis III at the headquarters of the Syriac Catholic Diocese. The meeting was attended by the Bet Nahrain Democratic Party, the Bet Nahrain Patriotic Union, the Chaldean National Congress, the Syriac Assembly Movement, the Assyrian Democratic Movement, the Assyrian Patriotic Party, and the Chaldean Syriac Assyrian Popular Council, and it was jointly agreed to emphasize uniting Assyrian militias for the same goal while also keeping the Nineveh Plains out of future conflicts.

NPF liberated the Assyrian village of Batnaya on Tuesday 25 October alongside Dwekh Nawsha and Peshmerga forces. The NPF placed the cross on the Chaldean Catholic Mar Oraha Monastery in Batnaya after ISIS removed all Christian religious symbols from the village.

== Controversy ==
In conjunction with the Bet-Nahrain Democratic Party and other groups, the Nineveh Plain Forces were criticized as being a proxy for the Kurdish Regional Government and the Dawronoye movement. A report by the Assyrian Policy Institute noted that the KRG had used Assyrian proxies as part of political maneuvering in the Nineveh Plains, as well as for public relations to pin itself as a protector of Assyrians in post-invasion Iraq.

The report also noted that while the group stated to have as high as 600 soldiers, some observers alleged that no more than 50 soldiers were active at any one time. By the time the Nineveh Plains was liberated, the NPF had only managed to secure a small, mostly symbolic presence in Batnaya, as well as other areas that were controlled by the Peshmerga, until the October 2017 withdrawal of KRG forces following the Kurdish referendum.

The founding of the Nineveh Plain Forces through the KRG was also indicative of the larger battle between the Federal government of Iraq and the Kurdish government in relation to the Assyrians; as opposed to the NPU and its affiliation with the Assyrian Democratic Movement, who opted for support from federal Iraq, the Nineveh Plain Forces, as well as the Nineveh Plain Guard forces of the Chaldean Syriac Assyrian Popular Council, sided with the KRG.

=== Disbandment ===
In the same report by the API, it is stated that the NPF was disbanded in 2017 following the unsuccessful Kurdistan Region independence referendum. Although the leader of the BNDP, Romeo Hakkari, had been an advocate for Kurdish independence, the NPF was effectively stripped of its security responsibilities by the time the independence referendum failed. Though a report by Aid to the Church in Need suggested that they were still active in parts north of Batnaya by 2020, it is likely that the group had been disbanded beforehand.

Although the force has rarely shown up in name since 2017, they made a post on their Facebook page to celebrate their 10th anniversary on January 8, 2025.

== See also ==
- Dawronoye
- Bet-Nahrain Democratic Party
- Nineveh Plain Protection Units
- Qaraqosh Protection Committee
- Dwekh Nawsha
- List of armed groups in the War in Iraq (2013–2017)
