= Athra Alliance =

Athra Alliance ܒܪܩܝܡܐ ܕܐܬܼܪܐ تحالف اثرا
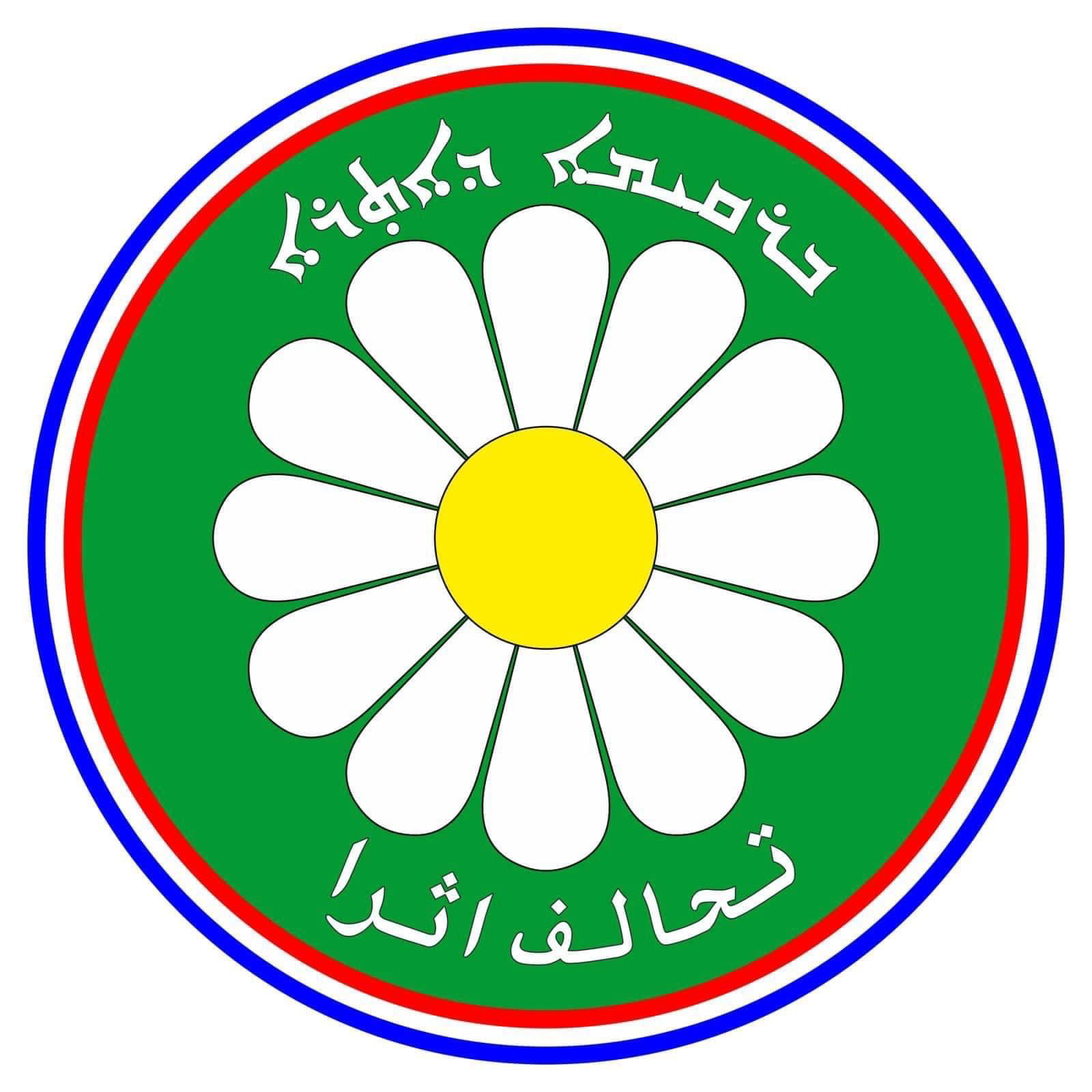
- Leader: Yacoob G. Yaco
- Founded: 22 July 2023; 3 years ago
- Headquarters: Baghdad, Iraq
- Ideology: Assyrian nationalism Minority politics

The Athra Alliance (Syriac: ܒܪܩܝܡܐ ܕܐܬܼܪܐ, Arabic: تحالف اثرا) is a political alliance of five political parties in Iraq that represent the Chaldean-Syriac-Assyrian people. The alliance comprises these five parties:

- Assyrian Democratic Movement
- Assyrian Patriotic Party
- Beth Nahrin Patriotic Union
- Chaldean Syriac Assyrian Popular Council
- Bet-Nahrain Democratic Party

The alliance was initially hailed as a major breakthrough for Chaldean-Syriac-Assyrian people in Iraq, believing that a uniting political force was needed to regain political representation. Patriarch of the Assyrian Church of the East, Awa III, noted the necessity of unity amongst Assyrian political parties, citing the Athra Alliance as a step in the right direction.

== History ==
The five parties that had joined the alliance originally convened to discuss the political situation of Assyrians in Iraq, and the need to prevent demographic changes in the Nineveh Plains. The alliance was formed around the same time that the Chaldean Patriarch Louis Raphaël I Sako moved the Patriarchal headquarters from Baghdad to Erbil, in the Kurdistan Region of Iraq, following political tension between the Patriarch and Iraqi government. Abdul Latif Rashid, then the Iraqi president, removed its official recognition of Louis Raphaël I Sako as the authority of the Chaldean Church, sparking protests amongst the Assyrian community in Ankawa. Additionally, the Babylon Brigade under the leadership of Rayan al-Kildani had stolen the political seats designated for Assyrians and Christians in Iraq in the 2021 Iraqi parliamentary election.

In its message of founding the alliance, the Assyrian Democratic Movement stressed the importance of gaining political representation in the 2023 Iraqi governorate elections, as well combatting discrimination and allocating resources to rebuild the Nineveh Plains post-ISIS. The party was registered under the Independent High Electoral Commission in Baghdad on July 22, 2023.

== Activity ==
The Athra Alliance was active in investigating the Bakhdida wedding fire, which occurred on September 26th, 2023. A public protest was organized demanding accountability and compensation, concerned with the Iraqi government's lack of credibility regarding investigations. In the aftermath of the fire, the alliance also wrote a letter rejected the concluded investigation and calling for a renewed one, as well as compensation for those who were killed.

The Athra Alliance's chosen candidates for the 2023 Iraqi governorate elections were Walentina William Youssef (Kirkuk), Sharara Yusuf Ishaq (Baghdad), and Ma'rib Imad Elias Hanno (Nineveh). During the election, campaigning for Hanno was done with the collaboration of the Beth Nahrain Patriotic Union, visiting areas in the Nineveh Plains and encouraging voter participation. Following the elections, the party criticized the lack of Assyrian voter turnout, with additional criticism levied towards electoral laws regarding minorities in Iraq.

Following changes to the Kurdish region's minority seats in 2024, the Athra Alliance demanded the return of allocated minority seats in the parliament and boycotted the 2024 Kurdistan Region parliamentary election.

In 2025, the Athra Alliance participated in a coalition of Assyrian organizations that met in Washington, D.C. to advocate for Assyrian rights at the International Religious Freedom Summit.

Later in April, the alliance called for the recognition of Kha b'Nissan (Assyrian New Year) by the Iraqi parliament, stating that the celebration reaffirmed the Assyrian's enduring national identity.
