= Dwekh Nawsha =

Iraqi Assyrian militia

- ܕܒ݂ܝܚ ܢܦ̮ܫܐ
- Dwekh Nawsha emblem
- Leaders: Emanuel Khoshaba Youkhana, Majid Elya
- Dates active: 2014 – 2018
- Allegiance: Assyrian Patriotic Party
- Active regions: Nineveh Plains, Assyrian homeland
- Size: 15-50 (reported 250 light infantry)
- Wars: the Iraqi insurgency (2011–present)
- Website: Archived 2017-10-17 at the Wayback Machine

Dwekh Nawsha (Syriac: ܕܒ݂ܝܚ ܢܦ̮ܫܐ; literally "self-sacrificing") was an Assyrian military organization created in June 2014. The group was created in response to the Fall of Mosul and the takeover of the ISIS in order to defend Iraq's Assyrian (and Christian) population. The militia worked primarily to defend Assyrian villages in the Nineveh Governorate.

The Dwekh Nawsha operated in coordination with regional and international security forces (namely the Peshmerga), and was under the command of the Assyrian Patriotic Party. Observers noted that many of the militiamen who were part of the organization were not members of the party, nor were they ethnic Assyrians. Several Christian foreign fighters joined the group and worked to defend Assyrian communities; they include Americans, French, British and Australians.

The militia is not known to have had significant roles in combat during the War in Iraq, acting as more of a reserve for when necessary, and retrospectives of the militia often cite its placement in the larger conflict between the Kurdish Regional Government and the Federal government of Iraq over disputed territories. The group was eventually disbanded.

== History ==
Dwekh Nawsha was founded in 2014, following the Fall of Mosul and the War in Iraq against ISIS. The militia was set up with the help of the Peshmerga following the recapture of Baqofah, where security was transferred to the group afterwards. Unlike other Assyrian militias, the Dwekh Nawsha was never officially incorporated into the units of the Peshmerga, and primarily received support with funding from the Assyrian diaspora.

Observers noted that the militia received volunteers and militiamen through the enlisting of foreign fighters from Western countries, in the absence of assistance from the Peshmerga and the Federal government of Iraq. In 2015, two reports of volunteers from outside of Iraq enlisting in the militia surfaced, with a man named Khamis Gewargis Khamis from Melbourne, Australia and a United States Army veteran from Detroit named Brett Royales joining the group. Time Magazine also reported of a US veteran joining the group, and a British volunteer was even said to have sold their house before joining. The group was reportedly opening slots for volunteers from France, and opening other branches to recruit people to fight against ISIS.

Sons of Liberty International, who had previously trained the Nineveh Plain Protection Units, announced in the fall of 2015 that they would begin training Dwekh Nawsha in their fight against ISIL. The group is said to have provided support during the November 2015 Sinjar offensive.

== Controversy ==
Much like other Assyrian militias that were formed after ISIS, Dwekh Nawsha was criticized for its alignment with the Kurdish Regional Government and for essentially acting as a Kurdish proxy. A report that was released by the Assyrian Policy Institute in June 2020 stated that the founding of Dwekh Nawsha, as well as the Nineveh Plain Forces and the Nineveh Plain Guard Forces (NPGF) of the Chaldean Syriac Assyrian Popular Council was merely to serve as partly a public relations ploy, as well as a political maneuver to instill Kurdish influence in the Nineveh Plains.

The API also criticized the significant gap in combat operations that the militia participated in compared to the public media discussion of the group. In August 2016, the president of the APP, Emanuel Khoshaba Youkhana, appeared on The Rubin Report and was introduced as the "Commander in Chief of the Assyrian Army", which was described as creating the illusion of Assyrian support for the militia. The group is also stated to have not taken part in the Battle of Mosul, instead offering assistance or acting as a police unit for Assyrian villages in the Nineveh Plains.

Other criticisms were levied towards the militia, following on the premise of being a symbolic gesture with no actual participation in combat. In the Time Magazine article, a foreign soldier described how most of the time spent with the militia was spent sitting at their headquarters in Nohadra, with soldiers not being allowed to hold weapons on the front lines. A report by CNN from April 2015 indicated that while many were interested in joining the militia, only 40 active militiamen were registered, and this small size had left them to cooperate directly with the Peshmerga. Samir Oraha, a member of the militia, stated in an interview that any actions of the militia would need explicit approval from the Peshmerga, and before the Battle of Mosul, fighters were told to stand down. Later interviews with former members of the militia as part of a 2021 article revealed that the actual number of soldiers was significantly lower than reported, totaling anywhere from 15 to 50 with 10–15 on the frontline at any given point, and most of the members had little to no coordination or combat experience. Foreign volunteers typically shifted in and out of the militia, with many disappointed at the lack of combat experience, and that confidence quickly dropped in DN as time went on.

While it's believed that Dwekh Nawsha still had some stronghold around Tel Keppe and Tesqopa in 2018, the same API report claimed that they were eventually disbanded and that all of their social media accounts had been deleted.

== Legacy ==
Since their disbandment, Dwekh Nawsha has been retrospectively studied as part of how minority populations respond to conflicts that threaten their communities, while noting that the militia effectively stood at a crossroads as part of the micro-minority status of Assyrians in Iraq. Comparisons have been made between it and other groups, namely the Nineveh Plain Protection Units, to show how confidence of the Peshmerga shifted as the security situation became much worse. However, the group has also been studied to show how the Assyrians heightened their morale during the difficult time, with the very presence of the militia providing security as well as religious symbolism helping to boost support and bring attention of ISIS crimes to the world.

== See also ==
- Assyrian Patriotic Party
- Nineveh Plain Protection Units
- Nineveh Plain Forces
- Qaraqosh Protection Committee
- List of armed groups in the War in Iraq (2013–2017)
