= Rayan al-Kildani =

Iraqi-Assyrian politician

Rayan al-Kildani ريان الكلداني
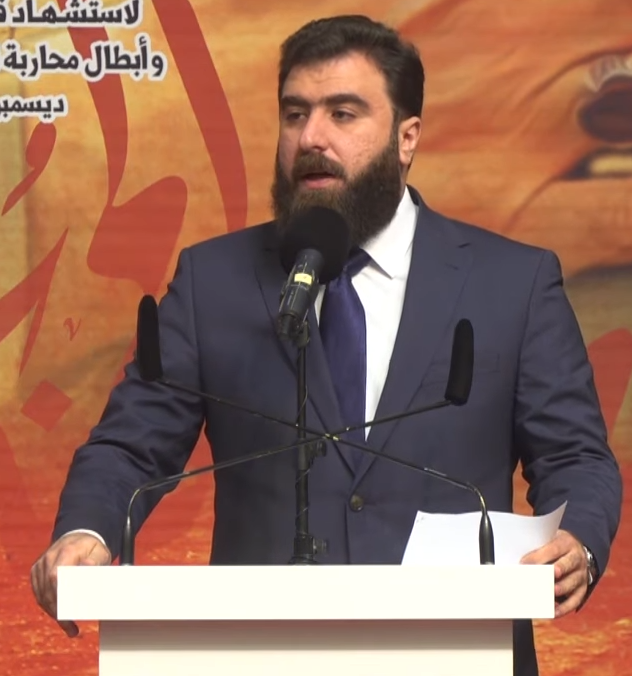
- Rayan delivering a speech, 2022

Personal details
- Born: 3 September 1989 (age 36) Alqosh, Nineveh, Ba'athist Iraq
- Party: Babylon Movement

Rayan Salem Sadiq al-Kildani (Arabic: ريان سالم صادق الكلداني), is an Iraqi Assyrian politician who serves as the general secretary of the Babylon Movement, as well as its military component, the Babylon Brigade. He rose to power after founding the party in 2014, which had initially been involved in defending the Nineveh Plains from ISIS when they were at their most active.

On 18 July 2019, the United States Department of the Treasury sanctioned al-Kildani under Executive Order 13818 for serious human rights abuse. The Treasury Department stated that he led the 50th Brigade of the Popular Mobilization Forces and that a video had circulated in which he cut off the ear of a handcuffed detainee. It also stated that the 50th Brigade had impeded the return of internally displaced persons to the Nineveh Plain, systematically looted homes in Batnaya, illegally seized and sold agricultural land, and was accused by local residents of intimidation, extortion, and harassment of women.

== Biography ==
Al-Kildani was born to a family of Chaldean Catholics in 1989 in the town of Alqosh, in the Nineveh Governorate. At some point, he moved to Baghdad and remained settled in Sadr City, where he eventually assimilated into the majority Shia Muslim community. During the US invasion of Iraq, he left school and took up arms with the Mahdi Army, who was known for their attacks on US troops.

Al-Kildani began his political career in June 2014, when he founded the Babylon Brigades to defend the Nineveh Plains against ISIS. At the time, his movement had been the only Christian militia in the whole of the Popular Mobilization Forces, which is predominantly Shiite Muslim. Al-Kildani presented his movement as fighting for the existence of his once-important community, citing religious harmony between Christians and Muslims in the country. At the time of its founding, the militia had a strong-hold of about 1000 fighters.

In 2017, al-Kildani was involved in a struggle with Salwan Momika, an Iraqi Assyrian from Qaraqosh who had founded a militia called the "Syriac Democratic Forces". Al-Kildani eventually won this struggle, causing Momika to flee Iraq altogether for Sweden.

In 2019, the United States formally sanctioned al-Kildani, as well as leader of the Shabak Militia Waad Qado, citing human rights violations and his connection to the Popular Mobilization Forces. Additional reasons for the sanction included systematic looting of villages and selling of agricultural land, blackmailing and harassing women, and preventing internally displaced persons from returning to their homes in the Nineveh Plains. In response to the sanctions, the Iraqi Central Bank froze his assets after an official bank order.

=== Modern political activities ===
In the 2021 Iraqi parliamentary election, al-Kildani and the Babylon Movement obtained 4 of the 5 seats reserved for Iraqi Christians out of the 329 seats in the Iraqi Parliament. However, the validity of the elections of these seats have been called into question, with former Assyrian MP Joseph Sliwa claiming that 90% of the votes for the organization weren't from Christians. Following elections in 2023 yielded similar results for al-Kildani, which have led to speculations of vote-buying and bypassing election loopholes to subdue proper Assyrian and Christian representation. That same year, in 2021, he was invited to meet with Lebanese president Michel Aoun, emphasizing the role of Christians across West Asia and ensuring demographic returns to Iraq.

In 2022, al-Kildani met with Hoshyar Zebari of the Kurdistan Democratic Party to discuss the situation of Iraqi Christians and to have a mutual dialogue between political parties. That same year, he met with Prime Minister of the autonomous Iraqi Kurdistan, Masrour Barzani, on the future of Iraq. He was also received by Massoud Barzani during the same meeting.

In 2023, Rayan met with United Nations Secretary General António Guterres during his visit to Iraq. Guterres was subsequently faced with criticism after a photo of the pair, as well as Qais Khazali, surfaced online.

Al-Kildani is allied with Abu Mahdi al-Muhandis, the leader of Kataeb Hezbollah and an affiliate of the Popular Mobilization Forces, and has previously been seen pictured with him. He continues to lead the Babylon Brigade alongside his brother, Osama; despite Iraqi government orders to evacuate the Nineveh Plains, al-Kildani has so far refused to do so. It is speculated that Rayan continues to lead the Brigade for his own personal interests, given the land seizures and looting in the Nineveh Plains.

In July 2024, al-Kildani instigated a mass change of political leaders in the Nineveh Plains that had been chosen by the Nineveh Provincial Council. The changes impacted the villages of Bakhdida, Bartella, and Tel Keppe, as well as the Yezidi-majority Sinjar. Afterwards he took credit for the changes, saying on Alawla TV "but today we have restored rights to the people of Nineveh…".

In 2025, it was reported that al-Kildani had ordered soldiers part of the NPU to gather 25 cards from friends or family to go towards Babylon affiliated candidates in elections (50 for Muslim members), with non-compliance resulting in termination or fines as high $66 per card that wasn't gathered. It was also alleged that al-Kildani had attempted to withhold salaries if members didn't interact with Babylon affiliated social media.

== Religious disputes ==
It is rumored that al-Kildani, a Chaldean Christian, converted to Islam in order to marry into his wife's family. Much of the scrutiny surrounding al-Kildani revolves around his conflict with the Chaldean Catholic Church, and its current patriarch, Cardinal Louis Raphaël Sako. Al-Kildani claims that he and the members of the Babylon Brigade are religiously Christian. Sako has condemned al-Kildani as a militia leader who does not represent the interests of Christians, publicly dissociating the Church from the group. In March 2016, the Chaldean Patriarchate announced that it had no connection with the militia or Rayan, that it did not represent it, and that its official representatives weren't representative of Assyrians or Christians in Iraq. In 2025, the Iraqi channel Al-Fallujah aired a report accusing al-Kildani of crimes against humanity, asserting that the Babylon Brigade was directly responsible for seizing Christian properties in the country.

In March 2023, the Babylon Brigade was instigated in the arrests of seven members of the Nineveh Plain Protection Units, as they had submitted a petition for the removal of the Babylon Brigade from the Hamdaniya district. In response, protests broke out amongst the Assyrians of Bakhdida, who were able to push out the militia from the district. Despite protests against Rayan and his militia, the Babylon Brigade absorbed the NPU under its wing, causing it to no longer be an independent security force for Assyrians in Iraq. Al-Kildani had successfully influenced Younan Hano, archbishop of the Syriac Catholic Church, into allowing his activities in the region.

Al-Kildani has previously engaged in public conflicts with Sako, with allegations from al-Kildani stating that the Chaldean Church had sold church properties. In July 2023, the feud was brought to light after Iraqi president Abdul Latif Rashid revoked the presidential decree recognizing the Chaldean Church in the country; it was alleged that al-Kildani had a hand in influencing the president's decision. This caused Sako to leave for Erbil in the autonomous Iraqi Kurdistan, calling the revocation "unprecedented in Iraq's history", highlighting "the government's silence" about the incident and emphasizing the suffering of the Iraqi Christian community. As a result, protests broke out in Ankawa against the decision and the Babylon Movement.

The alliance between al-Kildani and Bashar Warda, the current Archbishop of Erbil, has faced heavy criticism. Cardinal Sako accuses Warda of conspiring with al-Kildani to subvert his authority, labeling Warda as the "godfather" of the Babylon Movement, despite the serious human rights violations committed by its members. Sako also claims that Warda favors benefits from al-Kildani's support over Church interests.

The Babylon Movement was implicated in connection with the owners of the wedding hall destroyed in the 2023 Qaraqosh fire, which occurred at a Syriac Catholic wedding. Al-Kildani is also accused of instrumentalizing the tragedy to gain further influence in the Hamdaniya district. Earlier that year, he had faked a meeting with Pope Francis at the Vatican, which was clarified by an official Vatican spokesperson to be fabricated.
