= Shabak Brigade =

Shiite Muslim Shabak militia in the Nineveh Plains

- لواء الشبك
- Flag of the Shabak Democratic Party used by the militia
- Leaders: Waad Qado, Sabah Salem al-Shabaki
- Dates active: September 2014 – present
- Allegiance: Iraq
- Group: 30th Brigade
- Ideology: Shia Islamism; Anti-Americanism
- Size: c.500-1,500 (2014-2015)
- Part of: Popular Mobilization Forces
- Wars: Iraqi Civil War (2014–2017)

The Shabak Brigade, also known as the Shabak Militia or Liwa al-Shabak (Arabic: لواء الشبك), is an Iraqi armed group that was formed in 2014. The group was initially formed with around 1,500 militiamen in order to recover the Nineveh Plains from the Islamic State (ISIS).

== History ==
Headquartered in the historically Assyrian, Shabak majority town of Bartella, the Shabak Brigade is politically affiliated with the Shabak Democratic Assembly, and militarily operates under the leadership of the Badr Organization. The Shabak community had insisted on the formation of a Shabak militia after claims that the Kurdish Regional Government and Assyrian groups had expanded into Shabak lands, while also advocating for the formation of greater autonomy, protection of Shabaki cultural and religious sites, and a distinct Shabak-Shia identity. The Brigade was initially formed as the Nineveh Plains Forces (قوات سهل نينوی), not to be confused with the Nineveh Plain Forces. The Shabak Brigade is officially known as the "30th Brigade" of the Popular Mobilization Forces after November 23, 2014.

Former Shabak member of the Iraqi Parliament, Salim Juma, claimed that he obtained 'verbal approval' from the Iraqi Ministry of Defense for the creation of the force to 'fight ISIS terrorists.’ Unlike the case of the Babylon Brigades (Brigade 50), the overwhelming majority of the Shabak Brigade are local men. Although the militia was initially formed with 1500 members, videos recorded afterwards show no more than 500 active members, though estimates to the actual number couldn't be recorded. Videos later released by the group, however, appear to only show 500 fighters at most, though accurate estimates can not be drawn from said videos.

== Controversy ==
The Shabak Brigade has been at the centerpiece of controversy among those in the Popular Mobilization Forces due to its unpredictability. In addition to their positions in Bartella and surrounding Shabak areas, Brigade 30 controls the main trade highway between Mosul and Erbil. The Brigade's control over the checkpoint has been classified as illegal, but previous attempts by Prime Minister Haider al-Abadi and his successor Adil Abdul-Mahdi failed to reduce their presence in the checkpoint. The Brigade is known to place portraits of the Shiite Imam Ali and Hussein over areas they control.

The Shabak Brigade is also noted for its severe human rights violations against Assyrians in the Nineveh Plains. The Assyrian Policy Institute (API) reports that the presence of Brigade 30 in Bartella has disrupted Christian Assyrian resettlement post-ISIS. Brigade 30 soldiers have been accused of physical intimidation, rape, extortion, illegal arrests, kidnappings, and property theft. The API has recorded dozens of accounts of physical intimidation, sexual harassment, religious discrimination, robbery, and theft of land or property. Soldiers were also alleged to have threatened the town's primary Syriac Orthodox Church and its clergy.

Local populations fear that Brigade 30 is using the post-ISIS instability to seize a greater claim over cities like Qaraqosh (Bakhdida) and Bartella, and to advance demographic change in historically Assyrian areas. The shifting demographics in the Al-Hamdaniya District in recent decades have been a source of friction between Assyrians and Shabaks. Although Qusay Abbas stressed that these violations were not representative of the entire Shabak community, individual Shabaks have also been encouraged to discriminate against Assyrians.

The Shabak Brigade has also been accused of receiving missiles from Iran, and providing cover for facilities of the Iranian Revolutionary Guard in the Nineveh Plains, exacerbating the potential for a conflict in the region. Muslim scholars have also accused the Brigade of torturing prisoners.

== Sanctions ==
In July 2019, the United States levied sanctions against the group's leader, Waad Qado, for several human rights violations he committed as leader of the brigade.

Among these violations include stealing money from the population around Bartella through extortion, illegal arrests, and kidnappings. The 30th Brigade had also frequently detained people without warrants, or with fraudulent warrants, and has charged arbitrary customs fees at its checkpoints. Members of the local population had stated that the 30th Brigade has been responsible for egregious offenses including physical intimidation, extortion, robbery, kidnapping, and rape.

Although Qado no longer leads the Brigade, he retains a significant amount of influence through his election to the Iraqi Parliament, collecting around 21,000 votes.
