= Bartella =

Town in Ninawa, Iraq

- Saint George Church of Bartella

- Location within Iraq
- Coordinates: 36°21′8″N 43°22′47″E
- Country: Iraq
- Governorate: Ninawa
- Municipality: Al-Hamdaniya District

Government
  - Mayor: Nisan Karromi

Population (2018)
  - Total: 15,000+
- 30,000 prior to ISIS invasion
- Time zone: GMT +3
- Website: http://baretly.net/index.php

Bartella (Syriac: ܒܪܛܠܐ; Arabic: برطلّة) is a town that is located in the Nineveh Plains in northern Iraq, about 21 kilometres (13 miles) east of Mosul.

Bartella was liberated from ISIL control on October 20, 2016, by Iraqi Special Operations Forces along with the Nineveh Plain Protection Units and PMF Brigade 30, who both currently control and run the city's security.

The town is populated by Assyrian Christians and Shabaks. The town had an Assyrian Christian majority prior to the Northern Iraq offensive of ISIL, while the Shabak population has risen to at least 35% of the population or a majority.

== History ==
=== Early history ===
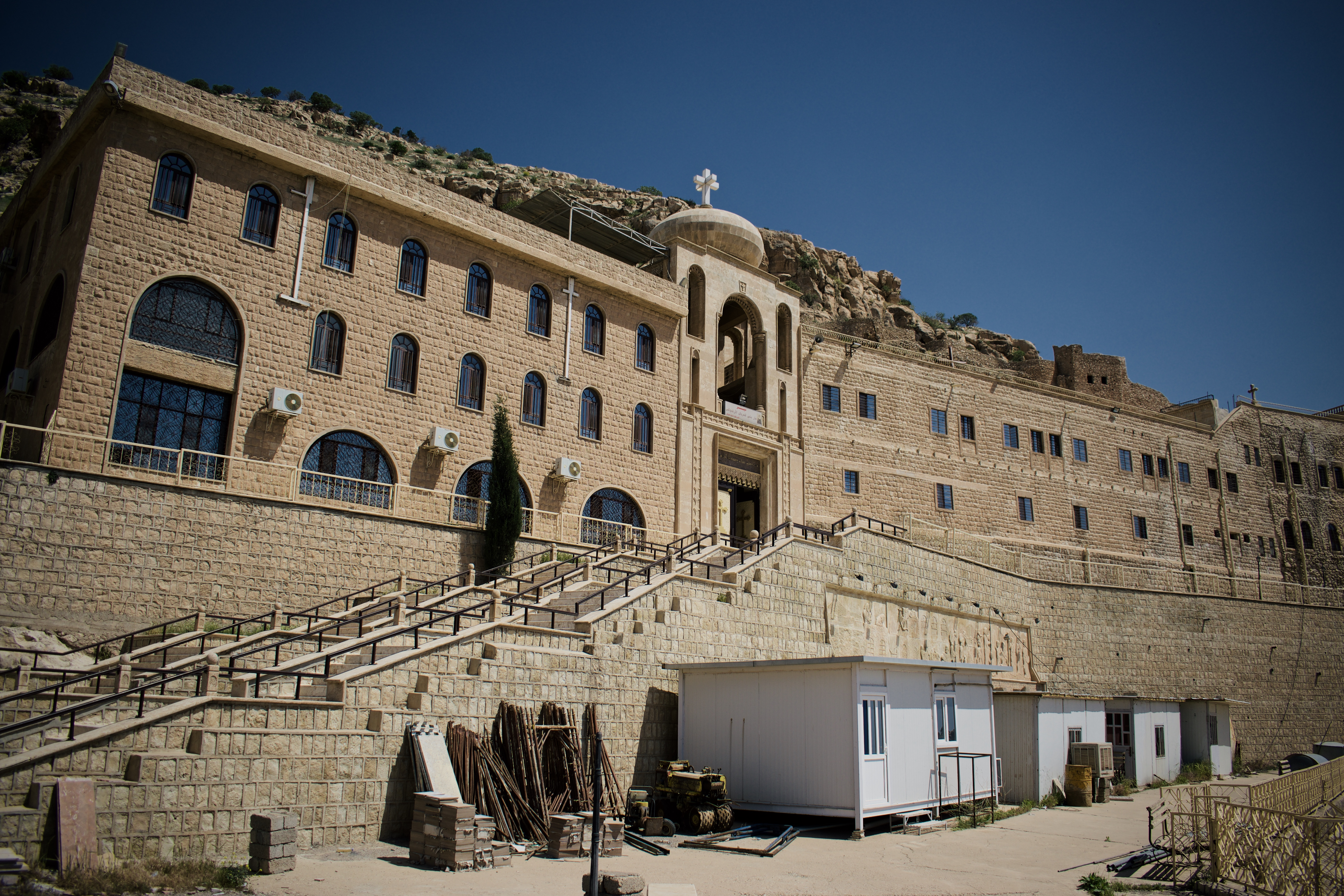
Mor Mattai Monastery near Bartella

The earliest known mention of Bartella was by Father Potrus Qasha in 1153, where he talked about Ignatius Elia'azar (1143–1164), the maphiryan of Ashur, making Bartella his home and see. Elia'azar reported directly to the Patriarch in Antioch, Syria. The congregation was upset with Elia'azar for changing the see location from the traditional Mor Mattai Monastery. An agreement was reached to return to Mar Mattai, with the tradition to visit Bartella regularly. Other maphiryans who made their see Bartella include:

- Dyonosius Saliba II (1222–1231)
- Gregorius Barsuma (1288–1308)
- Gregorius Mattai I (1317–1345)
- Gregorius Bar Qeenaya (d. 1361)
- Athinasius Abraham II (1365–1379)
- Cyril Joseph III (1458–1470)

In 1171, the Kurds attacked Bartella, as well as the Mor Mattai Monastery. When the people of Nineveh heard this, they joined forces to fight back and succeeded. However, the monks at the monastery learned of another encroaching attack and agreed to sign a peace treaty with the Kurds to avoid more bloodshed. They paid the Kurds 30 golden dinariis with the agreement. As soon as the Kurds received the gold, they gathered a larger army of 1,500 people and attacked the monastery, causing a crack in its wall. They entered and killed 15 monks, while the others escaped.

In 1201, a Christian priest and Muslim cleric in Bartella had a quarrel. The people in the town complained to the mayor, who punished the Muslim cleric with a beating. The cleric went to Mosul and gathered a large crowd by the main mosque, and later marched toward Bartella to destroy it. When they reached the town, the gates were closed and they couldn't enter. On their way back to Mosul, the mob broke into a church called MarZena and took all the valuables. Today, this church is the al-Khallal mosque.

In 1219, Sakhr Abu l-Barakat reportedly seized the Christian monastery (or monasteries) of Mar Yuhanan and Isho' Sabran, and it is claimed that all the monks within were massacred. In 1222, the Mir of Daseni allegedly declared that "if the Christians would put the sign of the cross on their foreheads, they would raise it over their heads,"

Between 1261 and 1369, the Mor Mattai Monastery was attacked by Kurds again, which impacted Bartella.

In 1745, Nader Shah, a Turkmen, attacked Bartella, killed many men and took many young men, girls and women away.

From 1756 to 1758, Bartella experienced great famine, which promoted more travel of the people of the town to purchase their needs. They suffered many robberies and attacks during these travels.

In 1789, Jolu Beg bin Bdagh, the Emir of Shikhan, exhausted Bartella of their goods while at war with the Arab Emir Mohammad bin Hasan al-Taa'i.

In the 18th century, Catholicism entered the city when Latin and Dominican monks opened a center to offer educational and medical services. In 1778, the Assyrians of Bakhdida were leaning towards Catholicism, which influenced some family members of the Aal Makrooh family in Bartella to convert. In 1780, Father Zakariya Kindo converted along with 40 other families. While there were some quarrels about using the church in Bartella between the Catholic and Orthodox priests in, they came a common understanding and accepted each other's choice of denomination.

Today, about one third of the town is Catholic, while the other two-thirds remain Orthodox.

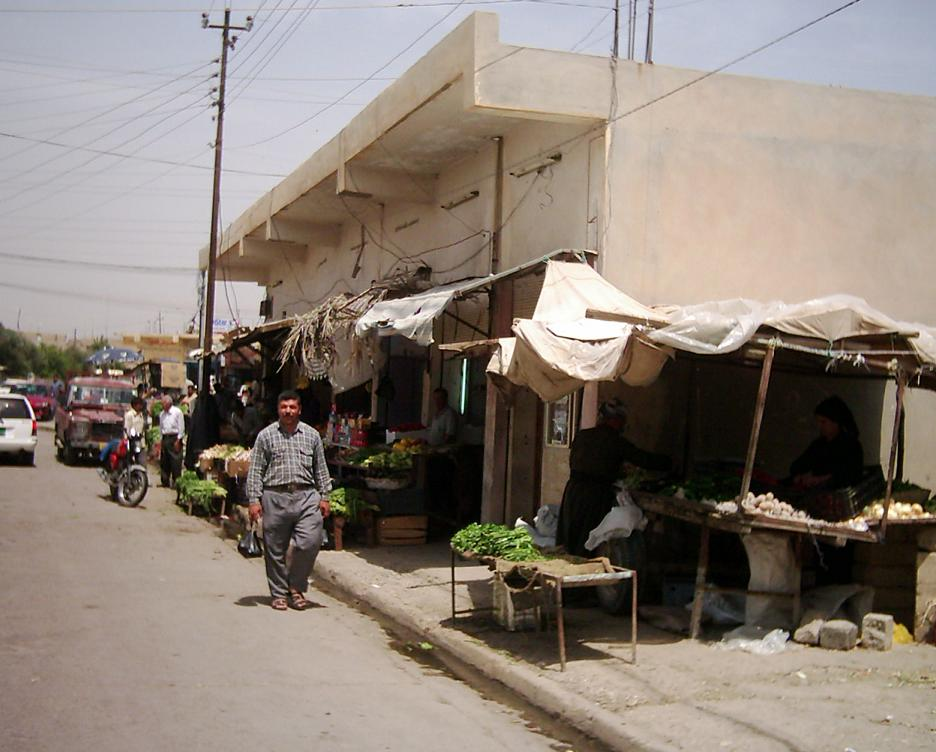
Street of Bartella

=== Latest events ===
On August 31, 2004, three girls from Bartella were slaughtered while returning home from their work at a hospital in Mosul where they worked. On November 19, 2004, two brothers from Bartella were killed while at work when a mortar shell fell on the shop they worked at in Mosul market.

On December 8, 2004, Dr. Ra'ad Augustine Qoryaqos, one of Bartella's notables and a successful surgeon who worked as a professor at the College of Medicine in University of Anbar, was murdered in Ramadi. A group of three terrorists stormed his clinic while he was checking on his patients, shot and left him bleeding. An operation later failed to save his life. Dr. Qoryaqos left behind his wife and two children.

On August 10, 2009, a pair of large flatbed trucks packed with bombs exploded simultaneously shortly after dawn, destroying a Shabak village known as Khazna, about 16 km (10 mi) east of Mosul and a few kilometres away from Bartella. The blast shattered windows at many homes in Bartella.

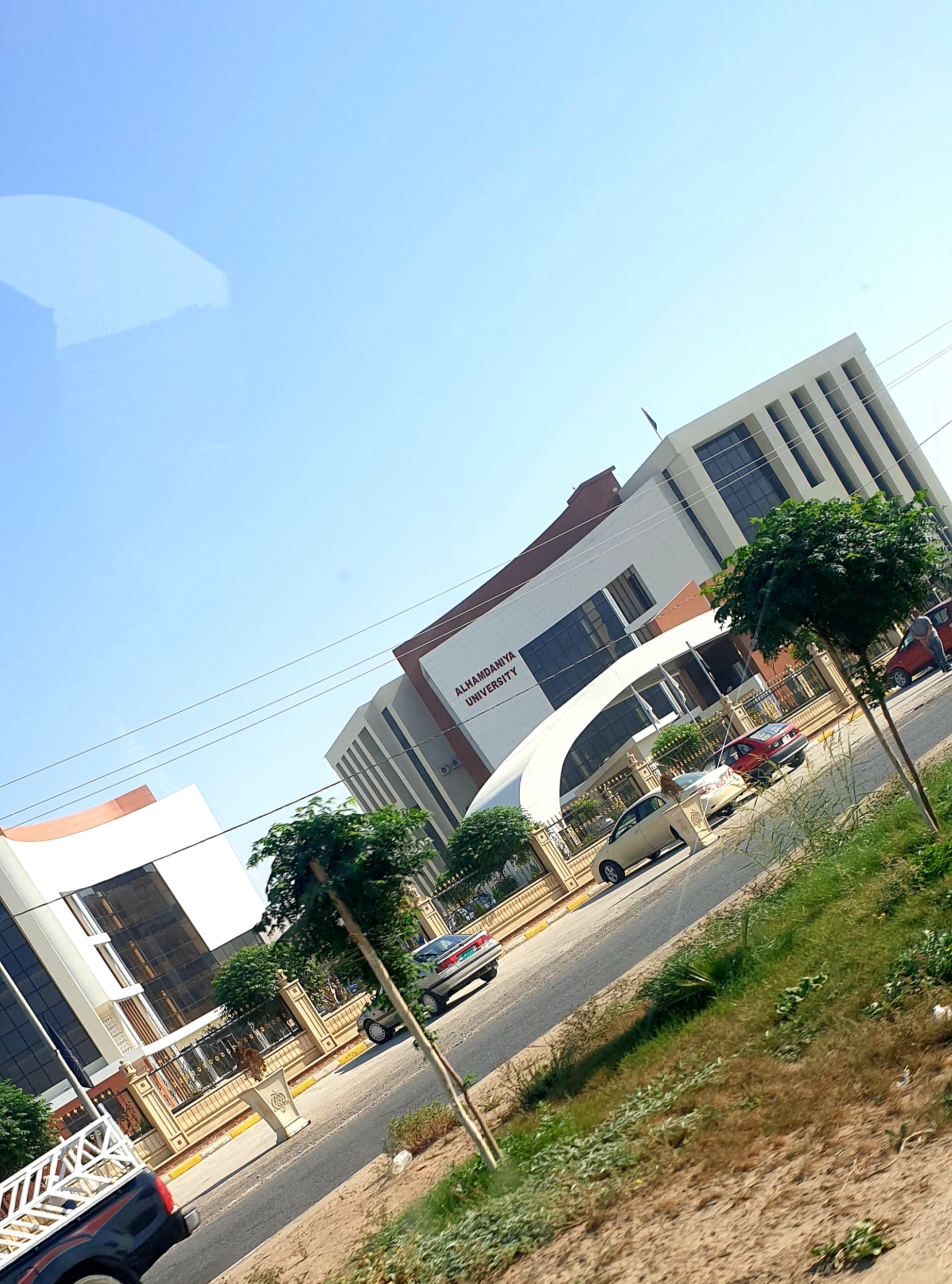
University of Al-Hamdaniya

On March 28, 2013, and during the passion week of Easter, a car bomb parked downtown not far from street of Bartella went off in the early hours of that day killing one local resident.

On August 3, 2014, many families from Bartella left the city to Erbil, Ankawa and Shekhan due to attacks by ISIL fighters. The Peshmerga forces were fighting them to retake ISIL-controlled Gogjali district west of Bartella.

On August 6, 2014, Peshmerga forces guarding the city ordered the remaining residents to leave, and pulled back to Erbil at around 8:30 pm. Over the night, the city was almost completely empty of its predominately Christian Assyrian residents. At around 4:30 am on August 7, the whole city was totally taken by ISIL militants in a bullet-less fall. On August 8, they burned liquor stores, looted houses and food stores, hung their flags on the church walls, pulled down the crosses and demanded the few remaining Christian locals of either converting to Islam, staying in the city and paying a yearly tax of $200, or facing "death by the sword" if refused to convert or pay.

In late August and early September 2014, it was reported that three residents of the few remaining Christian Assyrians, died. One was disabled, the other due to illness and old age and the third one was tortured then killed after he refused to convert to Islam.

In mid-September 2014, the 12 remaining residents managed to escape by faking conversion.

On October 20, 2016, as part of the Iraqi government offensive to retake Mosul, the Assyrian Nineveh Plain Protection Units and Iraqi Special Operations Forces (ISOF) liberated Bartella from ISIL control.

On December 24, 2016, the first post-liberation Christmas Eve mass was held at Mart Shmony Church.

== Churches of Bartella ==
Bartella and its vicinity has six churches, two partially demolished, one abandoned, one new, and two very old:

- Mar Aho Dama Church

This church was in existence in 1153 when was expanded by Maphrian Ignatius II La'Azer. It was in use till 1386. Excavation in its ruins found the remains of three bishops which were moved to Mart Shmony Church.

- Mart Shmony Church

It's unknown when this church was first built, however, it was reinvigorated for the first time in 1807, It was rebuilt again completely in 1869, and It was reinvigorated again in 1971.

- Mar Giwargis Church

There are two churches with this name. The first is in ruins (recently renovated and reused) and is believed to be a monastery for St. Jerjis who built it around 1701. The second church was completed in 1939.

- Church of the Virgin

This church was built in 1890 at the time of Qorlos Elias al-Mosuli who died in 1911. However, an inscription dating 16th century mentions the name of the Church of the Virgin which contradicts the date of 1890 and assumes that this church was standing at that time. The gate and part of the church were destroyed by ISIS sometime between August 2014 and October 2016.

- Al-Sayida Church

The complete demolition of Al-Sayida Church came in 1934 as its bricks were used to build the new Mar Giwargis Church.

- Ber Nagara Monastery

This monastery is named after Yohanan bit Nagara (St John Bar Nagaré) meaning "Yohanan of the Carpenters" since all his family were working as carpenters. It's believed that he used to worship pagans, and after converting to Christianity he was killed by his father and was buried in the village of Ba Agre. When this village was destroyed in 1282, his grave which was visited heavily by the locals was destroyed with it. That forced Maphrian Gregarious bin al-Ebry to build a temple for the martyr Yohanan in Bartella and was completed in 1285. On November 23, 1285, the remains of St. Yohanan, monks from Syria, and the 40 martyrs killed by the Persians were moved and reburied in this temple. Unfortunately, this monastery was destroyed in 1653 and again the remains were moved to St. Shmony church. Currently, all what exist of this monastery is a small room built recently as a reminder to its existence.

- The Monastery of the Forty Martyrs

This monastery is still frequented by parishioners, while a part of it is demolished. It dates back to 1269.

- Mar Youhanna Monastery

This monastery is ancient without a known date of construction. It sits on the side of the main road north of Bartella.

- Mar Daniel Monastery

Mar Daniel is on a small hill near Bartella. It is named after Mar Daniel the Hermit, who ventured to Nineveh from Diyar Bakir with Mar Mattai in the year 363. This monastery is also known locally as the "Monastery of the Beetles" due to the large numbers of small beetles that appeared during the three-day festival on October 20. Forty minutes by foot from the "upper monastery" is a "lower monastery", which is commonly where the monks lived. Arab historians have called it al-Khalidi, al-Shabishti and Yaqut.

== Population ==
In early August 2014, Bartella was overrun by ISIL Islamic extremists. The Christian population of the town fled, mostly to Erbil, joining thousands of other Iraqi Christians fleeing ISIL terror. Before the ISIL invasion, the population was around 30,000, with the majority being ethnic Assyrian Syriac Christians, including Syriac Catholics and Syriac Orthodox Christians. Bartella was Christianized in the 2nd century. With the emergence of the Christological controversies, the people and their church came under the dominion of the Church of the East (historically known as the Nestorian Church); however, it switched to the Syriac Orthodox Church (historically known as Jacobite) around 610. On November 23–24, 2013 during the 2-day "Bartella Friends" conference held in Erbil to discuss the demographic change due to the Shabak exodus fleeing Mosul and the surrounding villages towards Bartella from 2003. It was announced that the percentage of Christians has dropped dramatically from 99% to 40%.

== Industry ==
Bartella was known in Nineveh to have some of the best goldsmiths. Tahini is one of the main food products in the town. Weddings and festivals also inspire various craftsmanship in the town.

== Culture ==
Every Sunday or festival day (holy feast days) between the engagement and the marriage, the groom's mother hosts the women and girls in her home, where they prepare trays of treats including seeds, sweets and dried fruit. The plates are covered with colorful fabric and taken to the bride's home to be presented to her. A few days prior to the wedding, the wall above the front of door of the couple's future home is painted with beautiful colors and decorated with various flowers. The walls of the couple's room are newly painted as well, since they typically became darkened with smoke from the indoor fires used for heat in the winter. Christian symbols were also painted on the walls to protect from bad spirits.

== Gallery ==
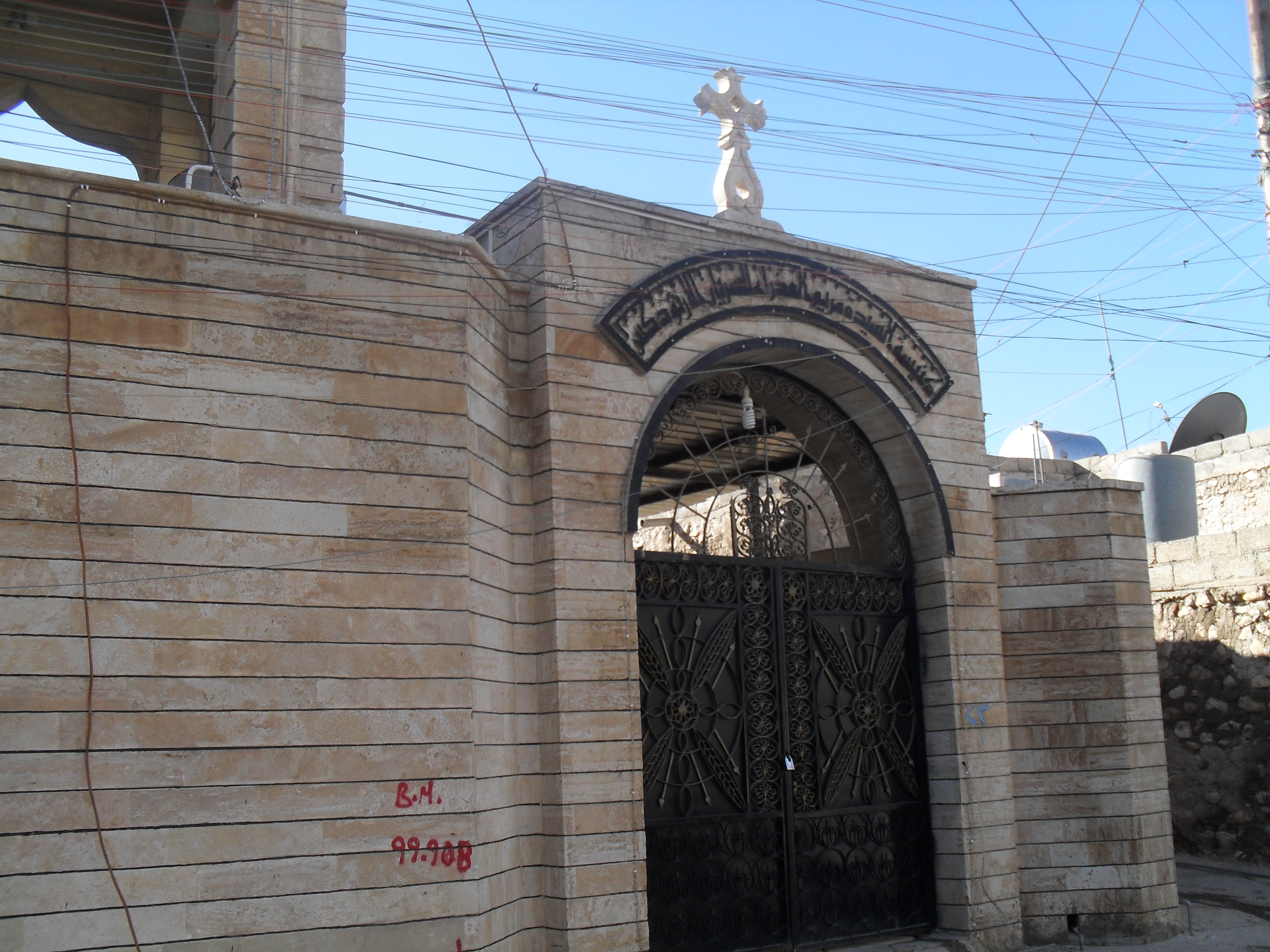
Syriac Orthodox Church of the Virgin Mary, pictured in December 2013

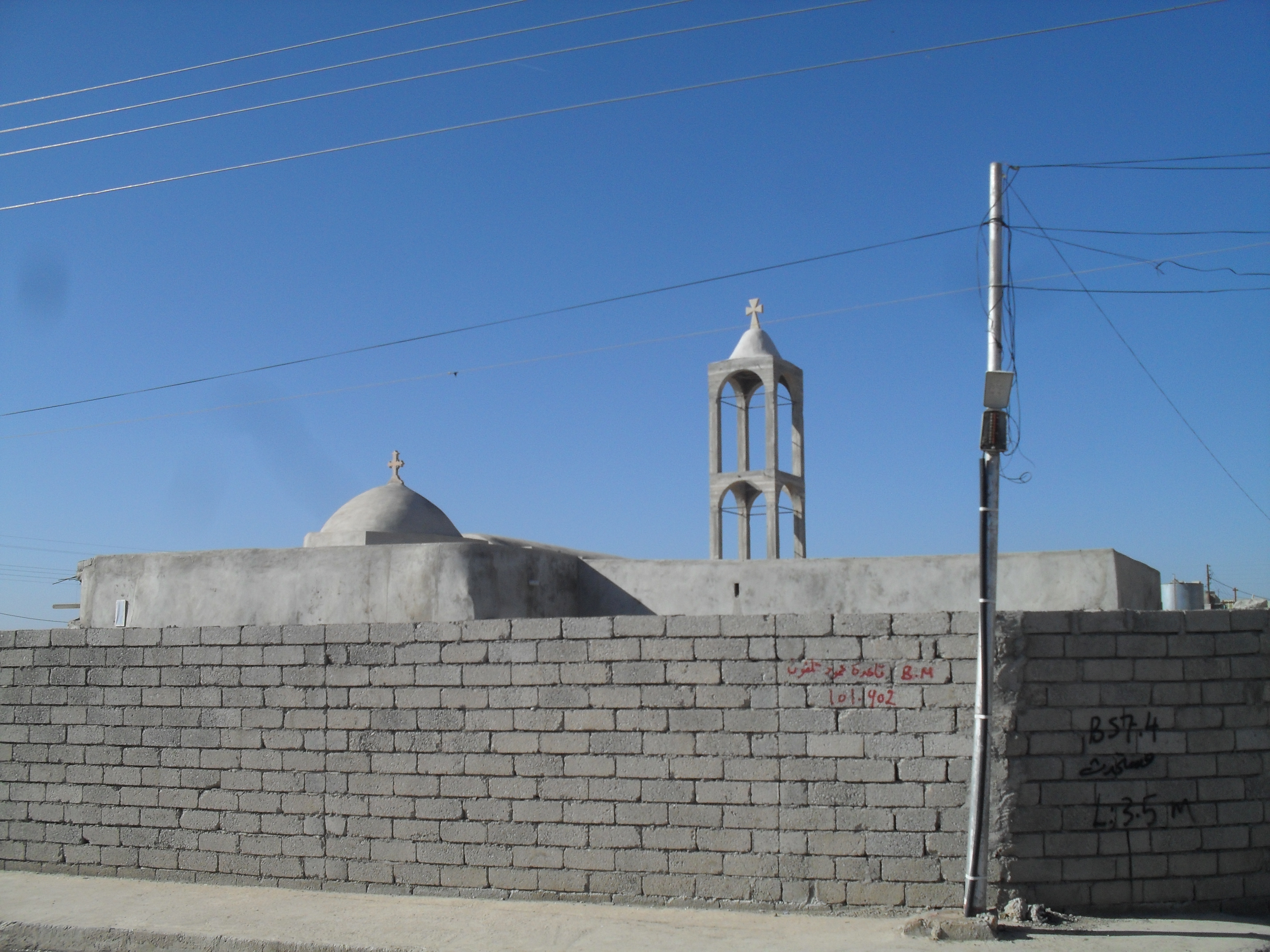
Former Mar Giwargis Syriac Orthodox Church, pictured in December 2013

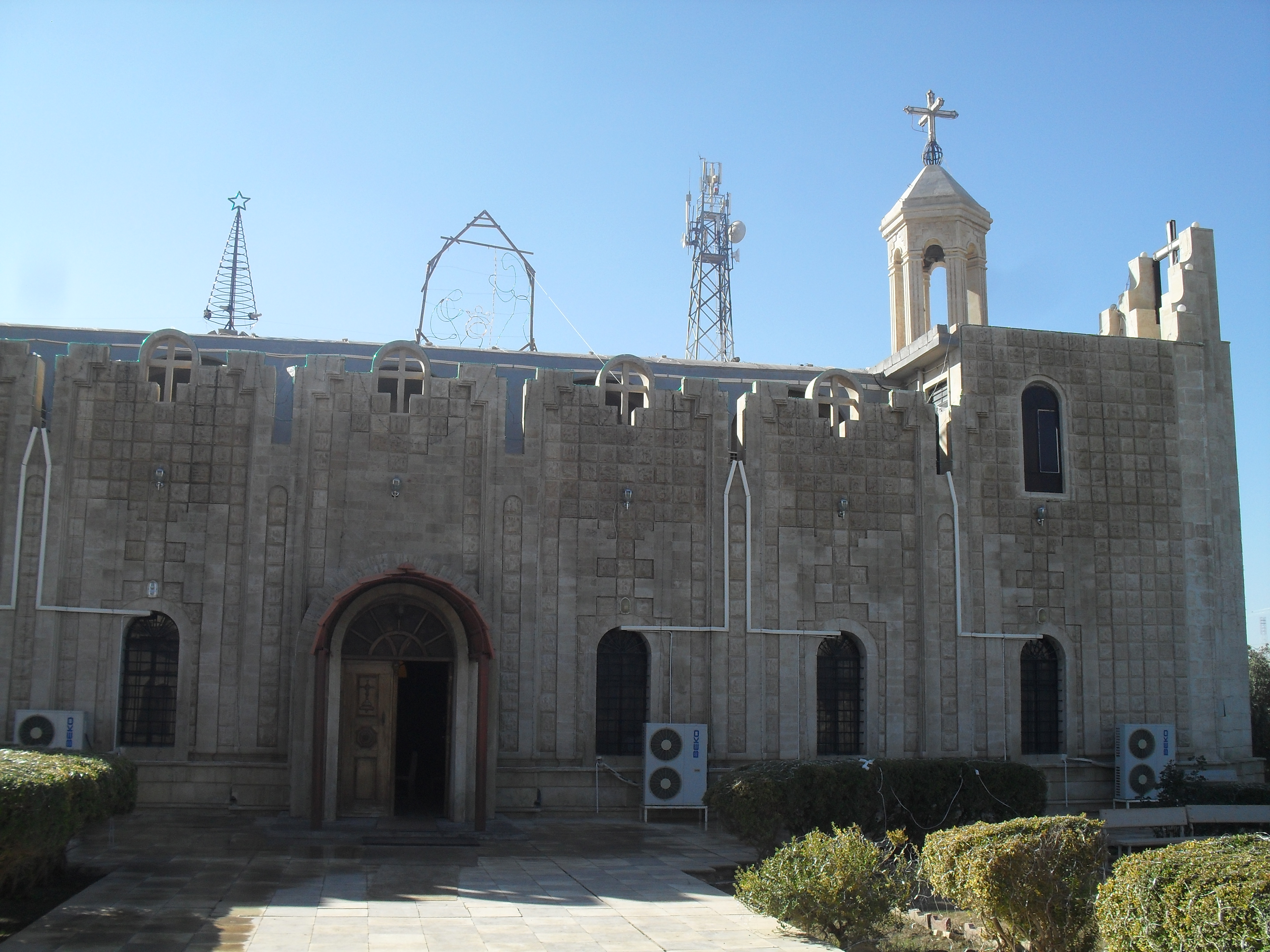
Current Mar Giwargis Syriac Catholic Church, pictured in December 2013

== See also ==
- Assyrian homeland
- Proposals for Assyrian autonomy in Iraq
- Assyrians in Iraq
- List of Assyrian settlements
- Bakhdida
- Karemlesh
