= Nineveh Plain Protection Units =

Assyrian militia in Iraq

- ܚܕܝ̈ܘܬ ܣܬܪܐ ܕܫܛܚܐ ܕܢܝܢܘܐ
- Emblem of the NPU
- Leader: Colonel Jawad Habib
- Dates active: December 2014 – present
- Allegiance: Assyrian Democratic Movement
- Active regions: Nineveh Plains, Northern Iraq
- Status: Active
- Size: 600 active (2020); 2,000 registered (2020)
- Part of: Iraqi Armed Forces; Nineveh Operations Command

The Nineveh Plain Protection Units (Classical Syriac: ܚܕܝ̈ܘܬ ܣܬܪܐ ܕܫܛܚܐ ܕܢܝܢܘܐ Ḥḏāywāṯ Settārā da-Šṭāḥā d-Nīnwē; Arabic: وحدات حماية سهل نينوى) or NPU is an Assyrian paramilitary organization that was formed in late 2014, largely but not exclusively by Assyrians in Iraq to defend themselves against the Islamic State of Iraq and Syria (ISIS). The Nineveh Plains is a region where Assyrians originate from and have lived there for thousands of years.

== Statistics ==
By December 2014, the group said it had between 500 and 1,000 men in training and that the US was helping train them, and that financial support was coming mostly from the Assyrian diaspora in the US and Europe. In February 2015, there were unverified reports that the group had 5,000 Assyrian men registered to be trained, 500 are already training for combat, and 500 volunteers from the group stationed in threatened towns.

The Assyrian Policy Institute reported in 2020 that the NPU had 2,000 men registered to be trained awaiting approval and funding from the Federal government of Iraq and that they had 600 active soldiers deployed and running the security in towns such as Bakhdida, Karamlesh, partly in Bartella and the ancient city of Nimrud.

A 2019 testimony from Assyrian activist Reine Hanna at the United States Commission on International Religious Freedom claimed that the rate of Assyrian return in towns guarded by the NPU was significantly higher than those controlled by other forces following the end of the Islamic State's occupation of the Nineveh Plain. The NPU-guarded Assyrian town of Bakhdida, for example, saw a 70% return of the town's original Assyrian population (about 35,000 Assyrians). In Tesqopa, which is controlled by KRG Peshmerga, the rate of return is about 20% of the original Assyrian population. In Tel Keppe, which is controlled by Brigade 50, the return rate of the original Assyrian population is about 7%.

== Activities ==
In May 2016, NPU participated in fighting at Tesqopa along with Peshmerga forces in order to capture the town from ISIS.

In September 2016, NPU soldiers repelled an ISIL effort to retake Tesqopa.

Also in September 2016, NPU liberated the Shabak village of Badanah from ISIL, with the support of international coalition airstrikes.

In October 2016, NPU, alongside Iraqi Army forces liberated the Town of Bartella from ISIL.

On the 19th of October, 2016, NPU and the Iraqi Army liberated the Town of Bakhdida from ISIL. They currently run the security profile of the town and protected the town during its first Christmas mass in two years.

In December 2016 Jameel al-Jameel, a member of the Nineveh Plains Protection Units claimed that Kurdish soldiers at checkpoints were interrogating and preventing Assyrian NPU soldiers and civilians seeking to enter the Nineveh Plain.

In July 2017, NPU was involved in clashes with the Babylon Brigades, led by Rayan al-Kildani. Two days prior to the incident, NPU captured 6 members of the Babylon Brigades on allegations of stealing ancient artefacts from Mar Behnam Monastery. Babylon Brigades have since been expelled by the Iraqi Prime Minister Office & PMU High Command from all of Hamdaniya District. NPU has taken control of Mar Behnam Monastery.

In December 2018, the Iraqi Government provided funding to the NPU to recruit another 100 troops.

Following the Iraqi elections in 2021, the NPU was reorganized into a sub-unit of the Babylon Brigade, despite protests from the local population. In 2023, the NPU submitted a request for the restoration of its previous status as a Tribal Mobilization Force under the Nineveh Operations Command. However, this was met with retaliation from the Babylon Brigade at the March 14th separation negotiations and the seizure of seven NPU soldiers, sparking further protests among the residents of Qaraqosh.

Beginning from the 19th of October 2025, reports began circulating of the NPU's reinstatement within the region. Deriving from the PMF's head, Falih al-Fayyadh, the order was given to restore the NPU as an independent force in the region after it had been forcibly merged with the Babylon Brigade. Local Assyrians, by that point, had consistently and publicly protested against the merger of the NPU with Babylon Brigade, a group made up of mostly Shia Arabs. Following the militias reinstatement, Colonel Jawad Habib has been restored as the commander-in-chief of the NPU. To enforce the new decision, the PMF alongside the Iraqi Army are said to have dispatched special forces to the Nineveh Plains, forcing the Babylon Brigade out of the area without armed confrontation. It was reported on the 26th of October 2025, that NPU leaders are working to secure approval to defend all Assyrian towns and cities within the Nineveh Plains.

On the 29th of October 2025, it was announced that the Syriac Catholic Church played a crucial and decisive role in the return of the NPU, as well as the removal of the Babylon Brigade from the Nineveh Plains. An image shared by one of the NPU's official social media accounts further confirms the church's involvement. The image shows the Assyrian bishop Mar Benedict Younan Hanno together with the newly reinstated NPU commander, Jawad Habib, on a joint tour through the city of Qaraqosh.

== Security ==
The Nineveh Plains Protection Units currently run the security in all major towns in the Al-Hamdaniya District (Bakhdida and Karamlesh), while in Bartella the security is contested by PMF Brigade 30 or known as the Shabak Militia with the support of the Badr Organization leaving the NPU outnumbered. As of 2020, Nimrud was also under the control of the Nineveh Plains Protection Units.

== See also ==
- List of armed groups in the Iraqi Civil War
- Assyrian Democratic Movement
- Nineveh Plain Forces
- Nineveh Plains Security Forces
- Dwekh Nawsha
