= Qaraqosh Protection Committee =

Assyrian milta in Iraq

- Leaders: Sarkis Aghajan Mamendo; Sabah Behnem
- Dates active: 2008–2014
- Headquarters: Qaraqosh, Iraq
- Active regions: Ninawa Governorate
- Size: 1,200
- Part of: Chaldean Syriac Assyrian Popular Council
- Wars: the Iraq War and the 2014 Northern Iraq offensive

The Qaraqosh Protection Committee (also known as the Nineveh Plains Security Forces) is an armed militia formed by Assyrians living in the city of Bakhdida, in Ninawa Governorate of Iraq. The committee, formed in 2004, was organized through local churches, and began manning checkpoints and was soon working with the Iraqi police.

== Persecution during the Iraq War ==
Assyrians in post-Saddam Iraq have faced a high rate of persecution by Fundamentalist Islamists since the beginning of the Iraq War. By early August 2004, this persecution included church bombings, and fundamentalist groups' enforcement of Muslim codes of behavior upon Assyrian Christians, e.g., banning alcohol, forcing women to wear hijab. The violence against the community has led to the exodus of perhaps as much as half of the community. While Assyrians only made up 5% of the total Iraqi population before the war, according to the United Nations, Assyrians comprise as much as 40% of the growing Iraqi refugees who are stranded in Syria, Jordan, Lebanon, and Turkey.

The coordinator for the Qaraqosh Protection Committee, Sabah Behnem, said outside agendas—from the Sunnis of al-Qaeda to the Shi'a in Iran—were "behind the efforts to displace Iraqi Christians."

On Tuesday, October 12, 2010, the Qaraqosh Protection Committee, in coordination with the Kurdish Asayish Forces, captured Ali Muhammad Idris Sadeq, a top Al-Qaeda leader, in the town of Qaraqosh (Bakhdida).

The Qaraqosh Protection Committee reorganized after the Islamic State of Iraq and the Levant overran the Nineveh Plains in 2014. It is now known as the Nineveh Plains Security Forces and cooperates closely with the Kurdish Peshmerga and Asayish.

== See also ==
- Nineveh Plain Protection Units
- List of armed groups in the Iraqi Civil War
