= Anne Nafi Aussi =

Iraqi-Assyrian former government minister

Ann Nafi Aussi
- آن نافع اوسي
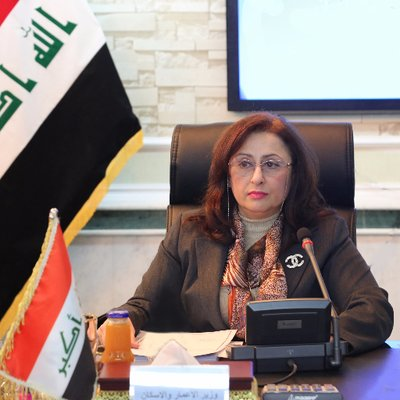

Minister of Construction, Housing and Municipalities
- In office 17 August 2016 – 25 October 2018
- Preceded by: Tariq Al-Khaikani
- Succeeded by: Bangen Rekani

Personal details
- Born: 23 September 1964 (age 61) Baghdad, Iraqi Republic (now Iraq)
- Education: University of Baghdad
- Profession: Engineer

Ann Nafi Aussi Balbol (Note: Arabic: آن نافع اوسي) (born 23 September 1964) is an Iraqi-Assyrian politician who was the Minister of Construction and Housing in the Iraqi government from 2016 to 2018.

== Early life ==
Aussi was born in Baghdad on 23 September 1964, and graduated with a Bachelor of Civil Engineering from the University of Baghdad in 1986. She continued her educated during and after the US invasion and received a Master of Science in Civil Engineering/Construction's Jurisdiction, also from the University of Baghdad, as well as a Doctor of Philosophy in Engineering/Civil Engineering/Construction's Jurisdiction.

== Career ==
Aussi was formally elected to the position of Minister in 2016, having sworn in under the Constitution of Iraq and vowing that she was part of no political party. Addressing a press conference, Aussi stated "the ministry is Iraqi and its goal is to serve the country." Aussi's appointment was opposed by Turkmen politicians. After her appointment, she attended a ceremony by the Ministry to commemorate World Habitat Day alongside the United Nations, and confirmed sectors that were most in need of reconstruction after the Islamic State was defeated.

In 2017, Aussi participated in a conference alongside other government officials to discuss the developments of the country and its infrastructure. The conference was hosted by the Iraq Britain Business Council in Dubai.

Aussi has designed bridges across Baghdad since the beginning of her career as in engineer in 1988, and has also contributed to parts of multi-story buildings throughout the capital. She has also met with officials from Jordan to rehabilitate a highway connecting the two countries from Umm Qasr Port in Basra to the Port of Aqaba. During the same year, Aussi also coordinated meetings between Iraq and the Islamic Republic of Iran to increase mutual cooperation and trade between the two countries.

Aussi unsuccessfully attempted to win re-election for her position as minister in 2018, being supported by the Assyrian Democratic Movement and running under the National Rafidain List.

== Personal life ==
Shortly after her appointment as Minister, Aussi was attacked by unidentified gunmen but was unharmed. The Ministry condemned the attack, and Aussi also made her own response, saying "These cowardly terrorist attempts will not deter it from continuing to give and provide services to citizens and harnessing all possible capabilities in order to provide the appropriate atmosphere for the return of the displaced and the reconstruction of the liberated areas."

In her post-governmental career, Aussi has continued to be involved with developing the infrastructure of Iraq, including speaking out against corruption.
