= Tal Qasab =

- Village
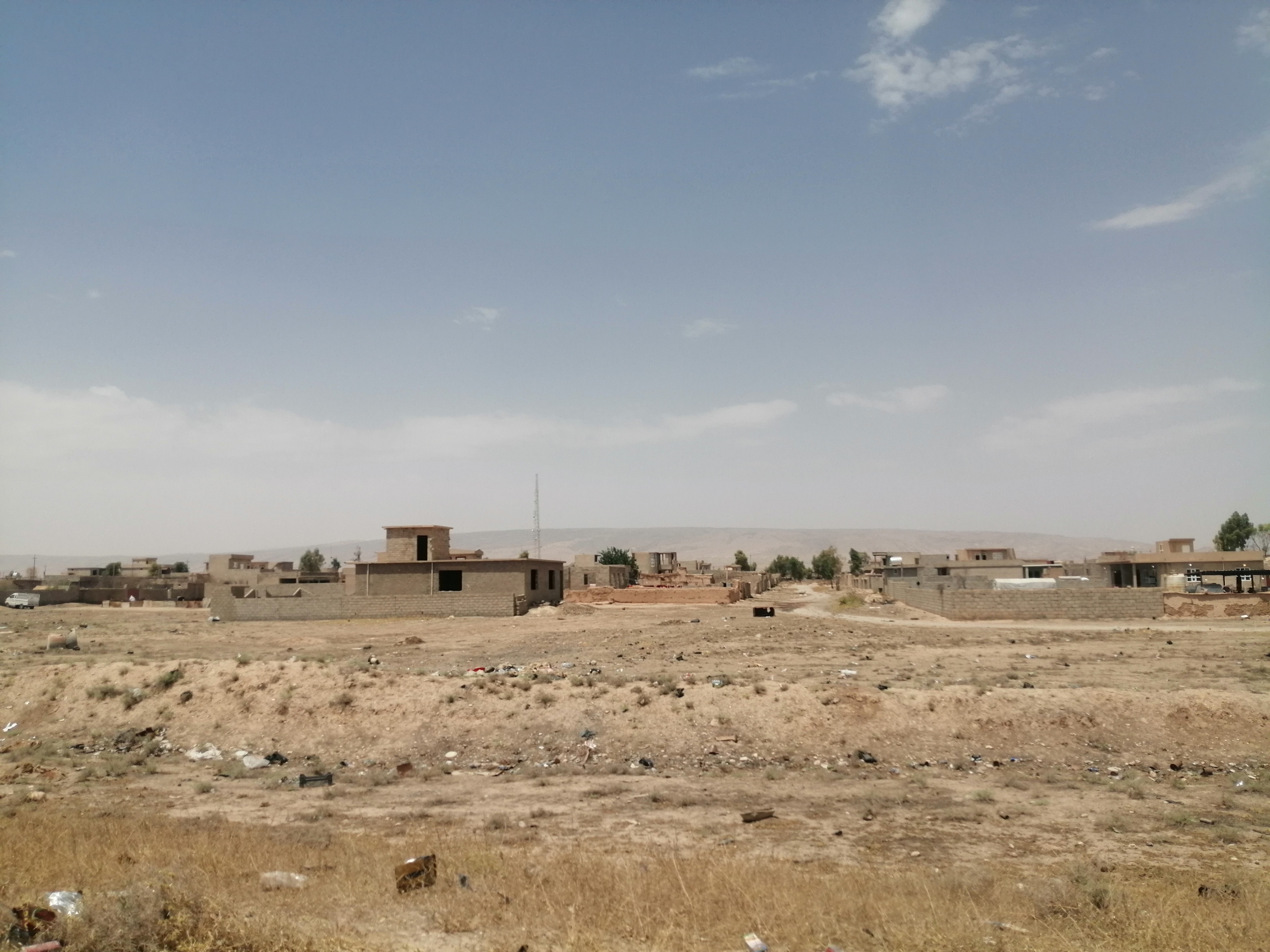

- Location in Iraq
- Coordinates: 36°15′30″N 41°56′35″E
- Country: Iraq
- Governorate: Ninawa
- District: Sinjar District

Population (July 2014)
  - Total: 18,000

Tal Qasab (also Tal Qassab, Tel Qasab or Tel Kassab, Arabic: تل قصب; Kurdish: ته‌ل قه‌سه‌ب, romanized: Tel Qeseb, also known in Arabic as Baath) is a village located in the Sinjar District of the Ninawa Governorate in Iraq. The village is located south of the Sinjar Mount. It belongs to the disputed territories of Northern Iraq.

Tal Qasab is populated by Yazidis.
