= Emanuel Khoshaba Youkhana =

Politician

Personal details
- Born: 1 January 1963 (age 63) Kirkuk, Iraq
- Party: Assyrian Patriotic Party
- Children: 3

Emanuel Khoshaba Youkhana (Arabic: عمانوئيل خوشابا يوخنا) is the current president of the Assyrian Patriotic Party, based in Iraq. He became part of the party's council in 2002, and subsequently became vice-president in 2006.

He graduated from Baghdad Institute of Technology in 1984. While a student, he was active with mobilizing the Assyrian youth in the capital, and joined the Assyrian Patriotic Party in the mid-1980s.

He ran for the Iraqi parliament on 12 May 2018, winning 19,422 votes (16.11%) and a seat.
