= Assyrian Patriotic Party =

Assyrian Patriotic Party ܓܒܐ ܐܬܪܢܝܐ ܐܬܘܪܝܐ
- Leader: Emanuel Khoshaba Youkhana
- Founded: July 14, 1973
- Headquarters: Baghdad
- Paramilitary wing: Dwekh Nawsha
- Ideology: Assyrian nationalism Republicanism; Conservatism
- National affiliation: Athra Alliance

Website
- www.atranaya.net

The Assyrian Patriotic Party (Assyrian Neo-Aramaic: ܓܒܐ ܐܬܪܢܝܐ ܐܬܘܪܝܐ, commonly known as Atranaya) is a political party in Iraq representing Assyrians that has been led by Emanuel Khoshaba Youkhana, since the 4th APP conference in Duhok in 2011. In 2018 they allied with the Assyrian Democratic Movement in a political group called the National Rafidain List for the 2018 Iraqi parliamentary election.

== History ==
The Assyrian Patriotic Party was founded on July 14, 1973, in Baghdad, during the visit of Yaqo Malik Ismail to Iraq, who was accompanied by a delegation from the Assyrian Universal Alliance. Within a short period of establishing the party, because of the nationalist drift between young Assyrian number of members belonging to the party palhundreds, even though the party was a secret to be done, he had been working very actively under the various aspects of social activities, sports and cultural rights. The birth of the party imposed the need to frame the tide growing nationalism among young Assyrians in general and university, and are not dispersed National Action and poured in a political way possible in which to go forward and take advantage of the experiences and practices of national past and to create continuity in the work and gain experience and accumulation in order to serve our people's cause.

In 2018 they allied with the Assyrian Democratic Movement in a political group called the National Rafidain List for the 2018 Iraqi parliamentary election and won a seat in Dahuk.

On July 22, 2023 the party joined the Athra Alliance, a political alliance representing Assyrian interests in Iraq.

== ISIS and the persecution of Assyrian Christians in Iraq ==
In response to the killings against the Assyrian Christians and other minorities, and the rise of Sunni Islamists such as the Islamic State of Iraq and the Levant (ISIS), the party set up the Dwekh Nawsha, which stands for The Sacrifiers in the Assyrian Neo-Aramaic language. Dwekh Nawsha was formed to "protect Christian territories in Nineveh province, particularly the northern part of Nineveh," according to the group's leader, Albert Kisso. It had 70 active members as of November 2014. It currently has over 250 members in the Nineveh Plains, which is the heartland of the Assyrian people.

Several foreign fighters have joined the Dwekh Nawsha.
