= Babylon Movement =

Iraqi political party

Babylon Movement ܙܘܥܐ ܕܒܒܠ حركة بابليون بزووتنەوەی بابل
- Leader: Rayan al-Kildani
- Founded: 2014; 12 years ago
- Headquarters: Baghdad, Iraq
- Military wing: Babylon Brigade
- Religion: Syriac Christianity (official)
- Council of Representatives of Iraq: 2 / 329 (0.6%)
- Kurdistan Region Parliament: 1 / 100 (1%)

Babylon Brigade
- كتائب بابليون
- Flag used by Babylon Brigade
- Leader: Rayan al-Kildani
- Allegiance: Iraq
- Group: 50th Brigade
- Size: 1,000+
- Part of: Popular Mobilization Forces
- Wars: War in Iraq (2013–2017)

The Babylon Movement (Arabic: حركة بابليون, Syriac: ܙܘܥܐ ܕܒܒܠ) is a political party in Iraq founded in 2014. The party's armed wing is the Babylon Brigades, a militia that was formed as part of Iraq's Popular Mobilization Forces. Rayan al-Kildani currently leads the party since founding it in 2014.

The party, through its incorporation into the Popular Mobilization Forces, has close ties to the Badr Organization and IRGC. Since the defeat of ISIS, the Babylon Movement has been accused of a multitude of human rights abuses, including illegal land seizures in the Nineveh Governorate and election corruption. While the party claims to represent the interests of Iraqi Christians, primarily the Assyrian people, a majority of the party's voters and members are Shia Muslim, since a ruling in 2009 designated that any Iraqi could vote for designated minority seats.

== History ==
The Babylon Movement was founded in 2014, initially as a militia group in order to defend the Nineveh Plains from the onset of ISIS. The movement had been the only Christian component of the Popular Mobilization Forces, and had about 1000 fighters. The brigade had taken part in the large scale defense of the Nineveh governorate with the Battle of Mosul, and helped to liberate the city from ISIS.

The Babylon Movement entered the Iraqi parliamentary elections in 2014 and 2018, however they weren't able to attain any results until 2021. Allegations have been leveled towards al-Kildani regarding vote corruption in the attainment of these seats in the election. He obtained similar results in the 2023 Iraqi governorate elections.

On July 18, 2019, the U.S. Treasury Department sanctioned al-Kildani for alleged human rights violations, including harassment and blackmailing of women and illegal land seizures.

== Public relations ==
The Chaldean Catholic Church issued a statement confirming that it has nothing to do with the Babylon Brigades, nor Rayan as its leader or its members in the Iraqi parliament, and that it doesn't represent them. The Babylon Movement has previously engaged in public spats with Cardinal Sako of the church, with both sides accusing each other of stealing properties for the benefit of themselves and/or their respective organization. The church has since distanced itself from the Babylon Movement and Rayan.

However, Archbishop Bashar Warda, a prominent leader within the Chaldean Catholic Church, continues to express unwavering support for the Babylon Movement, despite the well-documented record of severe human rights abuses by the group. This alliance has drawn sharp criticism, particularly from Cardinal Louis Sako, who accuses Warda of acting as the Godfather of the Babylon Movement and prioritizing benefits from Rayan al-Kildani over the protection of church interests.

It was also denied by Assyrian Christian MPs such as Imad Youkhana and Yonadam Kanna, where the representatives stated that the Babylon Brigades and their leader do not represent Christians, that Rayan himself is far from Christianity and the battalions led by him represent him personally. The movement has been implicated in several instances of prior human rights violations against Assyrians, including looting of villages, kidnapping of members of the Nineveh Plain Protection Units, and the Bakhdida wedding fire.

The Babylon Movement has also been noted for its hijacking of Assyrian political representation in Iraq. In 2024, al-Kildani instituted a mass change of political leadership in the Nineveh Plains with Babylon Movement proxies, replacing 15 leaders appointed by the Kurdish-backed Nineveh Provincial Council. Previous elections in 2021 and the takeover of NPU in 2023 have been condemned and criticized, and the Babylon Movement as well as Rayan and his affiliated remain deeply unpopular among Assyrians in Iraq.

== See also ==
- Kataib Rouh Allah Issa Ibn Miriam
