= Nineveh Plains =

Region in Iraq

Coordinates: 36°37′N 43°7′E

Nineveh Plains سهل نينوى ܦܩܥܬܐ ܕܢܝܢܘܐ ده‌شتا نه‌ینه‌وا
- Region
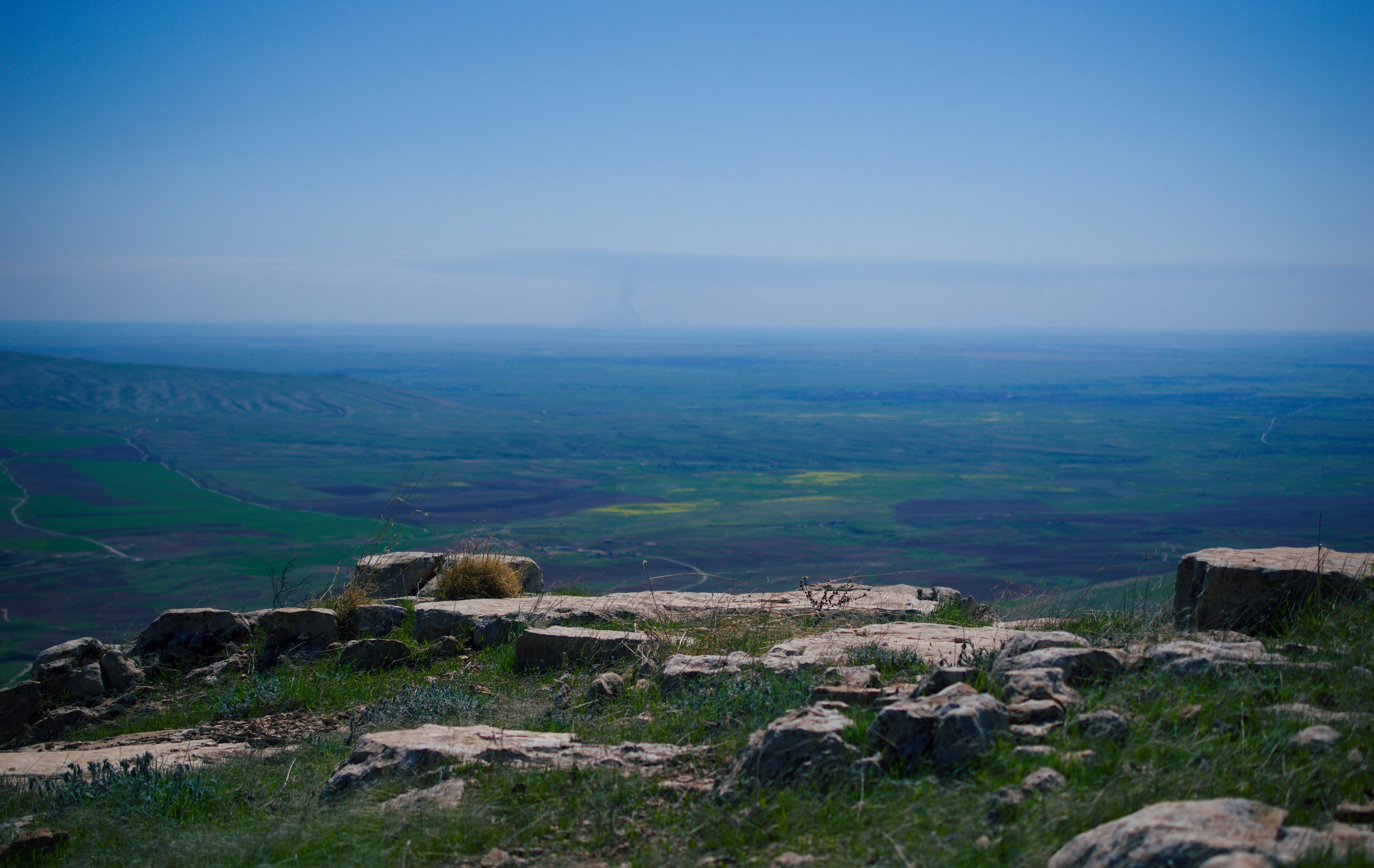
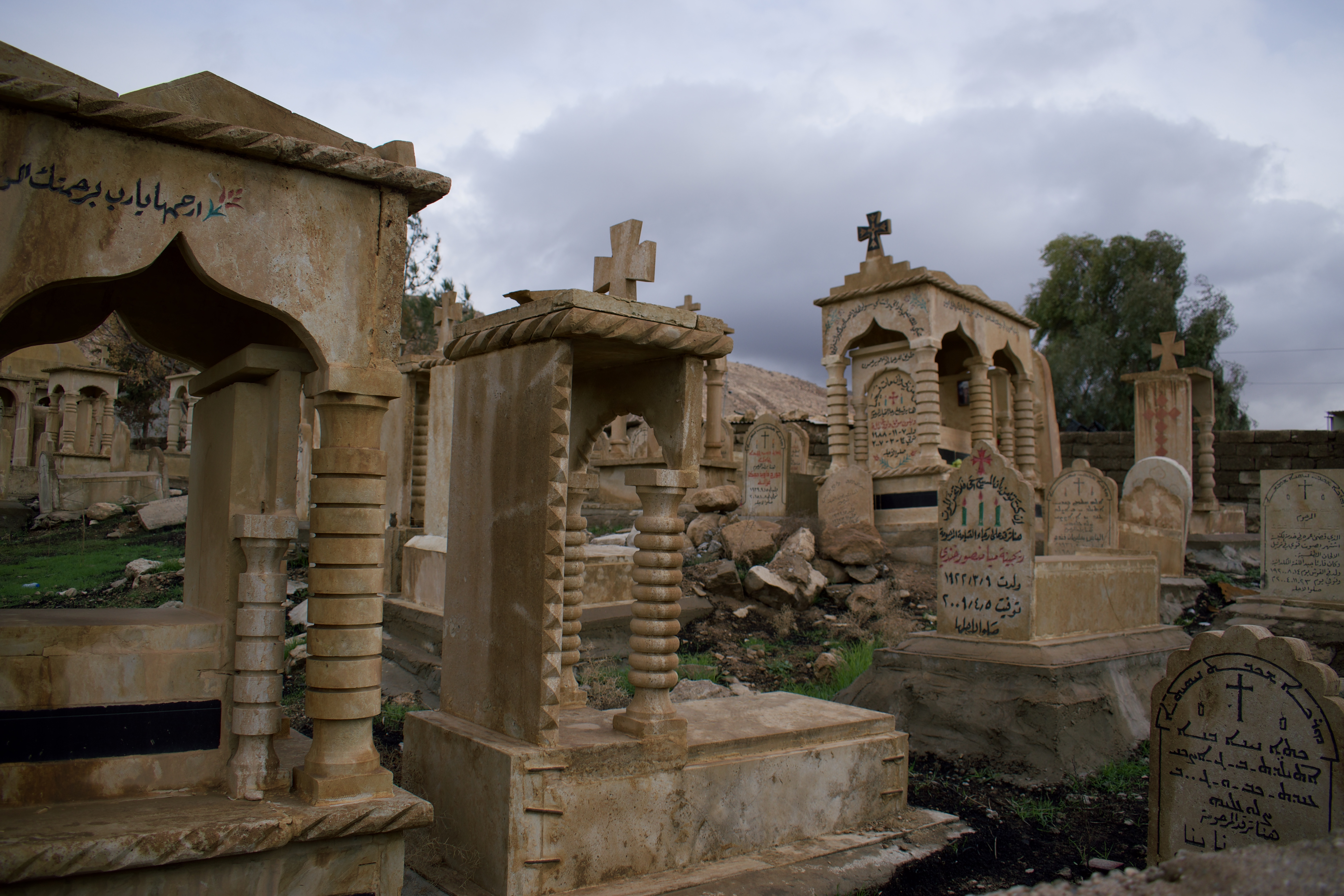
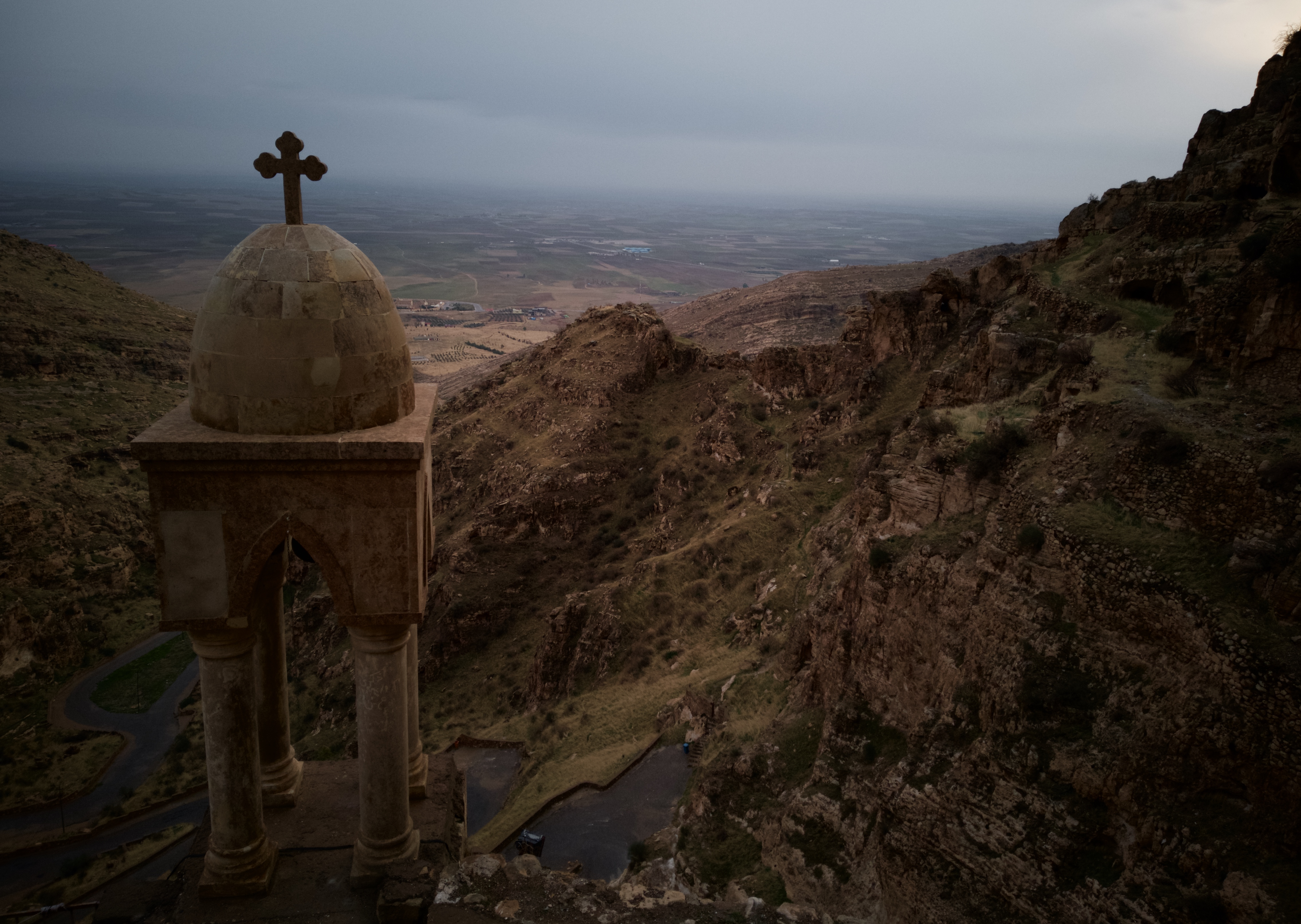
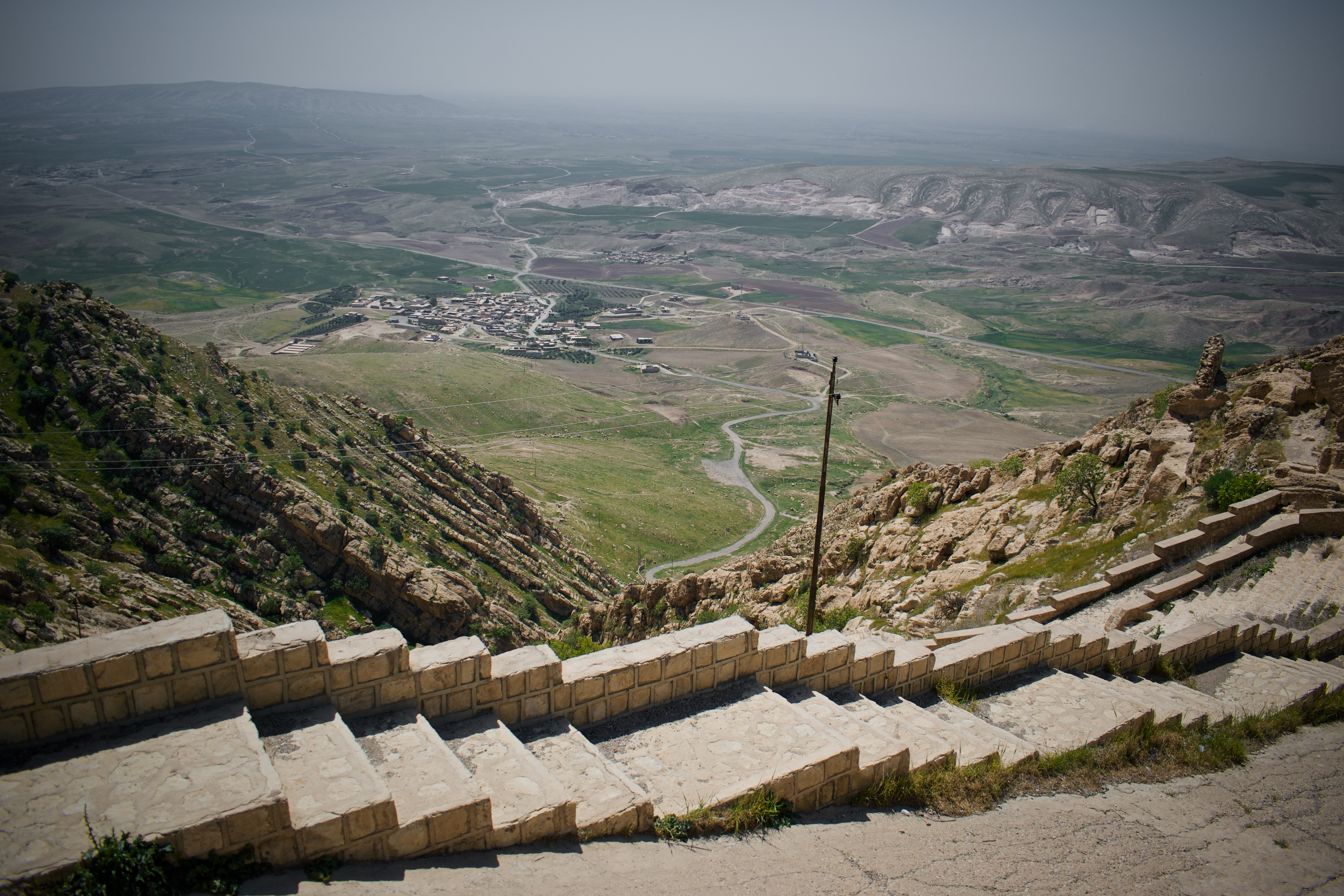
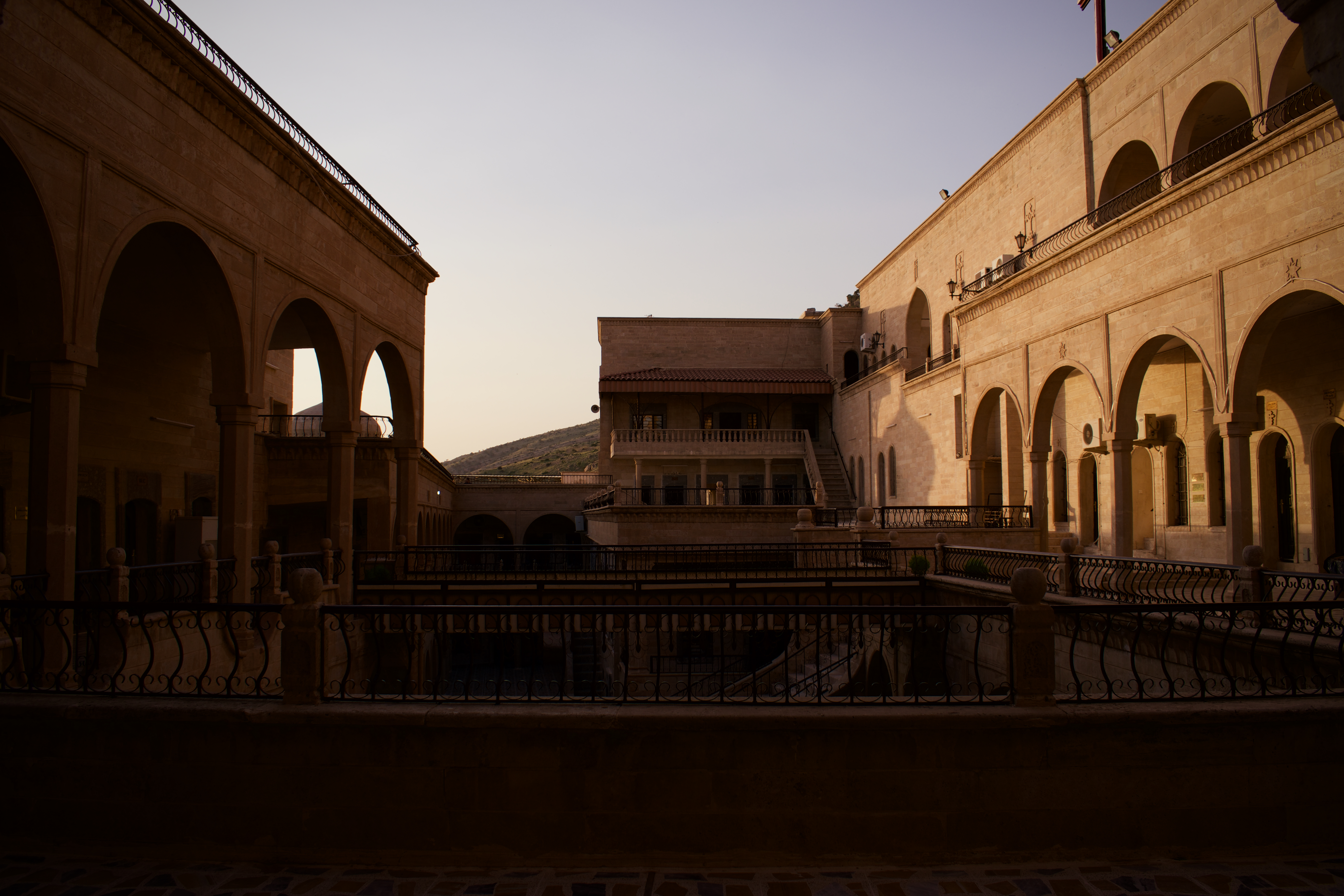
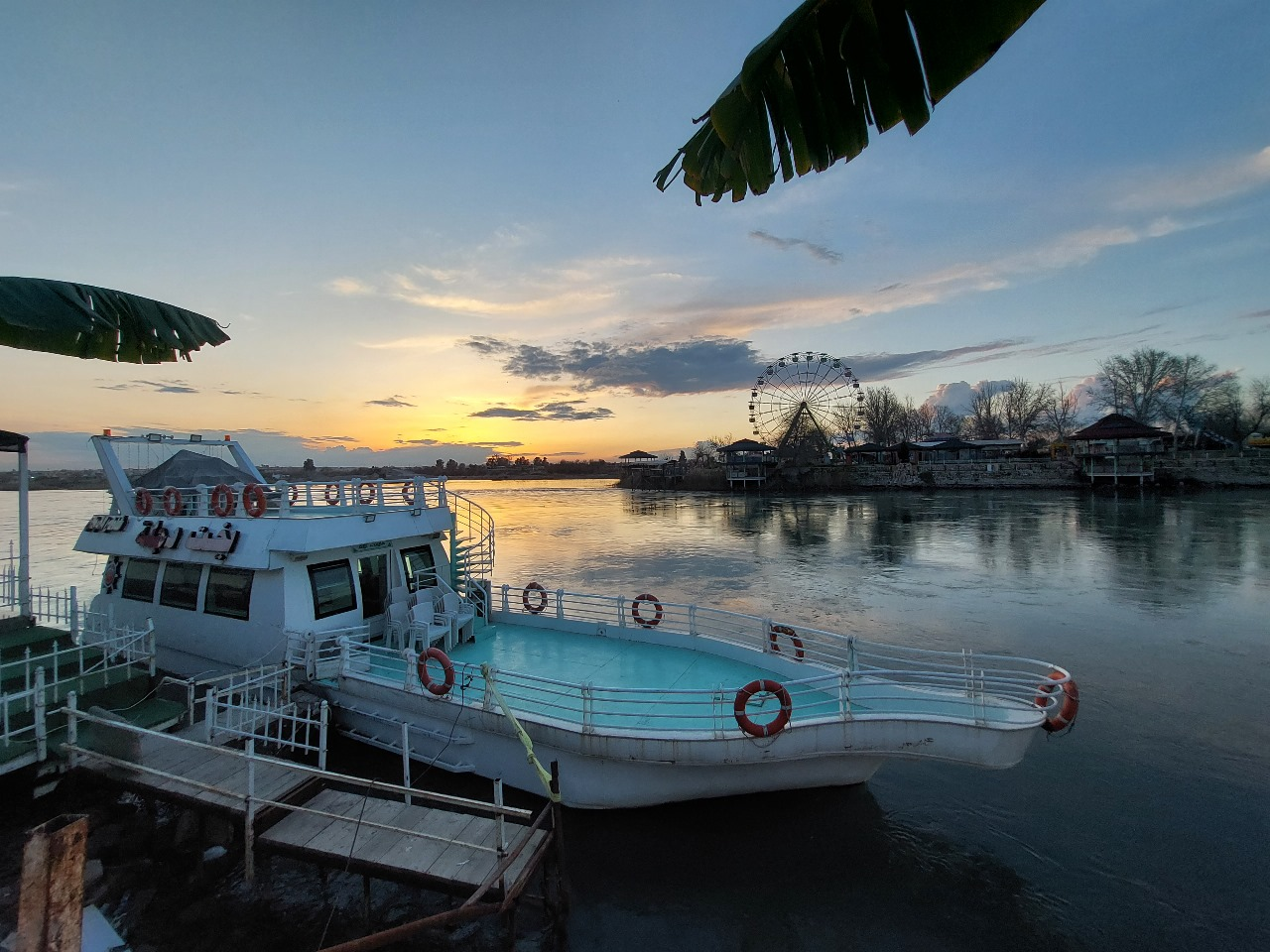
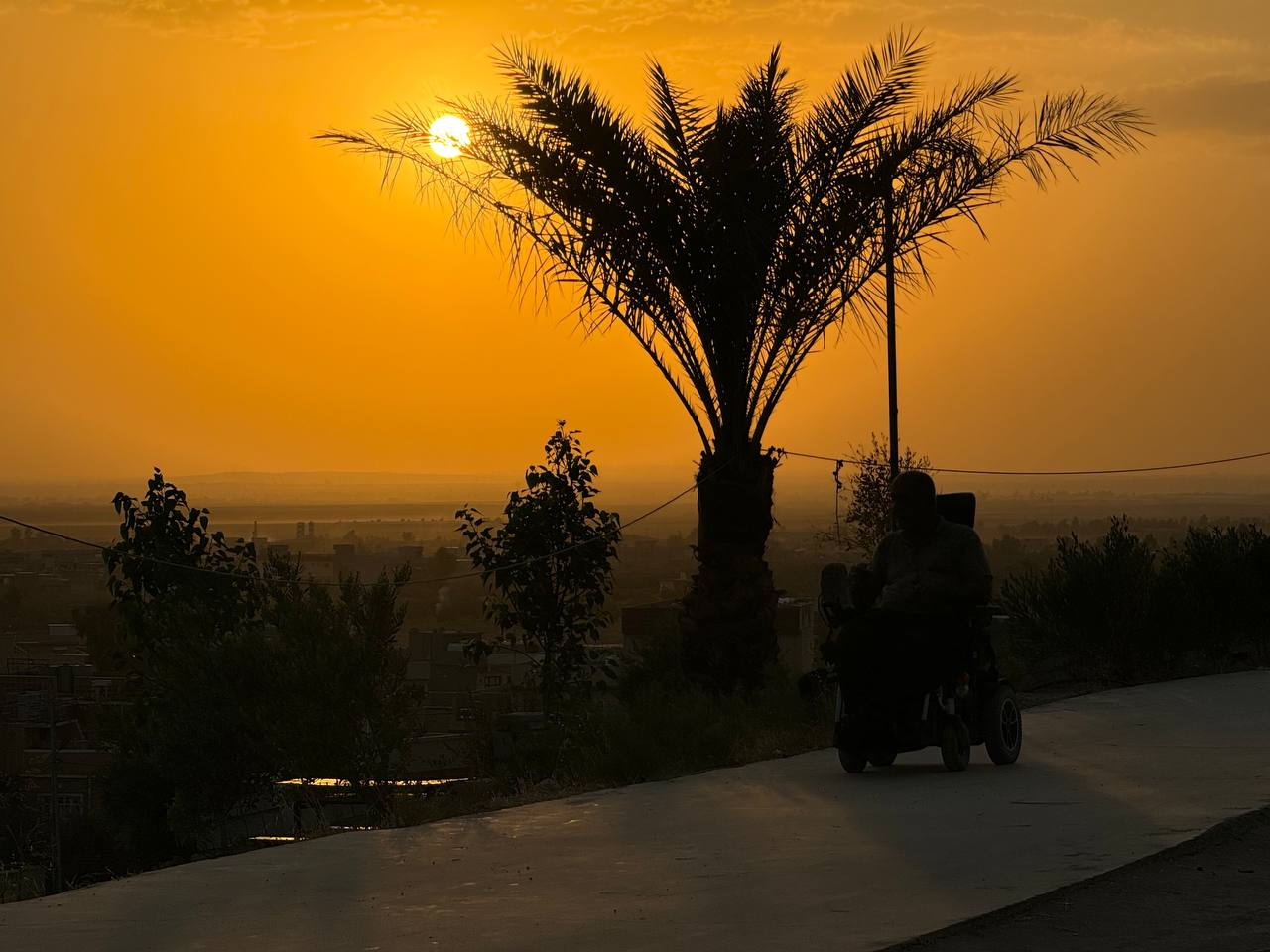

- Map of the three districts which constitute Nineveh plains overlaid over the Nineveh Governorate map.
- Country: Iraq
- Largest city: Bakhdida

Government
  - Governor of Hamdaniya: Nisan Karromi
  - Governor of Tel Keppe: Raad Naser
  - Governor of Al-Shikhan: Hasu Narmu

Area
  - Total: 4,197 km^{2} (1,620 sq mi)

Population
  - Total: 500,000
  - Density: 117/km^{2} (300/sq mi)
  - Census: 281,829

Nineveh Plains (Classical Syriac: ܦܩܥܬܐ ܕܢܝܢܘܐ, romanized: Pqaʿtā ḏ-Nīnwē, Modern Syriac: ܕܫܬܐ ܕܢܝܢܘܐ, romanized: Daštā d-Ninwe; Arabic: سهل نينوى, romanized: Sahl Naynawā; Kurdish: ده‌شتا نه‌ینه‌وا, romanized: Deşta Neynewa) is a region in Nineveh Governorate in Iraq. Located to the north and east of the city Mosul, it is the only Christian-majority region in Iraq and has been a gathering point for Iraqi Christians since 2003. Control over the region is contested between Iraqi security forces, KRG security forces, Assyrian security forces, Babylon Brigade and the Shabak Militia.

The plains have a heterogenous population of Aramaic-speaking Assyrian Christians belonging to different churches: the Assyrian Church of the East, the Chaldean Catholic, the Syriac Orthodox church, and the Syriac Catholic church; as well as Arabs, Kurds, Yazidis, Shabaks and Turkmens. The plains are also rich in the ruins of ancient Assyrian cities and religious sites, such as Nimrud, Dur-Sharrukin, Mar Mattai Monastery, Rabban Hormizd Monastery and the Tomb of Nahum.

== History ==
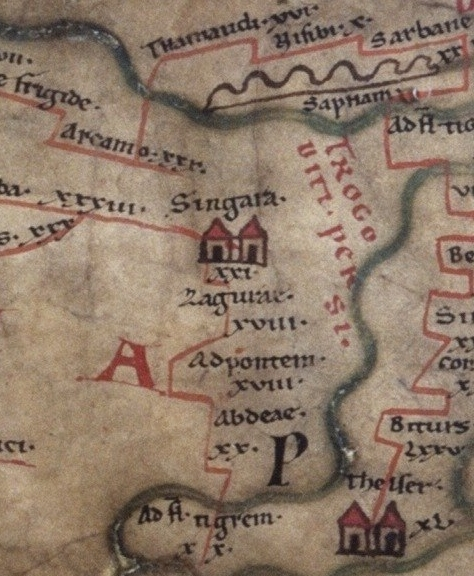
Singara in a detail from Peutinger's map, a medieval copy of a 4th-century Roman original.

A map of the "Jazira"'s provinces in medieval times.

The Middle Bronze Age Kingdom of Andarig used to be located in the north. Peutinger's map of the inhabited world known to the Roman geographers depicts Singara as located west of the Trogoditi. Persi. (Latin: Troglodytae Persiae, "Persian troglodytes") who inhabited the territory around Mount Sinjar. By the medieval Arabs, most of the plain was reckoned as part of the province of Diyār Rabīʿa, the "abode of the Rabīʿa" tribe. The plain was the site of the determination of the degree by al-Khwārizmī and other astronomers during the reign of the caliph al-Mamun. Sinjar also boasted a famous Church of the East cathedral in the 8th century.

=== Attacks on Christians ===
Following the concerted attacks on Assyrians in Iraq, especially highlighted by the Sunday, August 1, 2004 simultaneous bombing of six Churches (Baghdad and Mosul) and subsequent bombing of nearly thirty other churches throughout the country, Assyrian leadership, internally and externally, began to regard the Nineveh Plain as the location where security for Christians may be possible. Schools especially received much attention in this area and in Kurdish areas where Assyrian concentrated population lives. In addition, agriculture and medical clinics received financial help from the Assyrian diaspora.

As attacks on Christians increased in Basra, Baghdad, Ramadi and smaller towns. more families turned northward to the extended family holdings in the Nineveh Plain. This place of refuge remains underfunded and gravely lacking in infrastructure to aid the ever-increasing internally displaced people population.

In February 2010, the attacks against Assyrians in Mosul forced 4,300 Assyrians to flee to the Nineveh plains where there is an Assyrian-majority population. From 2012, it also began receiving influxes of Assyrians from Syria owing to the civil war there.

In August 2014 nearly all of the non-Sunni inhabitants of the southern regions of the Plains were driven out by the Islamic State of Iraq and the Levant during the 2014 Northern Iraq offensive.

=== Creation of an autonomous province ===
The Assyrian inhabited towns and villages on the Nineveh Plain form a concentration of those belonging to Syriac Christian traditions, and since this area is the ancient home of the Assyrian empire through which the people trace their cultural heritage, the Nineveh Plain is the area on which an effort to form and has become concentrated. There have been calls by some politicians inside and outside Iraq to create an autonomous region for Assyrians in this area.

In the Transitional Administrative Law adopted in March 2004 in Baghdad, not only were provisions made for the preservation of Assyrian culture through education and media, but a provision for an administrative unit also was accepted. Article 125 in Iraq's Constitution states that: "This Constitution shall guarantee the administrative, political, cultural, and educational rights of the various nationalities, such as Turkomen, Chaldeans, Assyrians, and all other constituents, and this shall be regulated by law." Since the towns and villages on the Nineveh Plain form a concentration of those belonging to Syriac Christian traditions, and since this area is the ancient home of the Assyrian empire through which these people trace their cultural heritage, the Nineveh Plain is the area on which the effort to form an autonomous Assyrian entity have become concentrated. The same article has been used to proclaim an autonomous province for the Yezidi people.

On January 21, 2014, the Iraqi government had declared that Nineveh Plains would become a new province, which would serve as a safe haven for Assyrians.

After the liberation of the Nineveh Plain from ISIL between 2016/17, all Assyrian political parties called on the European Union and UN Security Council for the creation of an Assyrian self-administered province in the Nineveh Plain.

Between the 28th–30 June 2017, a conference was held in Brussels dubbed The Future for Christians in Iraq. The conference was organised by the European People's Party and had participants extending from Assyrian/Chaldean/Syriac organizations, including representatives from the Federal Iraqi Government and Kurdistan Region. The conference was boycotted by the Assyrian Democratic Movement, Sons of Mesopotamia, Assyrian Patriotic Party, Chaldean Catholic Church and Assyrian Church of the East. A position paper was signed by the remaining political organizations involved.

A 2019 testimony from Assyrian activist Reine Hanna at the United States Commission on International Religious Freedom claimed that the rate of Assyrian return in towns guarded by the Nineveh Plain Protection Units was significantly higher than those controlled by other forces following the end of the Islamic State's occupation of the Nineveh Plain. The NPU guarded Assyrian town of Bakhdida, for example, saw a 70% return of the town’s original Assyrian population (about 35,000 Assyrians). In Tesqopa, which is controlled by KRG Peshmerga, the rate of return is about 20% of the original Assyrian population. In Tel Keppe, which is controlled by PMF Brigade 50, the return rate of the original Assyrian population is about 7%.

== Geography ==
Nineveh Plains lie to the east, northeast of the city of Mosul in the Iraqi Nineveh Governorate, plus between Semi-arid climate and Mediterranean climate. The ancient city of Nineveh stood where the eastern outskirts of Mosul are today, on the bank of the Tigris river. The Nineveh Plains is the only region in Iraq where a plurality of inhabitants follow Syriac Christianity. Before ISIL invaded Nineveh, Assyrians made up around 40% of the population within the plains.

== Population ==
The Nineveh Plains are not only the historical homeland of the Assyrian people and a crucible of pre-Arab, pre-Kurdish, pre-Islam Mesopotamian civilisation, and it is a region where a majority of the population is currently drawn from the minorities.

=== Churches ===
In 2019 and 2020 the Christians of the Nineveh Plains belonged to the following Eastern churches:

- Syriac Catholic Church (51.8%)
- Syriac Orthodox Church (31.9%)
- Chaldean Catholic Church (15.7%)
- Ancient Church of the East (0.3%)
- Assyrian Church of the East (0.1%)
- Melkite Greek Catholic Church (0.1%)

== Economy ==
Old farming methods in Alqosh.

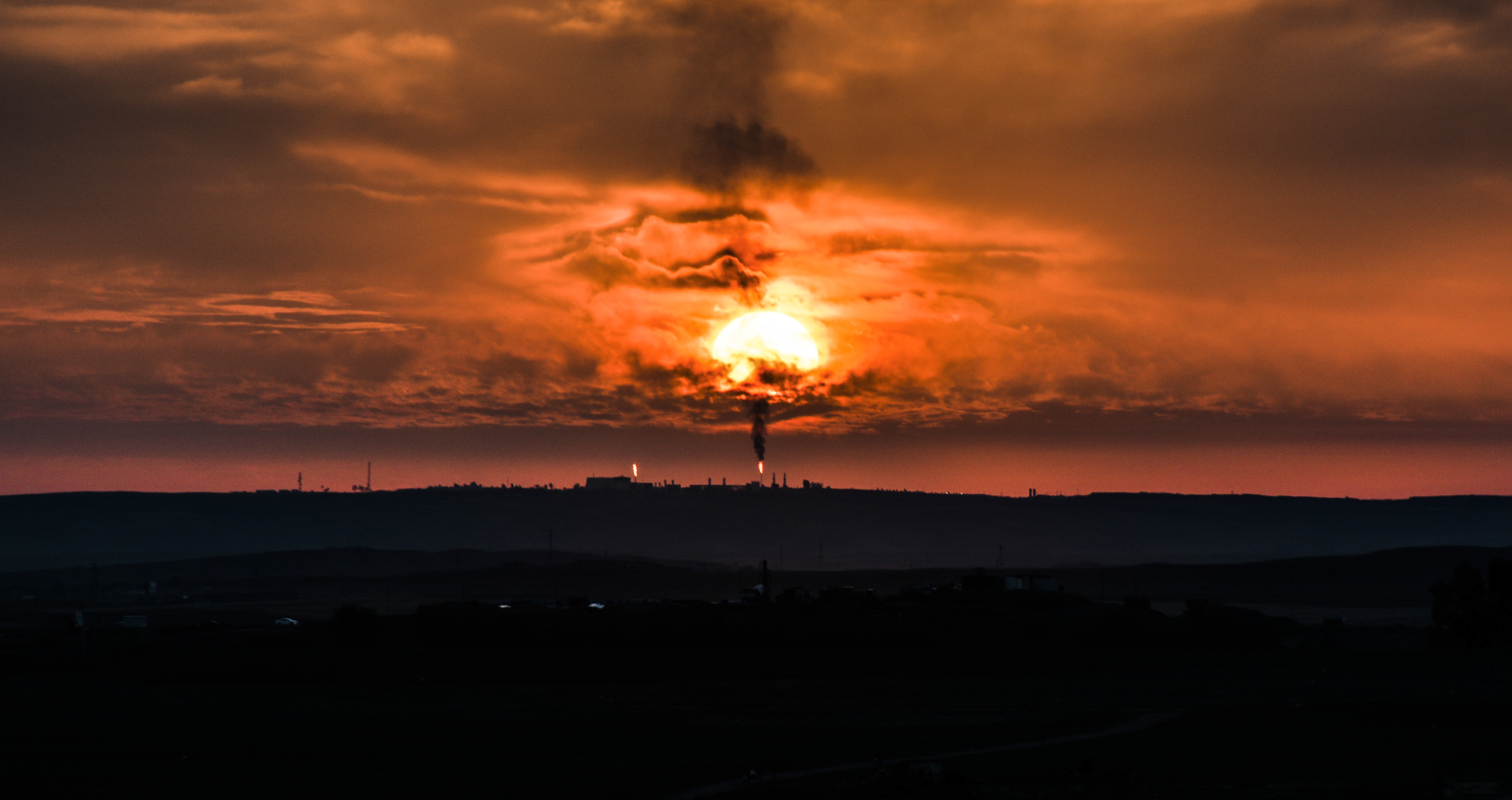
An oil refinery and a petrochemical complex in northern Iraq

The Nineveh Plain appears to hold under its rich agricultural lands an extension of the petroleum fields tapped in 2006 by the Kurdistan Region in direct contract with foreign oil exploration companies. It is believed that this added incentive for absorption by the KRG of the region may lead to economic conflict with Sunni Arab tribes in the Mosul region itself. Assyrians claim that without Nineveh Plain autonomous administration, the indigenous Assyrian presence in its ancient homeland could well disappear. There are some oil reserves in Nineveh Plains. The amount of crude oil in the Nineveh Plains stretching from Shekhan to Alqosh is 25 billion barrels which is worth $10 trillion.

Most of the inhabitants have practiced dry agriculture since ancient times and rely on the fertile plains to the south, growing agricultural products like grain, wheat, beans and in the summer goods such as cantaloupe and cucumber. Farmers followed old non-technological methods in their farming for several centuries, and their livelihood was always threatened due to natural disasters such as droughts or plant epidemics such as grasshoppers. Besides farmlands, other agriculture also occurs in grape vineyards. Grapevines spread all over the village and produce various types of grapes, among which are the black grapes that are well known in northern Iraq.

Modern agricultural machinery such as tractors, harvester-threshers (reapers), along with new methods of treating and curing plant epidemics now exist. However, irrigation is still a problem in the area, and farming still relies on rainfall. Currently, dozen of farms now belong to the government and are deputized to their owners to use them, as most were taken during Saddam Hussein's control. The Assyrian settlement of Alqosh enjoyed being an important trade center for the various Kurdish, Yazidi, and Arab villages in the region and it houses a large market that receiving agricultural and animal products from across the region.

== See also ==
- Assyrians in Iraq
- Assyrian independence movement
- Assyrian homeland
- Proposals for Assyrian autonomy in Iraq
- Barwari
- Nahla plains
- Urmia Plain
- Disputed territories of Northern Iraq
