= Christianity in Iraq =

Languages
- Assyrian, Armenian, Kurdish, Arabic

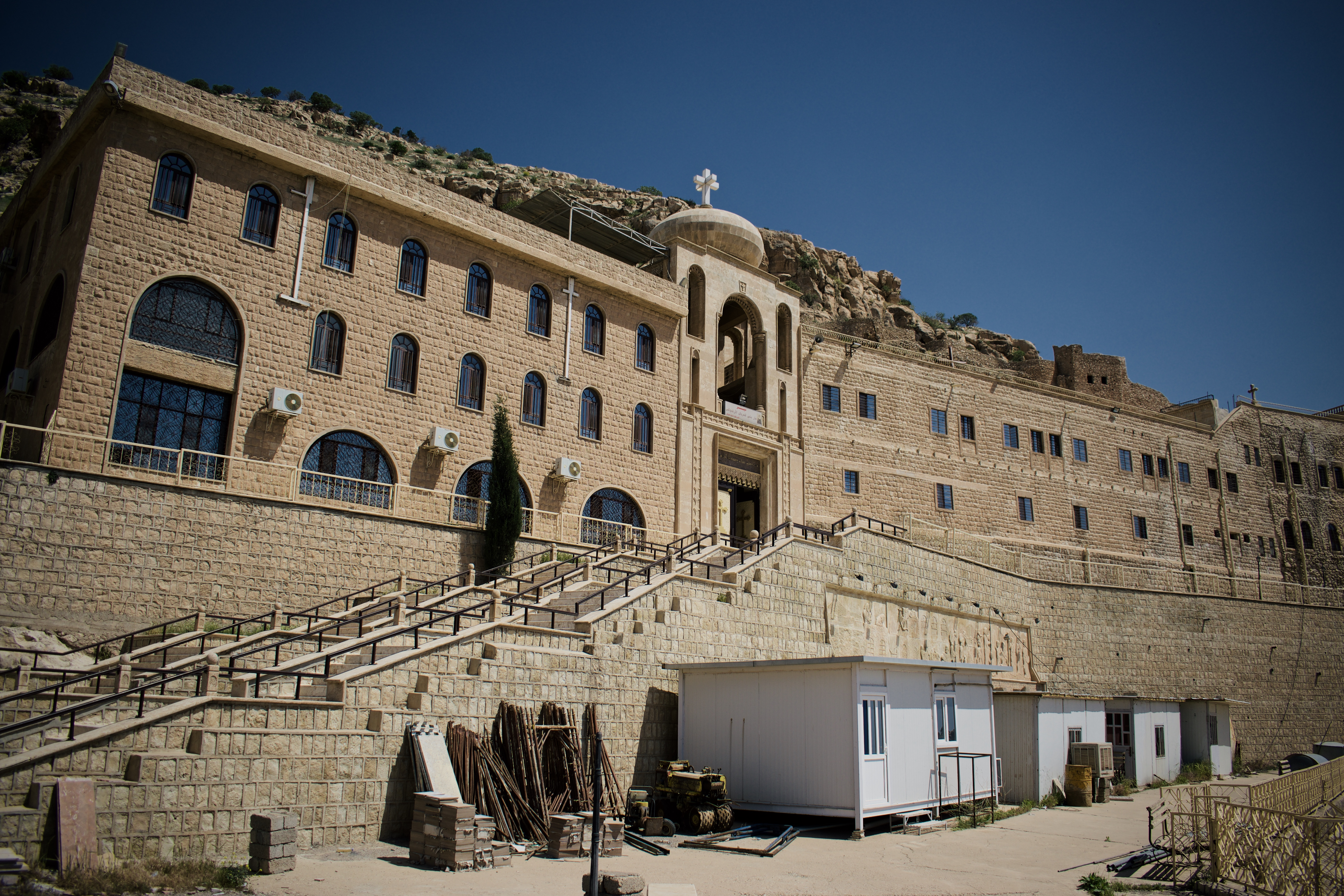
Assyrian church Mar Mattai Monastery, the Saint Matthew Monastery, Iraq ( ܕܝܪܐ ܕܡܪܝ ܡܬܝ)

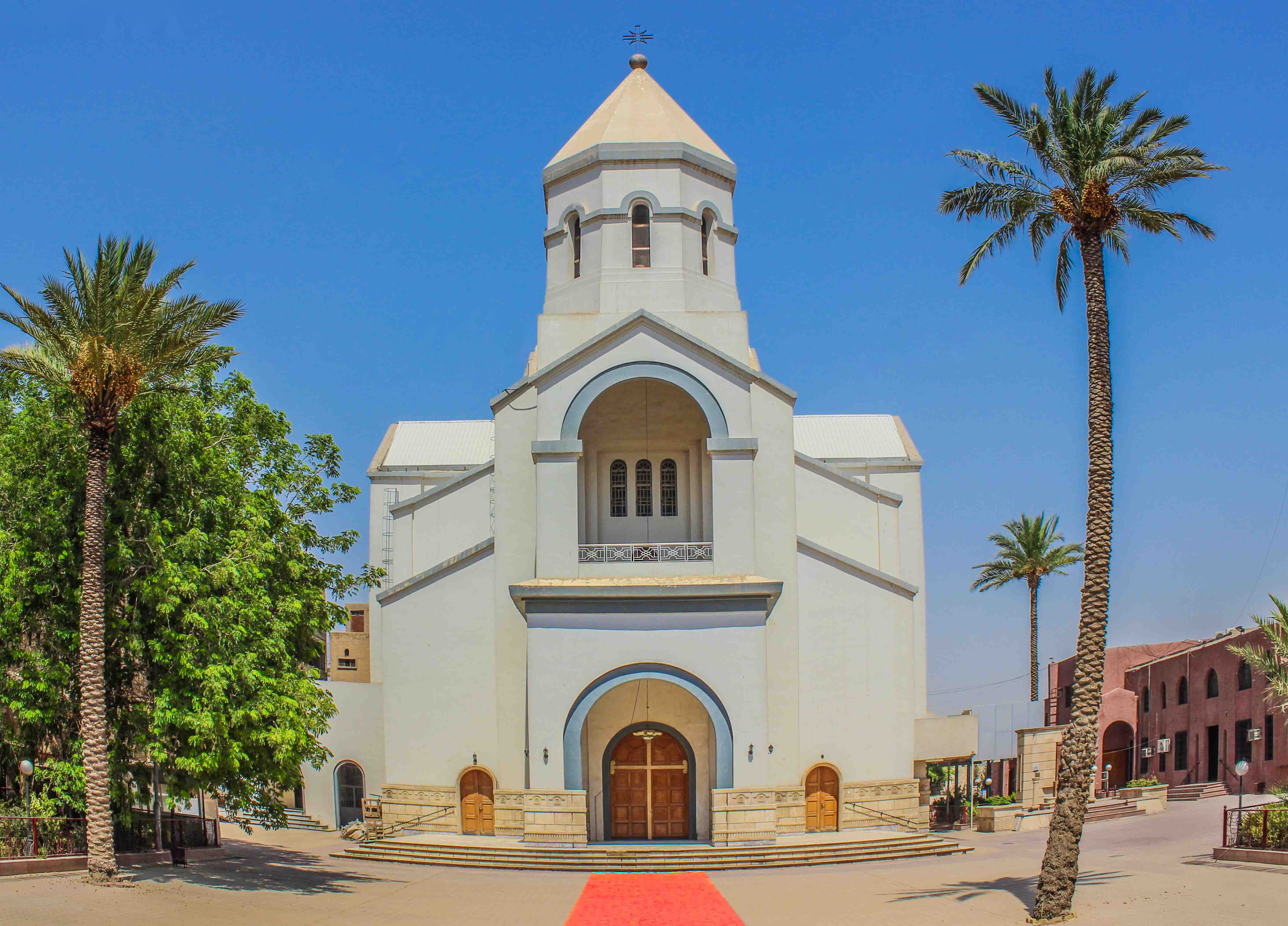
The Armenian Church of Baghdad, Iraq

Christians in Iraq are one of the oldest, continuous and significant Christian communities. The vast majority of Iraqi Christians are indigenous Assyrians who descend from the ancient Assyria, followed by Armenians then the later Arabs, and a very small minority of Kurdish, Shabaks and Iraqi Turkmen Christians. Christians in Iraq primarily adhere to the Syriac Christian tradition and rites and speak Northeastern Neo-Aramaic dialects, although Turoyo is also present on a smaller scale. Some are also known by the name of their religious denomination as well as their ethnic identity, such as Chaldean Catholics, Chaldo-Assyrians, or Syriacs. Regardless of religious affiliation (Chaldean Catholic Church, Assyrian Church of the East, Syriac Orthodox Church, Syriac Catholic Church, Assyrian Pentecostal Church, etc.) Assyrians Christians in Iraq and surrounding countries are one homogeneous people and separate to other groups in the country, with a distinct history of their own harking back to ancient Assyria.

Christians have inhabited modern-day Iraq for about 2,000 years, tracing their ancestry to ancient Mesopotamia and surrounding lands. The great patriarch Abraham came from Ur (modern-day Nasiriyah), while Isaac's wife Rebecca came from Assyria (in modern-day northwestern Iraq.) Additionally, Daniel lived in Iraq most of his life and the prophet Ezekiel was from southern Iraq and his shrine is located there. Shrines of the prophet Jonah and Saint George are also located there, and a number of other biblical prophets and saints are said to have been from there as well. Adam and Eve are also widely thought to have hailed from Iraq, as the biblical Garden of Eden is often said to have been located in southern Iraq. Syriac Christianity was first established in Mesopotamia, and certain subsets of that tradition (namely the Church of the East and its successor churches) were established in northern and central-southern Iraq. This would become one of the most popular Christian churches in the Middle East and Fertile Crescent and would spread as far east as India and China.

Prior to the Gulf War in 1991, Christians numbered one million in Iraq. This may be an underestimate by half as seen in the 1987 census numbers. Saddam Hussein kept anti-Christian violence under control but Christians were sometimes subjected to "relocation programmes". The predominantly ethnically and linguistically distinct Assyrians were pressured to identify as Arabs. The Christian population fell to an estimated 800,000 during the Iraq War. During the 2013–2017 Iraq War with ISIS rapidly sweeping through western lands, Christian fled as they feared the persecution by the militants, as they were to "execute" any person who did not believe in their Sunni sect. Thousands of Christians fled to Baghdad, where they found refuge and adequate housing, some of whom have chosen to make Baghdad their new permanent home following the full defeat of ISIS in Iraq. Thousands have also fled to other parts of southern Iraq, such as the Shia-majority city of Najaf which housed thousands of Christians in holy Islamic shrines once they fled from ISIS. A large population have also returned to their homes en masse following the defeat of ISIS and were able to celebrate Christian festivals in safety with the protection of the Nineveh Plain Protection Units and its allies. At the same time, the current status of Iraqi Christians is split between the protection of Baghdad and Erbil, in light of their domestic competition. The current number of Assyrians is said to be less than 140,000 in 2024, according to the non-profit Shlama Foundation. Based on broader religious identification, the number of Christians is likely only slightly larger.

Christians in Iraq have been well-integrated and have contributed greatly to Iraq, popularly as scholars, researchers, academics, and economists. Iraqi Christians have also hold high positions in the government, such as Thabit AbdulNour and Tariq Aziz. There is a large population that are entertainers, artists, actresses and singers.

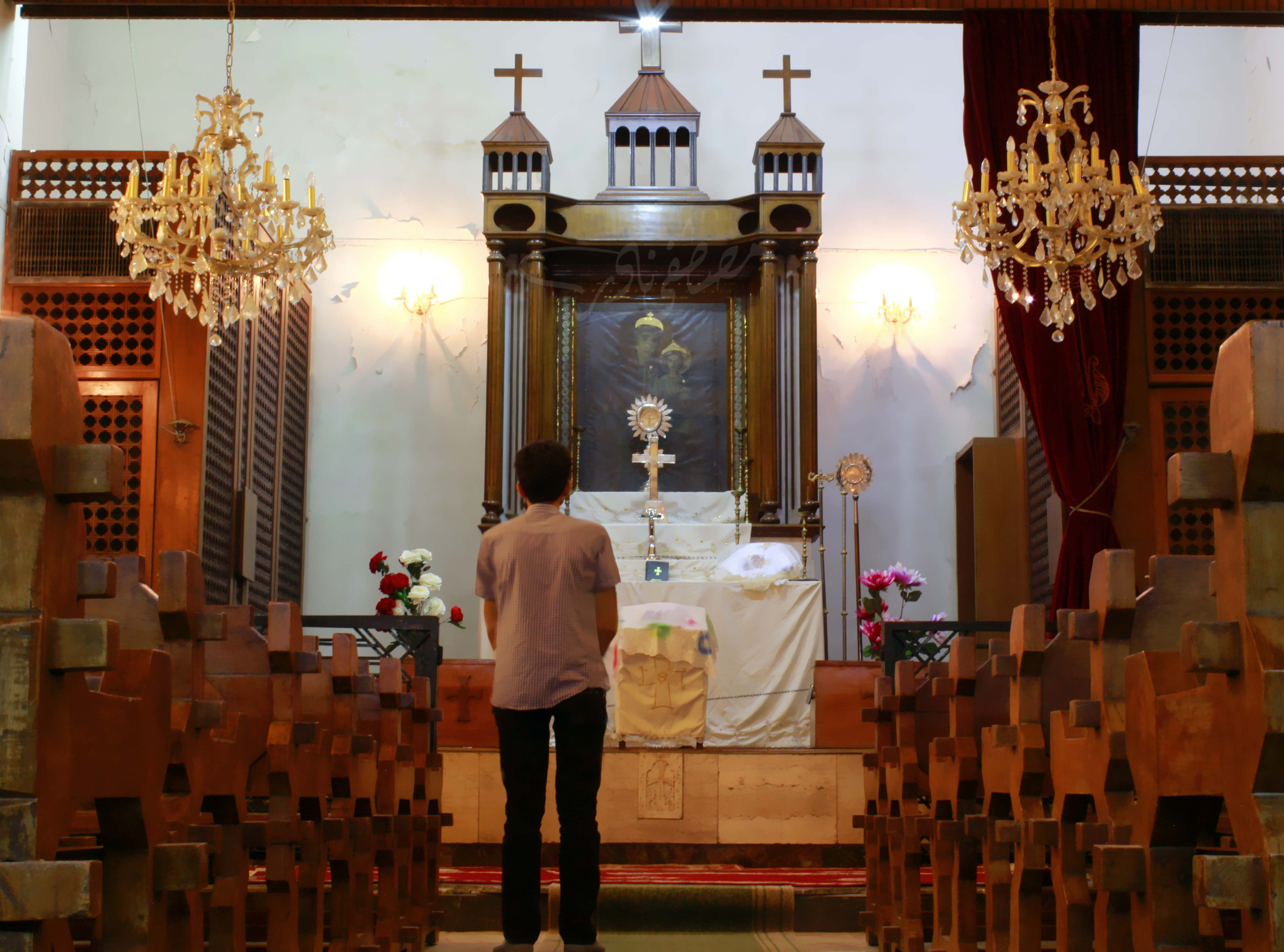
Armenian Orthodox Church, Baghdad

== History ==
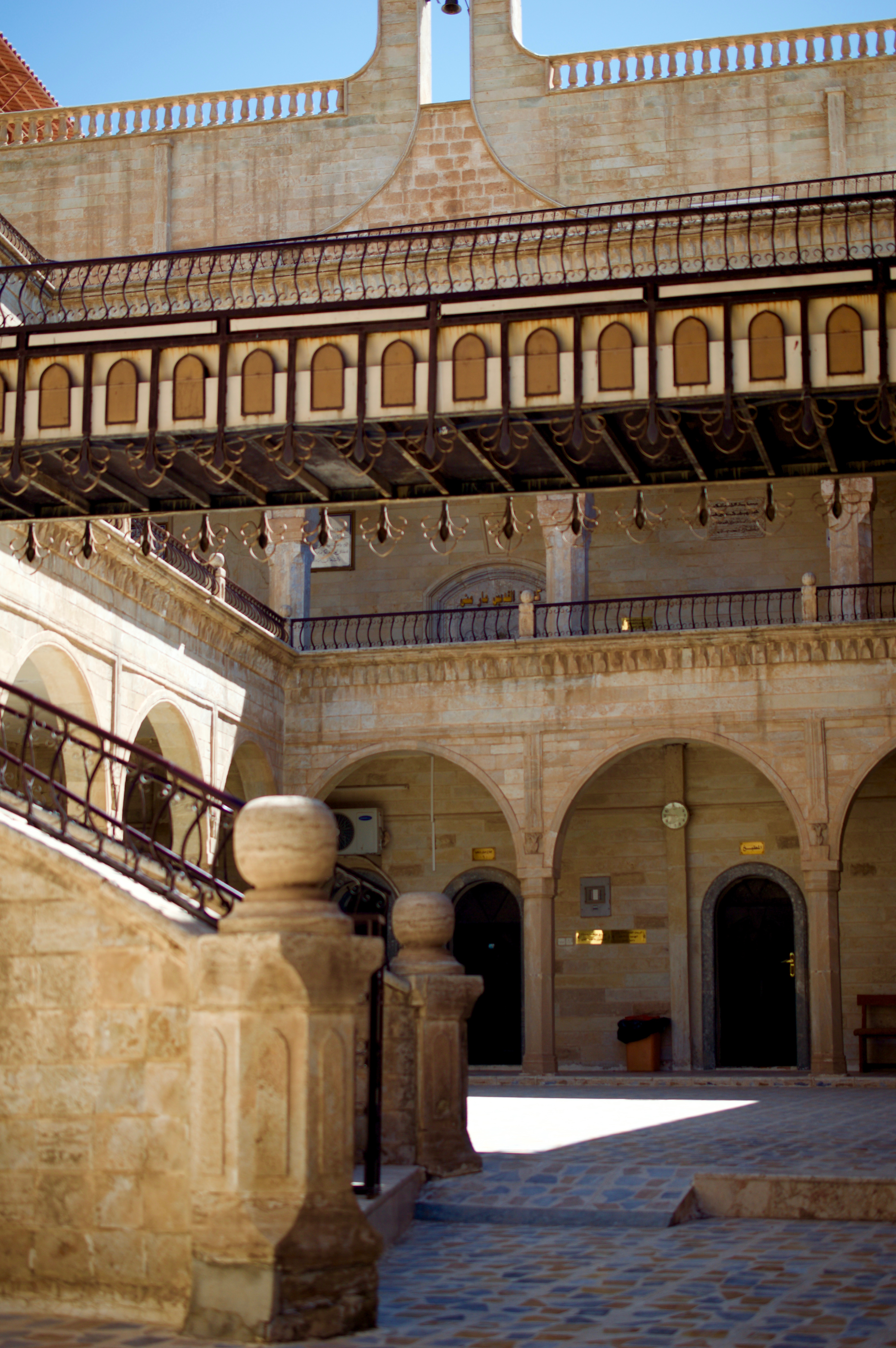
Mar Mattai Monastery, the Saint Matthew Monastery near Mosul, Iraq (دير مار متى ܕܝܪܐ ܕܡܪܝ ܡܬܝ)

Christianity in Iraq has its roots in the conception of the Church of the East in the 5th century AD, predating the existence of Islam in the region of Iraq. Iraqi Christians are predominantly native Assyrians belonging to the Ancient Church of the East, Assyrian Church of the East, Assyrian Pentecostal Church, Assyrian Evangelical Church, Mar Thoma Church, Chaldean Catholic Church, Syriac Catholic Church and Syriac Orthodox Church. In Iraq, there is also a significant population of Armenian Christians whose ancestors had fled from Turkey during the Armenian genocide. The Christian population increased from 550,000 in 1947 (12% of the population of 4.6 million) to 1.4 million in 1987 (8% of the estimated population of 16.3 million). After the 2003 invasion of Iraq, violence against Christians increased, with reports of abduction, torture, bombings, and killings. The Iraq War (2003-2011) displaced much of the remaining Christian community from their homeland as a result of ethnic and religious persecution at the hands of Islamic extremists.

=== Early Church ===
Christianity was brought to Iraq in the 1st century by Thomas the Apostle and Mar Addai (Addai of Edessa) and his pupils Aggai and Mari. Thomas was one of the Twelve Apostles while, according to tradition, Addai was one of the first 70 disciples. Iraq's Eastern Aramaic-speaking Assyrian communities are believed to be among the oldest in the world.

The Assyrian people adopted Christianity in the 1st century and modern-day northern Iraq became the centre of Eastern Rite Christianity and Syriac literature from the 1st century until the Middle Ages. Among the Assyrians, Christianity initially co-existed with the ancient Mesopotamian religion until the latter began to decline in the 4th century.

In the early centuries after the Arab Islamic conquest of the 7th century, Assyria (also known as Athura and Asoristan) was dissolved by the Arabs as a geopolitical entity. However, the indigenous Assyrians (known as Ashuriyun by the Arabs) continued to play an influential role in Iraq as scholars and doctors.

=== Rise of Islam ===
According to Hirmis Aboona in the period prior to the establishment of Abbasid rule in 750 AD, pastoral Kurds moved into upper Mesopotamia from Persian Azerbaijan, taking advantage of an unstable situation. Cities in northern and northeastern Assyria were raided and attacked by the Kurds of Persian Azerbaijan, "who killed, looted, and enslaved the indigenous population", and the Kurds were moving into several areas in eastern Assyria. The chronicler Ibn Hawqal spoke about the state to which the region of Shahrazoor had been reduced, describing it as a “town, which was overpowered by the Kurds, and whose environs as far as Iraq had been enjoying prosperity”. Another contemporary source described the region of Adiabene thus: "...the plain of Hadyab was entirely inhabited by the Nestorians but the Kurds have occupied it and depopulated it of its inhabitants".

Later, the Seljuks invaded Mesopotamia with the support of Kurdish chieftains and tribes. They "destroyed whatever they encountered" and captured and enslaved women. The historian Ibn Khaldun wrote that the Kurds "spoiled and spread horror everywhere". In time, the demographic change led to Assyria and much of Greater Armenia effectively becoming Kurdistan.

The Assyrian Church of the East has its origin in what is now southeastern Turkey and Asoristan (Sasanian Assyria). By the end of the 13th century, there were twelve Nestorian dioceses in a strip from Beijing to Samarkand. Northern Iraq remained predominantly Assyrian, Eastern Aramaic-speaking and Christian until the destructions of the 14th-century Muslim warlord of Turco-Mongol descent, Timur (Tamerlane), who conquered Persia, Mesopotamia and Syria. The civilian population was decimated, and the ancient city of Assur was finally abandoned by the Assyrians after a 4000-year history. Timur had 70,000 Christian Assyrians beheaded in Tikrit and 90,000 more in Baghdad. Timur rewarded the Kurds for their support by "settling them in the devastated regions, which until then had been inhabited by the followers of the Church of the East."

=== Ottoman rule ===
In the 16th century, the Ottomans reinforced their eastern frontier with what they considered loyal Sunni Kurd tribes. They settled Kurdish tribes in these regions and in 1583, Sultan Murad III "gave huge provinces to the Kurdish tribe of Mokri". According to Aboona, "many regions with numerous Assyrian and Armenian monuments and monasteries became completely populated by the Kurds after Chaldiran," and Kurdish historians wrote that "the land was cleared at this time, its indigenous inhabitants driven out by force". The Kurdish historian Ali al Qurani affirmed that Sarsing had "been an Assyrian town and that the Kurds who settled there were immigrants from Persian Azerbaijan." Phebe Marr noted that "in the north too, many of the Kurdish tribes of Persia migrated to Iraq". British traveler James Rich observed in northern Iraq the "rapid influx of Kurds from Persia... and that their advance never ceased". He noted that "some ten thousand families, comprising seventy thousand souls, were constantly moving across the border". Southgate also observed the "rapid advance and settlement of the Kurds from Persia into northern Iraq" around that time. Dr. Grant shared an eyewitness account, stating: "Beth Garrnae (the region of Arbil-Kirkuk) once contained a large population of Nestorian Christians, they are now reduced to a few scattered villages... Within the last six years the Koords of Ravandoos and Amadia have successively swept over it.." In the 17th century, a new epoch began when Emir Afrasiyab of Basra allowed the Portuguese to build a church outside of the city of Basra.

During World War I, the Assyrians of northern Iraq, southeastern Turkey, northeastern Syria and northwestern Iran suffered the Assyrian genocide, which accounted for the deaths of up to 65% of the entire Assyrian population.

=== Assyrian genocide and post-World War era ===
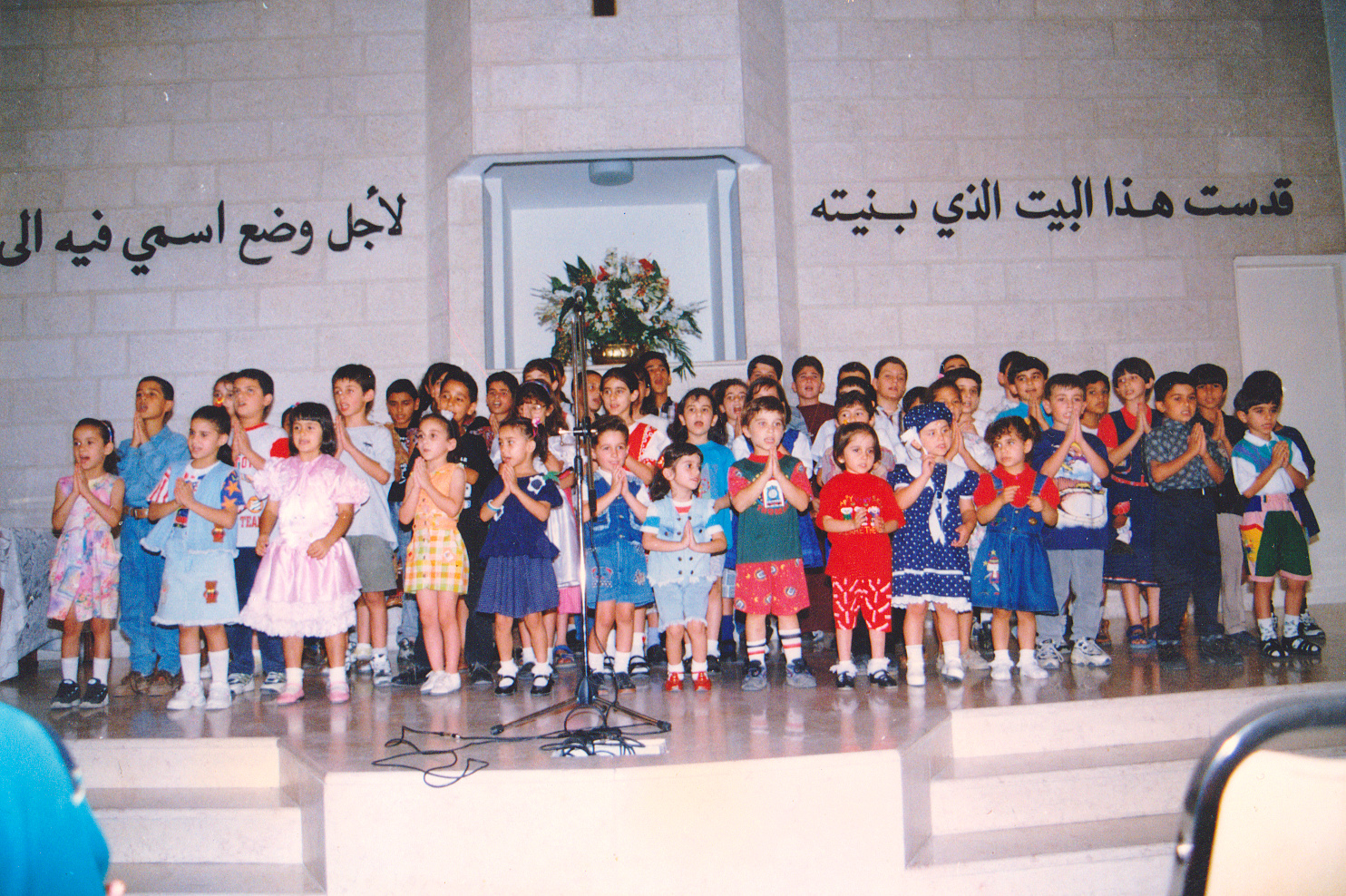
A group of Iraqi Christian children in northern Iraq

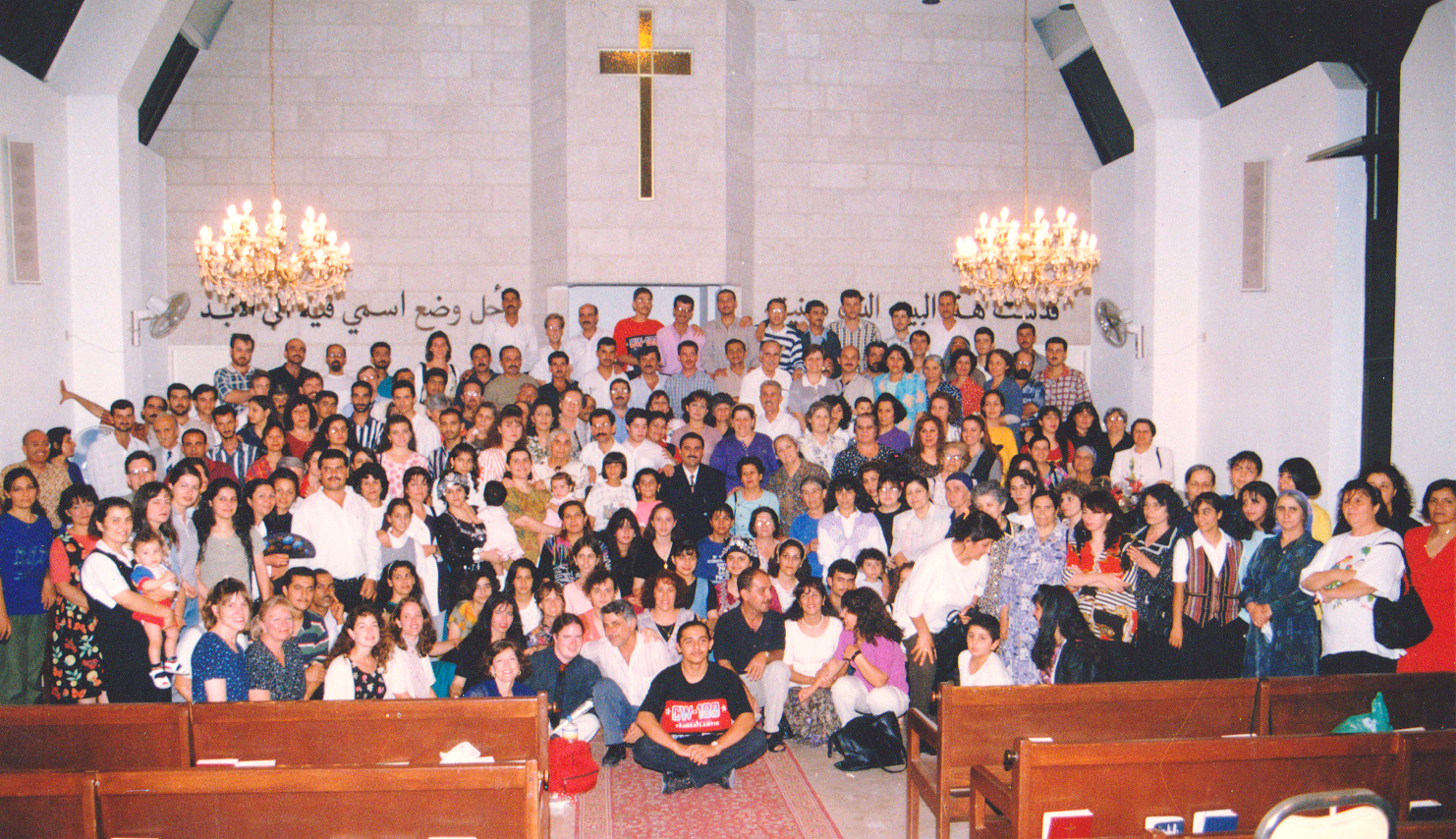
Iraqi Christians at a church in Amman, Jordan, in 1999

In the early 1930s, the Iraqi Arab ministries disseminated leaflets among the Kurds calling them to join the Arabs in massacring Assyrians. This call appealed to Islamic convictions and united Arabs and Kurds against the "infidel" Christians. Just before the Simele massacre of August 11, 1933, Kurds began a campaign of looting against Assyrian settlements. The Assyrians fled to Simele, where they were also persecuted. Just after Iraq formally gained independence in 1933, the Iraqi military led by Kurdish general Bakr Sidqi carried out large-scale massacres against the Assyrians in the city of Simele which had beforehand supported the British colonial administration. According to some studies, many eyewitness accounts attested of the many atrocities that Arabs and Kurds perpetrated against Assyrian women.

Until the 1950s, the Nineveh Plains (also known as Mosul Plains) had always been the cultural heartland for Chaldeans. Many Christians moved to the southwards after 1933. In 1832, 70% of Christians lived in and around Mosul. By 1957 only 47 per cent remained there. In 1958, the Kingdom of Iraq was toppled by a group of army officers led by Abdul Karim Qasim. Iraqi Christians supported Qasim. However, the population of Christians in the region reduced further during the 1963 coup, as many pro-Qasim and pro-Communist Christians fled Ba'ath reprisals. By 1979, half of Iraqi Christians lived in Baghdad, comprising 14% of the city's population.

Under the Ba'ath Party rule, Christians prospered. However, dispute regarding the ethnic identity of Christians, who have predominantly identified as Assyrian. In 1972, the government recognized the cultural rights of Assyrians, by allowing them to use Syriac language in media, education, and communications. However, this decree was not enforced. To consolidate power, the government launched a crackdown on minorities including Christians. According to several reports, Christians were forced to register themselves as either Arab or Kurd. However, according to many, government protection allowed Assyrian Christians to preserve their language and culture as they were not in a sensitive political arena.

Christians were tolerated under the secular regime of Saddam Hussein. Being a highly educated community, Christians were useful as effective administrators, civil officers, and bureaucrats. Saddam made one of them, Tariq Aziz, his deputy and foreign minister. Aziz was known as one of the most pioneering diplomats in the history or Iraq. Churches and cathedrals were protected by the government. Aside from Aziz, some well-known Christians in the military were Georges Sada, Kamel Hana Gegeo, and Malko Hana. Christians were also offered positions in security, presidential, and mayoral sectors of the government. The 1987 Iraqi census counted 1.4 million Christians.

=== Iraq War, 2008–2017 instability and ISIS ===
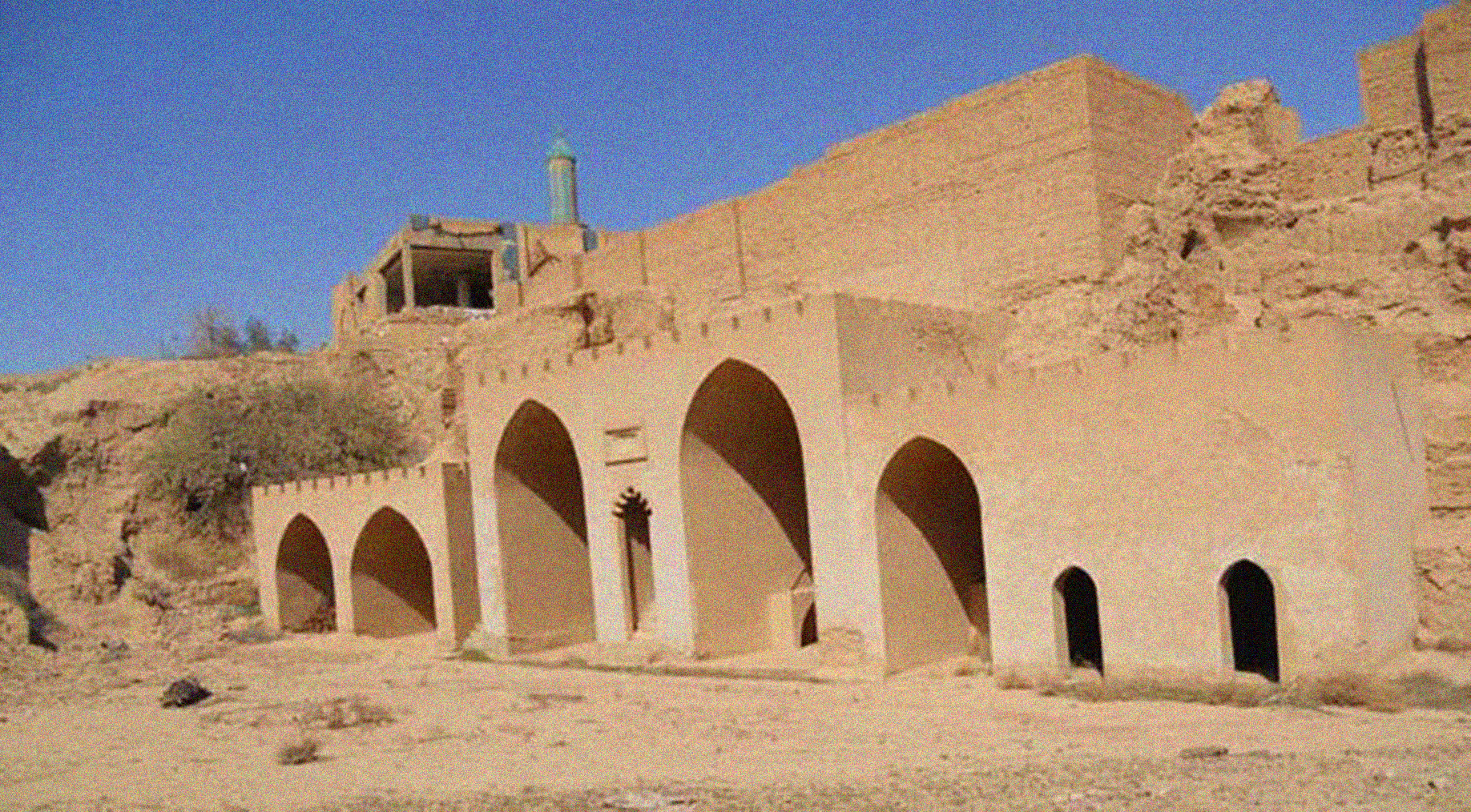
The Syriac Orthodox Saint Ahoadamah Church was a 7th-century church building in the city of Tikrit, one of the oldest in the world. 2014.

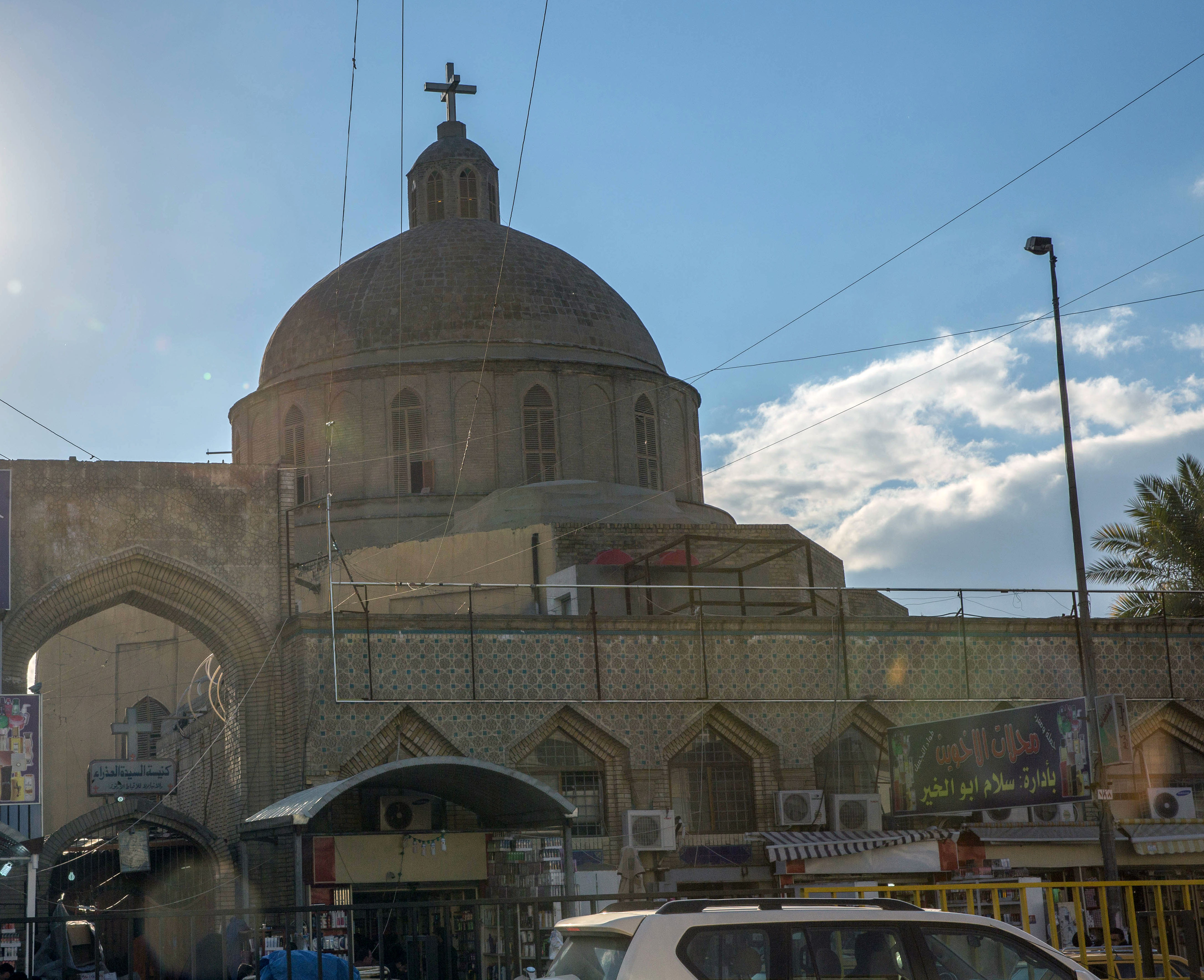
Latin Catholic St. Joseph's Cathedral in Shorja market, Baghdad

As of 21 June 2007, the UNHCR estimated that 2.2 million Iraqis had been displaced to neighboring countries and 2 million were displaced internally, with nearly 100,000 Iraqis fleeing to Syria and Jordan each month. Some of those refugees and internally displaced persons (IDPs) were Christians. A 25 May 2007 article noted that in the previous seven months only 69 people from Iraq had been granted refugee status in the United States. After the 2003 invasion of Iraq, violence against Christians rose, with reports of abduction, torture, bombings, and killings. Some Christians were pressured to convert to Islam under threat of death or expulsion, and women were ordered to wear Islamic dress.

In August 2004, International Christian Concern protested an attack by Islamists on Iraqi Christian churches that killed 11 people. In 2006, an Orthodox Christian priest, Boulos Iskander, was beheaded and mutilated despite payment of a ransom, and in 2008, the Assyrian clergyman Archbishop Paulos Faraj Rahho of the Chaldean Catholic Church in Mosul was killed after being abducted. In January 2008, bombs exploded outside nine churches.

In 2007, Chaldean Catholic priest Fr. Ragheed Aziz Ganni and subdeacons Basman Yousef Daud, Wahid Hanna Isho, and Gassan Isam Bidawed were all killed in Mosul. Ganni was driving with his three deacons when they were stopped and were ordered to convert to Islam; when they refused, they were shot. Ganni was the pastor of the Chaldean Church of the Holy Spirit in Mosul and a graduate from the Pontifical University of Saint Thomas Aquinas, Angelicum in Rome in 2003 with a licentiate in ecumenical theology. Six months later, the body of Paulos Faraj Rahho, archbishop of Mosul, was found buried near Mosul. He was kidnapped on 29 February 2008 when his bodyguards and driver were killed.

In 2010, reports emerged in Mosul of people being stopped in the streets, asked for their identity cards, and shot if they had a first or last name indicating Assyrian or Christian origin. On 31 October 2010, 58 people, including 41 hostages and priests, were killed after an attack on an Assyrian Syriac Catholic church in Baghdad. A group affiliated with Al-Qaeda, the Islamic State of Iraq, stated that Iraq's indigenous Christians were a "legitimate target." In November, a series of bombings and mortar attacks targeted Christian Assyrian-majority areas of Baghdad.

During the 2014 Northern Iraq offensive, the Islamic State issued a decree in July that all Christians in the area of its control should either pay a special tax of approximately $470 per family, convert to Islam, or die. Many of them took refuge in nearby Kurdish-controlled regions of Iraq and the Shi'a holy cities of Najaf and Karbala. Christian homes were painted with the Arabic letter ن (nūn) for Nassarah (an Arabic word that means "Christian" or literally "Nazarene") as well as a declaration that they were property of the Islamic State. On 18 July, jihadists reversed course and announced that all Christians would need to leave or be killed. Most Christians who fled had their valuable possessions stolen.

Numerous Christian militias were created and joined the Popular Mobilization Forces (PMF) that helped in the liberation of territories taken by ISIS. According to Chaldean Catholic Patriarch Louis Raphaël I Sako, there were no Christians remaining in Mosul in 2015, for the first time in the nation's history. But after Mosul's liberation in 2017, Christian families began to return.

=== Current situation ===
After the invasion of Iraq by the U.S. and its allies in 2003, Christians were targeted by Islamist extremists. Many of them fled from Baghdad and other areas to the Kurdistan region. Christians who were too poor or unwilling to leave their ancient homeland fled mainly to Erbil's Christian suburb of Ankawa. Around 10,000 Iraqi Christians live in the United Kingdom, led by Archbishop Athanasios Dawood, who has called on the government to accept more refugees. Apart from emigration, the Christian share of the population is also declining due to lower birth rates and higher death rates compared to that of the Muslim population. The war has caused the majority of Christians to leave Iraq.

Today, an estimated 150,000 to 400,000 Christians remain in Iraq, down from 1.1 million in 2003. Though the war has ended, fear and tensions persist. Many Christians have returned to their historic homeland, while few families have returned to Mosul. In an interview with Aid to the Church in Need, in 2014, ten years after the invasion of Mosul by ISIS, Chaldean Archbishop Bashar Warda, of Erbil, said that of the 13,200 families that had fled Mosul and Nineveh to Iraqi Kurdistan, around 9000 had returned, but that the Christian community still required international aid to avoid a new exodus.

As per the constitution, Christians are one of the recognized religious groups in Iraq. The constitution recognizes Aramaic as an official language in the Christian region. The Council of Christian Church Leaders is the official body for Christians. Christians participate in the political life of Iraq, although their political influence is limited due to their reduced population. According to Article 3 in the Constitution, all Iraqi communities and sects must be represented in the cabinet. Christians have five reserved seats in the Parliament from the constituencies of Baghdad, Basra, Mosul, Kirkuk and Duhok. There are several Christian political parties and organizations in Iraq, such as the Chaldean Democratic Union Party, Assyrian Democratic Movement, Chaldean National Congress, Bet-Nahrain Democratic Party, and Babylon Movement. Some of these parties have seats in the parliament, while others were unable to win a seat. Christian militias that formed in Iraq are either affiliated with political parties, the PMF or the Kurdish government. Many still operate and protect Christian areas in Iraq, either within the Kurdish Peshmerga or the PMF.

Christians are well-integrated in Christian-majority districts, Iraqi Kurdistan, and Shi'a-majority governorates in southeastern Iraq. They can take government jobs, access education, and use other facilities, all while facing no political discrimination. In Basra, Christians hold a quota seat on the provincial council, the highest local legislative and oversight authority. The council, which consists of 35 members, is more favored than the Mandaeans. Dozens of Christians also work as employees in various government institutions, and doctors among them enjoy a distinguished professional reputation. They have their own personal status law and Syriac is recognized as an official language of Iraq. From 5 to 8 March 2021, Pope Francis paid Iraq an apostolic visit, during which he visited the cities of Najaf, Baghdad, Ur, Mosul, Qaraqosh and Erbil. He met with Ayatollah Ali al-Sistani and delivered a message of coexistence between Christians and Muslims in Iraq.

In an online conference hosted by pontifical charity Aid to the Church in Need, in 2024, Nizar Semaan, the Syriac Catholic Archbishop of Adiabene, in Northern Iraq, said that there is still danger of social fragmentation. "The problem with Iraq is that we are trying to create isolated islands for each community, with no common life. This is dangerous. You can live wherever you want, you can be proud of your identity, but don’t close your island to other people." He further stated that Christians would remain in the region, because "the people here are like olive trees. You can cut them, burn them, but after 10 or 20 years they will continue to give fruit. They tried everything, but we remain, and as a Church we do everything to give a sign of hope”.

Although Christians are divided into many different groups and confessions, intermarriage is common and these differences are often neglected at a grassroots level. At an institutional level, ecumenical relations have improved since the persecutions carried out by the Islamic State, with a high point being the yearly joint celebration of the Exaltation of the Holy Cross, in September. Speaking to International Catholic charity Aid to the Church in Need, Chaldean Catholic Archbishop Bashar Warda explained that "young people from all Churches planned the festival together – organising prayers, sports, marathons, concerts, children’s games, and cultural events. Their collaboration became a visible sign of a new future. Older generations watched with admiration as the youth discovered that what unites them – their faith in Christ – is far greater than what divides them. In their hands, the dream of Christian unity in Iraq is already becoming a lived reality."

In March 2026 a drone struck and damaged a Church-owned building in Ankawa. The event unsettled the community, but no motive was ever ascertained, and no other attacks occurred in the following months.

In July 2026, Iraqi prime minister Ali al-Zaidi promised to make the return of Christian families to Iraq a priority, describing the Christian community as "an essential part of Iraqi society".

== Relations with non-Christians ==
From the late 13th century through to the present time, Christian Assyrians have suffered both religious and ethnic persecution, including a number of massacres and genocides.

In 2010, President Jalal Talabani did not sign the death sentence order for former Iraqi Foreign Minister Tariq Aziz as he "sympathise[d] with Tariq Aziz because he is an Iraqi Christian." This also came after appeals from the Holy See not to carry out the sentence. On 5 June 2015, Aziz died at al-Hussein hospital in Nasiriyah after suffering from depression, diabetes, heart disease, and ulcers.

=== Persecutions ===
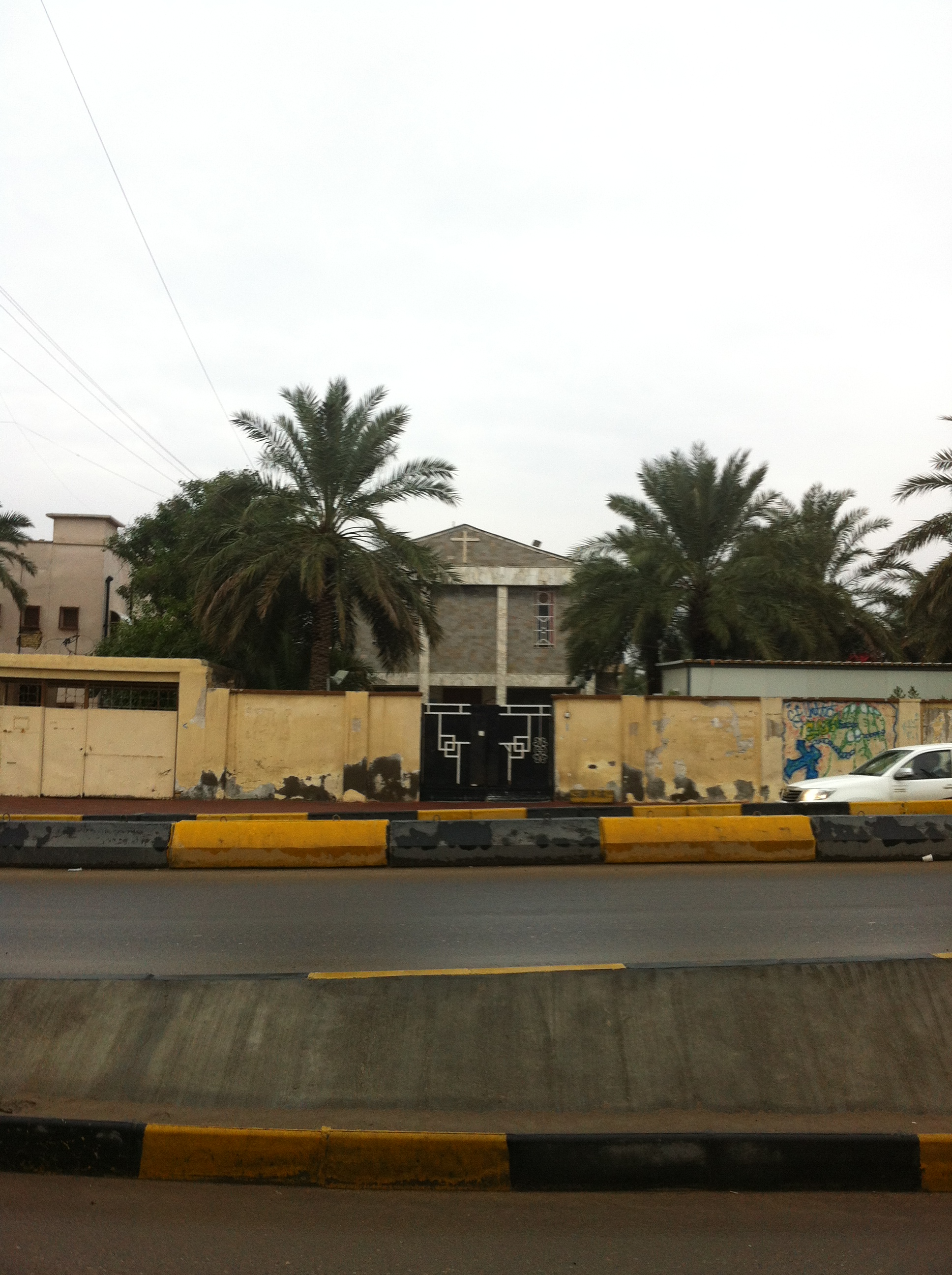
A Chaldean Catholic Church in Basra, 2014

Iraqi Christians have been victim of executions, forced displacement campaigns, torture, and violence, especially at the hands of Sunni fundamentalist groups like al-Qaeda and ISIS. Since the 2003 Iraq War, Iraqi Christians have fled from the country and their population has collapsed under the democratic government. The majority of Christians have either fled to Iraqi Kurdistan or abroad. A population project by the Shlama Foundation has estimated that, as of July 2020, 150,000 Christian Assyrians remain in Iraq, down from approximately 1.5 million in 2003.

In 2003, Iraqi Christians were the primary target of extremist Sunni Islamists. Many kidnapped Christians were forced to forsake Christianity or be tortured.

On 1 August 2004, a series of car bomb attacks took place during the Sunday evening Mass in churches of two Iraqi cities, Baghdad and Mosul, killing and wounding numerous Christians. Jordanian-Iraqi Sunni Arab Abu Musab al-Zarqawi was blamed for the attacks.

In 2006, an Orthodox priest, Boulos Iskander, was snatched off the streets of the Sunni city of Mosul by a Sunni group that demanded a ransom. His corpse was later found with its arms and legs cut off.

In 2007, reports emerged regarding an operation to drive Christians out of the historically Christian suburb of Dora in southern Baghdad, with some Muslim Arabs accusing the Christians of being allies of the Americans. Between 2007 and 2009, 239 similar cases were registered by police.

In 2008, a priest named Ragheed Ganni, was shot dead in his church along with three of his companions. That same year, reports came out that many Christian students were harassed.

In 2008, the charity Barnabas Aid conducted research into 250 Iraqi Christian IDPs who had fled to Iraqi Kurdistan to seek refugee status and found nearly half had witnessed attacks on churches or Christians or had been personally targeted by violence.

In 2009, the Kurdistan Regional Government (KRG) reported that more than 40,000 Christians had moved from Baghdad, Basra and Mosul into Iraqi Kurdistan's cities. Reports state that the number of Christian families moving to Iraqi Kurdistan is increasing. 11,000 of those families were reportedly given financial assistance and support, often in the form of employment, by the KRG.

On 31 October 2010, Sunni Islamist groups attacked a Syriac Catholic church in Baghdad during Sunday evening Mass, killing more than 60 Iraqi Christians and wounding another 78.

In 2011, Sunni extremists assassinated a Christian randomly using sniper rifles. Two months before the incident, two other Christians had been shot by a Sunni jihadist in Mosul, while another two were shot for unknown reasons in Baghdad.

On 30 May 2011, a Christian man was beheaded by a Sunni man in Mosul.

On 2 August 2011, a Catholic church was bombed by Sunni extremists in the Turkmen area of Kirkuk, wounding more than 23 Christians.

On 15 August 2011, a church was bombed by al-Qaeda in Kirkuk center.

On 24 November 2013, a Christian journalist was gunned down in a targeted attack in Mosul.

On 25 December 2013, in Baghdad, Sunni extremists detonated two bombs targeting Christians observing Christmas in the Al-Dora area of the Al-Rashid district of Baghdad. First, a bomb was detonated in the mainly Christian Athorien (Hay Al-Athoriyeen) neighborhood market, killing at least eleven and injuring 40. Then, a bomb was detonated outside St. John's Roman Catholic Church targeting Christmas service worshippers, killing 27 and injuring 56.

In 2014, during the 2014 Northern Iraq offensive, ISIS ordered all Christians in the area of its control, where the Iraqi Army collapsed, to pay a special tax of approximately $470 per family, convert to Sunni Islam, or die. Many of them took refuge in nearby Kurdish and Shia-majority areas of Iraq.

On 1 April 2025, an axe-wielding attacker struck a procession of Assyrian Christians celebrating their new year in Dohuk, Iraq, wounding three people. The assailant, who shouted Islamic slogans and identified with the Islamic State, injured a 17-year-old boy, a 75-year-old woman, and a local security officer. The attack occurred during the annual Akitu festival, which draws Assyrians from Iraq and the diaspora. Despite the violence, the Assyrian community continued the celebrations, displaying resilience. Local leaders condemned the attack and called for a review of educational curricula to address extremism.

==== Kurdification ====
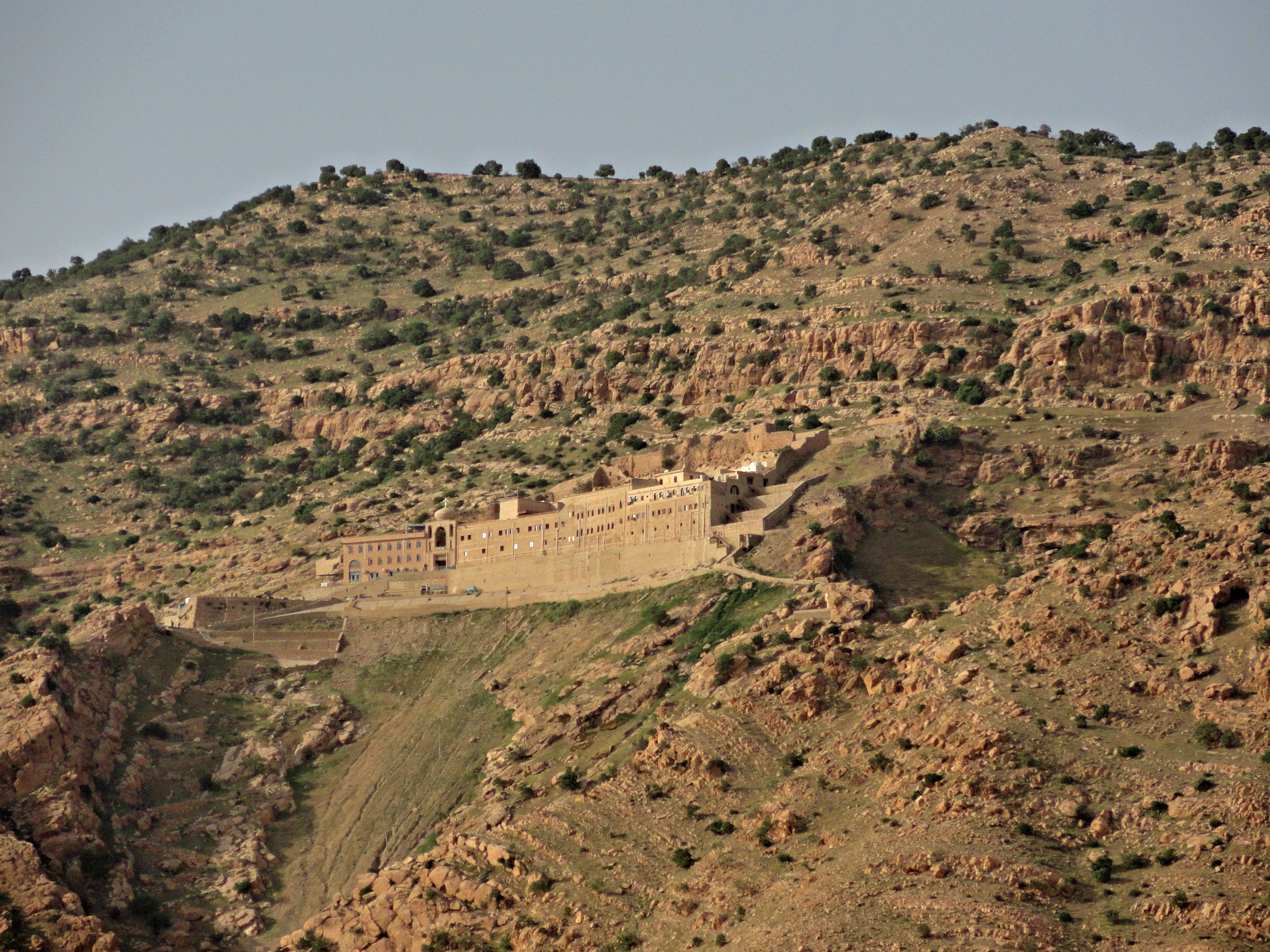
The Monastery of St. Matthew, located atop Mount Alfaf in northern Iraq, is recognized as one of the oldest Christian monasteries in existence and is famous for its magnificent library and considerable collection of Syriac Christian manuscripts.

Many Assyrians activists claim they have suffered not only from Arabization, but also Kurdification in Iraqi Kurdistan, mainly in KDP-controlled areas. Assyrian activists have claimed that the number of Christians live in Iraqi Kurdistan has declined. (Note: According to Assyrian historian Eden Naby, the relations between Assyrians and Kurds have been marked by a "bitter history", since Kurdish tribal chiefs in Iraq, southeastern Turkey, northeastern Syria, and northwest Iran regularly attacked and plundered Christian tribes, and Eden Naby writes that during World War I Kurds were "responsible for most of the atrocities committed against the Assyrians in particular, due to proximity and a long tradition of perceived Kurdish rights to pillage Assyrian Christians and carry away women and goods", and that "Kurdish expansion happened at the expense of Assyrians".) Iraqi Kurdistan accepted more than 200,000 Christians refugees and IDPs who had fled from other areas of Iraq between 2012 and 2016.

Many Assyrian organizations have also claimed that the Kurdistan Regional Government (KRG) has hindered international aid from reaching Christian Assyrians and at times attempted to prevent Assyrian Aramaic schools. However, the KRG's annual report stated that the government rebuilt and renovated over 20 Christian churches in the region and reconstructed more than 105 Christian villages.

Assyrians who have arrived as IDPs to Iraqi Kurdistan have demanded more rights from the KRG which has led to serious disputes. In 2014, Assyrian International News Agency stated:

Institutions and government agencies in the Iraqi Kurdistan Region use both languages. The Constitution also stipulates that Turkmen and Syriac are official languages in the administrative units where native speakers of these languages comprise a significant proportion of the population (a law has also included the Armenian language alongside Turkmen and Syriac). The Constitution notes that any region or province can adopt an additional language as a "local official language" if the majority of the region or province's residents agree to this in a general referendum.

Some have also complained that adults have to join the KDP in the KDP-majority areas of Iraqi Kurdistan in order to be granted employment and that KDP representatives are allowed to settle in Assyrian villages. Some Christian IDPs had claimed that Arabs, Kurds and Islamists are fully aware that Assyrians have no means of protection in the face of attacks. In 2005, the U.S. Department of State's 2005 Human Rights Country Report for Iraq shared reports that many of the mostly non-Muslim residents of the Nineveh Plains were unable to vote in the January election and incidents of voter fraud and intimidation occurred during the Iraq War. It was reported that Kurdish security forces also prevented ballot boxes from arriving in some Christian villages, fearing that Christians would favor the central Iraqi government. Some cases of illegal land and property seizures of Christian Assyrian lands by KDP members were also claimed.

Michael Youash, an Assyrian expert, had stated in a report that the KRG was unable to provide safe haven for all Christians. He claimed that the KDP publicizes that tens of thousands of Christian Assyrian families are coming to the safety of Iraqi Kurdistan from Arab areas, but "hundreds of thousands" of Christians are leaving the country (Iraq) entirely. He claims that this is directly connected to the problems of "illegal land seizures".

There have been reports that Kurdish security forces have also committed abuses against some Christians in northern Iraq during the Iraq War of 2003. These included threats and intimidation to detentions and torture. In 1992, Assyrians who supported Iraqi dictator Saddam Hussein published a communiqué, which warned against the continuous process of Kurdification in northern Iraq, stating: "The Kurdish leadership, and in a well-planned program, had begun to settle Kurds and in large numbers around Assyrian regions like Sarsank, Barwari Bala and others. They claimed that Kurdish housing project was natural to change the demographic, economic, and civic structure of the Christian regions in only few short years; a process that forced the Christians to emigrate as the vacant homes were overtaken by 'the Kurds'." Francis Yusuf Shabo was a Christian Assyrian politician who dealt with complaints by Christian Assyrians regarding their forced eviction from their villages during the Arabization and those same villages' later resettlement by Arabs and Kurds.

Human Rights Watch reported that some Kurds and minorities, including Christians, have gone into dispute over land. Saddam Hussein's genocidal campaign targeting Kurds, many of whom have returned to their villages, have had deep issues with local people (including Christian Assyrians) whom they have accused of supporting Saddam's genocidal campaign against them during the Al-Anfal campaign. According to the HRW, minorities in those disputed villages have been victimized by Kurdish authorities’ heavy handed tactics, "including arbitrary arrests and detentions, and intimidation, directed at anyone resistant to Kurdish expansionist plans". These disputes have created an opening for Sunni Arab extremists, who continue their campaign of killing minorities, especially religious Christian minorities.

HRW reported that for the Kurds to politically incorporate Nineveh Plains into Iraqi Kurdistan, Kurdish authorities in that area have embarked on a two-pronged approach: they have offered minorities of the Nineveh Plains inducements while simultaneously wielding repression in order to keep them in tow. Some argue that this approach intends to push Shabak and Yazidi communities into identifying as ethnic Kurds and to induce Christians into siding with the Kurdish government's stance on any referendum concerning the future of the disputed territories.

Kurdish authorities have tried to win favor with the minority communities by spending millions of Iraqi dinars to build a pro-Kurdish system of patronage by helping make minority communities wealthier, financing alternative civil society organizations to compete with, undermine, and challenge the authority of established groups, many of which oppose Kurdish rule. The KRG also funds private militias created to protect minority communities from outside violence, in which Iraqi authorities have failed, but which mainly serve to entrench Kurdish influence. Finally, the Kurdish leadership has enriched the coffers of Christian and Yazidi religious leaders and paid for expensive new places of worship in order to win over minority religious establishments.

In 2009, during the Iraq War, HRW stated that "KRG authorities have relied on intimidation, threats, and arbitrary arrests and detentions, more than actual violence, in their efforts to secure support of minority communities for their agenda regarding the disputed territories. A Chaldo-Assyrian leader described the Kurdish campaign to Human Rights Watch as “the overarching, omnipresent reach of a highly effective and authoritarian regime that has much of the population under control through fear.”

During the 2011 Dohuk riots, a group of Kurdish radical Islamists attacked properties of Christian Assyrians, Yazidis and non-Muslim Kurds. Attackers were instigated by Friday prayer sermons of radical clerics who had come from other parts of Iraq.

According to Youash Michael, Peshmerga forces oversaw security in the Nineveh Plains in 2008, allowing the KDP to deny the minorities of the Nineveh Plains a chance to express their will electorally. He also claimed that Kurds had seized the lands of two refugees and the KRG would not enforce any decree requiring the return of land to "original Assyrian inhabitants".

=== Freedom of religion ===
In 2026, Freedom House gave Iraq a score of 1 out of 4 for religious freedom. In the same year, Open Doors ranked Iraq as the 18th worst place in the world to be a Christian.

== Demographics ==
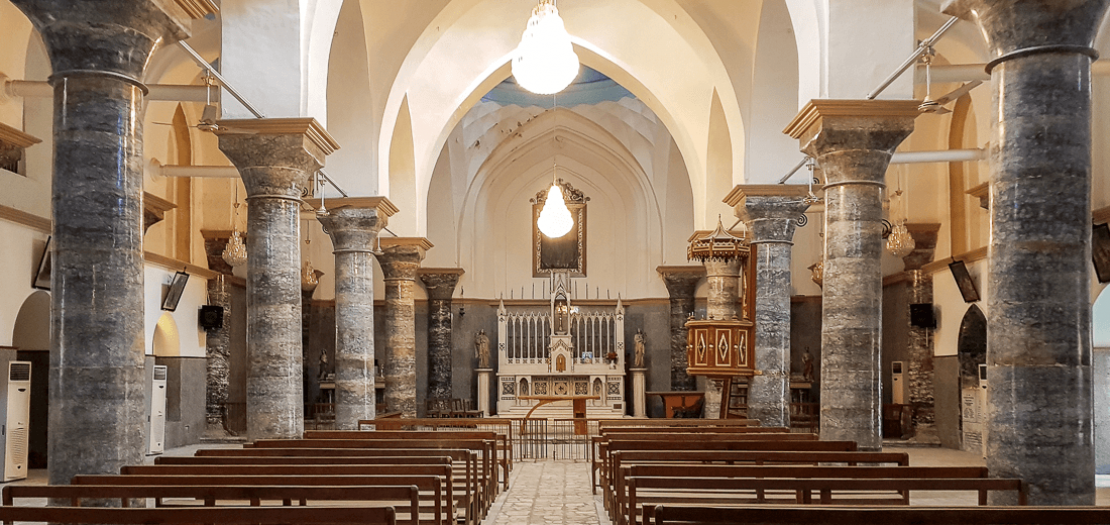
Cathedral of Our Lady of Sorrows in Baghdad

In 2022, Christian leaders report that the number of Christians has dropped from a pre-2003 estimate of fewer than 1.5 million to 150,000. However, due to a lack of an official census, the number is difficult to estimate. According to the Directorate of Christian Affairs in the Ministry of Endowments, around 350,000–400,000 Christians live in Iraq.

80% of Iraqi Christians belong to the Chaldean Catholic Church which, despite the name "Chaldean", consists mostly of ethnic Assyrians just as the Assyrian and Syriac churches do. The Chaldean Catholic Church is a 17th-century offshoot of the Assyrian Church of the East, which maintains some followers to this day. Before the advent of Islam, most people living in what is now Iraq followed Syriac Christianity, Eastern Orthodoxy, Catholicism, Judaism, or ancient Mesopotamian religions. There are about 60,000 Iraqi Armenians who follow either the Armenian Apostolic Church or the Armenian Catholic Church. Several thousand Arab Christians who are either Greek Orthodox or Melkite Catholic are largely concentrated in Baghdad. Other Christians live primarily in Basra, Mosul, Erbil, and Kirkuk, as well as in the Assyrian homeland regions of Nineveh Plains, Duhok, and Zakho in the north.

Christian Group	Christian Denominations	% of Christian population
Chaldeans (80%)	Chaldean Catholic Church	80%
Syriacs (10%)	Syriac Catholic Church	8%
Syriacs (10%)	Syriac Orthodox Church	2%
Assyrians (5%)	Assyrian Church of the East	5%
Assyrians (5%)	Ancient Assyrian Church of the East	5%
Armenians (3%)	Armenian Orthodox Church	3%
Armenians (3%)	Armenian Catholic Church	3%
Arabs (2%)	Various	2%

== Christian communities ==
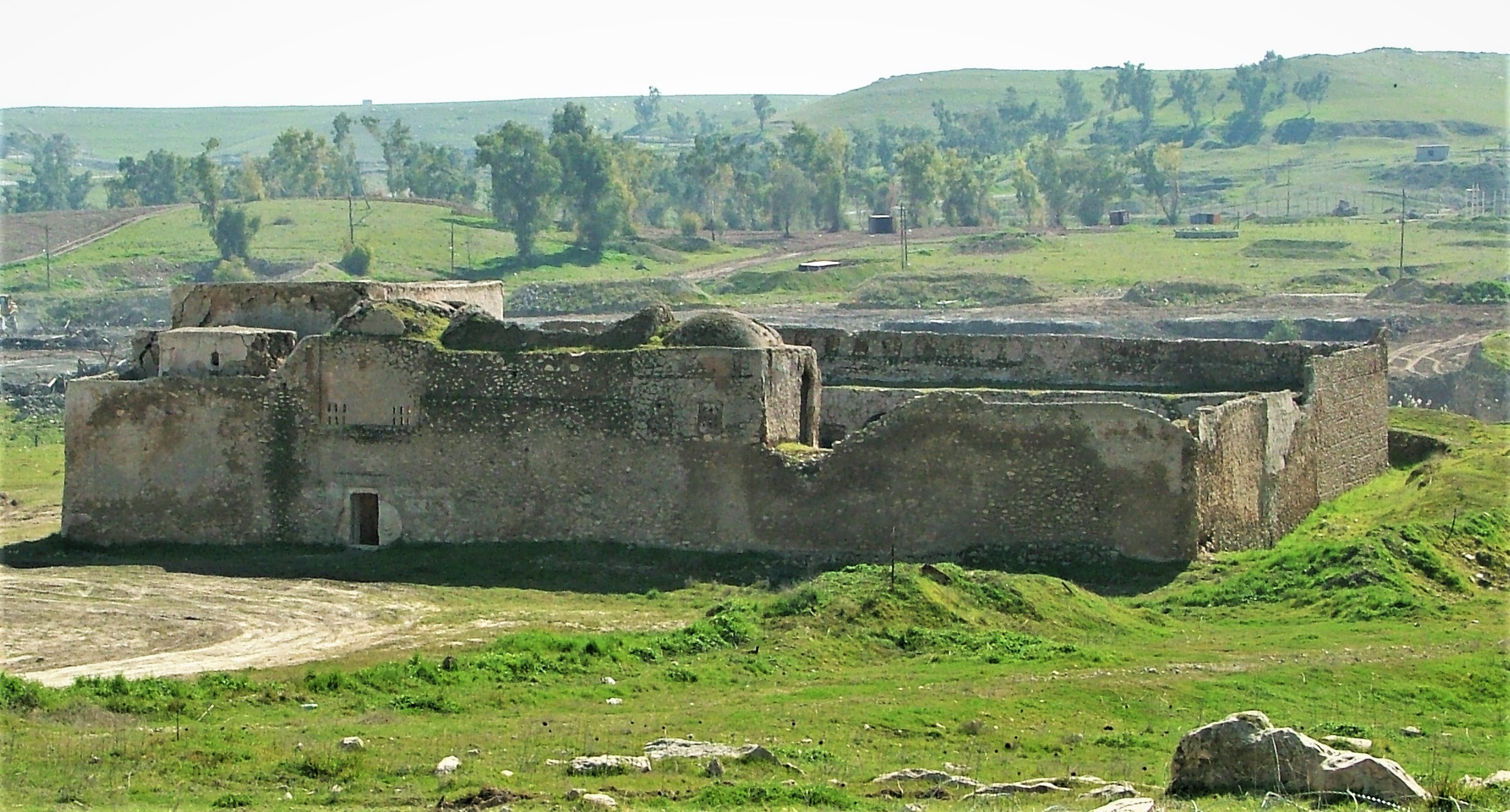
The ruins of Saint Elijah's Monastery founded in 595 AD south of Mosul by the Christian monk Mar Elia

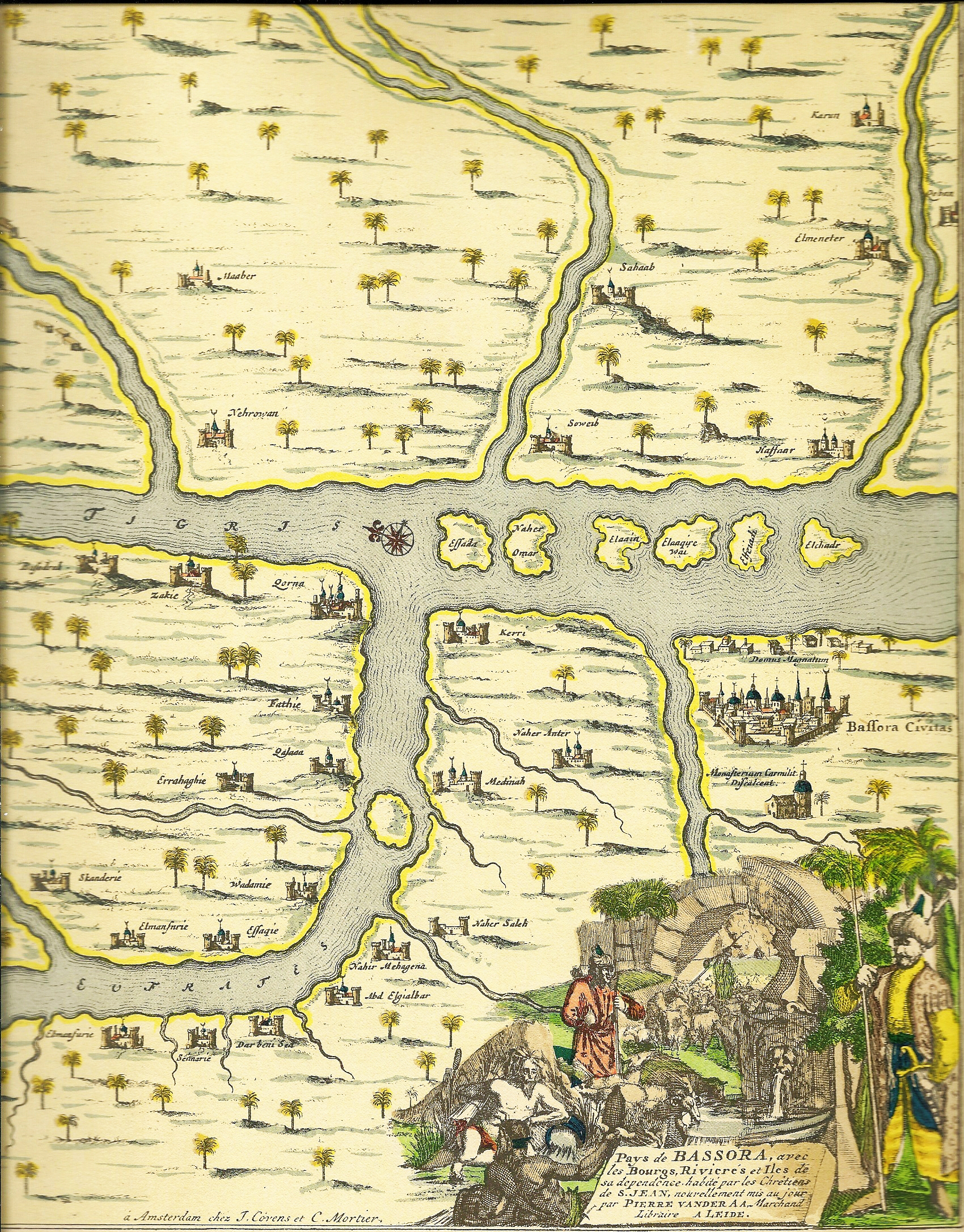
A new epoch began in the 17th century when Emir Afrasiyab of Basra allowed the Portuguese to build a church.

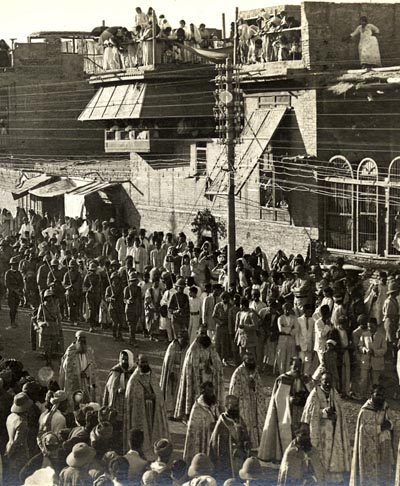
Celebration of Corpus Christi in Iraq, 1920, attended by Assyrians and Armenians

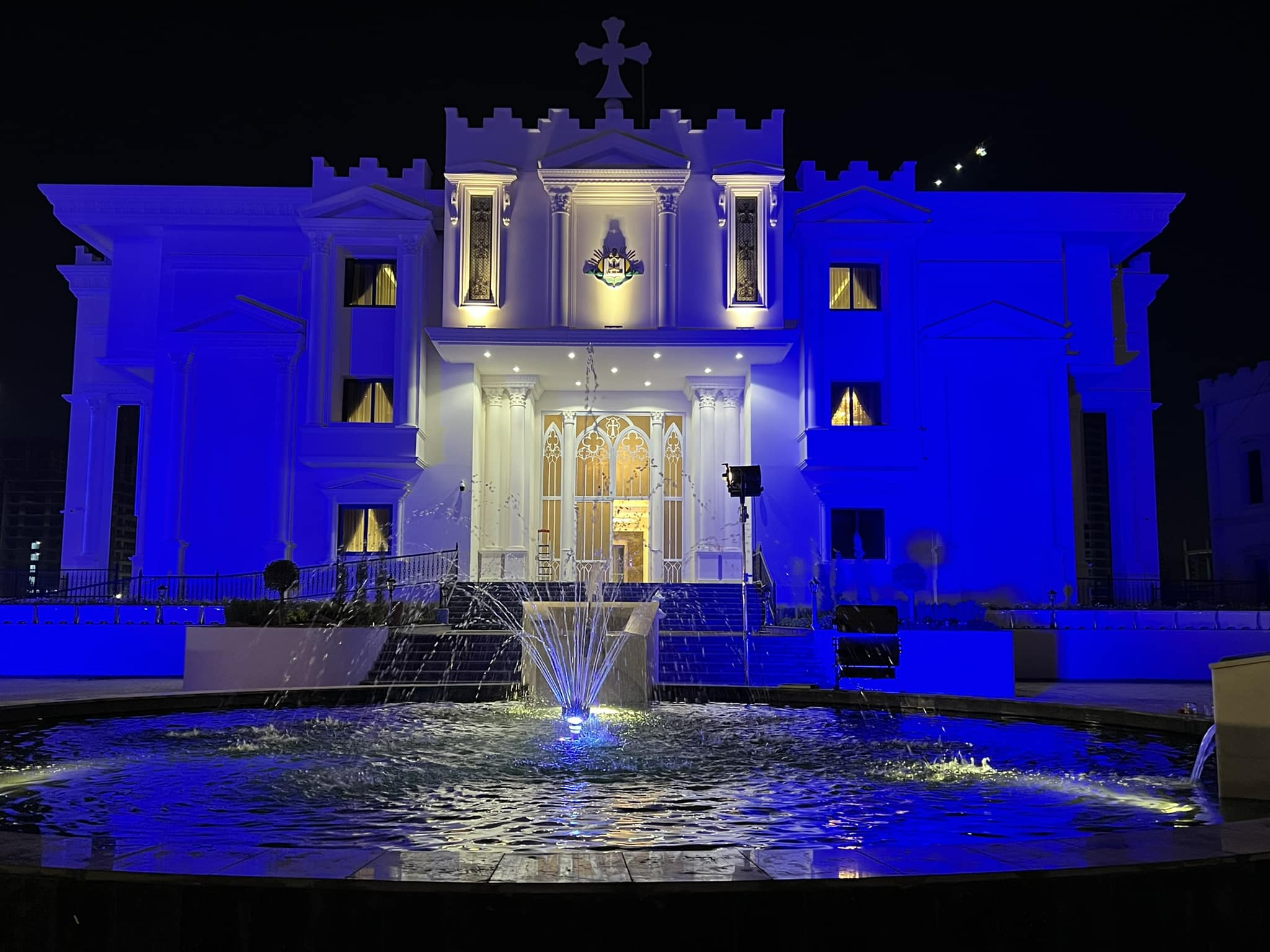
The patriarchate of the Assyrian Church of the East in Erbil

=== Churches of the Syriac Rite ===
The majority of Iraqi Christians belong to branches of Syriac Christianity, whose followers are mostly ethnic Assyrians adhering to both the East Syriac Rite and West Syriac Rite:

- Chaldean Catholic Church
- Syriac Catholic Church
- Syriac Orthodox Church
- Assyrian Church of the East
- Ancient Church of the East
- Assyrian Evangelical Church
- Assyrian Pentecostal Church

=== Churches of the Armenian rite ===
Followers of these churches are almost exclusively ethnic Armenians, using the Armenian Rite:

- Armenian Catholic Church
- Armenian Apostolic Church

=== Churches of the Byzantine rite ===
Followers of these churches are an ethnic mix known as Melkites:

- Melkite Catholic Church under the Patriarchal Exarchate of Iraq
- Melkite Orthodox Church under the jurisdiction of the Archdiocese of Baghdad

=== Other churches and communities ===
- Latin Church (Roman Rite)
- Protestant churches

== Notable people ==
=== Politics ===
- Thabit AbdulNour (1890–1957), director of oil department and representative of Christians
- Yusuf Salman Yusuf, also referred to as "Comrade Fahd", Iraqi Assyrian, one of the founders and most influential figures of the Iraqi Communist Party
- Tariq Aziz (1936–2015), Chaldean Catholic, Deputy Prime Minister and Foreign Minister under Saddam Hussein
- Basim Bello (1963–2024), longest serving mayor of the Tel Keppe District.
- Bahnam Zaya Bulos, former Minister of Transport

=== Priests ===
- Father Anastase-Marie al-Karmali

=== Intellectuals ===
- Youssef Rizq Allah Ghanima

=== Sports ===
- Ammo Baba, Iraqi Assyrian footballer and coach
- Ayoub Odisho, Iraqi Assyrian footballer and coach
- Justin Meram, Iraqi Assyrian footballer

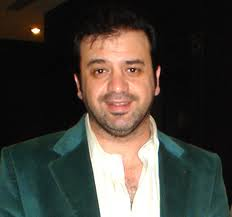
Haitham Yousif

=== Artists ===
- Seta Hagopian, renowned Armenian singer, referred to as "Warm Voice of Iraq" and the "Fairouz of Iraq"
- Afifa Iskandar
- Munir Bashir
- Linda George, Iraqi Assyrian singer
- Simor Jalal, Iraqi Assyrian singer
- Beatrice Ohanessian, Iraqi Armenian pianist
- Haitham Yousif, Assyrian singer referred to as "Prince of Love" in the Arab world

== See also ==
- Religion in Iraq
- Freedom of religion in Iraq
- Persecution of Christians in Iraq
- Arab Christians
- Assyrian people
- Chaldean Catholics
- Assyrian Church of the East
- Chaldean Catholic Church
- Catholic Church in Iraq
- Demographics of Iraq
- Syriac Catholic Church
- Syriac Orthodox Church
- Kurdish Christians
- Christian influences on the Islamic world
- Christianity and Islam
- Christianity in the Middle East
- Religion in the Middle East
- Mor Mattai Monastery
- List of churches and monasteries in Nineveh
- Delegation Apostolic of Mesopotamia, Kurdistan, and Armenia
