= Abd al-Nur =

ʻAbd al-Nūr (ALA-LC romanization of Arabic: عبد النور) is a male given name and, in modern usage, surname. The name is used by Muslims and also by Coptic and Orthodox Christians in the Middle East. It is built from the Arabic words ʻabd and al-Nūr, one of the names of God in the Qur'an, which give rise to the Muslim theophoric names. It means "servant of the Light".

Because the letter n is a sun letter, the letter l of the al- is assimilated to it. Thus although the name is written in Arabic with letters corresponding to Abd al-Nur, the usual pronunciation corresponds to Abd an-Noor. Alternative transliterations include Abdennour and others, all subject to variable spacing and hyphenation.

== Notable people ==
- Monir Fakhri Abdel Nour (born 1945), Egyptian politician
- Jean Abdelnour (born 1983), Lebanese basketball player
- Cyrine Abdelnour (born 1977), Lebanese singer, actress, and model
- Aymen Abdennour (born 1989), Tunisian footballer
- Mustafa Haji Abdinur (born 1981), Somali journalist
- James Abdnor (1923–2012), American politician
- Abdulahad AbdulNour (1888–1948), Iraqi physician, politician, and humanitarian
- Thabit AbdulNour (1890–1957), Iraqi politician, government administrator, and diplomat
- Abdennour Abrous (1934–2020), Algerian diplomat
- Abdennour Cherif El Ouazzani (born 1986), Algerian footballer
- Antone AbdulNour (1849–1914), Judge, merchant, and scholar in Mosul, Ottoman Empire
- Abdulaziz AbdulNour (1850–1927) Judge, merchant, and philanthropist in Mosul, Ottoman Empire and Iraqi Kingdom
