= Noor Matti =

Assyrian-American radio and TV host

- ܢܗܪܐ ܡܬܝ نور متي
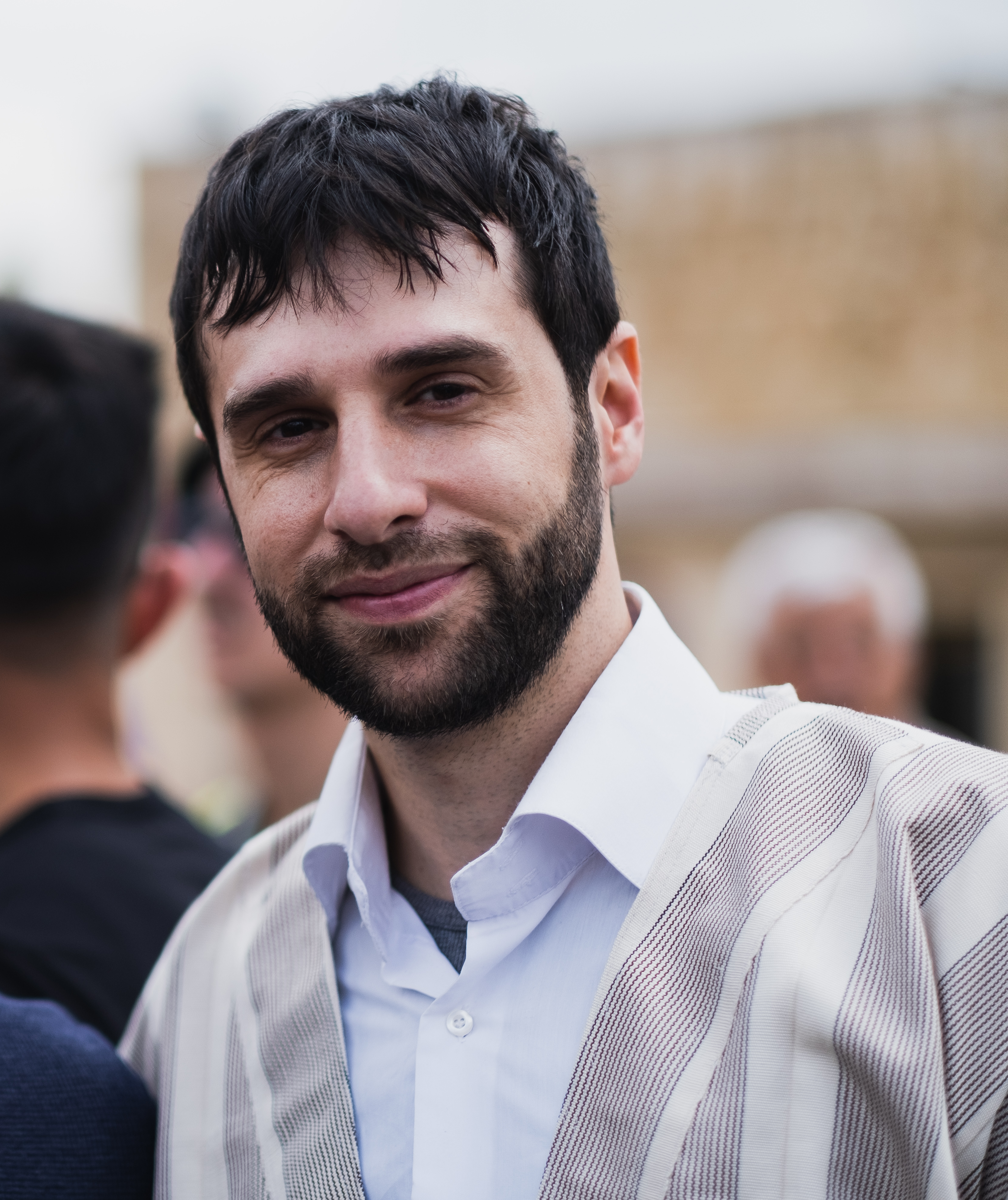
- Matti in 2019
- Born: Baghdad, Iraq
- Education: Bachelor of Science
- Alma mater: Wayne State University
- Occupations: Radio and TV host
- Years active: 2010–present
- Known for: Babylon FM, Shlama Foundation

Noor Matti (Syriac: ܢܗܪܐ ܡܬܝ) (Arabic: نور متي) is an Assyrian American former radio and television host and charity worker. Originally from Iraq, he is most prominently known for creating Babylon FM in Erbil, the first all-English radio station in Iraq. He is also known for being one of the founding members of the Shlama Foundation, a nonprofit which works to preserve and better the lives of Assyrians in Iraq.

== Early life ==
Matti was born to an Assyrian family belonging to the Chaldean Catholic Church in Baghdad, but was raised in Erbil's Ankawa area. His father had been involved in Iraqi politics through the Iraqi Communist Party. In 1992, his family left the country after the worsening situation due to the United Nations' sanctions against Iraq. His family and other Iraqi refugees arrived in the shores of Greece after taking a boat from Turkey, and in 1994, his family finally settled in Warren, Michigan.

Matti initially enrolled in Multimedia at Wayne State University, but switched to a Bachelor of Science in Biology after disapproval from his family.

== Move to Iraq and Career ==
Around the time he was at university, Matti began to experience depression after wanting to learn more about his culture. After graduating from Wayne State University, Matti decided to move back to Iraq in 2008, not knowing Arabic and Kurdish. Originally, Matti began to work as an English teacher, but in 2010, he began to present the news in English for Ishtar TV, an Assyrian-owned media channel. In 2012, he joined Babylon Media Group and began to craft Babylon FM as the only all-English radio station in Iraq. In October 2012, he went on air with "Noor In The Morning." After the establishment of Babylon FM in 2012, Matti began to host morning shows that reached Duhok, Sulaymaniyah and Mosul, totaling an audience as much as 15,000 daily.

Matti was active in radio during the invasion of the Islamic State in Iraq and Syria. In 2015, he received death threats from the terrorist group, after continuously mocking the terror group from nearby Erbil. He cited this time as the most difficult of his life, witnessing active Persecution of Christians by the Islamic State and running the Shlama Foundation at the same time. In October 2018, Matti returned to television and began to host the weekly Arabic TV show "'Bene w Benak'" on Babylon TV, where he interviews young professionals from Iraq and the region. Matti was also featured in Larry Charles' Dangerous World of Comedy, where he discussed his move from Iraq and his role on Babylon FM in helping his community in the Kurdish region during the occupation of ISIS.

Besides regularly presenting shows on Babylon FM and Babylon TV, Matti has hosted various events and occasions in Erbil including the 2016 Miss Kurdistan beauty pageant.

== Philanthropy ==
After the invasion of the Nineveh Governorate by the Islamic State in August 2014, Matti co-founded the Shlama Foundation, an NGO helping Assyrian communities throughout Iraq. He is currently the president of the foundation. His work through the foundation led to him be invited to present for the 2017 Raoul Follereau congress, as well as directly collaborate with the United States Agency for International Development.

Matti currently works with Chemonics International to manage US-AID projects going into Iraq, especially for the Assyrian community. He was able to complete the Ta'afi program, allocating near US$9 billion to help those in the Nineveh Plains.

In 2024, Matti published an opinion article with an independent Assyrian-owned news outlet, discussing the threat of language shift that Assyrians student faced due to the privatization of education in Iraq.

In 2025, he was named Assyrian Person of the Year by The Assyria Post.

== Personal life ==
Matti's family, which includes his parents and his sister, Solaf, live in Metro Detroit after settling from Iraq.

Matti is married to Maryam Maleh and is the father of one child. In his spare time, he likes to play with his Nintendo Switch, as well as listen to music and jog.
