= Babylon FM =

- Erbil; Iraq
- Frequency: 99.3 MHz

Programming
- Format: Top 40, Hit Music

Ownership
- Owner: Babylon Media Group
- Sister stations: Radio Al-Salam

History
- First air date: 2012

Technical information
- Facility ID: 36.24136577460652
- ERP: 3,400 watts
- Transmitter coordinates: 36°14′28.91″N 43°59′57.12″E

Links
- Webcast: Listen live
- Website: babylonfm.net

Babylon FM is a contemporary hit radio station located in Erbil, Iraq. The station is owned by Babylon Group and broadcasts from studios in the Babylon Media headquarters located in the city's Ankawa district. The station is the only all-English radio station in all of Iraq. The station is the official partner of American Top 40 show in the country.

== History ==
Babylon Media Group CEO Salwan Zaito launched Babylon FM in 2012, as an all-Jazz radio station, catering only to Erbil city. After one year of broadcasting, the station changed its format to hit music in September 2012 with Assyrian presenter Noor Matti joining the company. The station came to be known as the only all-English radio station in all of Iraq. The first all-English live show (Noor in the Morning) went on air October 15, 2012. In March 2013, British radio personal Angel B joined the morning show, along with the Dutch-Kurd Maze to create the Breakfast Club.

2014 and 2015, the station quickly became popular within the expat community as well as the local youth population, as the Ipsos polls showed the station within top 20 for the first time in Erbil. The station expanded to broadcast in Duhok on 17 April 2015. Three months later, the station began to broadcast in Iraqi Kurdistan's second largest city, Slemani.

As Iraqi Kurdistan's expat community continued to become more diverse, the station began to broadcast 1-hour shows in different language, with Pierrick Bonno going on air in French for the first time in early 2015.

In 2021, the channel expanded to broadcast in Baghdad's frequency of 97.3.

== Shows ==
- The Breakfast Club
- The Drive
- Babylon Singles Chart
- American Top 40
- To Karpouzi
- El Fasolia
- Slava Plus
- La French Touch
