= Srood Maqdasy =

Iraqi Assyrian politician

- سرود سليم متي مقدسي
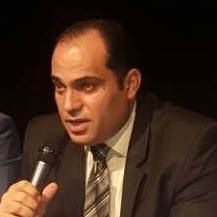

Member of Parliament in the Kurdistan Region
- In office 2014–2018

Personal details
- Born: Srood Maqdasy; September 15, 1975 (age 50–51) Ankawa, Erbil
- Party: Sons of Mesopotamia
- Occupation: Physician, Politician

Srood Salem Matti Maqdasy is an Assyrian physician, politician, and former member of the Kurdistan Region Parliament in Iraq. Maqdasy stood out as one of just eleven representatives elected to represent minority groups in Iraqi Kurdistan's 111-member assembly, after their elections in 2013. He was one of five total Assyrians in parliament after the elections, and served in the parliament until 2018.

Maqdasy represented the Sons of Mesopotamia, an Assyrian political party that was formed after dissatisfaction with the Assyrian Democratic Movement.

== Early life ==
Maqdasy was born in Ankawa, Iraq, where he grew up in a relatively safe Assyrian neighborhood. His father was a government employee, working in the directorate of agriculture in Erbil. His father had previously served in the Iraqi Armed Forces as a soldier during the Iraq-Iran War. His mother was a housewife, who Maqdasy says held their family together during his father's deployments during the war. He was born into the Chaldean Catholic Church.

He recalls his childhood as a simple one, although with some challenges due to the harsh political situation at the time. In an interview with Assyrian National Broadcasting, Maqdasy reflected on his childhood in more detail, saying:

"We were happy and content with what we had, much more than the complicated life children are leading nowadays. We felt safe playing in the streets or other public places with family members and friends. Occasionally, there were some unpleasant events that befell our community from time to time, especially when we received the bodies of our martyrs of the Iran-Iraq War. I can't forget their faces. The cries of the souls of their loved ones still haunt me today."

Maqdasy completed his master's degree in orthopedic surgery from Salahaddin University in Erbil, where he also completed his bachelor's degree and graduated from the College of Medicine. He had previously attended grade school in Ankawa.

== Career ==
=== Medicine ===
After graduating from the College of Medicine in Erbil, Maqdasy started working as an intern physician at various hospitals in Erbil. He later worked as an orthopedic senior house adviser at Erbil Teaching Hospital. Soon afterwards, he was promoted to an orthopedic senior officer, where he was awarded a high degree of specialty in orthopedic surgery.

In 2008, Zowaa reported how Maqdasy was able to help a young Assyrian receive a medical procedure in the United States, an initiative undertaken by the Assyrian Medical Society.

=== Politics ===
Maqdasy became involved in political work when he joined the Assyrian Democratic Movement in 1997. He held various positions in the organization's Erbil branch. In 2007, he was elected to serve as the head of the fifth conference of the ADM in Duhok, and three years later in 2010, was elected to serve as a member of the party's oversight committee during its seventh conference in Baghdad.

Maqdasy says he pursued a career in politics to be an advocate for the Assyrian people, who had suffered from neglect and marginalization since the early 20th century. He stated he believes the national identity and ethnic rights of Assyrians have been denied in Iraq, despite the fact that they are the indigenous people of the land.

In 2013, Maqdasy resigned from the ADM, along with a number of the party's leaders and members, after dissatisfaction with the party's direction under Yonadam Kanna. He, alongside other members who left, formed the Sons of Mesopotamia (Abnaa Al-Nahrain), and was elected to serve in the Kurdish parliament in 2013 representing the new party. He had received the most votes under his list in the elections, and was the only seat for the new party alongside ADM and the Chaldean Syriac Assyrian Popular Council.

During his tenure, he would be vocal about the political marginalization and second-class treatment that Assyrians faced under the KRG, saying in an interview, "“We can call it a feeling of superiority, we have religious problem, we have problem with regard to land occupation and properties, a lot of problems. So this council will follow these issues...”. In 2017, Maqdasy took part in a delegation to meet with the United Nations Assistance Mission for Iraq to discuss the issue of land grabbing that Assyrians continued to face in the KRG, being assured by the director that the issue would be looked into.

After the Fall of Mosul to ISIS, Maqdasy advocated for an autonomous region for ethnic minorities in Iraq, as well as for personal defense of these minority groups by providing weaponry. Maqdasy would show support for ethnic coexistence and genocide prevention abroad as well, including a visit to Armenia in 2016 as a representative of the KRG.

In 2018, after ISIS had been defeated, Maqdasy expressed dissatisfaction over the roles of the Peshmerga and Popular Mobilization Forces in the Nineveh Plains, and preventing demographic returns after the violence had ended. Before the 2018 Kurdistan Region parliamentary election, he participated in signing a joint letter that called for a delay to the elections until a quota law was amendment that restricted minority voting to solely the Assyrian community, but received no response. Maqdasy had previously chose not to attend a parliamentary session in 2017 that would've mandated the 2017 Kurdistan Region independence referendum, alongside two other independent Assyrian parliamentarians.

Addressing the European Parliament in 2025, Maqdasy called for an Assyrian autonomous region in the Nineveh Plains, citing the challenges that have been faced over the last 20 years and the need to maintain the cultural and ethnic diversity of the region.

== Quotes ==
‘‘We’ve been here as an ethnicity for 6,000 years and as Christians for 1,700 years...We have our own culture, language and tradition. If we live within other communities, all of this will be dissolved within two generations.’’
