= Basim Bello =

Iraqi-Assyrian politician (1963–2024)

Bassim Bello ܒܣܝܡ ܒܝܠܘ باسم بيلو
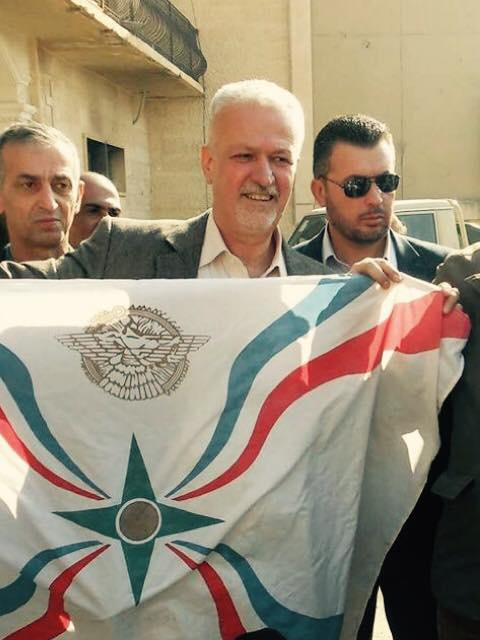
- Bello holding the Assyrian flag in Tel Keppe following its liberation from ISIS

Mayor of Tel Keppe
- In office 2018 (reinstatement) – 2024
- Preceded by: Adel Marogy Jajou
- Succeeded by: Raad Naser
- In office 2004–2017

Personal details
- Born: 1963 Alqosh, Iraq
- Died: 16 December 2024 (aged 61) Duhok, Iraq
- Party: Assyrian Democratic Movement, Sons of Mesopotamia (former)

Basim Bello (Syriac: ܒܣܝܡ ܒܝܠܘ; 1963 – 16 December 2024) was an Iraqi Assyrian politician. Originally from Alqosh, he was the mayor of the town of Tel Keppe and was also the longest serving mayor of the Tel Keppe District. An adherent of the Chaldean Catholic Church, Bello was a member of the Assyrian Democratic Movement, until he split from the party in 2013 to co-form Sons of Mesopotamia.

== Early life and career ==
Bello was born in Alqosh in 1963 and was first elected as mayor of Tel Keppe in 2004, being its mayor during the Iraq War. As a member of the Assyrian Democratic Movement, he took up many initiatives to help protect the Assyrian population of his village. In 2010, he attended a ceremony alongside the 1st Battalion, 36th Infantry Regiment to reopen a primary school in the town.

Bello had been openly critical of the Kurdistan Democratic Party and their motives in the Nineveh Plains, which had caused him to be caught in controversy in the past. In 2008, an official statement by ADM defended Bello from accusations made by the Chaldean Syriac Assyrian Popular Council, which alleged that he had exploited his position as mayor in order to prevent them from meeting with the United Nations in Iraq. He was also openly critical of the KRG aiming to assert control over areas of the Nineveh Plains, which were made known through a WikiLeaks document from 2008. In an interview with Religious Freedom Coalition, Bello stated "Christians are the meat in the sandwich between the Arabs and the Kurds...", and advocated for the designation of Nineveh as an administrative unit within Iraq. Earlier during the course of the Iraq War, Bello had faced threats to his position as mayor from the KDP, when he was publicly reprimanded for official government trips that were under the jurisdiction of the Federal government of Iraq.

When ISIS took over the Nineveh Plains in 2014, Bello was evacuated from the town until it was retaken by the Iraqi Ground Forces. Bello mentioned that he wasn't able to count the remaining Assyrian families living in Tel Keppe, but expressed hope for the future and for his role as mayor of the town. Facing demographic changes in his district, Bello advocated for religious minorities by saying in December 2019, "Our territories used to have a Christian trace, but that is not the case anymore" and "If the constitution is amended, our rights and protection must be included."

Bello left ADM in 2013 to co-found Sons of Mesopotamia, and would serve on its committee until its dissolution to reunite with ADM in 2024.

== Deposal and reinstatement as mayor ==
In August 2017, Bello was deposed as mayor by the KDP-led Nineveh Provincial Council. His dismissal came after that of Faiz Abed Jahwareh in place of Lara Zara in Alqosh. In an interview with Assyria TV, Bello stated that he was aware of the intention for the NPC to remove him prior to their official decision. He also mentioned that his removal was in relation to the 2017 Kurdistan Region independence referendum, and removing any potential opposition to the voting.

He was reinstated in August 2018 following a decree by the Nineveh Governorate, which relieved Jajou of his position. Following the decree, Bello stated in an interview with the Assyrian Policy Institute, "I am grateful to all the people who stood by us and supported us, in whichever form their support may have come. It gave us the strength to continue working to secure our rights as prescribed by law. We will continue to seek justice for our people. What happened today was uplifting for all of us—this isn't about me as an individual. It's about all of our Assyrian people who today at least saw one of our rights returned to us".

Bello continued to work towards helping the remaining Assyrian population in Tel Keppe, providing opportunities for building necessary structures and encouraging returns of former inhabitants. In 2024, Bello was removed by the Babylon Brigade and Rayan al-Kildani in a mass leadership change of Christian and Yezidi leaders in the Nineveh Plains, and replaced by Raad Naser.

== Death ==
On 16 December 2024, ADM announced that Bello had died earlier that day, at a hospital in Duhok, at the age of 61. He was described as someone who held great passion for his community and work, and his death was commemorated by diaspora organisations, such as the Shlama Foundation.
