= Sons of Mesopotamia =

Sons of Mesopotamia ܒܢ̈ܝ ܢܗܪ̈ܝܢ أبناء النهرين
- Leader: Basim Bello
- Founded: July 20, 2013
- Dissolved: March 22, 2024
- Ideology: Assyrian nationalism Self-determination; Populism
- National affiliation: Athra Alliance

Website
- www.bnaynahrain.com

The Sons of Mesopotamia (Syriac: ܒܢ̈ܝ ܢܗܪ̈ܝܢ, Arabic: أبناء النهرين) was an Iraqi Assyrian political party. It was founded in 2013, and was headquartered in Erbil, Iraq. Established to further the political objectives of the Assyrian people in Iraq, the party won one seat in the 2013 Kurdistan Region parliamentary election.

The party was named after Mesopotamia, also known as Beth Nahrain, or "the land of rivers" which was the historical location of Assyria, the ancient empire that encompassed Iraq, Syria, and parts of Iran and Turkey. The chosen name reflects on the ethnic identity of the party's members, as well as their ongoing struggle to reclaim rights for Assyrians in their ancestral lands.

The Sons of Mesopotamia was the first and only Assyrian-led political party with a female president, headed by both Galeta Shaba and Basim Bello, the former mayor of Tel Keppe.

== History ==
The Sons of Mesopotamia was founded as a splinter group after a number of its members became disillusioned with the leadership of the Assyrian Democratic Movement (ADM) and Yonadam Kanna. In a statement issued on July 20, 2013, former members of the ADM, led by Shmaiel Nanno, announced the split. In the statement, the party acknowledged that their departure from ADM was not an easy decision, but was necessary as conditions for Assyrians in Iraq had drastically worsened since the US invasion of Iraq. The party specified a number of reasons for the split, citing mistrust and misguided leadership under Kanna, a complete monopolization of authority, continued violations against the party's principles and regulations, and disputes regarding strategy.

The split came as a devastating blow to the ADM, as several notable members—including Shmaiel Nanno, Mikhael Benjamin,and Srood Maqdasy—were among those who left the party and joined the Sons of Mesopotamia. Their departure created confusion and a loss of confidence in ADM leadership, causing friction among community members. Despite the split, Sons of Mesopotamia has reaffirmed their support for ADM's stated principles and policy platform, and referenced the three martyrs of ADM, Yousip, Youbert, and Youkhanna, in their mission statement. Many members and supporters see the political party as a realization and restoration of ADM's original mission.

In 2023, the party joined the Athra Alliance, a political alliance representing Assyrian interests in Iraq.

== Political ideology ==
The Sons of Mesopotamia claims to have maintained its commitment to universal Assyrian objectives to secure the rights of Assyrians in Iraq, specifically in northern Iraq and the Nineveh Plain. Their focus is geared towards addressing the increasing violence targeting Assyrians, oppressive policies implemented by the Kurdistan Regional Government (KRG), underrepresentation in the Kurdistan Region of Iraq, the rapid demographic change in historically Assyrian lands, encroachment on Assyrian lands, massive displacement of Assyrians, marginalization of Assyrians and other minority groups, lack of meaningful consideration of Assyrian objectives in KRG constitution drafting process, security, increased restrictions on the Assyrian right to assemble, and the goal of a Nineveh Plain province.

== Policy ==
Mikhael Benjamin, Sons of Mesopotamia adviser and director of the Nineveh Center for Research and Development (NCRD), in 2014 published a proposal for a Nineveh Plain province following the Islamic State's 2014 invasion of Mosul, that left more than 200,000 Assyrians displaced. In the proposal he writes:

But what is sure at the moment is that they have led to more deterioration in the conditions of the minorities, whether on the humanitarian level whereby all the remaining communities of the area were displaced rendering it completely void of people, or on the security and political level that became more complicated raising questions as to where would all this conflict lead to in their area at a time when it is the minorities who become first victims in all these conflicts something that makes the importance of putting an end to such conditions even more important through neutralizing the conflict there for a limited period of time through the deployment of international peace keeping forces that would impose a safe haven under international protection.

== Dissolution ==
In March 2024, it was announced that the party would dissolve in order to reform with ADM following the election of Yaqoob Yaco as General Secretary. In an official statement on their website, the party detailed how its delegates voted to dissolve in order to reunite with ADM at its General Conference, and expressed enthusiasm for the future of Assyrians in Iraq in the political landscape.
