= Antone AbdulNour =

Judge, merchant, and scholar in Mosul, Ottoman Empire (1849-1914)

Antone Behnam AbdulNour (c. 1849- February 1914) was a judge, a merchant, and a scholar in Mosul during the Ottoman Empire rule.

== Early life ==
Antone AbdulNour was born in about 1849 in the city of Mosul when it was still under the rule of the Ottoman Empire. He was born to a prominent Syriac Orthodox family in Mosul and his father, Behnam AbdulNour, was the owner of significant farmland around Mosul as well as an influential figure in the Syriac Orthodox Church in Mosul.

== Judge ==
In 1890, Antone AbdulNour was appointed a judge in the trade court that was established in Mosul under the Ottoman rule. In 1891, he was awarded a medal of the second degree from the Ottoman Government for his work as a president of the Mosul Administrative Council.

== Career and business ==
Following in his father's footsteps, Antone AbdulNour started working with his father in managing the farmland together with his other brothers, Mikhael, Fathalla, Butte, and Toma. Additionally, he started a trading business and became a merchant for agricultural goods and products. He and his two cousins, Abdulaziz AbdulNour and Gergees AbdulNour, formed a partnership. The merchants of Mosul used to buy agricultural products from the villages around Mosul and trade them with other regions of the Ottoman Empire like Diyarbakir and Syria. Antone and his cousins also traded with other countries like India and some European countries. In addition to this, Antone AbdulNour, was a member of the board of the Ottoman Bank in 1890 and member of the board of the Agriculture Bank in 1892.

== Church affairs ==
As Antone followed his father's footsteps in business, he also followed his footsteps becoming involved in the church affairs in Mosul and helping the church serving its people in Mosul and other regions where the Syriac Orthodox Church existed. He had a good relationship with the church hierarchy and hosted them in his house. When the hierarchy was assumed to be not listing to its people, Antone didn't hesitate to send strong-worded letters to the Syriac Orthodox Patriarch, Ignatius Abded Aloho II demanding actions to resolve church's problems. In addition to his influential position in the church, he collected ancient Syriac manuscripts and many of them ended in the Mingana Collection at the University of Birmingham, England. He also funded the copying of more than 15 old Syriac manuscripts for the church of India. The recipient of those was priest and scholar Mattai Konat. The copyist was the Mattai Bar Paulos bar Na'matallâh of Mosul.

== Death ==
Antone AbdulNour died in February 1914 after short illness.

== See also ==
- ABDULNOUR Family Book
