= Delegation Apostolic of Mesopotamia, Kurdistan, and Armenia =

Papal representative

The Delegation Apostolic of Mesopotamia, Kurdistan, and Armenia was the papal representative who administered the Latin Church diocese of Baghdad and oversaw various Eastern Catholic jurisdictions among the Iraqi Catholic community.
