= Beatrice Ohanessian =

Iraqi-Armenian and American musician

- Born: March 15, 1927; Baghdad, Iraq
- Died: 17 July 2008 (aged 81); Bloomington, Hennepin County, Minnesota, United States
- Education: Juilliard School, Royal Academy of Music
- Occupations: Composer, Musician

Beatrice Ohanessian (March 15, 1927 – July 17, 2008) was an Iraqi-Armenian pianist, notable for being Iraq's first concert pianist and first female composer.

== Biography ==
=== Early life and education ===
Ohanessian was born in Baghdad in 1927 to a well-to-do Armenian family. Her father, born in Persia, had settled in Baghdad after a time in India working with the British. Her mother and two uncles were orphaned survivors of the Armenian genocide. Both parents encouraged her to study music. Ohanessian enrolled in the Institute of Fine Arts, graduating with special mention as a piano major. Upon graduating, she served as an assistant to her Romanian piano professor, Julien Hertz. An Iraqi governmental scholarship allowed her to further her studies at the Royal Academy of Music in London with professor Max Pirani. Four years later, she received her LRAM in piano performance and pedagogy, and a second major in singing. She went on to receive a Fulbright Scholarship to study at the Juilliard School in New York City, which culminated in a debut performance at Carnegie Hall. Her scholarship was then extended for another year, due to the 14 July Revolution in Iraq.

=== Return to Iraq ===
While in the United States, Ohanessian visited her brother, Arsham, and his wife in Minnesota. There, she performed with the Minnesota Orchestra and was encouraged to stay in America. But Ohanessian felt a need to be in Iraq.

Everyone told me I should stay in America, but an inner voice told me I should go back to Iraq and teach my fellow countrymen to love music. Classical music was new to penetrate Iraq and it needed people like me there to nurture it.

Ohanessian was then appointed head of the piano department at Baghdad's Institute of Fine Arts. During summer breaks, she would participate in Master Classes and musical seminars in various countries. In 1961, she became principal concert pianist for the Iraqi National Symphony Orchestra, a post she held for over thirty years. From 1969 to 1972, she taught simultaneously at the University of Minnesota and Macalester College. In 1980, during the Iraq-Iran War, she wrote the first Iraqi Western composition. Her work came to the attention of Iraqi officials, including president Saddam Hussein. When asked what reward she would like for her achievements, she requested a better piano. She was presented with a Steinway grand piano, which she left behind as she settled in the United States after the first Gulf War. The spring before she died, the piano, which had been kept safe by one of her friends in the Iraqi National Symphony, finally arrived in Minnesota, stuffed with several of her evening gowns.

=== Later life and death ===
In 1994, Ohanessian moved permanently to the United States, settling in Minneapolis-Saint Paul, joining her brother, Arsham, and sister, Sita. She again began teaching at the University of Minnesota, Macalester College, as well as the University of St. Thomas. She served as the organist for the Armenian Apostolic Church of St. Paul. Ohanessian died of cancer on July 17, 2008, in Bloomington, at the age of 81.
