= Abdennour Abrous =

Algerian politician (1934–2020)

Abdennour Abrous (born September 15, 1934, in Oujda, Morocco, died April 16, 2020, in New York City), was an Algerian politician. He was a United Nations civil servant who helped organize the global response against apartheid in South Africa in the 1970s and 1980s in his role as assistant director and officer-in-charge of the UN Center Against Apartheid. He also was manager of the UN's Educational and Training Programme for Southern Africa. Abrous retired from the UN in 2003 and resided in New York.

Before joining the UN, Abrous was head of publicity in Addis Ababa for the Organization of African Unity (OAU). He represented the provisional government of independent Algeria in Indonesia during Algeria's struggle for independence, and fought with the National Liberation Front during Algeria's 1954–1962 revolution. His first cousin is Hocine Aït Ahmed, one of the "chefs historiques" of the Algerian war for independence and later a prominent opposition party leader.

While studying for a master's degree at the University of Pennsylvania he played for the 1960-61 championship winning Ukrainian Nationals soccer club.
