= Radio Al-Salam =

Iraqi radio station

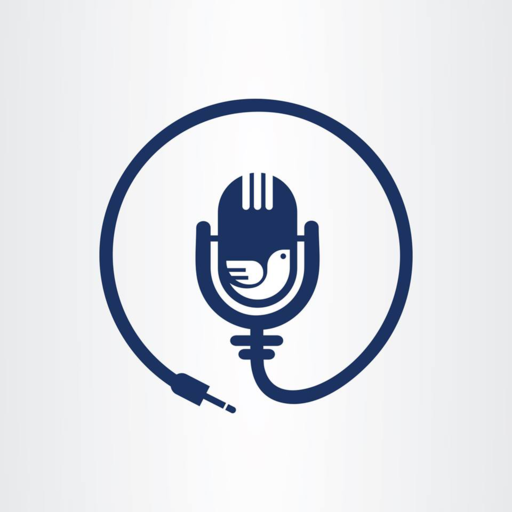
Logo of Radio Al-Salam

Radio Al Salam (Also known as Radio Salam) is an independent, plurireligious and pluriethnic radio station which aims at favoring the expression of refugees and internally-displaced people in the Syrian conflict and the 2014 invasion of the Nineveh Plain by the Islamic State Organization.

== Radio objectives ==
The radio broadcasts music, reports and programs 24/7, in Arabic and Kurdish languages. It seeks to promote dialogue and reconciliation, carrying the voice of refugees, internally displaced people or returned population. It seeks to promote and protect minorities, such as Christians (Assyrians), Yazidis and Syrians. When the radio was created, nearly two million people had found refuge in Iraqi Kurdistan.

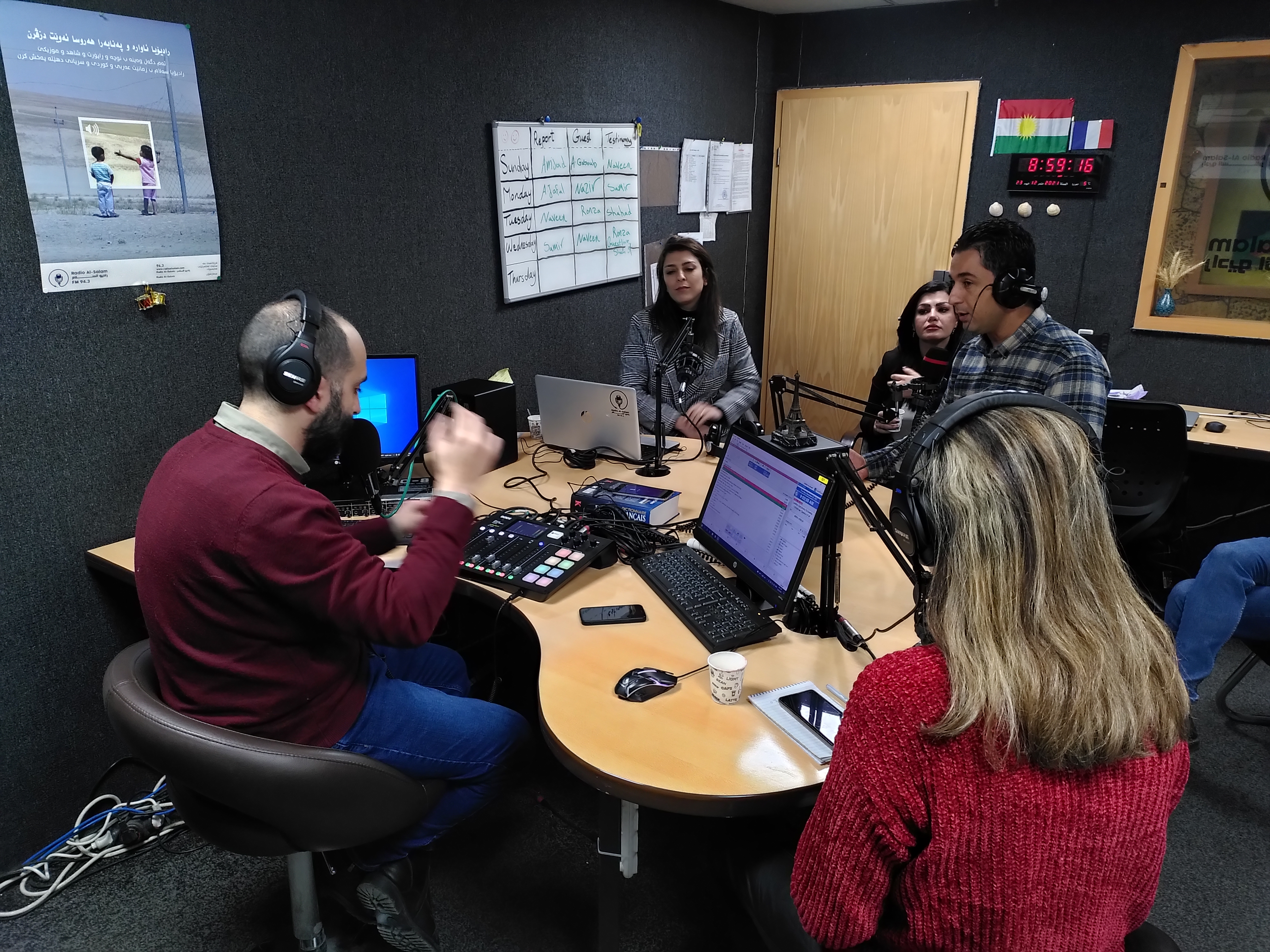
The radio's team in the studio

Its programs are broadcast from Erbil and Dohuk, and accessible in the Governorates of Erbil, Duhok and Nineveh, on its website and via its smartphone application.

== Founders and Partners ==
Radio Al-Salam was founded on the initiative of three French NGOs: La Guilde Européenne du Raid, Radio Sans Frontières and l'Œuvre d'Orient.

It is, or has been, financially supported by the Raoul-Follereau Foundation, the Crisis and Support Center of the French Ministry for Europe and Foreign Affairs, the French Development Agency and the Auvergne Rhône-Alpes region. It is hosted in the offices of the Erbil-based Babylon Media Group.

Since its creation, the radio station has been the subject of multiple reports by French media, including TV5 Monde and RFI. It will also be the subject of a film, directed by Frenchman Xavier de Lauzanne and scheduled for release in 2022.
