= Thabit AbdulNour =

Iraqi Politician, Government Administrator, and Diplomat (1890-1957)

- ثابت عبدالعزيز عبدالنور
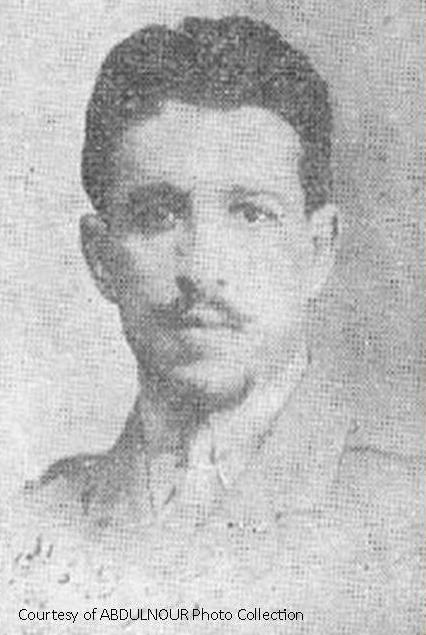

Member of the Iraqi Parliament
- In office 1925–1928
- Monarch: Faisal I of Iraq
- Constituency: Mosul

Member of the Iraqi Parliament
- In office 1930–1931
- Monarch: Faisal I of Iraq
- Constituency: Mosul

Personal details
- Born: Nicola AbdulNour; 1890 Mosul, Mosul vilayet, Ottoman Iraq
- Died: 1957 (aged 66-67) Baghdad, Iraq
- Citizenship: Iraqi
- Profession: Politician, Government Administrator, and Diplomat

Thabit Abdulaziz AbdulNour (Arabic: ثابت عبدالعزيز عبدالنور, 1890 - 1957) was an Iraqi politician, a government administrator, and a diplomat. He was elected twice to the Council of Representatives of Iraq to represent the Christians of Mosul during the monarchy's rule. He served as the first director of oil in the Iraqi government, and as a diplomat in London, Great Britain, Jeddah, Saudi Arabia, and Sanaa, Yemen.

== Early life and education ==
Thabit AbdulNour was born in 1890 in Mosul, the son of Abdulaziz AbdulNour and Ameena Kassab. He studied in the Dominican missionary school and the Royal High School in Mosul. In 1913, he traveled to Istanbul, Turkey to study law.

== Activism ==
AbdulNour returned to Mosul in 1914 and formed the Al-Alam (the Flag) organization to promote Arab nationalism. In 1915, when the Ottoman authorities discovered his activities, they captured him and his cousin, Bashir AbdulNour and put them on trial. At the trial Thabit was found guilty and was ordered to prison but his cousin was released. However, he managed to escape to Syria after short time in prison. He later joined the Arab Revolt, led by Sharif Hussein bin Ali in Al-Hijaz. Later, AbdulNour joined King Faisal, King of Syria in Damascus and participated in the Iraqi Congress that was held in Damascus and called for Prince Abdulla bin Al-Hussein to be installed as King of Iraq. When Faisal was removed by the French Army, AbdulNour left Syria and went to Paris for some time. In 1921, he joined King Faisal again in Iraq, when Faisal was installed as King of Iraq. In 1922, he and others founded the Scientific Institute in Baghdad that tackled the issue of illiteracy in the newly established Kingdom of Iraq by opening classes to educate the population. Within a year, these classes were held in cities all over Iraq. In 1923, AbdulNour was a partner in a big agriculture project to cultivate cotton on a large scale in Iraq in two areas but apparently the project failed due to the technical difficulties of introducing new crops on such a large scale and due to the huge amount of irrigation water required which was not available at that time.

== Politician ==
AbdulNour twice won elections for a parliamentary seat to become a member of Council of Representatives of Iraq (lower chamber of Iraqi parliament) representing Christians of Mosul, first in the parliamentary elections of 1925 and second time in the elections of 1930. AbdulNour was a member of finance and defense committees, and he contributed to many debates in the Iraqi parliament regarding the establishment of laws needed in the newly established Iraqi Kingdom.

== Administrator ==
In 1931, AbdulNour resigned his parliamentary seat and was appointed as the first Director of Oil Affairs in the Ministry of Economics and Communications until 1933. He held the same position again in 1935 until 1936.

== Diplomat ==
In 1933 AbdulNour became a counselor in the Iraqi legation in London. He was appointed in 1934 as Iraqi Oil representative in London. He was appointed Chargé d'affaires in Jeddah in 1938. In January 1939, he went to Yemen as a representative of the Iraqi government and became a close advisor to Imam Yehia, King of Yemen.

== Later years ==
When World War II began in 1939, AbdulNour was on a visit to Germany and refused to return to Iraq, so his government service was terminated. During his stay in Germany, he worked in an Arabic language radio station that was broadcasting propaganda against the British during World War II. He retired in Lausanne, Switzerland, and from 1950 to 1953 he lived in Alexandria, Egypt. AbdulNour returned to Iraq in 1953 and he died in 1957.

== See also ==
- ABDULNOUR Family Book
