= Abdulahad AbdulNour =

Iraqi physician, politician, and humanitarian (1888–1948)

- عبدالاحد عبدالعزيز عبدالنور
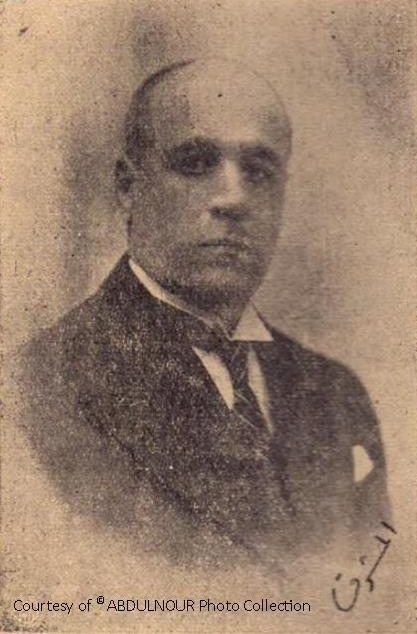

Member of the Iraqi Parliament
- In office 1937–1939
- Monarch: Faisal I of Iraq
- Constituency: Mosul

Member of the Iraqi Parliament
- In office 1947–1948
- Monarch: Faisal I of Iraq
- Constituency: Mosul

Personal details
- Born: Abdulahad AbdulNour; 1888 Mosul, Ottoman Iraq
- Died: 1948 (aged 59–60) Mosul, Kingdom of Iraq
- Citizenship: Iraqi
- Education: American University of Beirut
- Profession: Physician, Politician

Abdulahad Abdulaziz AbdulNour (1888 – 28 February 1948) was an Iraqi physician, politician, and humanitarian. He served as a medical doctor in Mosul before World War I, during the war with the Ottoman Army, and he founded the Royal Hospital of Erbil. He also served in Mosul and various Iraqi cities in public and private medical positions after the war, until he died in 1948. He was elected twice to the Council of Representatives of Iraq to represent the Christians of Mosul during the monarchy rule.

== Early life and education ==
Abdulahad AbdulNour was born in Mosul in 1888 to a prominent Christian Syriac Orthodox family that has lived in Mosul for many generations. He was the third son of eight children born to Abdulaziz AbdulNour and Ameena Kassab. In 1902, at the age of 14, he was sent to finish his high school education in a boarding school in Beirut, Lebanon. After high school, he enrolled in the Medical College at the American University of Beirut (AUB). AbdulNour graduated, at age 23, with a degree in Medicine and Surgery from AUB in 1911. After graduation, he returned to serve in Mosul as a doctor and the first doctor in Mosul to graduate from AUB.

== Career ==
On his return to Mosul, AbdulNour, started working at a newly established government hospital in 1912, then worked at the English mission hospital which the British Church Mission Society had recently opened in Mosul. This hospital closed its doors soon after the declaration of World War I. AbdulNour then joined the Ottoman Health Authority in the Province of Mosul. He was posted to control disease outbreaks in the district of Koysinjaq and town of Ranya. Afterward, he took up a new position in the city of Erbil.

When the war intensified, the Ottoman Army mobilization regulations were implemented in 1914, so AbdulNour joined the Ottoman Army as a military doctor. He was shortly released from military service due to the demands of the people in Erbil for his services. In 1915, AbdulNour rejoined the Ottoman military campaign to fight the Russian army, which had occupied parts of Iran. During his active duty in these campaigns as a commander of the combat care physicians unit, AbdulNour treated and saved lives of soldiers with traumatic injuries.

During the military campaign, AbdulNour was the commander of the military medical unit to combat infectious diseases in the province of Mosul and the adjacent provinces in Iran. His services in the health field were highly valued by the army, the civil administration, and the people, and he was awarded the Red Cross Medal. During this bloody campaign, AbdulNour fell ill on the battlefield and was evacuated to convalesce in a civilian hospital in the city of Sulaymaniyah. He was moved to the city of Kirkuk and finally to the city of Erbil. Eventually, AbdulNour served as a civilian doctor in Erbil until the World War I ended.

After the British army occupied Iraq in 1918, AbdulNour continued his medical responsibilities in Erbil for one more year. During this time, AbdulNour organized healthcare in and around Erbil. He founded what became known as the Royal Hospital of Erbil after the establishment of the monarchy in Iraq and the installation of King Faisal I in 1921. AbdulNour then returned to serve and settle in Mosul. In 1928, he felt a need for further studies and training in England, so he applied to the Ministry of Health for sabbatical leave to obtain special medical experience in different centers of medical excellence in London, England. He traveled to London, enrolled in many courses, and trained in various hospitals. He also participated in medical conferences, observed advances in medical science, and gained useful experience.

In 1922, AbdulNour won election to become a member in the Governing Council of Mosul. In 1932, He declined a nomination for a medical administrative position in Baghdad in favor of continuing to live and serve in Mosul. In 1942, he was appointed Chief Medical Officer in the Governorate of Mosul and was based at the Royal Hospital in Mosul. At the end of 1944, AbdulNour applied for and was granted early retirement by the Ministry of Social Affairs and Health. In retirement, AbdulNour focused on his private medical practice and his medical service to the community of Mosul.

== Political life ==
AbdulNour twice won elections for a parliamentary seat as a member of Council of Representatives of Iraq (the lower chamber of Iraqi parliament), to represent Mosul, first in the parliamentary elections of 1937, and second in the elections of 1947. AbdulNour was a member of finance and defense committees, and he contributed to debates in the Iraqi parliament regarding the establishment of laws needed in the newly established Iraqi Kingdom. AbdulNour was nominated to be a member in the Constitutional Convention in Iraq in 1925 but he didn't win the vote to be a member.

== Mosul Question ==
As the Treaty of Lausanne in 1923 did not resolve the politically disputed territories between Turkey and the British government over the province of Mosul, the issue was commuted for arbitration at the League of Nations in what became known as the "Mosul Question." AbdulNour was a founding and instrumental member of the board of the Committee of Mosul. It was formed to raise awareness and advocate for the rights of the province of Mosul to remain within Iraq, and to join the Province of Baghdad and the Province of Basra, which had already formed the sovereign State of Iraq in 1921. The Committee of Mosul continued its active advocacy until the Anglo-Turkish agreement was signed, and the Province of Mosul joined Baghdad and Basra in the newly established the Kingdom of Iraq.

== Church ==
AbdulNour, was one of the few secular members chosen to represent different churches in the pivotal post WWI Syriac Orthodox Church Synod. This synod was held at the Mor Mattai Monastery in 1930 and it was the 3rd time that it was held in this monastery throughout the long history of Syriac Orthodox Church The Synod was presided over by Syrian Orthodox Patriarch MOR Ignatius Elias III (1917-1933) and moderated by Mor Severus Aphrem Barsoum (1889-1957), Archbishop of Syria and Lebanon (later Patriarch Ignatius Aphrem I Barsoum). The Synod discussed post-war challenges such as the huge numbers of refugees, the large number of destroyed churches in Turkey during Sayfo, issued new canon laws, and sought to organize church affairs. Particular challenges included managing properties and endowments in different emerging nation-states in the Middle East and the globally scattered diaspora. Special attention was given to the situation of the Syriac Orthodox Church in India. In 1945, AbdulNour was instrumental in the successful registration at Mosul's land registry office of cadastral rights to the endowments, properties, and large tracts of land of the villages belonging to the Mor Mattai Monastery.

== Humanitarian ==
Abdulahad volunteered his work and time and donated money to help the refugees that came to Mosul from Turkey after the Armenian genocide and Sayfo between 2014 and 2018. These refugees primarily came from Southern Turkey escaping the killings on the hands of Ottomans army and their allied tribes. The refugees continued to come to Mosul well in the middle of 1920s.

In 1937, AbdulNour volunteered with other doctors in Mosul to treat children for free in a newly established children clinic founded by a committee of prominent women in Mosul. He also gave lectures about children's health care and was a founding member of Iraqi Red Crescent branch in Mosul in 1937.

== Death ==
After a short illness, AbdulNour suffered a sudden heart attack and died at home on 28 February 1948. At his burial mass, he was eulogized by Rabban Bulus Behnam (later the Archbishop of Mosul from 1952 to 1963 and the Archbishop of Baghdad and Basra (1963-1969)).

== See also ==
- ABDULNOUR Family Book
