= Ragheed Ganni =

Martyred Iraqi priest (1972–2007)

Servant of God Ragheed Aziz Ganni ܪܓ̣ܝܕ ܥܙܝܙ ܓܢܝ
- Born: 20 January 1972; Mosul, Iraq
- Died: 3 June 2007 (aged 35); Mosul, Iraq

Ragheed Aziz Ganni (Syriac: ܪܓܝܕ ܥܙܝܙ ܓܢܝ; January 20, 1972 – 3 June 2007) was an Iraqi Chaldean Catholic priest. On 3 June 2007, Trinity Sunday, the Sunday after Pentecost, he was killed along with three subdeacons including his cousin Basman Yousef Daud, Wahid Hanna Isho, and Gassan Isam Bidawed in front of Mosul's Holy Spirit Chaldean Church, where he was a parish priest.

== Biography ==
Ragheed Aziz Ganni was born on 20 January 1972 in the predominantly Sunni city of Mosul, Iraq.

After completing a degree in Civil Engineering at Mosul University in 1996 and fulfilling obligatory military service under the Saddam Hussein regime Ganni entered the seminary in Iraq. In 1996 Ganni's bishop sent him to Rome for further study at the Pontifical University of St. Thomas Aquinas Angelicum where he completed a licentiate in ecumenical theology in 2003. He was ordained a priest in Rome on 13 October 2001 at the Pontifical Urbaniana University.

During his study in Rome he resided at the Pontifical Irish College where he played soccer for the College. The annual showcase 5-a-side tournament played in May among the Scots, English, Beda and Irish Colleges has been named the "Ragheed Cup" in his memory.

Ganni celebrated his first Mass in the Chapel at the Irish College. Today Ganni is one of the nine figures represented in the apse of that chapel where the relics of Saint Oliver Plunkett rest in the altar wrapped in the priestly stole of Ganni. Ganni regularly offered Mass for the Lay Centre at Foyer Unitas which was at the time housed on the grounds of the Irish College.

Fluent in Aramaic, Arabic, Italian, French, and English, Ganni served as a correspondent for the international agency Asia News of the Pontifical Institute for Foreign Missions.

Ganni was finishing his degree in Rome when the Iraq war broke out. Ganni had received permission from his bishop to return to the Angelicum in Rome to work on a doctorate in ecumenism. In a prewar interview he expressed his opposition to the invasion of Iraq fearing that Iraqi Christians would be targeted and persecuted. He looked forward to returning to his native land to serve the Church and people there. He did so after Saddam Hussein was ousted from power in 2003.

== Death ==
On June 3, 2007, Ganni had just finished celebrating the Sunday evening Holy Qurbana and three deacons had recently decided to accompany Ganni because of threats against his life. After the liturgy, he was walking away from the church with Daud as Isho, Bidawed, and Isho's wife followed by car; the group was stopped by unknown armed men. One of the gunmen shouted at Ganni that he had warned him to close the church and demanded to know why he didn't do it. Ganni replied asking "How can I close the house of God?" The gunmen ordered the woman to flee. Then after the gunmen demanded that the four men convert to Islam and they refused, the four were shot down. The car was then set with explosives to deter interference and so that the bodies would remain abandoned. Several hours passed until a police bomb-squad defused the devices, allowing corpses to be recovered.

Thousands of people attended the funeral of the four men in Karemlash, Iraq on 4 June 2007. Ganni was secretary to Paulos Faraj Rahho, the Archbishop of Mosul of the Chaldean Church, Iraq's largest Christian community. Rahho was murdered only nine months after Ganni's death, in the same city of Mosul.

== Veneration ==
The Vatican Secretary of State Tarcisio Bertone telegrammed Ragheed's bishop on behalf of Pope Benedict XVI saying that "Ragheed's sacrifice will inspire in the hearts of all men and women of good will a renewed resolve to reject the ways of hatred and violence, to conquer evil with good and to cooperate in hastening the dawn of reconciliation, justice and peace in Iraq."

The Dicastery for the Causes of Saints has opened Ganni's cause for beatification, and declared him a Servant of God.

== See also ==
- Christian martyrs
- Persecution of Christians
