= Babylon Media Group =

Iraqi-Assyrian media company

Babylon Media
- Founded: 1998; 28 years ago
- Founder: Salwan Zaito; Nashwan Zaito
- Headquarters: Ankawa, Erbil, Iraq
- Products: Television and radio network, event management
- Website: babylon.iq

Babylon Media Group (Arabic: مجموعة بابل الإعلامية) is an Iraqi multi-media company. The company is headquartered in Ankawa, Erbil, in the autonomous Iraqi Kurdistan region. The company was founded in 1998 in the Netherlands by brothers Salwan and Nashwan Zaito, before relocating to Iraq in 2005.

== History ==
The company was founded in 1998 by Assyrian brothers Salwan and Nashwan Zaito, who originate from Zakho in northern Iraq. Living in the Netherlands, the two brothers initially opened their company as a media coverage provider across Europe. In the wake of the US invasion of Iraq, the two decided to move their operations back to Iraq in 2005.

== Operations ==
=== TV, Film, & Radio Integrations ===
The company owns and operates several networks, including Babylon TV, Babylon FM, and Al-Salam Radio. Other channels that they oversee include Gali Kurdistan, Net TV, NRT News, Samara TV, Salahadin TV, Radio Al-Salam, UTV, and Kurdsat TV, each offering unique content that caters to different audiences. In November 2014, the company signed a contract with UAE-based Yahlive to include more channels on their network.

=== Events ===
In 2016, the company hosted the Miss Kurdistan beauty pageant, allocating $350,000 to host the event in Ankawa. The company has also hosted a plethora of events for the government of Iraqi Kurdistan and Kurdish-affiliated organizations.
