= Shlama Foundation =

Non-governmental organization aimed at helping Assyrians in Iraq

- Type: Non-Governmental Organization, 501(c)(3)
- Legal status: Active, founded 2014
- Headquarters: Ankawa, Erbil, Iraq
- President: Noor Matti
- Website: https://www.shlama.org/

The Shlama Foundation is a non-governmental organization and registered non-profit aimed at preserving and bettering the lives of Assyrians in Iraq. The organization was created in 2014 in the wake of ISIS taking over swathes of the Nineveh Plains, and was founded by activists of the Assyrian diaspora in Metro Detroit, including Assyrian radio and television host Noor Matti. The operations of the non-profit primarily occur in these diaspora communities, including in Canada and Australia, while most rebuilding and direct involvement occurs in the north of Iraq. The organization is registered as a federal nonprofit in the United States, while it's also registered as a non-governmental organization in the Republic of Iraq.

== Origins ==
The Shlama Foundation was originally founded in 2014, in response to the activities of ISIS and the Fall of Mosul. The activists who had founded the organization felt that the Assyrian community was overshadowed by other events surrounding ISIS, and so the Shlama Foundation was formed to deliver aid as fast as possible. In an interview with The Detroit News, Noor stated, "When ISIS took over Mosul in 2014, they displaced 120,000 people from their houses...So almost every weekend, I do humanitarian work for the displaced Chaldeans." Former board member John David stated that an additional goal of the Shlama Foundation was to bridge the gap between the Assyrian diaspora and those still living in the Assyrian homeland, as they believe that immigration and permanent residence outside of the region to be an infeasible solution for the prospects of Assyrian survival and autonomy.

By 2017, the group had been able to amass $90,000 with the help of donations. In addition, the Shlama Foundation has collaborated with USAID, American Women for International Understanding, and other organizations to pursue further development of the community post-ISIS.

=== Missions and Values ===
The goals and values of the Shlama Foundation are as follows:

- Community: To maximize community impact by fostering cooperation and building sustainable relations with churches, NGOs, community leaders and other organizations.
- Unity: To embrace the cultural richness of the shared history, language, customs, traditions and beliefs of the Assyrian people (who may also be known as Chaldeans and Syriacs)
- Quality: To improve the quality of life by treating people with compassion, respect and dignity.
- Teamwork: To create supportive environments and work together to achieve common goals.
- Altruism: To act in the best interest of others and promote a culture of volunteerism.
- Connectedness: To bridge the gap between the diaspora and the homeland.
- Transparency: To provide full financial transparency for all projects with videos, pictures, and receipts for all donations.

== Projects ==
The Shlama Foundation has engaged in a multitude of projects since its initial foundation. As of May 2024, the group has successfully completed 271 projects across the north of Iraq, with an estimated budget of more than $2 million. Many of these projects include the repair of churches and homes, providing medical aid to those in need, creating solar energy panels for farms, delivering Christmas gifts to young children, and many more. The projects cover various aspects of Assyrian life in the country, including emergency cases, cultural preservation, housing, economic initiatives, community building, education, and infrastructure.

Other projects that the Shlama Foundation has taken a part of include the Population Database, which keeps track of the number of Assyrians still living in Iraq. As of October 2022, the project estimates that upwards of 140,000 Assyrians remain in Iraq today. Additionally, the organization has started the Shlama Football League, which aims to connect Assyrian youth across their homeland and restore social activities after the impact of ISIS.

== Notability ==
In 2019, the United States Agency for International Development awarded Shlama Foundation a two‑year, $1 million grant as part of a broader package of funding to organisations serving religious and ethnic minorities in the region.

In 2024, the UFC lightweight fighter Beneil Dariush was named the recipient of the Forrest Griffin Community Award. Dariush was selected in part for his longstanding partnership with the Shlama Foundation, having worked with the organisation since 2018 to raise funds and awareness for its mission to support Assyrian communities, and used his platform to conduct events and fundraising activities benefiting the foundation. As the award’s winner, Dariush received a $25,000 donation to the charity of his choice, highlighting the role of the Shlama Foundation in his community engagement efforts.

== See also ==
- Iraqi Christian Relief Council
- Nineveh Plain Protection Units
