= Abdulaziz AbdulNour =

Judge and businessman from Iraq (1850–1927)

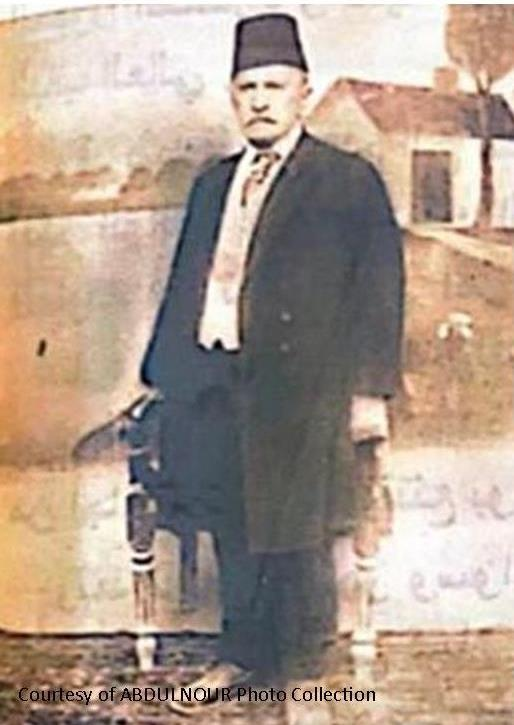
Abdulaziz AbdulNour

Abdulaziz Abdulahad AbdulNour (1850- February 1927) was a judge, a merchant, and a philanthropist in Mosul during the Ottoman Empire rule and the Iraqi Kingdom rule.

== Early life ==
Abdulaziz AbdulNour was born in 1850 to a prominent Syriac Orthodox family in the city of Mosul, when it was still under the rule of the Ottoman Empire. His father, Abdulahad AbdulNour, was the owner of significant farmland around Mosul and an influential figure in the Syriac Orthodox Church in Mosul. His mother Gallo Rassam was the daughter of Archelidos Rassam, who was also an influential figure in the Syriac Orthodox Church in Mosul. His grandfather was a famous copyist of old Syriac manuscripts whose work is included in a major manuscripts collection, the Mingana Collection, at the University of Birmingham, United Kingdom.

== Judge ==
In 1890, Abdulaziz AbdulNour was appointed a judge in the criminal court that was established in Mosul under the Ottoman rule. He was reappointed to the same court in 1894. Later, in 1920, he served in Mosul City Council.

== Career and business ==
Following in his father's footsteps, Abdulaziz AbdulNour started working with his father in managing the farmland. Additionally, he started a trading business and became a merchant for agricultural goods and products. He and his two cousins, Antone AbdulNour and Gergees AbdulNour, formed a partnership. The merchants of Mosul used to buy agricultural products from the villages around Mosul and trade them with other regions of the Ottoman Empire like Diyarbakir and Syria. Abdulaziz and his cousins also traded with other countries like India and some European countries.

== Church affairs ==
As Abdulaziz followed his father's footsteps in business, he also followed his footsteps becoming involved in the church affairs in Mosul and helping the church serving its people in Mosul and other regions where the Syriac Orthodox Church existed. He also funded the construction of a new road to St. Matthew's Monetary northwest of Mosul that was finished by his son, Abdulahad AbdulNour after his death.

== Death ==
Abdulaziz AbdulNour died in February 1927 after short illness.

== See also ==
- ABDULNOUR Family Book
