= Rojava Revolution =

Military and political conflict in northern Syria

- Part of the Syrian civil war, the Kurdish–Turkish conflict, and the war against the Islamic State
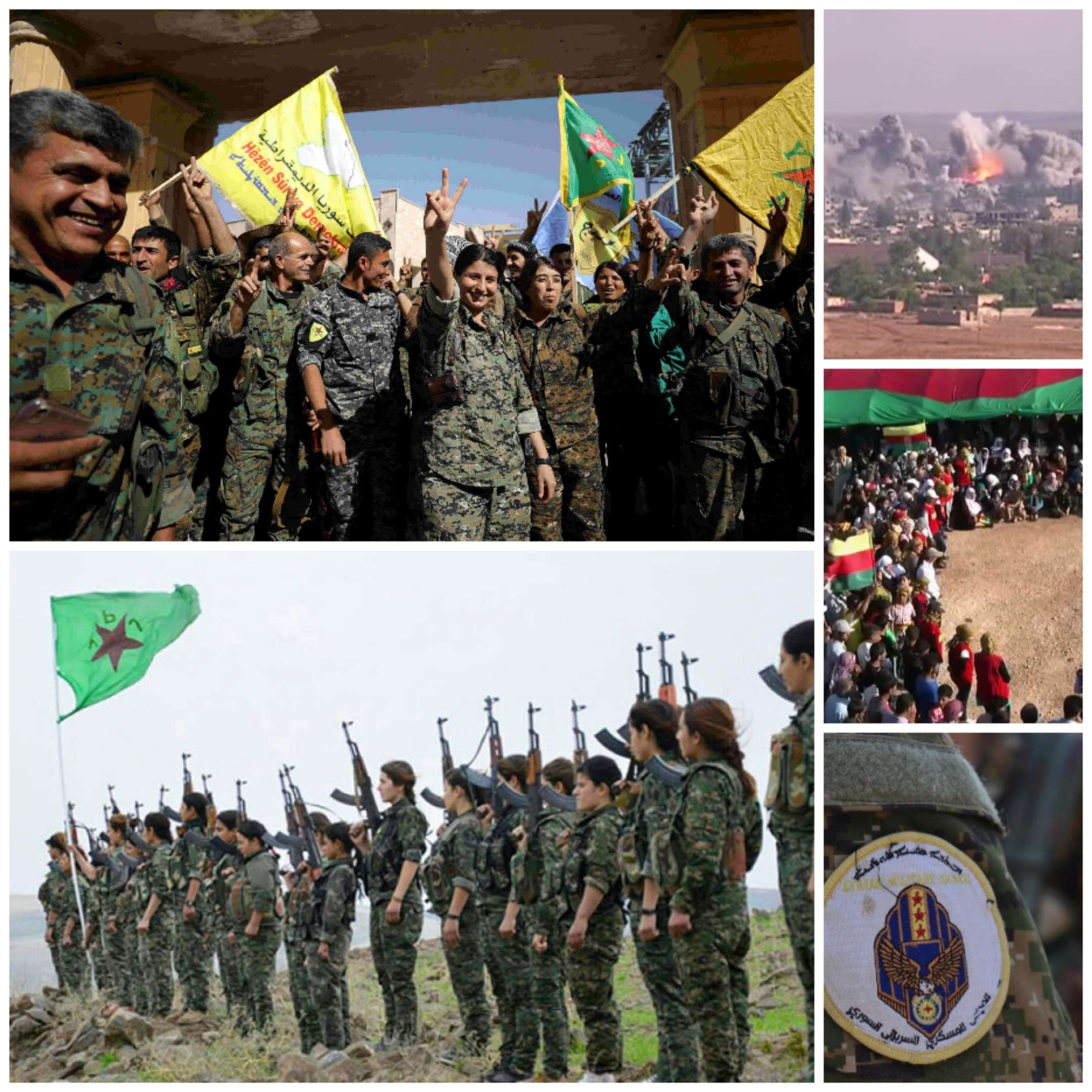
- Clockwise from top left: SDF Victory in the Battle for Raqqa (2017); Coalition airstrike on Islamic State position in Kobanî; PYD supporters at a funeral; Syriac Military Council patch; Kurdish YPJ fighters
Date	19 July 2012 – 20 August 2026 (14 years, 1 month and 1 day)
Location	Al-Hasakah Governorate, Raqqa Governorate, Aleppo Governorate, Deir ez-Zor Governorate, Syria
Result	Syrian transitional government and allied victory; Territorial defeat of the Islamic State of Iraq and Syria; Fall of the Assad regime; End of autonomous Rojava and integration of it into the Syrian transitional government; Integration of the Syrian Democratic Forces into the Syrian Armed Forces

Belligerents
DAANES; PKK; OIR: United States; United Kingdom; Canada; France; Jordan; United Arab Emirates; Bahrain; Morocco; Saudi Arabia; Ba'athist Syria (until 2024) (Note: The Assad regime both clashed and cooperated with the DAANESS during various stages of the conflict); Russia (Note: Russia has cooperated with DAANES during the Northern Aleppo offensive (February 2016) and Second Northern Syria Buffer Zone while clashing with it during the Battle of Khasham) (until 2024)	Turkey; Syrian Interim Government (until 2025); (Syria) Syrian transitional government (2025–2026)	Islamic State	Ba'athist Syria (until 2024); Russia (until 2024)

Units involved
SDF: PYD; YPG; Asayiş; ENKS; Kurdish Front (Note: Ex-Free Syrian Army faction but still Syrian opposition allied brigade); Syriac Union Party; MFS; Sutoro; Khabur Guards; PKK; IFB: MLKP; TKP/ML; MKP; Arab tribesmen: Sharabiyya tribe (Ras al-'Ayn area); Zubayd tribe (Ras al-'Ayn area); Shammar tribe (Ya'rubiyah area); Syrian Arab Armed Forces (surrendered)	Turkish Armed Forces: Turkish Land Forces; Turkish Air Force; Syrian Armed Forces (2024–2026) Turkish-allied; Syrian opposition: SNA (2017–2025); 13th Division; Northern Division; Syrian Turkmen Brigades; Islamic Front; Ahrar al-Sham; Jaysh al-Islam; Ansar al-Sham	(Islamic State) Diwan al-Jund	Syrian Arab Armed Forces (surrendered); Russian Armed Forces

Casualties and losses
14,691 killed; (Ba'athist Syria) 245 killed (Note: 29 killed during Operation Peace Spring; 91 killed during Operation Olive Branch; 125 killed during Battle of al-Hasakah (2015))	(Turkey) 140 killed (Per SOHR) (Note: 2023: 9 killed; 2022: 14 killed; 2021: 10 killed; 11 killed during Operation Peace Spring; 96 killed during Operation Olive Branch); 1,185 killed (Per SOHR) (Note: 2023: 113 killed; 2022: 65 killed; 2021: 30 killed; 355 killed during Operation Peace Spring; 613 killed during Operation Olive Branch)	(Islamic State) 9,158 killed	(Ba'athist Syria) 561 killed (Note: 7 killed during Battle of Qamishli (2021); 11 killed during Qamishli clashes (2018); 68 killed during Battle of Khasham; 77 killed during Battle of al-Hasakah (2016); 22 killed during Battle of Qamishli (2016); 376 killed in 2013)
- 478 civilians killed by SDF, 974 by Turkey, 2,409 by Syrian opposition

The Rojava Revolution, also known as the Rojava conflict, was a political upheaval and military conflict that took place from 2012 to 2026 in northern Syria, known among Kurds as Western Kurdistan or Rojava.

During the Syrian civil war that began in 2011, a Kurdish-dominated coalition led by the Democratic Union Party as well as some other Kurdish, Arab, Assyrian, and Turkmen groups had sought to establish a new constitution for the autonomous region, while military wings and allied militias fought to maintain control of the region. This led to the establishment of the Democratic Autonomous Administration of North and East Syria (DAANES) in 2016.

Supporters of the Kurdish movement viewed the events as a social revolution in which women had played a prominent role both on the battlefield and within the formed political system, alongside the implementation of democratic confederalism, a form of libertarian socialism that emphasized decentralization, gender equality and the need for local governance through direct democracy.

The 2026 northeastern Syria offensive by the Syrian armed forces under the transitional government marked the effective end of the conflict and autonomous Rojava in mid-January 2026, as the SDF and DAANES agreed to integrate into the Syrian army and government.

On August 20, 2026, the DAANES was integrated into the Syrian state, ending the conflict.

== Background ==
=== State discrimination ===
2012 VOA report about the Kurdish situation in Syria

Repression of the Kurds and other ethnic minorities has gone on since the creation of the French Mandate for Syria after the 1916 Sykes–Picot Agreement. The Syrian government never officially acknowledged the existence of the Kurds and in 1962, 120,000 Syrian Kurds were stripped of their citizenship, leaving them stateless. The Kurdish language and culture have also been suppressed. The government attempted to resolve these issues in 2011 by granting all Kurds citizenship, but only an estimated 6,000 out of 150,000 stateless Kurds have been given nationality and most discriminatory regulations, including the ban on teaching Kurdish, are still on the books. Due to the Syrian Civil War, which began in 2011, the government is no longer in a position to enforce these laws.

=== Qamishli riots ===
In 2004, riots broke out against the government in the northeastern city of Qamishli. During a soccer match between a local Kurdish team and a visiting Arab team from Deir ez-Zor, some Arab fans brandished portraits of Saddam Hussein, who killed tens of thousands of Kurds in Southern Kurdistan during the Anfal campaign in the 1980s. Tensions quickly escalated into open protests, with Kurds raising their flag and taking to the streets to demand cultural and political rights. Security forces fired into the crowd, killing six Kurds, including three children. Protesters went on to burn down the Ba'ath Party's local office. At least 30 and as many as 100 Kurds were killed by the government before the protests were quelled. Thousands of Kurds then fled to Iraq, where a refugee camp was established. Occasional clashes between Kurdish protesters and government forces occurred in the following years.

Mashouq al-Khaznawi, a very influential Kurdish sheikh, was killed in 2005 due to his increasing activism which began during the 2004 Qamishli uprisings. He was described as the "center" of the 2004 uprisings and was considered a threat by the Syrian government, who killed him and sparked outrage among Kurds.

== Establishment of autonomy ==
=== Syrian Civil War ===
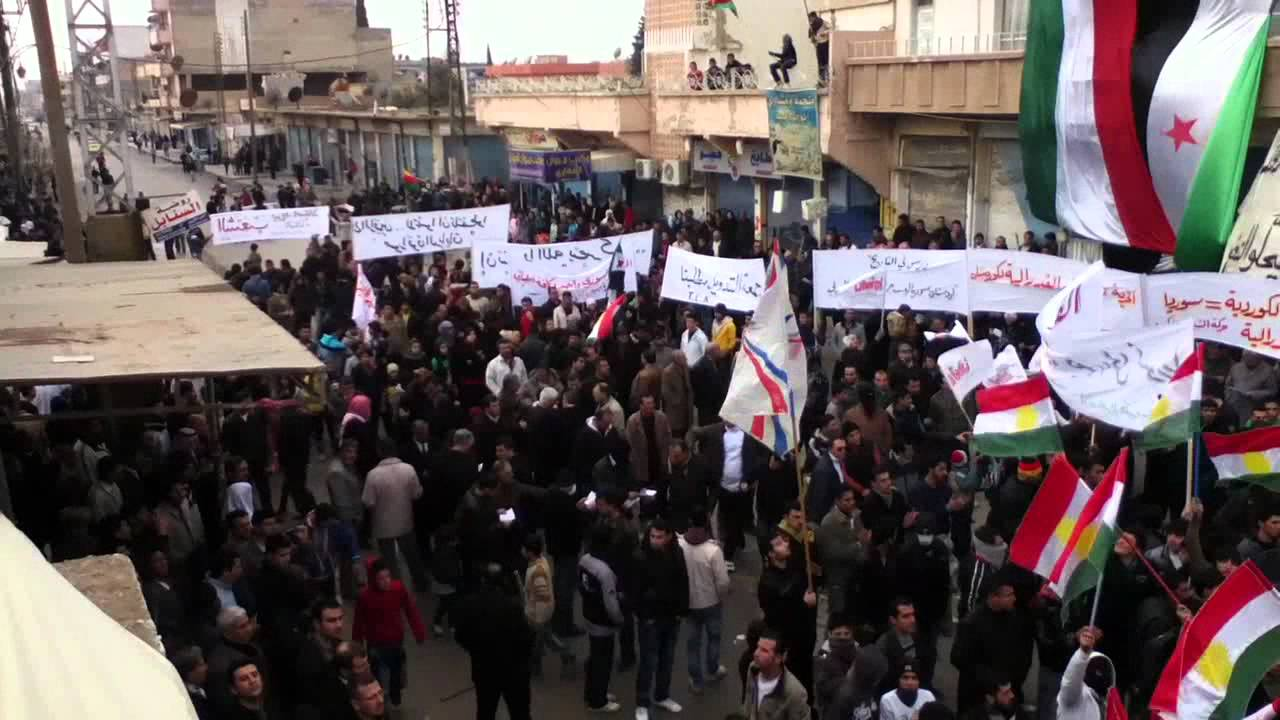
Kurds, Assyrians, and Arabs demonstrate against the Ba'athist regime in Qamishli, 6 January 2012

In 2011, the Arab Spring spread to Syria. In an echo of the Tunisian revolution, Syrian citizen Hasan Ali Akleh soaked himself in gasoline and set himself on fire in the northern city of Al-Hasakah. This inspired activists to call for a "Day of Rage", which was sparsely attended, mostly because of fear of repression from the Syrian government. Days later, however, protests again took place, this time in response to the police beating of a shopkeeper.

Smaller protests continued, and on 7 March 2011, thirteen political prisoners went on hunger strike, and momentum began to grow against the Assad government. Three days later dozens of Syrian Kurds went on hunger strike in solidarity. On 12 March, major protests took place in Qamishli and Al-Hasakah to both protest the Assad government and commemorate Kurdish Martyrs Day.

Protests grew over the months of March and April 2011. The Assad government attempted to appease Kurds by promising to grant citizenship to thousands of Kurds, who until that time had been stripped of any legal status. By the summer, protests had only intensified, as did violent crackdowns by the Syrian government.

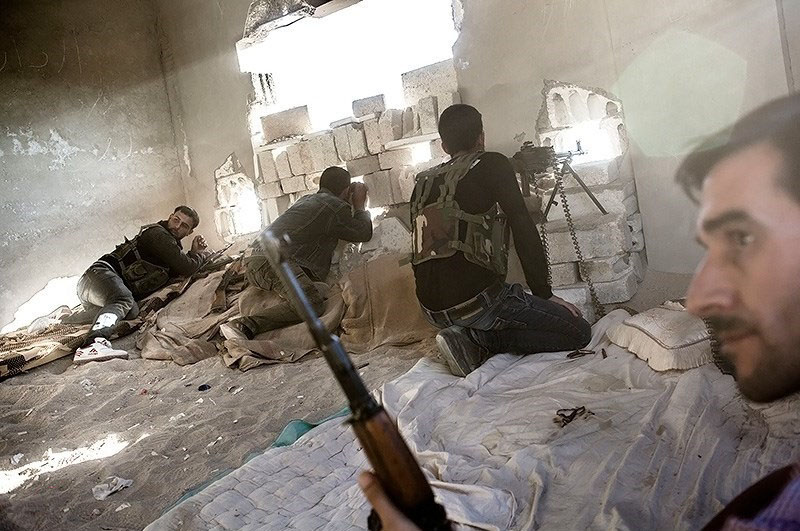
Ras al-Ayn and a series of other towns in northern Syria were partially captured by the YPG in 2012 (Battle of Ras al-Ayn depicted).

In August, a coalition of opposition groups formed the Syrian National Council in hopes of creating a democratic, pluralistic alternative to the Assad government. But internal fighting and disagreement over politics and inclusion plagued the group from its beginnings. In the fall of 2011 the popular uprising escalated to an armed conflict. The Free Syrian Army (FSA) began to coalesce and armed insurrection spread, largely across central and southern Syria.

=== Kurdish parties negotiate ===
The National Movement of Kurdish Parties in Syria, a coalition of Syria's 12 Kurdish parties, boycotted a Syrian opposition summit in Antalya, Turkey on 31 May 2011, stating that "any such meeting held in Turkey can only be a detriment to the Kurds in Syria, because Turkey is against the aspirations of the Kurds".

During the August summit in Istanbul, which led to the creation of the Syrian National Council, only two of the parties in the National Movement of Kurdish Parties in Syria, the Kurdish Union Party and the Kurdish Freedom Party, attended the summit.

Anti-government protests had been ongoing in the Kurdish-inhabited areas of Syria since March 2011, as part of the wider Syrian uprising, but clashes started after the opposition Kurdish Democratic Union Party (PYD) and Kurdish National Council (KNC) signed a seven-point agreement on 11 June 2012 in Erbil under the auspice of Iraqi Kurdistan president Massoud Barzani. This agreement, however, failed to be implemented and so a new cooperation agreement between the two sides was signed on 12 July which saw the creation of the Kurdish Supreme Committee as a governing body of all Kurdish-controlled territories in Syria.

=== YPG claims territory ===
The People's Protection Units (YPG) entered the conflict by capturing the city of Kobanî on 19 July 2012, followed by the capture of Amuda and Efrîn on 20 July. The cities fell without any major clashes, as Syrian security forces withdrew without any significant resistance. The Syrian Army pulled out to fight elsewhere. The KNC and PYD then formed a joint leadership council to run the captured cities.

The YPG forces continued with their advancement and on 21 July captured Al-Malikiyah (Kurdish: Dêrika Hemko), which lies 10 kilometers from the Turkish border. The forces at the time also intended to capture Qamishli, the largest Syrian city with a Kurdish majority. On the same day, the Syrian government attacked a patrol of Kurdish YPG members and wounded one fighter. The next day it was reported that Kurdish forces were still fighting for Al-Malikiyah, where one young Kurdish activist was killed after government security forces opened fire on protesters. The YPG also took control over the towns of Ra's al-'Ayn (Kurdish: Serê Kaniyê) and Al-Darbasiyah (Kurdish: Dirbêsiyê), after the security and political units withdrew from these areas, following an ultimatum issued by the Kurds. On the same day, clashes erupted in Qamishli between YPG and government forces in which one Kurdish fighter was killed and two were wounded along with one government official.

On 24 July, the PYD announced that Syrian security forces had withdrawn from the small Kurdish city of 16,000 of Al-Ma'bada (Kurdish: Girkê Legê), between Al-Malikiyah and the Turkish borders. The YPG forces then took control of all government institutions.

=== Autonomous government established ===
On 1 August 2012, state security forces on the periphery of the country were pulled into the intensifying battle taking place in Aleppo. During this large withdrawal from the north, the YPG took control of at least parts of Qamishli, Efrin, Amude, Dirbesiye and Kobanî with very little conflict or casualties.

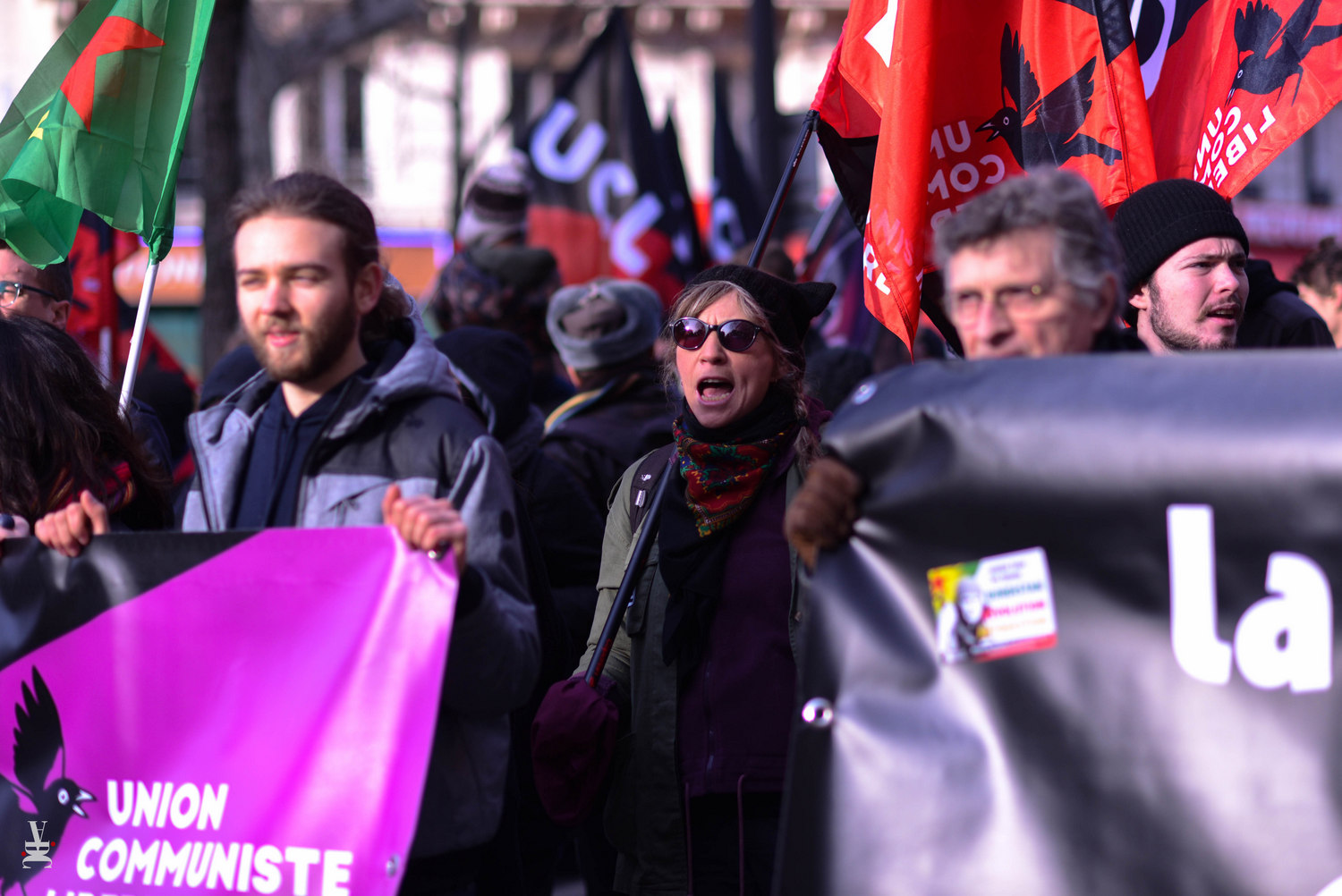
Anarchists and Kurds marching in France in support of Rojava

On 2 August 2012, the National Coordination Committee for Democratic Change announced that most Kurdish-majority cities in Syria, except Qamishli and Hasaka, were no longer controlled by government forces and were now being governed by Kurdish political parties. In Qamishli, government military and police forces remained in their barracks and administration officials in the city allowed the Kurdish flag to be raised.

After months of de facto rule, the PYD officially announced its regional autonomy on 9 January 2014. Elections were held, popular assemblies established and the Constitution of Rojava was approved. Since then, residents organized local assemblies, reopened schools, established community centers, and helped push back the Islamic State of Iraq and the Levant (ISIL) to gain control of almost all land in Syria east of the Euphrates river. They see their model of grassroots democracy as one that can be implemented throughout Syria in the future.

== Social revolution ==
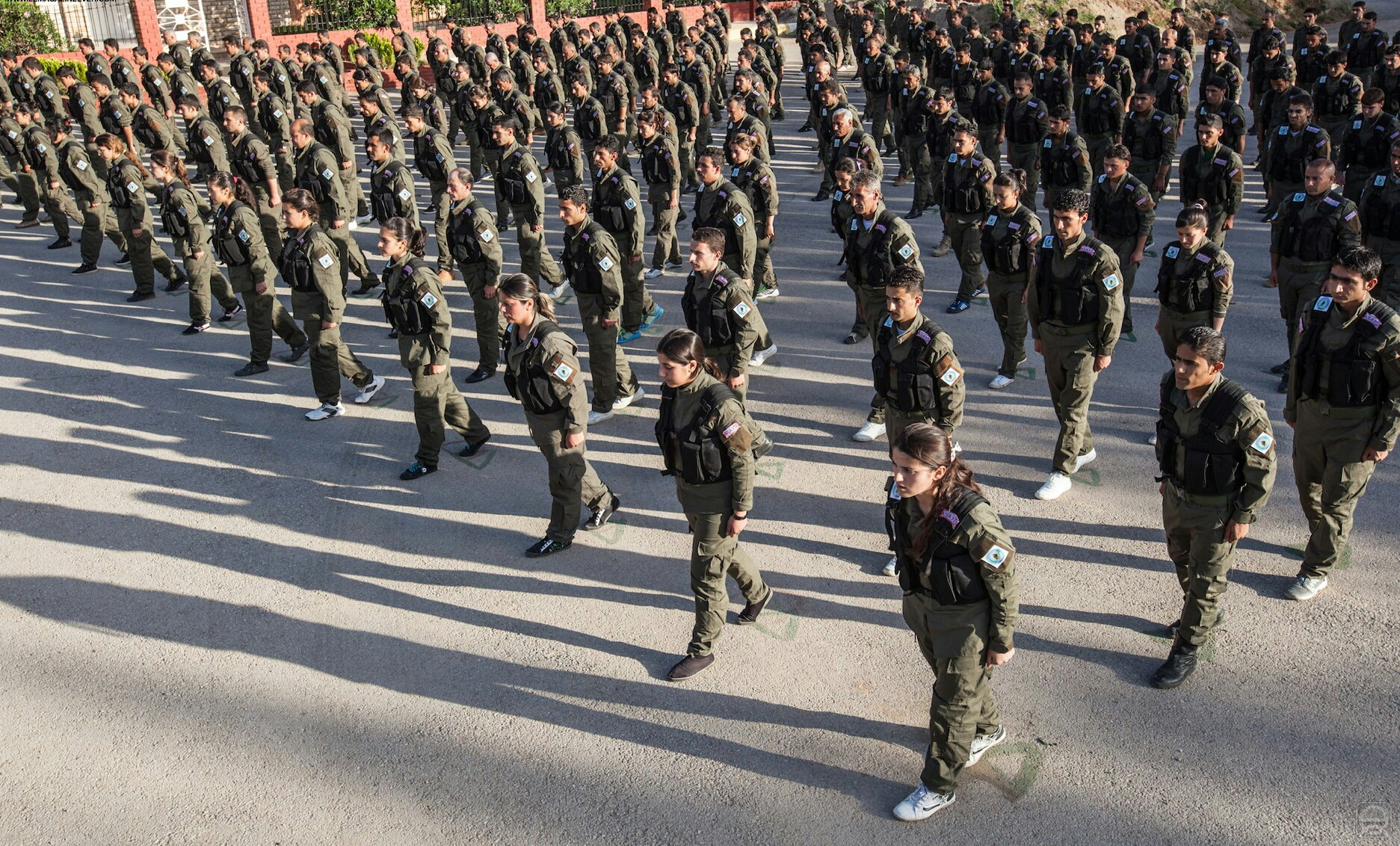
Male and female members of the Asayish police force

After declaring autonomy, grassroots organizers, politicians and other community members have radically changed the social and political make-up of the area. The extreme laws restricting independent political organizing, women's freedom, religious and cultural expression and the discriminatory policies carried out by the Assad government have been superseded. In their place, a Constitution of Rojava guaranteeing the cultural, religious and political freedom of all people has been established. The constitution also explicitly states the equal rights and freedom of women and also "mandates public institutions to work towards the elimination of gender discrimination".

The political and social changes taking place in Rojava have in large part been inspired by the libertarian socialist politics of Kurdish leader Abdullah Öcalan.

=== Cooperative economy ===
The Rojava economy is a blend of private companies, the autonomous administration and worker cooperatives. Since the revolution, efforts have been made to transition the economy to one of self-sufficiency based on worker and producer cooperatives. This transition faces the major obstacles of ongoing conflict and an embargo from all neighboring countries: Turkey, Iraq, Iran, and the various forces controlling nearby areas of Syria. This has forced people to rely almost exclusively on diesel-run generators for electricity. Additionally, strong emphasis is being placed on businesses that can bring about self-sufficiency to the region.

There were at first no direct or indirect taxes on people or businesses in the region; Instead the administration funded itself mainly through the sale of oil and other natural resources and tariffs on border commerce (which is clandestine because of the embargo). However, in July 2017, it was reported that the administration in the Jazira Region had started to collect income tax to provide for public services in the region. There are partnerships that have been created between private companies and the administration. The administration also funds the school system and distributes bread to all citizens at a below-market rate.

The Movement for a Democratic Society Economic Committee has been helping businesses move towards a "community economy" based on worker cooperatives and self-sufficiency.

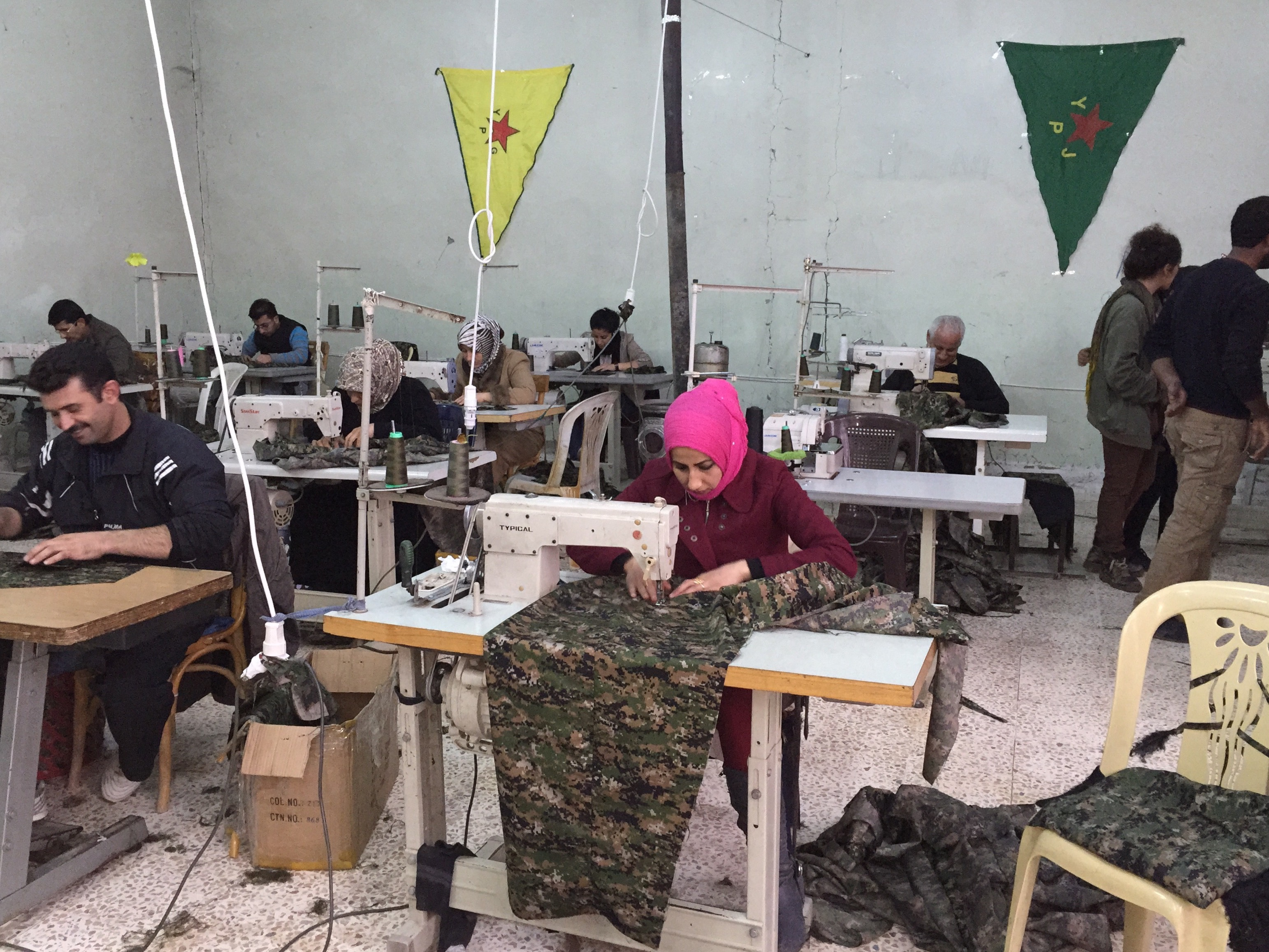
Syrians sewing garments in a worker cooperative

Other cooperatives involve bottled mineral water, construction, factories, fuel stations, generators, livestock, oil, pistachio and roasted seeds, and public markets.

Additionally there are several agricultural communes with families collectively working the land.

According to the region's "Ministry of Economics", by 2015, approximately three-quarters of all property had been placed under community ownership and a third of production had been transferred to direct management by workers' councils.

=== Direct democracy ===
The Rojava Cantons are governed through a combination of district and civil councils. District councils consist of 300 members as well as two elected co-presidents, one man and one woman. District councils decide and carry out administrative and economic duties such as garbage collection, land distribution and cooperative enterprises. Civil councils exist to promote social and political rights in the community.

=== Ethnic minority rights ===
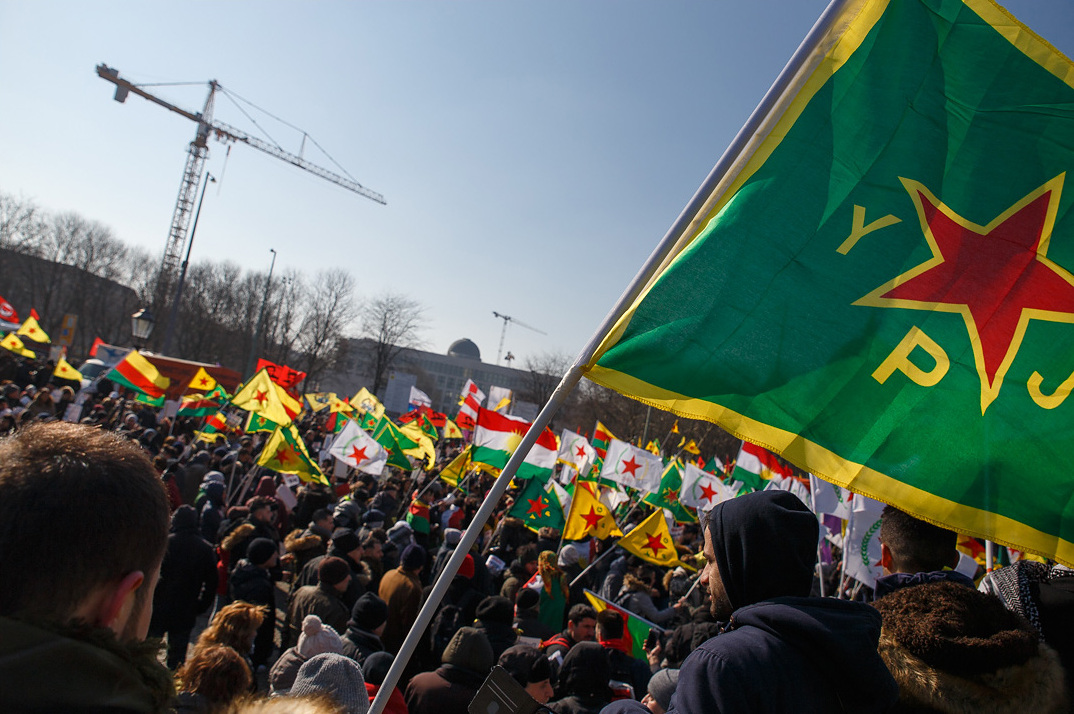
Protest in support of Rojava and the Rojava revolution against genocide in Berlin, Germany

Closely related to religious freedom and the protection of religious minorities is the protection of ethnic minorities. Kurds now have the right to study their language freely, as do Assyrians. For the first time, a Kurdish curriculum has been introduced to the public school system.

Residents are also now free to express their culture freely. Culture and music centers have formed, hosting dance classes, music lessons and choir practice.

In some areas, in addition to the gender quota for councils, there is also an ethnic minority quota.

There has been, however, numerous instances of discrimination toward Assyrians, including policies of seizing the property of Assyrians who had to flee due to conflict, and numerous instances of attacks against the Assyrian minority. Kurdish authorities have also shut down privately run Assyrian schools ostensibly to protect students from "exorbitant tuition costs".

=== Restorative justice ===
Rojava's criminal justice system incorporates principles of restorative justice. Reconciliation Committees have replaced the Syrian government court system in several cities. Committees are representative of the ethnic diversity in their respective area. For example, the committee in Tal Abyad has Arabs, Kurds, Turkmen and Armenians.

=== Women's rights ===
==== Women's revolution in Rojava ====
Rojava is famous for its attempt at overcoming gender inequality and improving women's rights. In the Rojava Revolution, women's participation has achieved a lot of media attention in recent years. A lot of Kurdish women bound their power, gathered their weapons, and served in the mobile company of the Women's Protection Units (YPJ) on the front line in Syria. The revolution in Rojava is mainly caused by the underlying dominant ideology, namely a secular egalitarian ideology. Influenced by the ideology of Abdullah Öcalan, women have taken up their arms and have been fighting for a liberated Kurdistan. Ideologies that include an active fight for gender equality lead to the equal inclusion of women in military positions.

Within the Kurdish forces, and especially regarding its leadership positions, there is an unprecedentedly high prevalence of female fighters. The YPJ is a unique case where women embody a substantial part of the overall military force. The traditional belief, that combat is a male-dominated area and women simply are victims of that fact, is thereby compromised.

==== Jineology ====
A strong political ideology, namely the Democratic Autonomy concept of Abdullah Öcalan, has had a major impact on female empowerment. Öcalan, political activist and founder of the PKK, has the belief that a society needs to make decisions with consent from all members. A nation should be based on this kind of democracy, as well as ecology and women's freedom. Öcalan brought the concept of democratic confederalism to life, which encouraged a move away from patriarchal nationalism. Within this concept, feminism, specifically jineology (the science of women), is central to the social revolution taking place in Rojava. The Democratic Autonomy concept has been modified to the ongoing conflict in Syria. All YPG and YPJ fighters and Asayish have the study of jineology as part of their training, and it is also taught in community centers. In 2017, the University of Rojava established the department of Jineology integrated in Languages and Social Studies Faculty. The aim was to "teach the reality of life and women and redefine them and achieve changes in the mentality of the society".

==== Legal revolution ====
Aside from the military victories, Rojava is the witness of a legal revolution. Since the war broke out there have been multiple legal changes regarding women's rights. In the Social Contract of the Autonomous Regions of Kobane, Jazira and Afrin, formulated in 2014, it is stated that women and men have the same rights. Much of the focus of the revolution has been on addressing the extreme levels of violence which women in the area have endured, as well as increasing women's leadership in all political institutions. To illustrate, the authority of Rojava has come up with an initiative to install a 40% quota representation of women in every organization and institution. This has the consequence that in every layer of government, from a local organization to the parliament, women must be assigned as vice presidents or co-presidents. Also, efforts are being made to reduce cases of underage marriage, polygamy and honor killings, both socially as well as through legislation forbidding these practices.

==== Women's Protection Unit (YPJ) ====
In the 1980s, political organizations began recruiting women for their political and military ranks. An example of such a political organization was the Kurdish Workers Party, the PKK. The extent to which women participate in the PKK and the YPG demonstrates the outstanding roles they have had in the battle with ISIS. The YPG can be seen as the National Liberation Movement and the women from the YPJ have been fighting side by side with them. Both forces, YPJ and YPG, are under the control and command of the Democratic Union Party (PYD). Their combaters are trained both militarily and educationally, as they are introduced to the political thought of Öcalan and jineology. The Rojava Model perceives women as revolutionary operators who fight for improving democratic values. Women not only stimulate emancipation in society but further tackle the system which allows men to have internalized hegemony over women. Therefore, women are highly visible as female fighters in the YPJ against ISIS.

==== Women's houses ====
In every town and village under YPG control, a women's house is established. These are community centers run by women, providing services to survivors of domestic violence, sexual assault and other forms of harm. These services include counseling, family mediation, legal support, and coordinating safe houses for women and children. Classes on economic independence and social empowerment programs are also held at women's houses.

=== Religious freedom ===
The right to religious expression is also safeguarded in the constitution. This, as well as the extreme hostility towards religious minorities in Islamist controlled areas, has led to a large migration of religious minorities to Rojava.

== Relations and conflicts ==
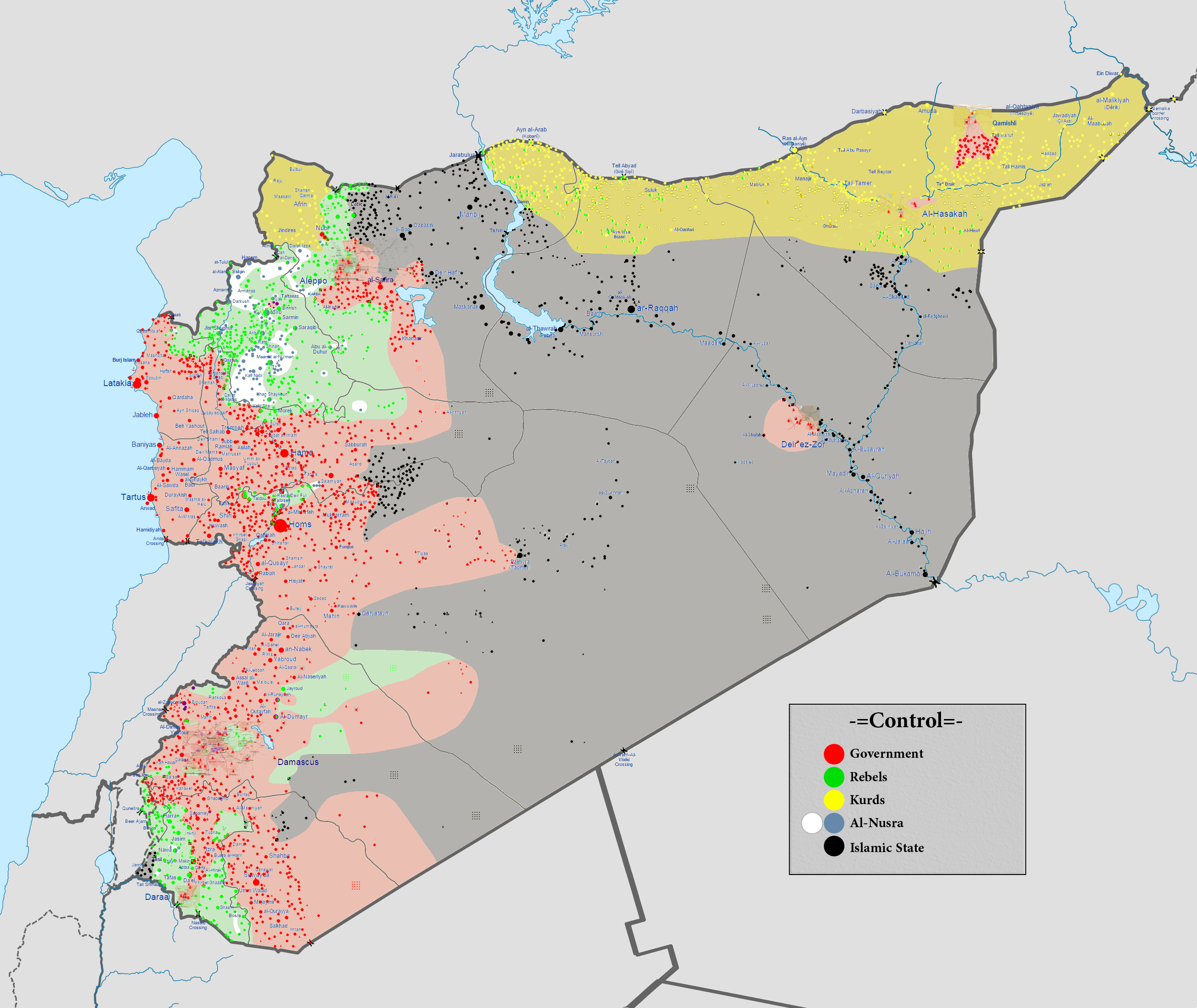
Military situation in December 2015

There are four major forces involved in the Rojava revolution. The People's Protection Units are working with the PYD and other political parties to establish self-rule in Rojava. Syrian government forces still maintain rule in some areas of Rojava under the leadership of the Assad government. A collection of Sunni Islamist forces, the largest being the Islamic State of Iraq and the Levant (ISIL), fought to rule the region by way of Islamic fundamentalism. Finally, there were several militias under the general banner of the Free Syrian Army whose intentions and alliances have differed and shifted over time.

=== Rojava–Syrian government relations and conflicts ===
While conflict between the YPG and the Syrian government has not been as active as fighting against Islamist forces, there have been several conflicts between the two forces. Territory once controlled by the Syrian government in both Qamishli and al-Hasakah has been taken over by YPG forces. At the end of April 2016, clashes erupted between government forces and YPG fighters for control of Qamishli.

As of the beginning of August 2016, YPG fighters controlled two-thirds of the northeastern city of al-Hasakah, while pro-government militias controlled the remainder. On 17 August 2016, heavy clashes broke out between YPG fighters and the pro-government militias, resulting in the deaths of four civilians, four Kurdish fighters, and three government loyalists. On 18 August, Syrian government aircraft bombed YPG positions in Hasakah, including three YPG checkpoints and three YPG bases. Syrian Kurds had recently demanded that the pro-government National Defense Forces militia disband in al-Hasakah. A government source told the AFP that the air strikes were "a message to the Kurds that they should stop this sort of demand that constitutes an affront to national sovereignty". Another possible factor behind the fighting may have been the recent thaw in Turkish–Russian relations that began in July 2016; Russia, a key ally of the Syrian government, had previously been supporting Syrian Kurdish forces as a means to apply pressure to Turkey. After the recent territorial defeat of ISIL in Syria and Iraq and improvements in the Turkish–Russian relationship, it is possible that Russia and its allies began to view a strong YPG as increasingly less useful. In response to the attacks by the Syrian aircraft on Kurdish positions near al-Hasakah, the United States scrambled planes over the city in order to deter further attacks. By 22 August, Syrian government troops, Hezbollah fighters, and members of the Iranian paramilitary Basij militia had become involved in the fighting against Kurdish forces in al-Hasakah.

In October 2023, in response to a series drone strikes on U.S. bases in Syria and Iraq, the Kurdish forces fought Syrian militias. 3 Kurdish militiamen and 19 Syrian militiamen were killed while 20 Syrian militiamen were injured.

In the context of the 2024 opposition offensives in Syria and the downfall of the Assad regime, SDF forces took part in the battle of Aleppo, expanding their control of the Sheikh Maqsood area, as well as taking territory across the Euphrates river, seizing Deir ez-Zor.

=== Internal relations and conflicts in Rojava ===
On 28 December 2012, Syrian government forces opened fire on pro-FSA demonstrators in al-Hasakah city, killing and wounding several individuals. Arab tribes in the area attacked YPG positions in the city in reprisal, stating the Kurdish fighters were collaborating with the government. Clashes broke out, and three Arabs were killed, though it was not clear whether they were killed by YPG forces or nearby government troops. Demonstrations were organised by various Kurdish groups throughout northeastern Syria in late December as well. PYD supporters drove vehicles at low speeds through a KNC demonstration in Qamishli, raising tensions between the two groups.

From 2 to 4 January, PYD-led demonstrators staged protests in the al-Antariyah neighbourhood of Qamishli, demanding "freedom and democracy" for both Kurds and Syrians. Many activists camped out on site. On 4 January, approximately 10,000 people were participating in the rallies, which also included smaller numbers of supporters of other Kurdish parties, such as the KNC, which staged a rally in the Munir Habib neighbourhood. PYD organisers had planned for 100,000 people to participate, but such support did not materialise. The demonstrations were concurrent with rallies conducted across the country by the Arab opposition, though Kurdish parties did not use the same slogans as the Arabs, and also did not the same slogans amongst their own parties. Kurds also demonstrated in several other towns, but not across the entire Kurdish region.

Meanwhile, several armed incidents occurred between the dominant PYD-YPG and other Kurdish parties in the region, particularly the Kurdish Union ("Yekîtî") Party, part of a Kurdish political coalition called the Kurdish Democratic Political Union formed on 15 December 2012, which excludes the PYD. On 3 January, PYD gunmen staged a drive-by shooting on a Yekîtî office in Qamishli. Armed Yekîtî members returned fire, injuring one PYD member. The same day, armed clashes broke out between YPG fighters and members of the newly formed Jiwan Qatna Battalion of Yekîtî in ad-Darbasiyah. Four Yekîtî members were abducted by the YPG, who said they were affiliated with Islamist groups, though Yekîtî activists stated that the PYD wanted to prevent other Kurdish groups from arming themselves. Following demonstrations in the town demanding their release and an intervention by the KNC, the four men were released by the end of the day. On 11 January, YPG forces raided an empty Yekîtî training ground near Ali Faru which had been built in early January, tearing down both the Kurdish and FSA flags that had been flying at the base. Though PYD members defended the raid by saying that the flags could have attracted government airstrikes, Yekîtî condemned the action.

Military situation in August 2018

On 31 January, Kamal Mustafa Hanan, editor-in-chief of Newroz (a Kurdish-language journal) and a former Yekîtî politician, was fatally shot in the Ashrafiyah district of Aleppo. It was not clear if he was the victim of a stray bullet or of a politically motivated assassination. Yekîtî organised a funeral procession in the town of Afrin in the Kurdish-held northwest corner of Aleppo Province on 1 February, which members of both the PYD and KNC attended. Also on 1 February, Kurds staged demonstrations in several towns and villages across West Kurdistan concurrent with opposition demonstrations elsewhere in the country. The demonstrations were organised by various Kurdish groups, including the PYD and KNC. Demonstrators from the KNC demanded an end to fighting in Ras al-Ayn and the withdrawal of armed groups from the town, while PYD demonstrators stressed solidarity with their YPG units and the Kurdish Supreme Council.

From 2 to 5 February, YPG forces blockaded the village of Kahf al-Assad (Kurdish: Banê Şikeftê), inhabited by members of the Kurdish Kherikan tribe, after being fired upon by unknown gunmen in the village. YPG checkpoints were also established around other Kherikan villages. The Kherikan are traditionally supporters of the Massoud Barzani government of Iraqi Kurdistan, and as oppose the PYD. The blockade was the third time in two years that hostilities had broken out between the PYD/YPG and locals from Kahf al-Assad.

On 7 February, YPG members kidnapped three members of the opposition Azadî party in Ayn al-Arab.

On 22 February, Osman Baydemir, mayor of the city of Diyarbakır in Turkey, announced the initiation of a one-month humanitarian aid programme in which his city—along with the surrounding districts of Bağlar, Yenişehir, Kayapınar, and Sur—would provide food assistance to Kurdish areas in Syria affected by the war, which had received little of the humanitarian aid that other regions of Syria had received.

On 11 April 2016, PYD supporters attacked the offices of the Kurdish National Council and the Kurdistan Democratic Party of Syria in Derbessiye and Qamishli. The head of the Kurdish National Council told Turkey's TRT World channel the "PYD's oppressive attitude in Syria is forcing Kurds to leave the region".

On 16 January 2017, more than 270 Syrian Kurdish activists signed an appeal calling for unity talks between the main Syrian Kurdish parties. In response, the Movement for a Democratic Society led by the PYD stated that they welcome unity and called on the Kurdish National Council to participate in federal project. The KNC led by the KDP-S, in response, demanded the release its political prisoners detained in Rojava. The KNC has rejected the federalism project launched by the Syrian Democratic Council and stated that it will participate in the peace talks in Astana, Kazakhstan, with Turkey and Russia. The Kurdish National Alliance in Syria, part of the SDC also welcomed the proposal of unity.

On 3 February 2017, amidst clashes between the KDP-S-affiliated Peshmerga group and the Sinjar Resistance Units in Sinjar, a KNC office was burned in Qamishli and another attacked in Dirbêsiyê. The KNC said the pro-PYD youth group the Ciwanen Soresger was perpetrating the attacks. However, the perpetrators were reportedly arrested by the Asayish.

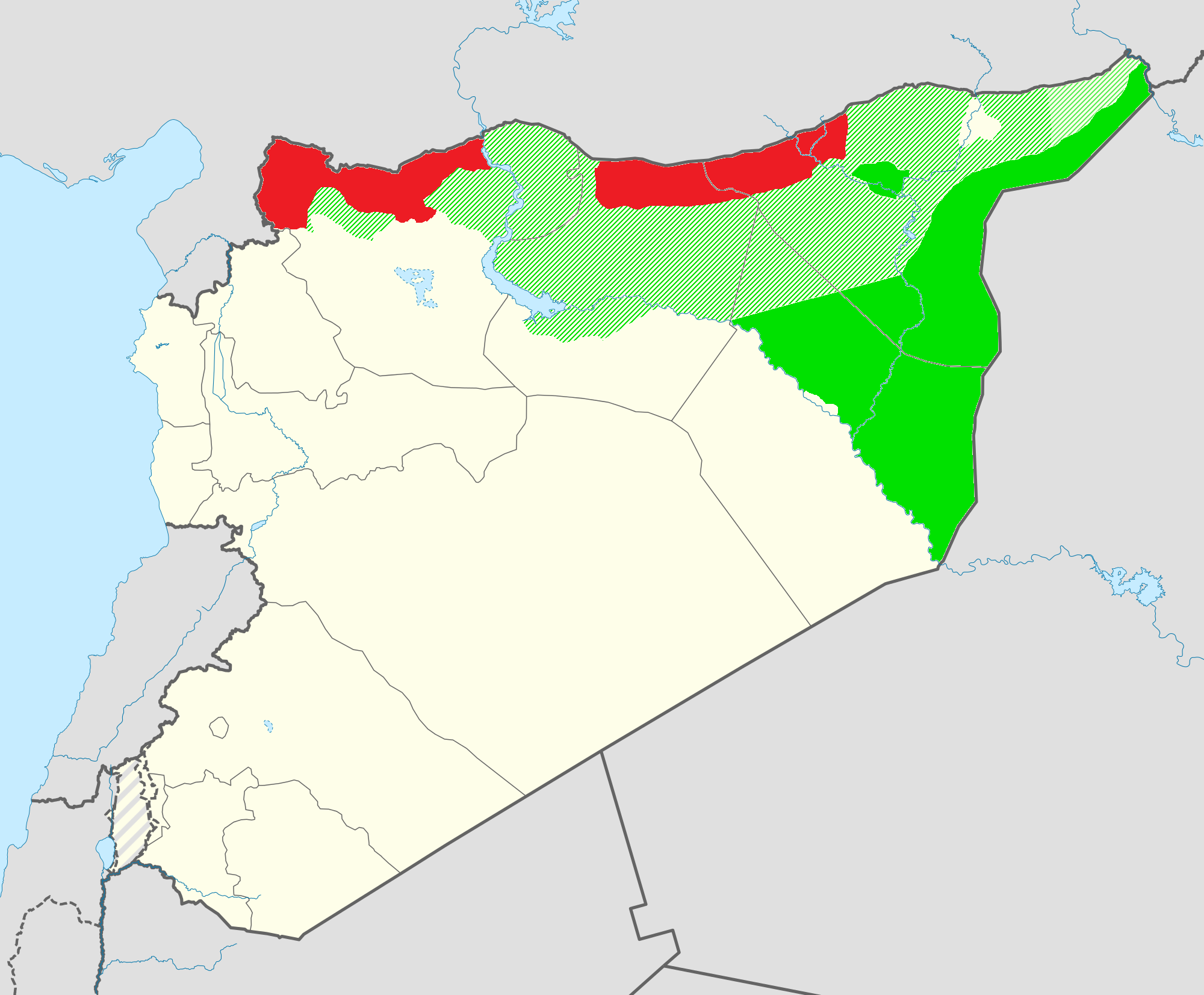
SDF-controlled territory (green) and Turkish-occupied territory (red) in October 2019

On 3 March 2017, the Rojava Asayish arrested more than 40 members of the KNC in Syria while the KDP Asayish arrested 23 opposition protesters in Iraqi Kurdistan. 17 of them were later released but 6 were still imprisoned. By 16 March, more than 13 KNC offices and an Assyrian Democratic Organization office in Rojava were shut down by Rojava Asayish forces, reportedly for failing to register with PYD authorities. In response, the Human Rights Watch called on both sides to "immediately" release all "arbitrarily held political detainees". The Mesopotamia National Council announced their support for TEV-DEM's requirement for parties to apply to licenses to operate in Rojava. However, the council also called for the self-management to give sufficient time for applications and denounced "random" closing of the parties' offices.

On 3 April 2017, the Kurdish National Council called on the PYD to release 4 of its detainees: a Kurdish Future Movement in Syria member, a Kurdish Youth Movement member, and two KDP-S members. As of the same day, 6 detainees were still held by Iraqi Kurdish authorities.

On 12 April 2017, an official in TEV-DEM met with Gabriel Moushe Gawrieh, head of the Assyrian Democratic Organization, and discussed the closure of the latter's offices since March. It was the first time TEV-DEM officials met with the ADO.

=== Rojava–Islamist conflict ===
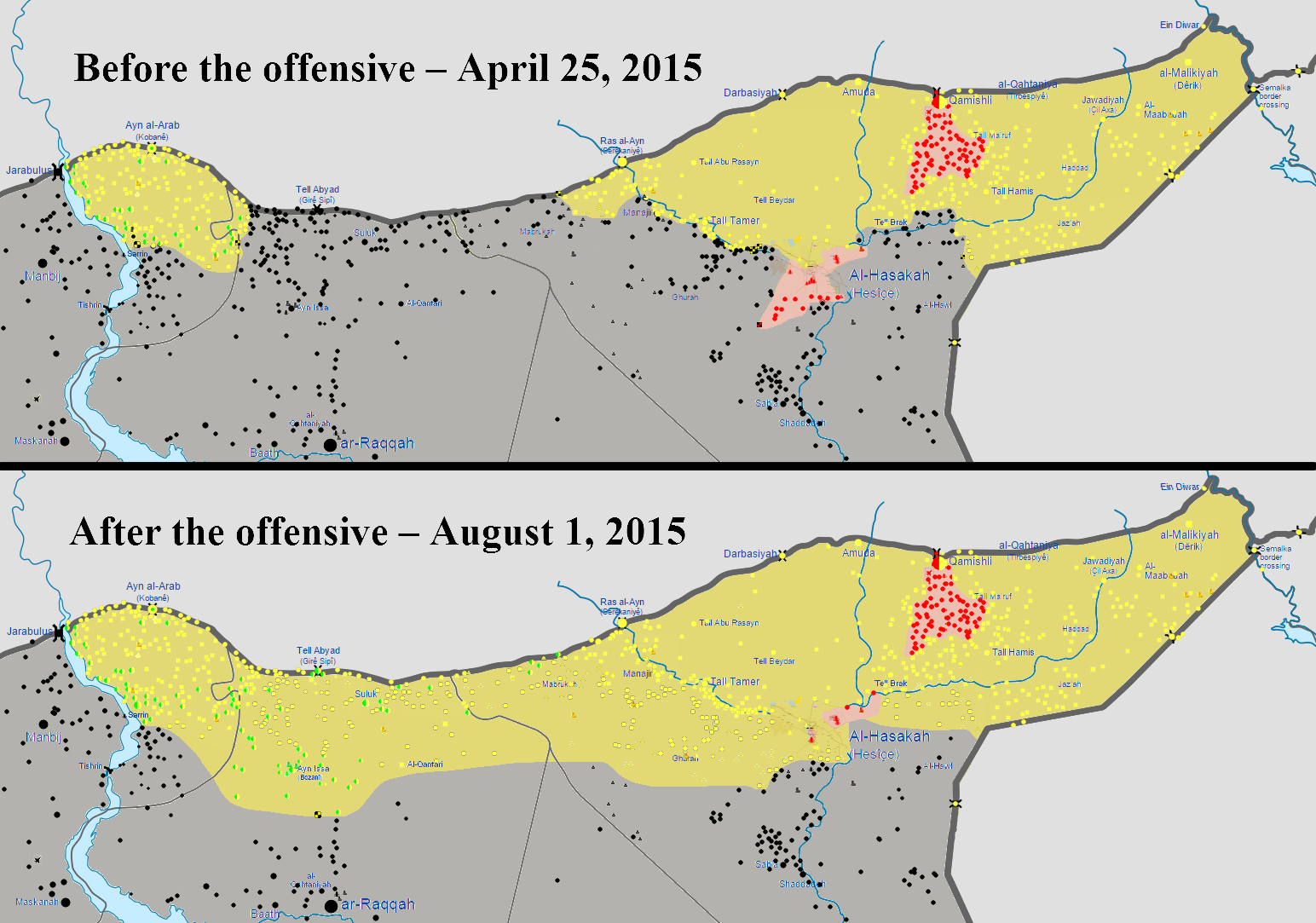
Changes of territorial control in the YPG's June 2015 offensive

2016/17 Raqqa campaign

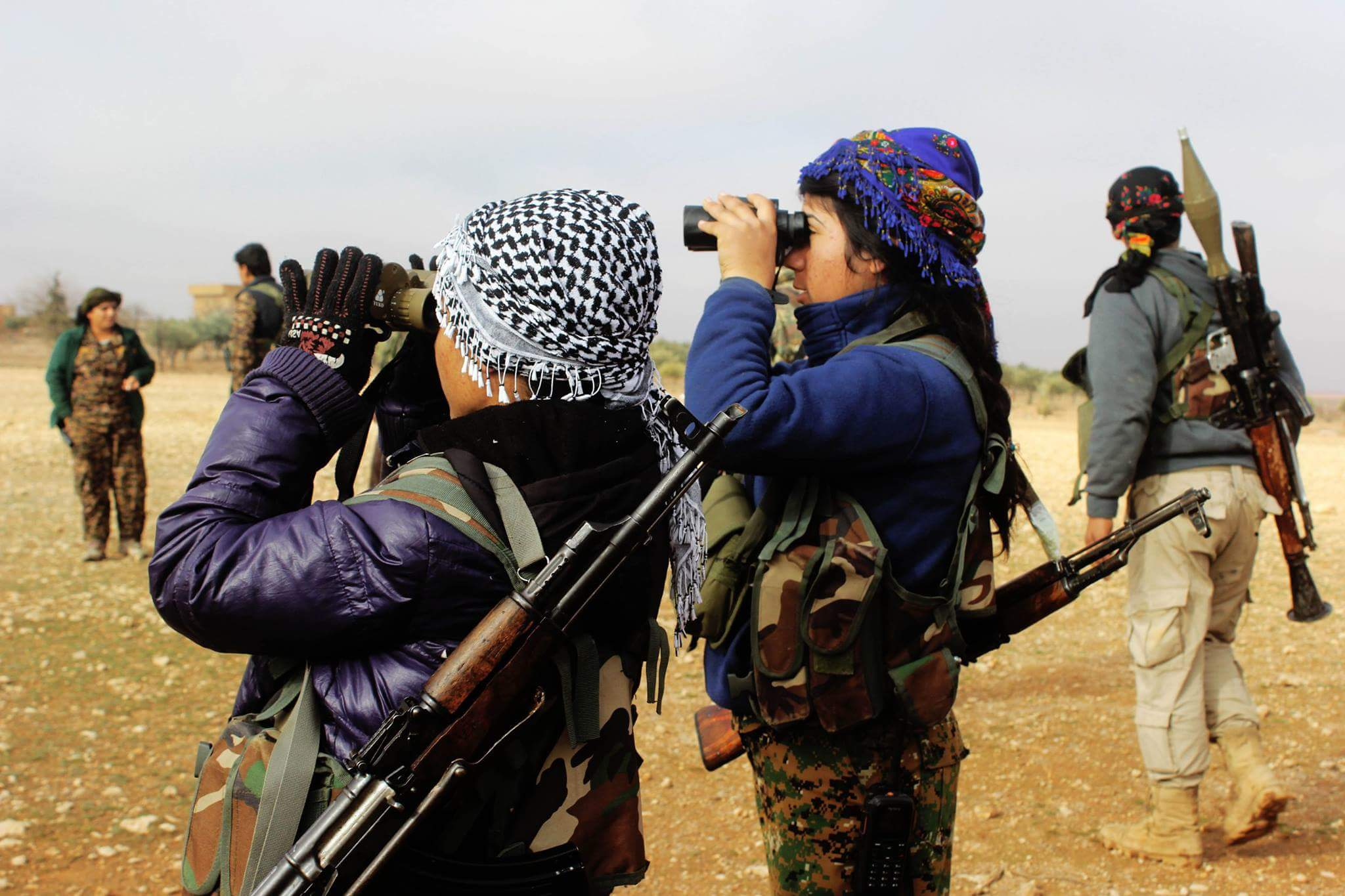
Kurdish YPJ fighters during the Raqqa offensive against ISIL in February 2017

The Rojava–Islamist conflict is a major theater in the Syrian civil war, starting in 2013 after fighting erupted between the Kurdish People's Protection Units (YPG) and Islamist rebel factions in the city of Ras al-Ayn. Kurdish forces launched a campaign in an attempt to take control of the Islamist-controlled areas in the governorate of al-Hasakah and some parts of Raqqa and Aleppo governorates after al-Qaeda in Syria used those areas to attack the YPG. The Kurdish groups and their allies' goal was also to capture Kurdish areas from the Arab Islamist rebels and strengthen the autonomy of the region of Rojava.

YPG forces as well as later the broader Syrian Democratic Forces (SDF) have clashed heavily with Islamist forces of all stripes in the following years, in particular with those representing the Islamic State of Iraq and the Levant (ISIL). Including the Siege of Kobanî (2014), the Al-Hasakah offensive (February–March 2015), the Al-Hasakah offensive (May 2015), the Tell Abyad offensive (May–July 2015), the Battle of Sarrin (June–July 2015), the Battle of Al-Hasakah (June–August 2015), and the Raqqa campaign (2016–2017) including the Battle of Tabqa (2017).

=== Rojava–Turkey conflict ===
Turkey has long called the PYD as a Syrian extension of the Kurdistan Workers' Party (PKK), and has therefore taken a hardline stance against the group, the official talking point being that it would not allow a PKK-aligned state to form along their southern border with Syria. Turkey's policy towards Rojava is based on an economic blockade, persistent attempts of international isolation, opposition to the cooperation of the international Anti-ISIL-coalition with Rojava militias, and support of Islamist Syrian Civil War parties hostile towards Rojava, in past times even including ISIL. Turkey has on several occasions been militarily attacking Rojava territory and defence forces. The latter has resulted in some of the most clearcut instances of international solidarity with Rojava.

Turkey received PYD co-chair Salih Muslim for talks in 2013 and in 2014, even entertaining the idea of opening a Rojava representation office in Ankara "if it's suitable with Ankara's policies". Turkey recognizes the PYD and the YPG militia as identical to the Kurdistan Workers' Party (PKK), which is listed as a terrorist organisation by Turkey, the European Union, the United States and others. However, the EU, the US, and others cooperate with the PYD and the YPG militia in the fight against the Islamic State of Iraq and the Levant (ISIL) and do not designate either a terrorist organisation. About its loss in international standing, the consequence of domestic and foreign policies of Recep Tayyip Erdoğan, the Turkish government is contemptuous. The Turkish foreign minister called the PYD a "terrorist organisation" in his speech at the meeting of Council of Foreign Ministers of the 13th Islamic Summit of the Organisation of Islamic Cooperation (OIC) on 12 April 2016 at Istanbul, Turkey. In November 2016 a state-run media organization of Turkey, Anadolu Agency, stated that the educational institutions of Rojava had "prejudice against Islam". U.S. Defense Secretary Ashton Carter said there were links between the PYD, the YPG, and the PKK. Secretary Carter replied, "Yes," to a Senate panel when Sen. Lindsey Graham (R-SC) asked whether he believed the Syrian Kurds are "aligned or at least have substantial ties to the PKK". Rojava and YPG leaders state that the PKK is a separate organization. YPG representatives have persistently reiterated that their militia has an all Syrian agenda and no agenda of hostility whatsoever towards Turkey. However, according to the Turkish Daily Sabah, at one occasion in January 2016 "a YouTube video has appeared of an English-speaking man, reported to be a fighter from the Democratic Union Party's (PYD) armed wing, the People's Protection Units (YPG) (...) making a call for Westerners to join the ranks of the armed group and conduct terrorist attacks against the Turkish state." In the perception of much of the Turkish public, the Rojava federal project as well as U.S. support for the YPG against ISIL are elements of a wider conspiracy scheme by a "mastermind" with the aim to weaken or even dismember Turkey, in order to prevent its imminent rise as a global power.

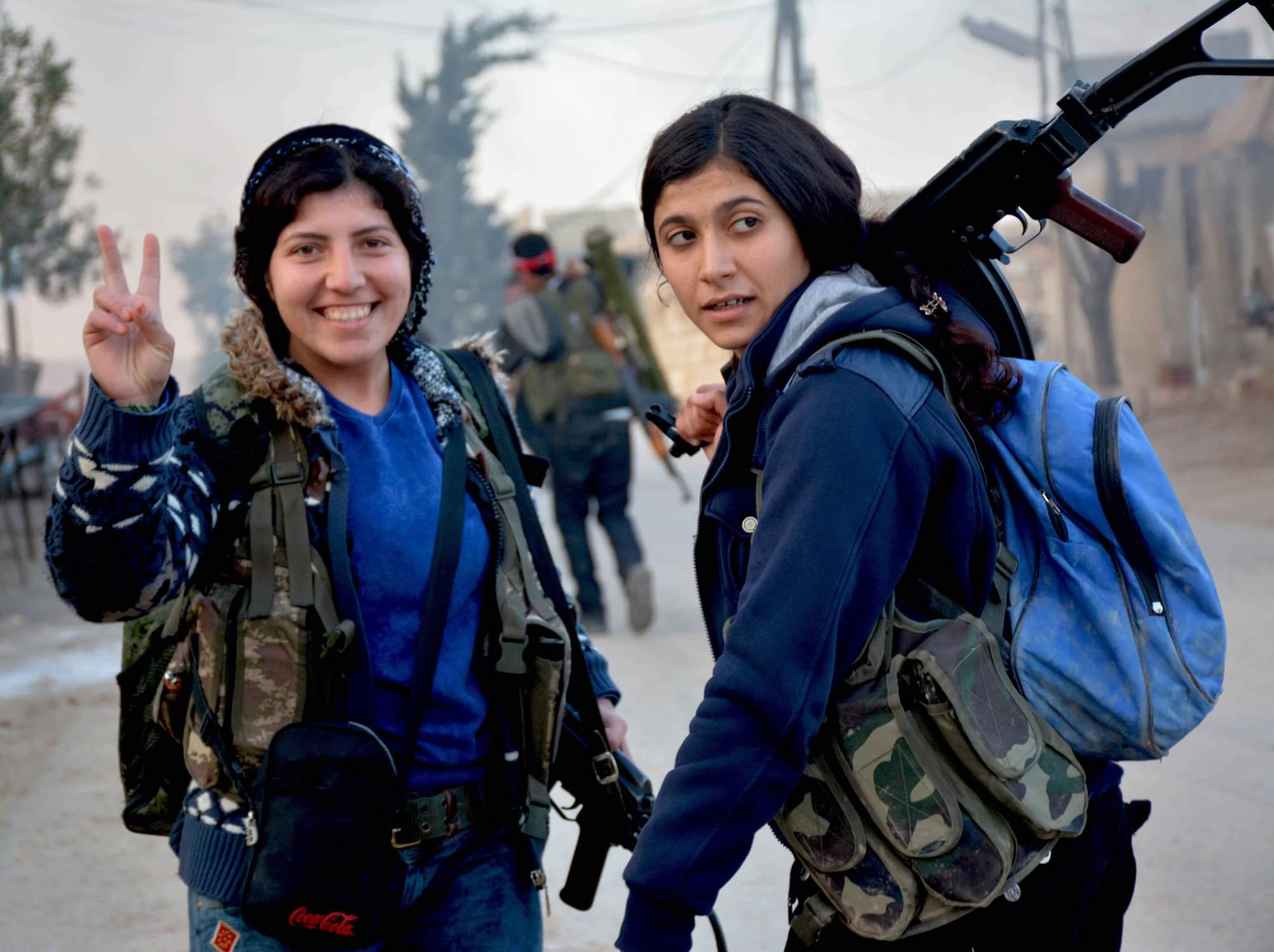
Women's Protection Units (YPJ) fighters in the Afrin Region during the Turkish invasion of Afrin in February 2018

Following YPG successes in 2015, including the capture of Tell Abyad, Turkey began targeting YPG forces in northern Syria. On 16 February 2016, Turkish forces began shelling Kurdish forces in the Afrin District after the SDF took initiative from an SAA offensive and captured rebel-held areas of the Azaz District, including Tell Rifaat and Menagh Airbase. Turkey vowed not to allow the SDF to capture the key border town of Azaz. As a result, 25 Kurdish militants were killed and 197 injured from Turkish artillery fire. In early 2016, following the capture of Tishrin Dam, the Syrian Democratic Forces (SDF) were allowed to cross the Euphrates River, a proclaimed 'red line' by Turkey. Turkish forces bombed the Kurdish YPG headquarters in Tell Abyad, destroying three armoured vehicles and injuring two Kurdish fighters. The following day, 21 January 2016, Turkish troops crossed the border into Syria and entered the ISIL-controlled Syrian border town of Jarabulus which the YPG had been planning on capturing as part of an offensive to unite their areas of control into one continuous banner of territory. Kurdish-led forces in northern Syria said Turkish airstrikes hit their bases in Amarneh village near Jarablus on 27 August 2016, after Turkish artillery shelled the positions the day before. The Syrian Observatory reported on 27 August 2016, about exchange of gunfire between YPG and the Turkish forces in the countryside north of Hasakah. It is unclear if Turkish forces were on Syrian territory or had fired across the border.

In March 2017, U.S. Lieutenant General Stephen Townsend said "I have seen absolutely zero evidence that they have been a threat to, or have supported any attacks on, Turkey from Northern Syria over the last two years." The top U.S. commander in the campaign against Islamic State of Iraq and the Levant (ISIL) stated that the Peoples’ Protection Units (YPG), the military wing of the Syrian Kurdish Democratic Union Party (PYD), does not pose a threat to Turkey. "Of those YPG fighters, I've talked to their leaders and we've watched them operate and they continually reassure us that they have no desire to attack Turkey, that they are not a threat to Turkey, in fact that they desire to have a good working relationship with Turkey."

After the initiation of the 2024 Syrian opposition offenses against the Assad regime, Turkey and the Turkish-backed Syrian National Army (SNA) launched an offensive to capture territory from the SDF. In December 2024, the SNA captured Tell Rifaat and Manbij from SDF control. Following the fall of the Assad regime, Turkish officials have demanded the elimination of the YPG, and Turkish President Recep Tayyip Erdogan has threatened a military intervention if the autonomous region remains divided from the rest of Syria. The Turkish offensive in northern Syria has continued into 2025.

== Aftermath ==
The hopes of the Western left for a revolution in Rojava were shattered by the government offensive in early 2026. As DAANES integrates into the Syrian state, some Rojava activists have vowed to defend their rights during Syria's transition process.

== See also ==
- Cities and towns during the Syrian Civil War
- International Freedom Battalion
- Rojava–Islamist conflict
- Timeline of the Kurdistan Workers' Party insurgency (2015–2025)
- 1983–1986 Kurdish rebellions in Iraq
- Kurdish women
- A Modern History of the Kurds
- Western Iran clashes (2016–2023)
- Western Iran clashes (2026–present)
