= Assyrian Democratic Party =

Political party in Syria

Assyrian Democratic Party ܓܒܐ ܐܬܘܪܝܐ ܕܝܡܘܩܪܛܝܐ الحزب الآشوري الديمقراطي
- President: Ninos Isho
- Founder: Adam Homeh
- Founded: 1978
- Split from: Assyrian Democratic Organization
- Headquarters: Qamishli, Syria
- Paramilitary wing: Khabour Guards, Nattoreh
- Ideology: Eastern Assyrian interests Syrian-Assyrian self-determination Christian politics Social democracy
- Political position: Centre-left
- Democratic Council: 1 / 43

Party flag

Website
- Facebook

The Assyrian Democratic Party (Syriac: ܓܒܐ ܐܬܘܪܝܐ ܕܝܡܘܩܪܛܝܐ, romanized: Gabā Aṯurāyā Demoqraṭāyā, Arabic: الحزب الآشوري الديمقراطي; short: ADP) is an Assyrian political party active in Syria, that traditionally represents the interests of the Eastern Assyrians of the Khabur valley. Although aiming for the peaceful implementation of democracy in Syria, the party has generally sided and cooperated with the Ba'athist government since the 1990s. In course of the Syrian Civil War, the Assyrian Democratic Party has come to be closely affiliated with the Khabour Guards and Nattoreh. It is part of the Syrian Democratic Council of Rojava.

== Ideology ==
Since its foundation, the Assyrian Democratic Party has been considered to be "overtly sectarian", regarding the Eastern Assyrians as the only "true" Assyrians while distrusting the Western Assyrians. Since the outbreak of the Syrian Civil War, the party has however gradually broadened its aims and become more inclusive. In 2014 it began to work closely with other Assyrian and Christian denominations in the "General Authority of the Chaldean Syriac Assyrians", a committee whose stated aims also include ensuring social equality and more rights for all Christians of al-Hasakah Governorate. In 2017, the party declared that it wanted a new constitution for Syria that recognized all Assyrians as native people of Syria and granted them "cultural, administrative and other rights".

The ADP also officially rejects partisanship and supports the peaceful implementation of democracy in Syria, and is social democratic according to Al-Araby Al-Jadeed. Nevertheless, the party has generally sided and cooperated with the Ba'athist government since the 1990s, and supported pro-government militias in the civil war. The ADP advocates the unity of Syria, though has begun to support plans for the country's federalization since 2017. By July 2018, an ADP member stated that the "federal model that was set up [in northern Syria] is satisfying as we feel sufficiently represented".

== History ==
=== Foundation and early years ===
The Assyrian Democratic Party was founded in 1978, when a splinter faction under Adam Homeh seceded from the Assyrian Democratic Organization (ADO). From its outset, the ADP understood itself as proponent of rights for the Eastern Assyrians as opposed to the Western Assyrians, who dominated the ADO. Over time, a strong rivalry developed between the pro-opposition ADO and the ADP, which shifted increasingly closer to the Ba'athist government in the 1990s. As result, the Assyrian Democratic Party came to present itself as the pro-government alternative to the ADO, and when taking part in various Syrian parliamentary elections, supported Assyrian candidates that were not strongly opposed to the rule of the al-Assad family.

=== Activities during the civil war ===
When the Syrian Civil War broke out in 2012, the ADP openly opposed the Syrian opposition, with some of its members even joining the government militias (Popular Committees) in Qamishli. The Assyrian Democratic Party also expressed support for the pro-government Sootoro.

In late 2013, the ADP lamented that the Free Syrian Army had occupied the Assyrian villages in the Khabur valley, saying that even though the FSA fighters did not harass the locals, their presence caused the area to become a target for government attacks. This in turn forced the Assyrians to flee their homes. The ADP also protested against the declaration of the autonomous region "Rojava" by the Kurdish-led administration in northern Syria around that time. Party president Ninos Isho stated in early 2014 that it is "not logical to have 30 percent of the population [the Kurds] in this area rule over the other 70 percent [the Arabs and Assyrians]", and that "the Kurdish political groups must accept real power-sharing". In September 2014, the Assyrian Democratic Party put up a shelter in Qamishli for Yazidis who had fled the Sinjar massacre, and distributed food, clothing and medicine to them. The party also participated in the formation of the "General Authority of the Chaldean Syriac Assyrians" in the next month. This committee aimed at strengthening the cooperation of the different Christian churches, parties and organizations in al-Hasakah Governorate, and ensuring the rights of all Christians in the region. Among the participants was also the pro-Kurdish Syriac Union Party.

After the assassination of one of its commanders by the YPG, the Khabour Guards (a small Assyrian self-defense militia) broke their ties with the Syriac Union Party and aligned themselves with the ADP around mid-2015. In November 2015, the ADP issued a statement condemning purported human rights violations in Rojava by the governing Democratic Union Party (PYD). Despite this, the ADP joined the PYD-led Syrian Democratic Council one month later, with Wail Mîrza serving as the party's representative in the assembly. In January 2017, the Assyrian Democratic Party reached a deal with the PYD, according to which the Khabour Guards and Nattoreh would become the sole security force for the Assyrian villages in the Khabur valley. In return, the Khabour Guards and Nattoreh joined the Syrian Democratic Forces, while the ADP agreed to support the PYD's federalism project for Syria. Nevertheless, the party continues to advocate "the unity of Syria, as a country and people". On 13 April, PYD forces officially handed over the valley's villages to the Khabour Guards and Nattoreh, though the YPG kept a military base near Tell Tamer. The Assyrian Democratic Party said that this was a first step towards establishing Assyrian self-administration in the Khabur valley.

Party President Ninos Isho also stated during a meeting with Russian deputy foreign minister Mikhail Bogdanov in April 2017 that the party wants a new Syrian constitution that grants self-determination, more rights and recognition as native people to the Syrian Assyrians. The Assyrian Democratic Party also took part in the Northern Syria regional elections in December 2017 as part of the PYD-led "Democratic Nation List". Party official Wail Mîrza called the election "historical", and further said that such elections are what Assyrians "are striving for all over Syria". The ADP took part in the Sochi peace talks of January 2018.

On 20 September 2018, the Assyrian Democratic Party announced the creation of a united military leadership for Nattoreh and the Khabour Guards, known as "General Command of the Assyrian Forces". The Khabour Guards already left the "Assyrian Forces" in the following December.
