= Nattoreh =

Assyrian militia

Assyrian People's Guard – Nattoreh
- ܢܛܘܪ̈ܐ ܕܬܠ ܬܡܪ ܐܫܘܪܝܐ; Naṭore d'Tel Tamer Ashoraye
- Leader: Robert Ichou
- Dates active: 2011 (possibly) – present
- Allegiance: Assyrian Democratic Party
- Headquarters: Tell Tamer
- Active regions: Northeastern Syria
- Size: c. 100–200 (2017 estimate)
- Part of: Syrian Democratic Forces: General Command of the Assyrian Forces (from Sept. 2018)
- Wars: the Syrian civil war
- Website: Facebook

The Assyrian People's Guard – Nattoreh (Syriac: ܢܛܘܪ̈ܐ ܕܬܠ ܬܡܪ ܐܫܘܪܝܐ, romanized: Naṭore d'Tel Tamer Ashoraye; Arabic: اللجنه الشعبيه للحرس الأشوري) is an Assyrian militia of the Syrian Democratic Forces. It is based in the Khabur valley town of Tell Tamer northwest of Al-Hasakah, an area with a large Assyrian population, in the Autonomous Administration of North and East Syria. The militia is composed of local Assyrians and, along with the Khabour Guards, is affiliated with the Assyrian Democratic Party.

== History ==
While its exact foundation date is unknown, some sources allege that Nattoreh was first set up on 1 October 2011. Since its formation, the militia has taken part in several Syrian Democratic Forces-led operations against the Islamic State of Iraq and the Levant, such as the Manbij offensive (2016), the Raqqa campaign (2016–2017), and the Deir ez-Zor campaign (2017–2019). Nattoreh also protects ceremonies and celebrations of the Assyrian Church of the East.

On 25 February 2017, the Assyrian Democratic Party agreed to join the Syrian Democratic Council, and the People's Protection Units (YPG) agreed to hand over security in the Assyrian towns along the Khabur River to the Khabour Guards and Nattoreh, both of which joined the Syrian Democratic Forces. On 13 April, the YPG officially handed over responsibility for the security of the Khabur valley's villages to the Khabour Guards and Nattoreh, though it kept a military base near Tell Tamer.

On 20 September 2018, Nattoreh joined the General Command of the Assyrian Forces, an umbrella organization founded by the Assyrian Democratic Party.

== See also ==
- Assyrian Democratic Party
- Syrian Democratic Forces
- Syriac Military Council
- Khabour Guards
- Sootoro
- Sutoro

== Bibliography ==
- Rashid, Bedir Mulla (2018) [1st pub. 2017]. Military and Security Structures of the Autonomous Administration in Syria. Translated by Obaida Hitto. Istanbul: Omran for Strategic Studies. Archived from the original on 2018-07-01.
