= Bethnahrin National Council =

Bethnahrin National Council ܡܘܬܒܐ ܐܘܡܬܝܐ ܕܒܝܬܢܗܪܝܢ
- Chairman: Mikhail Naim Hadodo
- Preceded by: Bethnahrin Freedom Party
- Ideology: Assyrian nationalism: Dawronoye

The Bethnahrin National Council or Mesopotamia National Council (Classical Syriac: ܡܘܬܒܐ ܐܘܡܬܝܐ ܕܒܝܬܢܗܪܝܢ, romanized: Mawtbo Umthoyo d'Bethnahrin, MUB), formerly the Bethnahrin Freedom Party (Classical Syriac: ܓܒܐ ܕܚܐܪܘܬܐ ܕܒܝܬܢܗܪܝܢ, romanized: Gabo d'Ḥirutho d'Bethnahrin, GHB) and the Patriotic Revolutionary Organization of Bethnahrin (Classical Syriac: ܛܘܟܣܐ ܕܘܪܢܝܐ ܡܬܢܝܐ ܕܒܝܬܢܗܪܝܢ, romanized: Ṭukoso Dawronoyo Mothonoyo d'Beth Nahrin, PROB) is a militant socialist Assyrian-Syriac party in the Dawronoye movement, whose stated goal is autonomy for Assyrian-Syriac people, either as an independent state or some other structure, in Bethnahrin, the Assyrian homeland. The organization is allied with multiple parties within the Kurdistan Communities Union (KCK), including the Kurdistan Workers Party (PKK) and the Syrian Democratic Union Party (PYD). The council has active political party affiliates in Iraq, Lebanon and Syria.

== History as the PROB and GHB ==
The Patriotic Revolutionary Organization of Bethnahrin was formed in the 1990s by Assyrian-Syriac nationalists who previously fought within the PKK against Turkey.

The group carried out its first attack alongside the PKK against a Kurdistan Democratic Party (KDP) military compound in the town of Qasre on 17 July 1999, where 39 KDP Peshmerga fighters were killed and 20 injured. Three days later a second attack was carried out by the group in which several of Massoud Barzani's fighters were killed when a Peshmerga army truck driving on a bridge between Qasre and Haji Omeran was blown up by the PROB. The group claimed both attacks were to avenge the death of Assyrian woman Helene Aloun Sawa, who was raped and killed by the Peshmerga.

On 24 July 2000, approximately a hundred members of the PROB forced entry in a governmental building in Lausanne, Switzerland. PROB wanted to attract the attention of the Swiss government and media to issues relating to the Assyrian-Syriac people, especially in relation to their treatment in Turkey. They emphasized how the 1923 Treaty of Lausanne denied the Assyrian-Syriac people in Turkey their national rights and oppression faced by Assyrian-Syriacs in Turkey.

At its first congress in 2000, the PROB reorganized as the Bethnahrin Freedom Party, which was listed as a terrorist organization by the Turkish government in 2001. According to Wladimir van Wilgenburg, the GHB's founder, Numan Ogur, was kidnapped in 2003 after an attempt to try to leave the organization. During the invasion of Iraq in 2003, the GHB cooperated with Patriotic Union of Kurdistan (PUK) Peshmerga, hoping to gain political influence in Iraq.

== Branches ==
- American Syriac Union
- Beth Nahrin Patriotic Union (Iraq)
- Syriac Union Party (Lebanon)
- Syriac Union Party (Syria)
- European Syriac Union

== Reorganization as the MUB ==
In 2005, the Bethnahrin Freedom Party changed its name to the Bethnahrin National Council. The council stated that it may resume military operations in Iraq, Syria, or Lebanon. Its affiliate in Syria is the Syriac Union Party (SUP). During the Syrian civil war, the SUP has established two military organizations in 2013, Sutoro and the Syriac Military Council (MFS). The group began to cooperate with other parties in the Rojava region, such as the Kurdish YPG, the Syrian Democratic Council and its military wing, the Syrian Democratic Forces.

From 25 to 27 May 2016, the 8th conference of the Bethnahrin National Council was held in Switzerland.

== See also ==
- Dawronoye
- European Syriac Union
