= European Syriac Union =

Political party in European Union

- Leader: Tony Vergili and Hülya Gabriel
- Headquarters: Brussels, Belgium
- Ideology: Dawronoye
- Political position: Left-wing

Website
- https://www.european-syriac-union.org/home.html

European Syriac Union is an alliance between different Assyrian/Syriac political and cultural organizations in Europe that was established in May 2004. The group emerged from the Bethnahrin National Council or Mawtbo Umthoyo d'Bethnahrin (MUB), formerly known as the Bethnahrin Freedom Party (GHB) and Patriotic Revolutionary Organization of Bethnahrin (PROB) or Bethnahrin Patriotic Revolution Organization. Today, it is notable for operating Suroyo TV.

== GHB history ==
GHB is a militant Assyrian/Syriac party, whose stated aim is to create an independent Assyrian state in Beth Nahrain, a reference to the Assyrian homeland. It is an ethnic secessionist organization that uses force and the threat of force against military targets for the purpose of achieving its political goal. The group has a youth wing as well dubbed "Free Youth of Bethnahrin".

== Members ==
- Syrianska-Assyriska Riksförbundet i Sverige (Sweden)
- Renyo Hiro Magazine (Sweden)
- Union of the Syriac Associations in Switzerland
- Union of the Assyrian-Syriac Associations in Germany
- Bethnahrin Information Bureau in the Netherlands
- Institut Mésopotamie de Bruxelles
- Centre Culturel du Peuple de Mésopotamie in Belgium
- Assyrian-Syriac Culture Club of Vienna, Austria
- Assyrian-Chaldean-Syriac Union (ACSU)
- Union of the Free Women of Bethnahrin (HNHB)
- Union of the Youth of Mesopotamia (HCB)

== See also ==
- Dawronoye
- Iskender Alptekin
- Syriac Union Party (Syria)
- Syriac Union Party (Lebanon)
- Syriac Military Council
- Sutoro
