= Dawronoye =

Assyrian national liberation movement

Dawronoye (Syriac: ܕܲܘܪܵܢܵܝܹܐ) is a secular, leftist, national liberation movement among the Assyrian people. Ideologically characterized by progressive ideas and including socialist elements, its founding roots can be traced to the late 1980s in the town of Midyat in Turkey. The modern manifestation of the movement is controversial among Assyrian organizations worldwide, particularly due to its ties to the Kurdistan Workers' Party (PKK) and the Democratic Union Party (PYD).

A symbol used by multiple Dawronoye organizations

== History ==
In the late 1980s, a group of Assyrian youth gathered in Midyat to discuss the situation of Assyrians in Turkey after an increase of attacks directed at them. Assyrians were not recognized as a distinct ethnic group with their own language, and suffered from discrimination and oppression. The continued violence had led to a wave of migration of Assyrians towards Europe, leading a group of Assyrians to create an organization that had the main goal of preventing the exodus of Assyrians from the Assyrian homeland.

This organization, founded in 1995, came to be known as "Tukoso Dawronoyo Mothonoyo d'Bethnahrin", translated as the Patriotic Revolutionary Organization of Bethnahrin (PROB). According to Carl Drott, the etymology behind "Dawronoye" shows that the word is understood to mean "revolutionaries" when in fact it turned out to mean "the modern".

The founding members of Dawronoye found a correlation between the struggle of the Assyrians and Kurds in Turkey, prompting members of the movement to join the local support network of the Kurdistan Workers Party (PKK). Eventually, members of Dawronoye were arrested for their involvement with the PKK and later released, leading to the migration of some members of the movement to Europe where a diaspora network was eventually founded in European nations such as Sweden, Netherlands, Belgium, Austria and Germany.

In 2000, Dawronoye held their first congress, and members reorganized as the Bethnahrin Freedom Party (Gabo d'Hirutho d'Bethnahrin, or GHB).

== Ideology ==
The organization originated in the late 1980s from the radical left and describes itself as being "revolutionary socialist". Its initial purpose was to attain national rights of Assyrians in Turkey and prevent the exodus of Assyrians from their native homeland. However, the organization's goals were not confined to national rights, but extended to bringing out wider social, political, and cultural change.

Dawronoye avoided involvement with the Assyrian/Syriac name dispute, holding both the Assyrian and Aramean flags at events and would circumvent the name dispute by rallying around the less controversial name of their homeland - Bethnahrain. Dawronoye pushed the idea that Assyrians/Syriacs are the same people, with the same homeland.

== Iraq ==
There is a network of Dawronoye created civil society organizations and parties across modern state boundaries in the Assyrian homeland region. Among the Dawronoye affiliated organizations in Iraq are the Beth Nahrin Patriotic Union (Huyodo Bethnahrin Athronoyo, HBA) and the Nineveh Plain Forces (NPF) militia.

On 17 July 1999, the Dawronoye-affiliated Patriotic Revolutionary Organization of Bet Nahrain (PROB) carried out its first attack along with the Kurdistan Workers' Party (PKK) against a KDP military compound in the town of Kasre, where 39 Peshmerga fighters were killed and 20 injured. Three days later a second attack was carried out by the group in which several of Masoud Barzani's fighters were killed when an army truck driving on a bridge between Kasre and Hajji Umran was blown up. Both attacks were claimed to be in retaliation to the death of an Assyrian woman, Helen A. Sawa, who was allegedly raped and murdered by a senior KDP official.

The political wing of the Dawronoye movement in Iraq is the Patriotic Union of Beth Nahrian (PUBN) which was previously on the Ishtar Patriotic List and runs for seats in the Council of Representatives of Iraq and the Iraqi Kurdistan Parliament. Another Dawronoye affiliated political party in Iraq includes the Syriac Assembly Movement which is based in the Assyrian town of Bakhdida. Both the PUBN and Syriac Assembly Movement have been in favour of the creation of an autonomous region in the Assyrian-dominated Nineveh plain.

The Nineveh Plain Forces (NPF) was formed on 6 January 2015 in cooperation with the Bet-Nahrain Democratic Party to defend the Nineveh Plain against the Islamic State of Iraq and the Levant. The armed force later participated in the Battle of Mosul (2016–2017) to liberate the Assyrian towns/villages from jihadists.

== Syria ==
A flag used by the Syriac Union Party to represent Assyrian-Syriacs

The movement is currently most prominent in Syria, with the Dawronoye affiliated Syriac Union Party (SUP), which is a major partner in the governing Movement for a Democratic Society (TEV-DEM) coalition of the Federation of Northern Syria - Rojava, led by the Kurdish Democratic Union Party (PYD). The SUP operates the Syriac Military Council (MFS) and Bethnahrain Women's Protection Forces (HSNB) militia which are a part of the Syrian Democratic Forces, as well as the Sutoro police force to protect Assyrian communities in their settlement areas in northeast Syria (Gozarto).

== Europe ==
Whereas previous generations of Assyrians in Europe had emphasised a Christian identity or (in the 1970s-80s) a secular ethnic identity, rooted in the ancient Assyrian empire, a generation arriving in the 1990s from towns and villages in south-eastern Turkey, who had been radicalised by the Turkish state's suppression of the PKK, identified with Dawronoye ideology. According to one anthropologist, describing the community in Sweden:

A more politicised generation had found their 'revolutionary selves' by supporting the Kurdish cause in the 'Mesopotamian fraternity' through active resistance against state repression; this position represented a break from the historically submissive position of Assyrian–Syriacs with respect to the state... These events led to the formation in 1996 of a new political movement around the Mesopotamia Freedom Party Gabo d'Hirutho d'Bethnahrin (GHB), whose supporters and members are known as Dawronoye d'Bethnahrin (Revolutionaries of Bethnahrin). This party sought to represent all Assyrians, Syriacs and Chaldeans regardless of sectarian or class differences; it aimed to achieve recognition of cultural and political rights of Assyrian–Syriacs as indigenous communities and it sought sovereignty over an ancestral homeland, referred to as Bethnahrin, a territory that encompasses part of Iraq, south-eastern Turkey, western Iran and eastern Syria. The party adopted symbols to raise political and historical consciousness, and it emphasised solidarity with the Kurdish cause.

Most of Dawronoye's activities in Europe centred around the Assyrian genocide, commonly known between Assyrians as "Seyfo", which Turkey refuses to recognize to this present day. Activism for genocide recognition would include street protests, hunger strikes, and building occupations.

In one notable event in 2000, 100 members of the Patriotic Revolutionary Organization of Beth Nahrin forced entry and occupied a government building in Lausanne, Switzerland where the Treaty of Lausanne was signed. The purpose of the occupation was to attract the attention of the media and Swiss government on the denial of Assyrian rights in Turkey due to the Treaty of Lausanne, the continued oppression on the Assyrian people in Turkey, and to call for international recognition of the Assyrian genocide.

On 15 August 2012, members of the Dawronoye-affiliated Syriac Union Party stormed the Syrian embassy in Stockholm in protest of the Syrian government. A dozen of its members were later detained by Swedish police.

A number of delegates representing several Assyrian cultural-political organizations in Europe attended a congress held in Brussels between the 14th and 15 May 2004, to form an alliance that could represent Assyrians in Europe with governmental bodies such as the European Union and European Council. This alliance came to be known as the European Syriac Union with an associated youth group called the ESU Youth.

In 2004, a satellite television channel, Suroyo TV, was formed by Dawronoye-affiliated members and broadcast from Södertälje in the Western Syriac and Eastern Syriac dialects.

== Criticisms and allegations ==
=== Criticism by Assyrians ===
Rival Assyrian factions accuse the Dawronoye movement of providing a cover for the PYD in harassing non-Kurdish minorities in the areas it controls.

Other Assyrian membership organisations, in particular those upholding a more traditional interpretation of Assyrian identity, are critical of Dawronoye. One 2015 statement by an Assyrian federations in the diaspora said that "By financing and propping up certain individuals and groups like the Assyrian SUP party and its armed wing the MFS, the PYD attempts to give the impression to the world that it has established good relations with all of the Assyrians in the areas it controls, and not merely with the political and military groups directly under its control. Events and testimony have made it clear that the picture is significantly more complicated."

=== Closure of Assyrian schools ===
A 2018 report in the National Review alleged that Kurdish authorities in Syria, in conjunction with Dawronoye officials, had shut down several Assyrian schools in Northern Syria and fired their administration. This was said to be because these schooled failed to register for a license and for rejecting the new curriculum approved by the Education Authority. Closure methods ranged from officially shutting down schools to having armed men enter the schools and shut them down forcefully. An Assyrian educator named Isa Rashid was later badly beaten outside of his home for rejecting the Kurdish self-administration's curriculum.

The Assyrian Policy Institute (API) also alleged that PYD and Dawronoye affiliated authorities had forcefully broken and replaced locks in schools and fired all of their staff without warning. From 1935 until then, these schools had operated under the control of the Syriac Orthodox Church and taught the Syriac language to their students. The API stated that this was an effort by the PYD to "impose a Kurdish nationalist curriculum onto all areas it governs." The forced closures were condemned by the Assyrian Democratic Organization and eventually led to widespread protests by Assyrian civilians in the area.

=== Souleman Yusph arrest ===
In 2018, the Assyrian Policy Institute reported that Assyrian journalist Souleman Yusph was arrested by the Kurdish Self-Administration in Syria through Dawronoye affiliated forces, allegedly due to his reporting of purported human rights violations enacted by PYK and Dawronoye authorities in Syria. This included forced closures of Assyrian schools, intimidation and imprisonment of rivals, and the severe beating of Isa Rashid.

== See also ==
- Assyrian people
- Assyrian homeland
- Beth Nahrain
- Assyrian continuity
- Assyrian nationalism
- Kurdistan Workers' Party

=== Related and associated organizations ===
- Syriac Military Council
- Bethnahrain Women's Protection Forces
- Sutoro
- Syriac Union Party (Syria)
- Syriac Union Party (Lebanon)
- Mesopotamia National Council
- Nineveh Plain Forces
- European Syriac Union
