= Iskender Alptekin =

Swiss Assyrian politician

- Born: 29 August 1961; Kafro, Tur Abdin, Turkey
- Died: 18 May 2010 (aged 48); Switzerland
- Occupations: Politician, musician
- Movement: Dowronoye

Iskender Alptekin (Syriac: ܐܣܟܢܕܪ ܐܠܦܬܟܢ; 29 August 1961 – 18 May 2010), also known as Matay Rabo, was an Assyrian politician, musician and the President of the European Syriac Union (ESU).

== Biography ==
Iskender Alptekin was born on 29 August 1961 in the Kafro village in Tur Abdin, Turkey. He passed his childhood at the village while studying the primary at the same time learning Syriac language. He left his village in 1977 for Istanbul to find work. In 1978 he married Ferida Cacan and emigrated to Switzerland. He was the father of two daughters. In Switzerland he became active in Syriac politics, joining various national conferences in Europe, the United States, and Australia.

Iskender Alptekin became the first chairman of the newly established European Syriac Union on 14 May 2004. He was again unanimously re-elected at the second ESU Congress in 2007.

== Death ==
On 18 May 2010, Alptekin died of a heart attack in Switzerland.

== See also ==
- European Syriac Union
