= Khabur Guards =

Assyrian militia in Syria

Khabour Guards
- ܡܘܬܒܐ ܕܢܛܘܪ̈ܐ ܕܚܒܘܪ; Mawtḇā d-Nāṭorē d-Ḥābor
- Leaders: Council of the Khabur Guard Forces, chaired by Shamoun Kako (formal authority); Rueel Sulaqa (chief field commander); Nabil Warde (spokesman); Elias Nasser (WIA); David Gindo †
- Dates active: 2012/13 – ?
- Allegiance: Syriac Union Party (until 2015, from 2019); Assyrian Democratic Party (from 2015)
- Headquarters: Tell Tamer, al-Hasakah Governorate, Syria
- Active regions: Khabur Valley, Hasaka Governorate, Syria
- Size: "Hundreds" (2013) c. 75–150 (2017 estimate)
- Part of: Syrian Democratic Forces: General Command of the Assyrian Forces (Sept. – Dec. 2018); Syriac-Assyrian Military Council (from 2019)
- Wars: the Syrian Civil War
- Website: Facebook

The Khabour Guards (Syriac: ܡܘܬܒܐ ܕܢܛܘܪ̈ܐ ܕܚܒܘܪ, romanized: Mawtḇā d-Nāṭorē d-Ḥābor; Arabic: مجلس حرس الخابور الآشوري) is an Assyrian militia in Syria created after the collapse of Syrian government control in the Assyrian-majority Khabur valley in the northwest of al-Hasakah Governorate. The militia is composed of local Assyrians and maintains checkpoints in several Assyrian settlements, most notably Tell Tamer. It was initially established as an independent force, but is now affiliated with the Kurdish-led Syrian Democratic Forces. Though officially neutral and nonpartisan, the Khabour Guards are de facto affiliated with the Assyrian Democratic Party along with Nattoreh, and as a part of the Syriac-Assyrian Military Council of the Syrian Democratic Forces, they are affiliated with the Syriac Union Party.

== History ==
=== Foundation and break with the Syriac Union Party ===
The Khabour Guards were originally set up by locals of the Khabur valley around late 2012 and early 2013. The group was supposed to act as pure self-defense force for the region's Assyrian villages, stay completely neutral in the Syrian civil war, and be independent of all parties and warring factions, regardless of their political or religious orientations. Although the militia initially managed to attract hundreds of recruits, the Khabour Guards soon started to decline in military strength due to many locals migrating and the refusal of most Assyrian groups, such as the Assyrian Democratic Organization, to supply them with arms. In consequence, the Khabour Guards gave up their attempts to stay neutral and joined Sutoro, a security force formed by the Syriac Union Party. The latter started to supply the Khabour Guards through its armed wing, the Syriac Military Council (MFS). The Khabour Guards and the MFS consequently grew close, with some guards even wearing MFS insignia on their uniforms.

The Khabour Guards were initially overrun by Islamic State of Iraq and the Levant (ISIL) during a major offensive in early 2015. Nevertheless, they managed to slow the advance of ISIL with support from the MFS and mostly Kurdish People's Defense Units (YPG), though subsequent events led to the guards distancing themselves from both. On the evening of 21 April 2015, two leading Khabour Guard commanders, David Gindo and Elias Nasser, were abducted, blindfolded, shot and left for dead in an area close to the village of Jumayla. Elias Nasser managed to survive the assassination attempt and crawled to a main road where a passerby picked him up and took him to a hospital in Qamishli. It was initially believed that ISIL was behind the attempt to murder both of the Assyrian leaders, but Elias Nasser later revealed the assailants were members of the YPG. Four YPG fighters were subsequently arrested for their involvement in assassinating David Gindo and the assassination attempt on Elias Nasser, with two of the accused receiving a 20-year sentence while the other two received a four and one year sentence respectively.

Nevertheless, the relationship of the Khabour Guards with both YPG and the MFS worsened, and they broke ties with the Syriac Union Party over the incident. Thereafter, the militia's situation became difficult, allegedly due to pressure by the YPG to fully join the MFS. In response, the Khabour Guards' leadership announced in June 2015 that the group had decided to "lay down our weapons in the fight against ISIS". The guards then split, with many members staying close to the MFS and continuing to fight against ISIL with the YPG, while the rest of the militia aligned itself with the Assyrian Democratic Party, a rival of the Syriac Union Party.

=== Operations from 2015 ===
Meanwhile, ISIL forces were driven from the Khabur valley in course of the Western al-Hasakah offensive in May 2015. Following the reconquest, however, the various Christian militias including the Khabour Guards, looted local villages under the guise of searching for ISIL holdouts. In the following years, the militia mostly stayed neutral, though some Khabour Guards fought with the YPG in the Manbij offensive. On 25 February 2017, the Assyrian Democratic Party agreed to join the Syrian Democratic Council, while the YPG handed over security in the Assyrian towns along the Khabur River to the Khabour Guards and Nattoreh. The two groups consequently joined the Syrian Democratic Forces. On 20 September 2018, the Assyrian Democratic Party announced the formation of the "General Command of the Assyrian Forces" which was supposed to serve as umbrella organization for its affiliated paramilitaries including the Khabour Guards. The latter left the "Assyrian Forces" three months later, however, resulting in accusations that the SDF had influenced the Khabour Guards.

In late 2019, the Khabour Guards fought alongside other SDF groups against the Turkish offensive into north-eastern Syria, as Turkey and allied militias targeted the Khabur valley. In this context, the Khabour Guards' spokesman Nabil Warde declared that the Turks were "our long-time enemies", referencing the late Ottoman genocides of Christians in 1915–1918.

== See also ==
- Assyrian Democratic Party
- Syrian Democratic Forces
- Syriac Military Council
- Nattoreh
- Sootoro
- Sutoro

== Bibliography ==
- Rashid, Bedir Mulla (2018) [1st pub. 2017]. Military and Security Structures of the Autonomous Administration in Syria. Translated by Obaida Hitto. Istanbul: Omran for Strategic Studies. Archived from the original on 2018-07-01.
