= Beth Nahrain =

Areas between and surrounding the Euphrates and Tigris rivers

Beth Nahrain.

Beth Nahrain (Note: Also transliterated Bet, Beet; Nahrayn, Nahreen, Nahrin, etc.) (Syriac: ܒܝܬ ܢܗܪ̈ܝܢ, romanized: Bêṯ Nahrīn, [be̝θˈnah.rin]); lit. 'home of the (two) rivers' is the name for the region known as Mesopotamia in the Syriac language. Geographically, it refers to the areas between and surrounding the Euphrates and Tigris rivers (as well as their tributaries). The Aramaic name also refers to the area around the rivers, not only literally between the rivers.

This area roughly encompasses almost all of present-day Iraq, parts of southeastern Turkey, northwestern Iran, and, more recently, northeastern Syria. The Assyrians are considered to be indigenous inhabitants of Beth Nahrain. "Nahrainean" or "Nahrainian" is the anglicized name for "Nahrāyā" (Syriac: ܢܗܪܝܐ), which is the Aramaic equivalent of "Mesopotamian".

== History ==
=== Etymology ===
The Aramaic name has been attested since the adoption of Old Aramaic as the lingua franca of the Neo Assyrian Empire in the 8th century BCE, but the Greek name Mesopotamia was first coined in the 2nd century BCE by the historian Polybius during the Seleucid period and introduced the misnomer that Beth Nahrain strictly referred to the "land between the rivers" rather than the "land of the rivers". The name Bayn al-Nahrayn found in Arabic (بين النهرين, "between the two rivers") is a near literal translation of the word Mesopotamia where the Arabic suffix ان -ān (used to indicate that the noun is dual) introduced another misnomer that Beth Nahrain specifically referred to the land between the Tigris and Euphrates rivers. A more accurate Syriac variant is the name Bêṯ Nahrawwāṯā (Syriac: ܒܝܬ ܢܗܪ̈ܘܬܐ, "home of the rivers").

=== Modern culture ===
The term "Beth Nahrain" is commonly used by both Eastern and Western Assyrians and acts as a united front for an autonomous Assyrian region. Political and military organizations have developed using the "Beth Nahrain" name, including:

- Bethnahrain Women's Protection Forces
- Bet-Nahrain Democratic Party
- Bethnahrin Patriotic Revolution Organization
- Bethnahrin Freedom Party

== People ==
The Assyrians (also referred to as Syriacs, Arameans or Chaldeans) are the indigenous people of Beth Nahrain. They speak different dialects of Neo-Aramaic depending on their geographical location within Beth Nahrain. Today, Assyrians in Iraq and Iran as well as the Khabur River Valley in Syria speak varieties of Northeastern Neo-Aramaic while the Assyrians in Turkey and Syria mainly speak Turoyo, a dialect of Central Neo-Aramaic.

Other prominent ethnic groups present in Beth Nahrain include Arabs, Armenians, Mandaeans, Yazidis, Turkmen, Persians, Kurds and Turks.

== Geography ==
Beth Nahrain encompasses the land between and surrounding the Tigris and Euphrates, and their tributaries. The Tigris-Euphrates river system covers 35,600 km^{2} (13,700 sq mi) and forms a major river system originating from the Taurus mountains of Eastern Turkey through Syria and Iraq towards the Persian Gulf.

== See also ==
- Assyria
- Assyrian continuity
- Assyrian homeland
- Proposals for Assyrian autonomy in Iraq
- Fertile crescent – Region of the Middle East
