= Kino Gabriel =

Assyrian-Syriac military and political figure

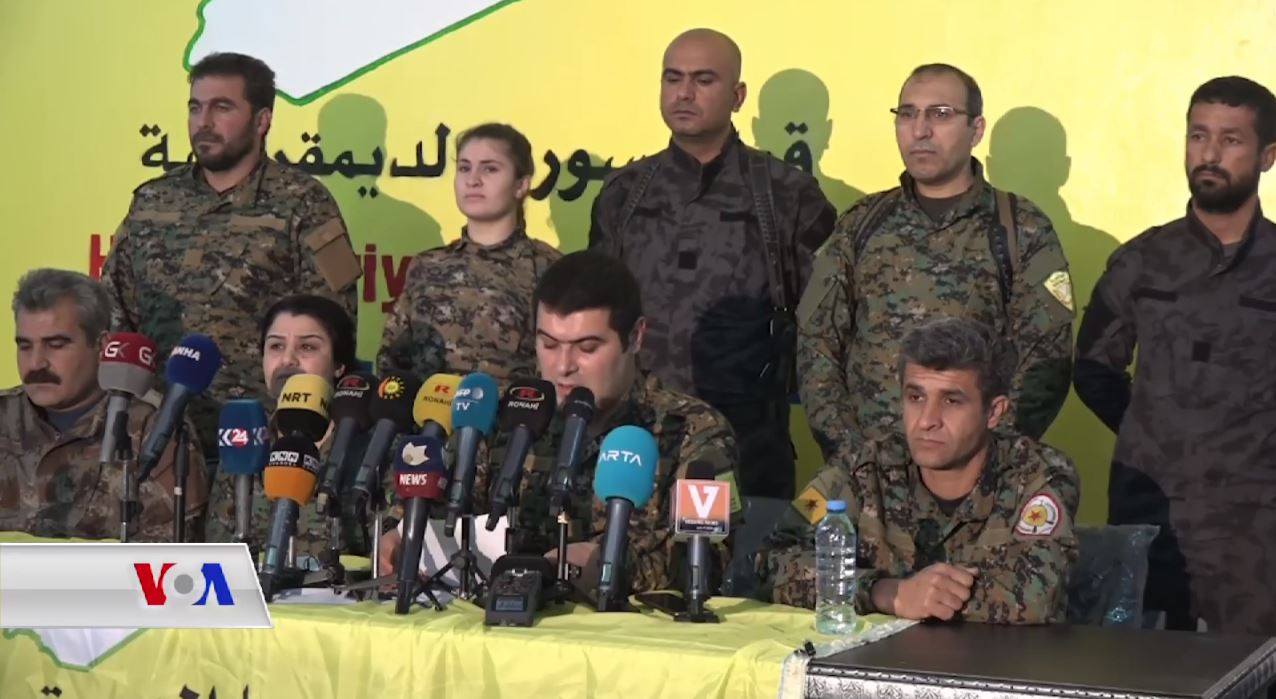
- Gabriel during a press conference

Spokesperson for the Syrian Democratic Forces

Personal details
- Born: Syria

Military service
- Allegiance: SDF
- Branch/service: Syriac Military Council
- Rank: Spokesperson
- Battles/wars: Syrian Civil War; War against ISIS

Kino Gabriel is an Assyrian-Syriac military and political figure who was associated with the Syrian Democratic Forces (SDF) until its dissolution in 2026. He served as a spokesperson for the SDF, a coalition involved in the Syrian Civil War and operations against the Islamic State (ISIS).

== Early life and background ==
Kino Gabriel is of Syriac Christian heritage. He has been involved with the Syriac Military Council, a group within the SDF that represents the Syriac community.

== Role in the Syrian Democratic Forces ==
As a spokesperson for the SDF, Gabriel has provided updates on military operations against ISIS and highlighted security challenges in areas like Al-Hol Camp. He has also addressed international forums, discussing the impact of external military operations, including those conducted by Turkey, on northern Syria.

In 2018, Gabriel commented on potential SDF reinforcements to Afrin during Turkish military operations in the area, citing concerns for civilian safety. His statements have focused on the challenges of maintaining regional security and addressing humanitarian needs.

== See also ==
- Syriac Military Council
- Syrian Democratic Forces
