= Bethnahrain Women's Protection Forces =

Syrian military and police organization

- ܚܝܠܘ̈ܬܐ ܕܣܘܬܪܐ ܕܢܫ̈ܐ ܕܒܝܬ ܢܗܪܝܢ
- Emblem of HSNB
- Dates active: September 2015 – present
- Allegiance: Syriac Union Party
- Headquarters: Al-Qahtaniyah, al-Hasakah Governorate, Syria
- Active regions: Al-Hasakah Governorate; Khabur River valley Raqqa Governorate
- Ideology: Dawronoye
- Part of: Syrian Democratic Forces; Syriac Military Council
- Wars: Syrian Civil War

The Bethnahrain Women's Protection Forces (Classical Syriac: ܚܝܠܘ̈ܬܐ ܕܣܘܬܪܐ ܕܢܫ̈ܐ ܕܒܝܬ ܢܗܪܝܢ, romanized: Ḥaylawotho d'Sutoro d'Neshe d'Beth Nahrin; HSNB) is an all-female Assyrian military and police organization based in al-Qahtaniyah, al-Hasakah Governorate, Syria.

HSNB was set up as a female brigade of the Syriac Military Council and assumes guard roles in areas where Assyrians reside.

HSNB includes military & police forces. The police section of HSNB has offices in Gozarto, likewise for the military section, academies & military points.

== History ==
The Bethnahrain Women's Protection Forces was formed on the first day of September 2015. During the announcement of the formation, the group declared that it will fight under the guidance of the Syriac Union Party, ally with the Assyrian group Sutoro, and "improve the values of Syriac people, women’s rights and to act with solidarity with other nations’ women and to struggle against the reactionarism."

On 6 November 2016, the HSNB announced that it would partake in the Raqqa offensive alongside the MFS and Kurdish and Arab forces of the Syrian Democratic Forces

== Ideology ==
The Bethnahrain Women's Protection Forces follow the Dawronoye ideology, a secular left-wing Assyrian nationalist movement tracing back to the 1980s in Midyat, Turkey.

Shamiran Shimon, the head of the Syriac Women's Union (SWU) in Syria, announced that the HSNB was to be formed as Assyrian women in Syria had been obscured and persecuted by the masculine communities in the region.

The HSNB was formed to guarantee equal rights for Assyrian women in Syria and counters the constraints religious figures in the region have placed on women and the ideals of feminism.

== See also ==
- Dawronoye
- Syrian Civil War
- Sutoro
