= Syriac Union Party (Lebanon) =

Syriac Union Party ܓܒܐ ܕܚܘܝܕܐ ܣܘܪܝܝܐ ܒܠܒܢܢ حزب الاتحاد السرياني
- Abbreviation: SUP
- Leader: Ibrahim Murad
- Founder: Ibrahim Murad
- Founded: 29 March 2005; 21 years ago
- Ideology: Assyrian minority rights Assyrian nationalism
- National affiliation: March 14 Alliance
- Parliament of Lebanon: 0 / 128
- Cabinet of Lebanon: 0 / 30

Website
- http://www.syriac-union.org/

The Syriac Union Party (Syriac: ܓܒܐ ܕܚܘܝܕܐ ܣܘܪܝܝܐ ܒܠܒܢܢ, Arabic: حزب الاتحاد السرياني) abbreviated as SUL is a Lebanese Assyrian political party established on 29 March 2005. It expresses points of view of the Assyrian minority community in Lebanon without any confessional differences between Syriac Orthodox or Syriac Catholic and is vocal in asking for independent seats for the Assyrians in the Lebanese Parliament, rather than confining them to the "minorities seat" in Beirut as is now the case.

The Syriac Union Party is headed by Ibrahim Murad, and is considered very close with the opposition of the 14 March alliance.

The party endorsed the Lebanese Forces in the 2022 parliamentary elections.

== See also ==
- Syriac Union Party (Syria)
- Syriac Military Council
