= Sootoro =

Assyrian/Syriac military organisation in Syria

Gozarto Protection Forces – Sootoro
- ܣܘܬܪܐ – ܚܝܠܘ̈ܬܐ ܕܣܘܬܪܐ ܕܓܙܪܬܐ
- Logos of the GPF (left) and Sootoro (right)
- Leader: Sargon Ibrahim
- Dates active: 2012–2024
- Allegiance: Ba'athist Syria
- Size: 500+ (2015) c. 300-400 (2017 estimate)
- Wars: the Syrian Civil War
- Website: Facebook

The Gozarto Protection Forces (Syriac: ܚܝܠܘ̈ܬܐ ܕܣܘܬܪܐ ܕܓܙܪܬܐ, Arabic: سوتورو, GPF) and Sootoro (Syriac: ܣܘܬܪܐ), united as one organisation, was an Assyrian regional militia based in Qamishli and Al-Hasakah Governorate, Syria. The force composed primarily of local Assyrians and some Armenians, founded after the outbreak of the Syrian Civil War that began in 2011. Sootoro claimed to be affiliated with the Civil Peace Committee for Syriac Orthodox. The Qamishli Sootoro was aligned with the Ba'athist government of Bashar al-Assad.

== History ==
The Qamishli Sootoro should not be confused with the Sutoro police force which has the same name in the Syriac language, but uses the English translation "Syriac Protection Office" and the transliteration and a different emblem. The Sutoro is associated with the Syriac Union Party and integrated in the administration of the Democratic Federation of Northern Syria.

In February 2013, the Qamishli branch of the Sutoro began open operations in the Christian neighbourhood of Wusta, which is located near the city centre and has an Assyrian/Syriac majority with a significant Armenian minority. Though it was initially organised by the Syriac Union Party, the Qamishli militia was subsequently brought under the control of a so-called "peace committee" composed of several Christian organisations from the city. The SUP soon lost virtually all influence on this group, which became seen by many SUP members as being controlled by agents of the Syrian government.

In late 2013, the split between this branch and the rest of the Sutoro became clear. Now transliterating its name as "Sootoro" (alternately referring to itself as the "Syriac Protection Office"), the militia in Qamishli adopted an entirely different logo and started openly asserting a separate identity. In November, the media office of the Qamishli Sootoro stated that it operated exclusively in the city of Qamishli and had not formed branches anywhere else, furthermore accusing militias outside the city of having appropriated their name. By December, the group was explicitly disavowing any connection to the SUP in their press releases. Though it continues to officially claim neutrality, the Qamishli Sootoro had become effectively a pro-government militia. Members of the group were frequently shown next to government flags and portraits of Bashar al-Assad in visual media, and flags bearing its distinct logo were seen at pro-Assad rallies in the government-controlled sector of the city.

Qamishli was one of the last places in northeast where government forces, having been pushed out of most of Hasakah Governorate by either rebel groups or the Kurdish-autonomist forces of the YPG, still maintained some presence. The Kurds control Kurdish populated districts of Qamishli, while Arab and Assyrian loyalist forces remained in majority-Arab and Assyrian districts in the south respectively, the city centre, the border crossing to Turkey, Qamishli Airport, and an army base on the southern outskirts. The assertion of loyalist control over the Qamishli militia had been identified as a potential effort by the government to strengthen its position in the city by expanding and solidifying its shrunken territorial holdings.

== Bibliography ==
- Rashid, Bedir Mulla (2018) [1st pub. 2017]. Military and Security Structures of the Autonomous Administration in Syria. Translated by Obaida Hitto. Istanbul: Omran for Strategic Studies. Archived from the original on 1 July 2018.

== See also ==
- Syriac Military Council
- Khabour Guards
- Sutoro
