= Syriac Military Council =

Syriac military organisation in Syria

- ܡܘܬܒܐ ܦܘܠܚܝܐ ܣܘܪܝܝܐ; Mawtbo Fulhoyo Suryoyo
- Official logo of the Syriac Military Council
- Leaders: Spokesman (until 2018): Kino Gabriel; Spokesman (until 2021): Abgar David; Spokesman (from 2021): Matay Hanna; Gewargis Hanna; Johan Cosar
- Dates active: 8 January 2013–30 August 2026
- Allegiance: Syriac Union Party
- Groups: Bethnahrain Women's Protection Forces; Special Forces unit
- Active regions: Al-Hasakah Governorate; Raqqa Governorate; Nineveh Governorate, Iraq; Gozarto Region
- Ideology: Dawronoye
- Size: 2,000+ (2015) c. 3,000+ (2017 estimate)
- Part of: Syrian Democratic Forces: Syriac-Assyrian Military Council
- Wars: the Syrian Civil War
- Website: https://twitter.com/SyriacMFS

The Syriac Military Council (Syriac: ܡܘܬܒܐ ܦܘܠܚܝܐ ܣܘܪܝܝܐ, romanized: Mawtbo Fulḥoyo Suryoyo, MFS; Arabic: المجلس العسكري السرياني السوري) was an Assyrian military organisation in Syria, part of the Syrian Democratic Forces. The establishment of the organisation was announced on 8 January 2013. According to the Syriac Military Council, the goal of the organisation is to stand up for the national rights of and to protect Assyrians in Syria. It operates mostly in the densely populated Assyrian areas of Al-Hasakah Governorate, and is affiliated to the Syriac Union Party.

On 16 December 2013, the Syriac Military Council announced the foundation of a new Military Academy named "Martyr Abgar". On December 24, the MFS released photographs showing its members in control of the Assyrian village of Ghardukah, located 8 kilometres (5.0 mi) south of Qahtaniyah (Tirbespiyê/Qabre Hewore). The village church had been completely destroyed by Jabhat al-Nusra, which occupied the hamlet before being expelled in mid-October during an operation launched by the People's Protection Units (YPG), in which MFS members may have participated. The Syriac Military Council established an all-female military and police unit called the Bethnahrain Women's Protection Forces in September 2015.

== History ==
=== Tell Brak & Tel Hamis operations (2013–14) ===
The MFS was a part of a YPG-led offensive against Jabhat al-Nusra and the Islamic State of Iraq and the Levant (ISIL), which began on 26 December 2013 in the Tel Hamis area. The YPG and MFS were unable to hold Tell Brak and failed to capture Tel Hamis, and the offensive was called off in early January. Tell Brak was captured on February 23 in a pre-dawn raid by the YPG and the Syriac Military Council.

=== June 2014 Syria–Iraq border offensive ===
MFS, along with YPG forces, participated in an offensive along the Syria-Iraq border. The joint forces managed to drive out Islamic State forces after the jihadist group had taken control of Mosul and most of Nineveh Governorate during the Northern Iraq offensive. The operation led to the full control of Til-Koçar.

=== August 2014 Sinjar offensive ===
The MFS, along with YPG forces and other allies, participated in an offensive against the Islamic State in the district of Sinjar in Iraq's province of Nineveh, to rescue 35,000 Yazidis in the Sinjar Mountains after the Sinjar massacre.

=== Khabur Valley operations (2015–16) ===
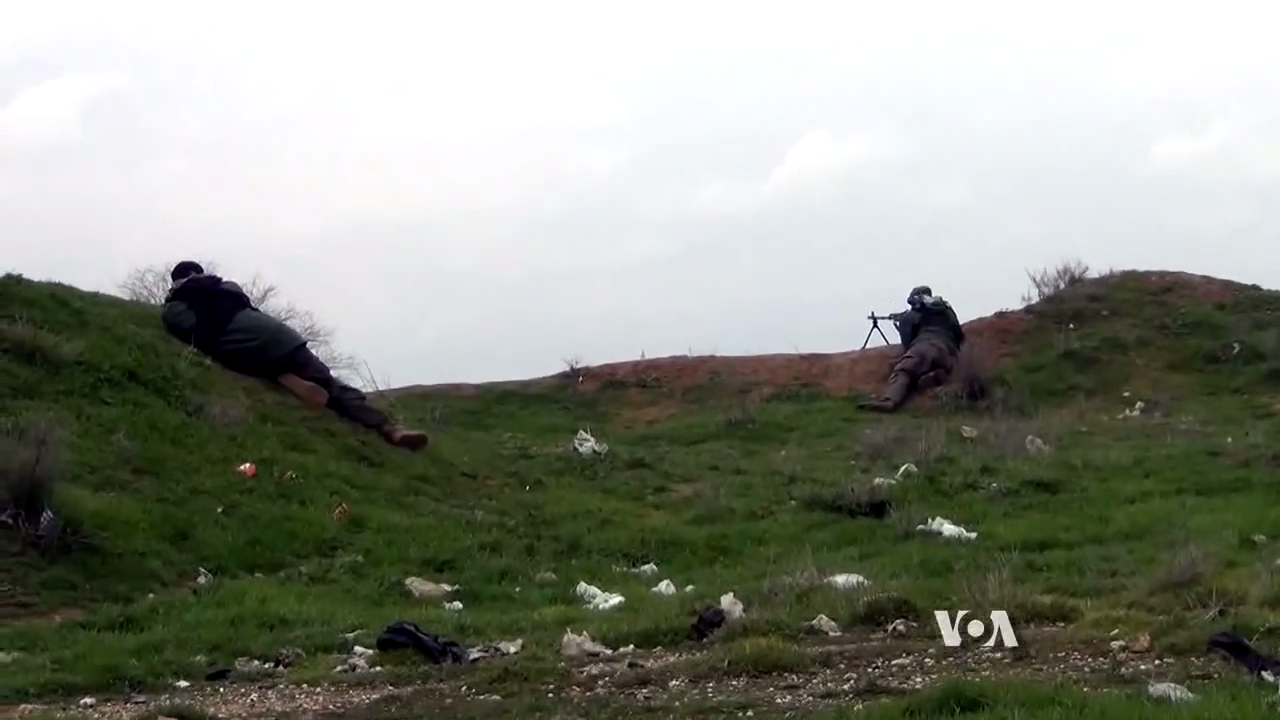
Syriac Military Council fighters near Tell Tamer, February 2015

the Islamic State launched a series of attacks in late February 2015 against Christian villages in the Khabur River valley, with the ultimate goal of capturing the strategic town of Tel Tamer, then under control of the YPG and MFS. In early March 2015, units of the Syriac Military Council and the YPG were involved in heavy clashes in the region, notably around the villages of Tel Nasri and Tel Mghas. On 15 March 2015, the Council reported it was in control of Tel Mghas.

On 11 October 2015, the Syriac Military Council became one of the founding groups in the Syrian Democratic Forces. On 31 October, the SDF launched an offensive southwards along the Khabur River. The SDF, which also includes the YPG, YPJ, MFS, al-Sanadid Forces, the Liberation Brigade, and the Army of Revolutionaries, captured the town of al-Hawl on 13 November. After the capture of al-Hawl, the SDF aimed to capture the town of al-Shaddadi further south.

On 16 February 2016, the Shaddadi offensive was launched by the SDF, which resulted in the SDF capture of the town and hundreds of other villages. During the offensive, ISIL released 42 Assyrian hostages they abducted during the Eastern al-Hasakah offensive in February 2015.

=== Raqqa (2016–17) ===
The Syriac Military Council along with the Bethnahrin Women's Protection Forces took part in the SDF's campaign to capture Raqqa from ISIL, declaring that "the fight against terrorism is the fight for existence of our Syriac–Assyrian people and we cannot rest until this fight is won." As of January 2017, 6 MFS fighters were killed during the Raqqa campaign.

On 22 January 2017, the European Syriac Union in Brussels requested the United States and its Trump administration to provide more support for the Assyrian and Kurdish components of the Syrian Democratic Forces. The US reportedly favoured the Arab components in the SDF. On 3 April, the MFS and the HSNB reaffirmed the request for more support from the US. In late 2017, the MFS forces under Abjer Abjer participated in the offensive to eliminate the last ISIL strongholds in Deir ez-Zor Governorate.

=== 2018 ===
On 20 January 2018, Kino Gabriel, the spokesman for the Syria Military Council was also made the spokesman for the SDF; he was succeeded as spokesman for MFS by Abgar David. The MFS also announced their intention to fight alongside the YPG/YPJ against the Turkish military operation in Afrin in early 2018, sending troops from al-Hasakah Governorate to Afrin. The MFS fighters who were still involved in the offensive against ISIL remained in Deir ez-Zor, however, "because our war with ISIS didn’t end". On 7 February 2018 a smaller contingent of MFS fighters arrived in Afrin.

=== 2019 ===
The MFS fought in the Battle of Baghuz Fawqani, the last phase of the Deir ez-Zor campaign against ISIL.

=== Syriac-Assyrian Military Council ===
On 6 July 2019, the MFS and Khabour Guards announced the formation of the Syriac-Assyrian Military Council (Arabic: المجلس العسكري السرياني الاشوري) in order to unify the Assyrian-Syriac military organizations within the Khabour region. The declaration said the military council would work within the political ideals of the Syriac Union Party and the Syrian Democratic Council.

== Flags ==
Flags of the Syriac Military Council
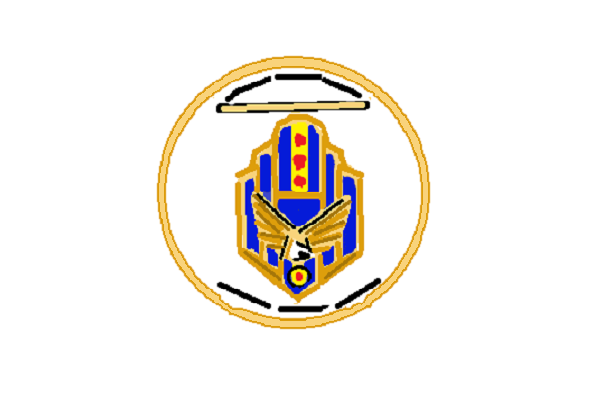
The flag of the MFS is their logo on a white field.

A tricolor used by the SUP and MFS representing Assyrians in SDF-controlled Northern Syria

== See also ==
- Bethnahrain Women's Protection Forces
- Sutoro
- Sootoro
- Khabour Guards
- Nattoreh
- Syriac Union Party (Syria)
- European Syriac Union
- Dawronoye
- Nineveh Plain Forces
- Nineveh Plain Protection Units
- List of armed groups in the Syrian Civil War
- Qaraqosh Protection Committee
