= Sutoro =

Sutoro ܣܘܬܪܐ
- Active: 2012–20 August 2026
- Country: Syria
- Allegiance: Syriac Union Party (Syria); Autonomous Administration of North and East Syria
- Type: Police
- Role: Close-quarters battle Crowd control Desert warfare Force protection HUMINT; Internal security Law enforcement Patrolling; Public security Raiding; Random checkpoint Surveillance; Urban warfare
- Size: 1,000+ (June 2013)
- Garrison/HQ: Al-Malikiyah, Hasakah Governorate, Syria
- Nickname: Sutoro
- Website: https://www.facebook.com/Sutoro.S.S.F/

Commanders
- General commander: Ashur Abu Sargon (2015)
- Spokesperson: Malik Rabo

The Syriac Security Office (Syriac: ܡܟܬܒܐ ܕܣܘܬܪܐ ܣܘܪܝܝܐ, romanized: Mawtbo d'Sutoro Suryoyo, Arabic: سوتورو), commonly known as the Sutoro or the Sutoro Police, is an Assyrian Christian police force in the Jazira Region of the Autonomous Administration of North and East Syria in Syria, where it works in concert with the general Asayish police force of the canton with the mission to police ethnic Assyrian areas and neighbourhoods. Its establishment is associated with the Syriac Union Party (SUP).

== History ==
=== Integration in the Rojava institutions ===
With the outbreak of the Syrian Civil War and the Rojava conflict, Sutoro units were first organized in town of al-Qahtaniyah (Qabre Hewore), and soon thereafter in al-Malikiyah (Dayrik). The Syriac Union Party maintains warm and friendly relations with its Kurdish neighbours, and it was one of numerous organizations to join the Kurdish Democratic Union Party (PYD) in establishing a formal administration for self-governance in northern Syria called Rojava. Following this policy, the Sutoro has sought to align itself with the Kurdish People's Defense Units (YPG) from an early juncture. Although the Kurds were initially suspicious when it started organizing and wanted its members to either disarm or join Kurdish formations, the Sutoro was soon accepted and welcomed by Kurdish forces. It became fully integrated in the administration of the Autonomous Administration of North and East Syria, operating alongside the general Rojavan Asayish police force, manning joint checkpoints and patrolling neighbourhoods together, while its paramilitary counterpart, the Syriac Military Council (MFS), joined an alliance with the YPG in January 2014.

=== Breakaway of group "Sootoro" ===
The Sutoro Police should not be confused with the Sootoro, which has the same name in the Syriac language, but uses the English translation "Syriac Protection Office" and the transliteration "Sootoro". This police organization in the city of Qamishli was originally founded as the local branch of the Sutero but in late 2013 broke away, turning itself into a militia aligned with the Ba'athist government of Bashar al-Assad. The Sutoro later founded a new branch in Qamishli.

== See also ==
- Syriac Military Council
- Syriac Union Party (Syria)
- European Syriac Union
- Dawronoye
- List of armed groups in the Syrian Civil War
- Qaraqosh Protection Committee
