= Syriac Union Party (Syria) =

Syriac Union Party ܓܒܐ ܕܚܘܝܕܐ ܣܘܪܝܝܐ حزب الإتحاد السرياني في سوريا
- President: Ishow Gowriye
- Founded: 1 October 2005
- Security wing: Sutoro
- Military wing: Syriac Military Council
- Female military wing: Bethnahrain Women's Protection Forces
- Ideology: Assyrian/Syriac Interests; Syrian federalism Dawronoye
- Political position: Left-wing
- National affiliation: National Coordination Committee for Democratic Change
- International affiliation: Mesopotamia National Council
- Colors: Red, yellow
- Democratic Council: 3 / 43

Website
- Facebook http://www.syriac-union.org

The Syriac Union Party (Syriac: ܓܒܐ ܕܚܘܝܕܐ ܣܘܪܝܝܐ, romanized: Gabo d'Ḥuyodo Suryoyo, Arabic: حزب الإتحاد السرياني في سوريا, SUP) is a secular Assyrian political party in Syria that represents the interests of Assyrians in Syria and is committed to the Dawronoye modernization ideology. Established on 1 October 2005, since the start of the Syrian Civil War it has positioned itself on the side of secular, democratic, socialist and federalist Kurdish forces in Rojava, skeptical of both the Ba'athist Syrian government of Bashar al-Assad and the National Coalition for Syrian Revolutionary and Opposition Forces. As of 2013, it was a member of the Syriac National Council of Syria (SSNC).

== Political role in Jazira Canton of Rojava ==
With the start of the Syrian Civil War in 2011, the Syriac Union Party aligned itself with the Kurdish Democratic Union Party (PYD), with which it shares a secular, pro-modernization and direct democracy based ideology. It has three deputies in the Syrian Democratic Council, the legislature of the Autonomous Administration of North and East Syria.

The Syriac Union Party has set up the Syriac Military Council militia as well as the Sutoro police force to protect Assyrian communities in their settlement areas in northeast Syria. Sutoro are integrated with the general Asayish police force of Jazira Region of the Democratic Federation of Northern Syria, however the Qamishli branch later broke away to align itself with the Assad government under the name of Sootoro. The Syriac Military Council has co-operated closely with the mainly Kurdish People's Defense Units (YPG) and later became part of the Syrian Democratic Forces (SDF).

The Deputy Prime Minister of the region is Syriac Christian Elizabeth Gawrie.

== Persecution by the Assad government ==
The Syriac Union Party has been subject to continued repression by the Assad government during the civil war, despite being part of the nonviolent and officially-tolerated domestic opposition National Coordination Body. On 6 June 2013, government forces raided the Qamishli home of SUP Executive Committee member Rubel Gabriel Bahho, arresting and subsequently imprisoning him. On 12 August 2013, security forces apprehended SUP vice-president Sait Malki Cosar—the father of Sutoro leader Johann Cosar—as he disembarked at Qamishli Airport following a visit to Switzerland, where he holds dual citizenship. After being detained in Qamishli for several days, Cosar was transferred to a prison near Damascus and contact with him was lost. Neither party official is known to have been formally charged or tried in court, and neither has been released or heard from since their imprisonment. Their fates remain unknown as of February 2014.

Cosar is rumoured to have died under shadowy circumstances while in custody. The government produced a death certificate for Cosar that stated he died in Damascus of supposed "cardiac arrest" at either 10:00 or 10:25 PM on the day of his arrest, even though his flight did not even land in Qamishli until 10:30 PM. But despite requests from both the SUP and Cosar's family, government officials have refused to release his body. Cosar's relatives reportedly managed to track down the doctors in Damascus who signed the death certificate, who told them that the government frequently forces doctors to sign death certificates for detainees without allowing them to even see a corpse. Friends, family members, and party colleagues alike believe that Cosar may still be alive, and have alleged that the government is trying to conceal the fact that he has been tortured in custody.

== Post-Assad Syria ==
The Syriac Union Party welcomed the 10 March 2025 agreement between the Syrian transitional government of President Ahmed al-Sharaa and the Syrian Democratic Forces commander Mazloum Abdi as "a genuine and correct beginning" towards building inclusive institutions, but criticised it for passing over Syriac-Assyrian rights and aspirations. Amid the Syrian government's 2026 offensive against the SDF, party co-chair Sanharib Barsom called on the government to return to negotiations and described its military advances as a "victory for external actors who do not wish Syria well". He criticised the government for failing to meet its March 2025 commitments, for its use of force and for "pursuing a centralized approach similar to that of the former regime", and pledged to continue the struggle for "the full realization of Syriac rights in a new Syria".

== Activities in Europe ==
On 15 August 2012, members of Syriac Union Party stormed the Syrian embassy in Stockholm in protest of the Syrian government. A dozen of its members were later detained by Swedish police.

== See also ==
- Syriac Union Party (Lebanon)
- Syriac Military Council
- Sutoro
