= Kurdistan Region =

Kurdistan Region: هەرێمی کوردستان (Sorani Kurdish) Herêmî Kurdistan; هەرێما کوردستانێ (Kurmanji Kurdish) Herêma Kurdistanê; إقليم كردستان (Arabic) Iqlīm Kurdistān
- Federal region
- Flag Emblem
- Anthem: ئەی ڕەقیب; Ey Reqîb "Oh, enemy!"
- Territory controlled by the Kurdistan Region Rest of Iraq
- Country: Iraq
- Autonomy founded: 19 May 1992
- Federal region established: 15 October 2005
- Capital: Erbil; 36°04′59″N 44°37′47″E
- Official languages: Kurdish; Arabic
- Recognised regional languages: Armenian; Assyrian; Turkmen (Note: Official in administrative districts with high number of speakers, the written language of the Iraqi Turkmen is based on Istanbul Turkish using the modern Turkish alphabet.)
- Ethnic groups: Predominantly Kurds; Minorities of Arabs, Iraqi Turkmens, Assyrians and Armenians
- Religion: Majority: Islam; Minority: Yazidism, Yarsanism, Christianity other
- Demonym(s): Kurd; Kurdistani
- Government: Semi-autonomous parliamentary government within a federal parliamentary republic
  - President: Nechirvan Barzani
  - Vice President: Jaafar Sheikh Mustafa; Mustafa Said Qadir
  - Prime Minister: Masrour Barzani
  - Deputy Prime Minister: Qubad Talabani
- Legislature: Kurdistan Region Parliament
- Judiciary: Kurdistan Region Judicial Council

Area
  - Total: 46,862 km^{2} (18,094 sq mi)

Population
  - 2024 census: 6,370,668
- GDP (PPP): 2022 estimate
  - Total: $66 billion
  - Per capita: $7,038
- Gini (2012): 32 medium
- HDI (2014): 0.750 high
- Currency: Iraqi dinar
- Time zone: UTC+3 (AST)
- Date format: dd/mm/yyyy
- Driving side: Right
- Calling code: +964
- ISO 3166 code: IQ-KR
- Internet TLD: .krd

The Kurdistan Region (KRI) (Note: Sorani Kurdish: هەرێمی کوردستان, romanized: Herêmî Kurdistan Kurmanji Kurdish: هەرێما کوردستانێ, romanized: Herêma Kurdistanê Arabic: إقليم كردستان, romanized: Iqlīm Kurdistān) is a semi-autonomous (Note: Attributable to several sources:) federal region (Note: Arabic: اقليم اتحادي, romanized: Iqlīm Ittiḥādī) of the Republic of Iraq. It comprises four Kurdish-majority governorates of Arab-majority Iraq: Erbil Governorate, Sulaymaniyah Governorate, Duhok Governorate, and Halabja Governorate. It is located in northern Iraq, which shares borders with Iran to the east, Turkey to the north, and Syria to the west.

It does not govern all of Iraqi Kurdistan and lays claim to the disputed territories of northern Iraq; these territories have a predominantly non-Arab population and were subject to the Ba'athist Arabization campaigns throughout the late 20th century. These northern territories remain contested between the Kurdistan Regional Government (in Erbil) and the Government of Iraq (in Baghdad) to the present day. The Kurdistan Region Parliament is based in Erbil, the capital of KRI.

Throughout the 20th century, Iraqi Kurds oscillated between fighting for autonomy and for full independence. Under the Ba'athist regime, the Kurds experienced Arabization and genocidal campaigns at the hands of the government in Baghdad. However, when the United States, the United Kingdom, and France established the Iraqi no-fly zones, which restricted the Iraqi government's power in the country's northern areas following the Gulf War and 1991 Iraqi uprisings, the Kurds were able to establish self-governance and the autonomous region was de facto established in 1992. The Iraqi government only recognized the Kurdistan Region as a federal region in 2005, after the American-led 2003 invasion of Iraq overthrew Saddam Hussein and a federal, democratic Iraqi constitution was adopted. The KRI largely escaped the privations that afflicted other parts of Iraq in the last years of Saddam Hussein's rule as well as the chaos that followed his ousting during the Iraq War (2003–2011), and built a parliamentary democracy with a growing economy. In 2014, when the Syria-based Islamic State invaded the north of the country, the Iraqi Armed Forces retreated from most of northern and western Iraq, including the disputed territories, leading to the KRI's Peshmerga to enter and take control of these areas for the duration of the War in Iraq (2013–2017). In September 2017, the KRI held a non-binding independence referendum, which drew mixed international reactions. As a result, in October 2017, the Iraqi Armed Forces moved against the Peshmerga and reasserted control over most of the disputed territories, forcing KRI to concede to Baghdad's demands. The failed independence referendum and subsequent punitive measures against it have had significant adverse effects for Kurdistan Region, resulting in a significant erosion of its autonomy.

== History ==
=== Early struggle for independence (1923–1975) ===
Before Iraq became an independent state in 1923, the Iraqi Kurds had already begun their independence struggle from the British Mandatory Iraq with the Mahmud Barzanji revolts, which were subsequently crushed by the United Kingdom after a bombing campaign against Kurdish civilians by the Royal Air Force. Nonetheless, the Kurdish struggle persisted and the Barzani tribe had by the early 1920s gained momentum for the Kurdish nationalist cause and would become pivotal in the Kurdish-Iraqi wars throughout the 20th century. In 1943, the Barzani chief Mustafa Barzani began raiding Iraqi police stations in Kurdistan, which led the Baghdad government to deploy 30,000 troops to the region. The Iraqi Kurdish leadership fled to Iran in 1945. There, Mustafa Barzani founded the Kurdistan Democratic Party, and Iran and the Soviet Union began assisting the Kurdish rebels with arms. Israel began assisting the Kurdish rebels in the early 1960s.

From 1961 to 1970, the Kurds fought the Iraqi government in the First Iraqi–Kurdish War, which resulted in the Iraqi–Kurdish Autonomy Agreement. But simultaneously with its promise of Kurdish autonomy, the Iraqi government began ethnic cleansing Kurdish-populated areas, to reduce the size of the autonomous entity which a census would determine. This mistrust provoked the Second Iraqi–Kurdish War between 1974 and 1975, which resulted in a serious defeat for the Iraqi Kurds (see Algiers Accord) and forced all of the rebels to flee once more to Iran.

=== Insurgency and first elections (1975–1992) ===
The Patriotic Union of Kurdistan (PUK) was founded in 1975 by Jalal Talabani while the Kurdistan Democratic Party (KDP) was slowly recovering from their defeat. The PUK was more popular among left-wing Sorani speakers, while the KDP was more popular among right-wing Kurmanji speakers. The PUK leadership adhered to the Qadiri sect while the KDP leadership adhered to the Naqshbandi. The Kurdish insurgency became entangled in the Iran–Iraq War from 1980 onwards. During the first years of the war in the early 1980s, the Iraqi government tried to accommodate the Kurds in order to focus on the war against Iran. In 1983, the Patriotic Union of Kurdistan agreed to cooperate with Baghdad, but the Kurdistan Democratic Party remained opposed. In 1983, Saddam Hussein signed an autonomy agreement with Jalal Talabani of the PUK, though Saddam later reneged on the agreement.

By 1985, the PUK and KDP had joined forces, and Iraqi Kurdistan saw widespread guerrilla warfare up to the end of the war. On 15 March 1988, PUK forces captured the town of Halabja near the Iranian border and inflicted heavy losses among Iraqi soldiers. The Iraqis retaliated the following day by chemically bombing the town, killing about 5,000 civilians. This led the Americans and the Europeans to implement the Iraqi no-fly zones in March 1991 to protect the Kurds, thereby facilitating Kurdish autonomy amid the vacuum and the first Kurdish elections were consequently held in May 1992, wherein the Kurdistan Democratic Party secured 45.3% of the vote and a majority of seats.

=== Nascent autonomy, war and political turmoil (1992–2009) ===
The two parties agreed to form the first Kurdish cabinet led by PUK politician Fuad Masum as Prime Minister in July 1992 and the main focus of the new cabinet was to mitigate the effect of the American-led sanctions on Iraq and to prevent internal Kurdish skirmishes. Nonetheless, the cabinet broke down due to plagues of embattlement and technocracy which disenfranchised the Patriotic Union of Kurdistan and a new more partisan cabinet was formed and led by PUK politician Kosrat Rasul Ali in April 1993. The KDP-PUK relations quickly deteriorated and the first clashes in the civil war took place in May 1994 when PUK captured the towns of Shaqlawa and Chamchamal from KDP, which in turn pushed PUK out of Salahaddin (near Erbil). In September 1998, the United States mediated a ceasefire and the two warring parties signed the Washington Agreement deal, where in it was stipulated that the two parties would agree on revenue-sharing, power-sharing and security arrangements.

The anarchy in Kurdistan during the war created an opportunity for the Kurdistan Workers' Party (PKK), which created bases in the northern mountainous areas of the Kurdistan Region, which still operates in the Region in the 2010s with frequent calls for withdrawal.

In advance of the Iraq war in 2003, the two parties united in the negotiations with the Arab opposition to Saddam Hussein and succeeded in harvesting political, economic, and security gains and the Arab opposition agreed to recognize Kurdish autonomy in the case that Saddam Hussein was removed from power. America and Kurdistan also jointly rooted out the Islamist Ansar al-Islam group in Halabja area as Kurdistan hosted thousands of soldiers. The Kurdish autonomy which had existed since 1992 was formally recognized by the new Iraqi government in 2005 in the new Iraqi constitution and the KDP- and PUK-administered areas reunified in 2006, making the Kurdistan Region into one single administration. This reunification prompted Kurdish leaders and the Kurdish President Masoud Barzani to focus on bringing the Kurdish areas outside of the Kurdistan Region into the region and building healthy institutions.

In 2009, Kurdistan saw the birth of a new major party, the Gorran Movement, which was founded because of tensions in PUK and would subsequently weaken the party profoundly. The second most important political PUK figure, Nawshirwan Mustafa, was the founder of Gorran, who took advantage of sentiments among many PUK politicians critical of the cooperation with the KDP. Gorran would subsequently win 25 seats (or 23.7% of the votes) in the 2009 parliamentary elections to the detriment of the Kurdistan List. In the aftermath of the elections, Gorran failed at its attempts to persuade the Kurdistan Islamic Group and Kurdistan Islamic Union to leave the Kurdistan List, provoking both KDP and PUK. Gorran also attempted to create goodwill with the Iraqi Prime Minister Nouri al-Maliki, which only aggravated the situation in Kurdistan, and the KDP and PUK chose to boycott Gorran from politics.

=== Conflict with the Islamic State (2014–2017) ===
In the period leading up to the Islamic State invasion of Iraq in June 2014, the Iraqi-Kurdish relations were in a decline that the war against the Islamic State only worsened. When Iraqi forces withdrew from the Syrian-Iraqi border and away from the disputed areas, the Kurdistan Region consequently had a 1,000 km front with the Islamic State, which put the region into an economic stalemate. However, Kurdistan did not compromise on their stance regarding financial independence from Baghdad. Due to the Iraqi withdrawal, Kurdish Peshmerga took control of most disputed areas, including Kirkuk, Khanaqin, Jalawla, Bashiqa, Sinjar and Makhmur. The strategically important Mosul Dam was also captured by Kurdish forces.

=== Independence referendum and conflict with Iraq (2017–present) ===
The referendum was a failed bid at Kurdish independence from the Republic of Iraq. It was held on 25 September 2017 in Kurdistan Region, with preliminary results showing approximately 92.73 percent of votes cast in favor of independence. Despite reporting that the independence referendum would be non-binding, the Kurdistan Regional Government (KRG) characterized it as binding, although they claimed that an affirmative result would trigger the start of state building and negotiations with Iraq rather than an immediate declaration of independence of Kurdistan. The referendum's legality was rejected by the Federal government of Iraq and the Federal Supreme Court. The referendum prompted a military confrontation, and after their defeat, KRG eventually conceded and accepted the Supreme Court's ruling that no Iraqi governorate is allowed to secede.

It was originally planned to be held in 2014 amidst controversy and dispute between the regional and federal governments. Calls for Kurdish independence had been going on for years, with an unofficial 2005 referendum resulting in 98.98% voting in favor of independence. These longstanding calls gained impetus following the Northern Iraq offensive by Islamic State in Iraq and the Levant during the Iraqi Civil War in which Baghdad-controlled forces abandoned some areas, which were then taken by the Peshmerga and controlled de facto by the Kurds.

The referendum was announced and delayed on several occasions as Kurdish forces co-operated with the Iraqi central government for the liberation of Mosul, but by April 2017, it was being seen as happening some time in 2017. On 7 June 2017, Kurdish President Masoud Barzani held a meeting with the Kurdistan Democratic Party (KDP), the Patriotic Union of Kurdistan (PUK), and other ruling parties, where the independence referendum was confirmed to be held on 25 September 2017.

The referendum led to a military conflict with the Iraqi central government, in which the KRG lost 40 percent of its territory and its main source of revenue, the Kirkuk oil fields. Following the loss, Kurdistan Region president Masoud Barzani resigned and the referendum was thus effectively abandoned.

As of 2019, the Kurdistan Region and the Federal Government in Baghdad are negotiating over joint control for the disputed areas as their relations have become more cordial in the aftermath of the Islamic State's defeat in the ISIS war.

== Geography ==
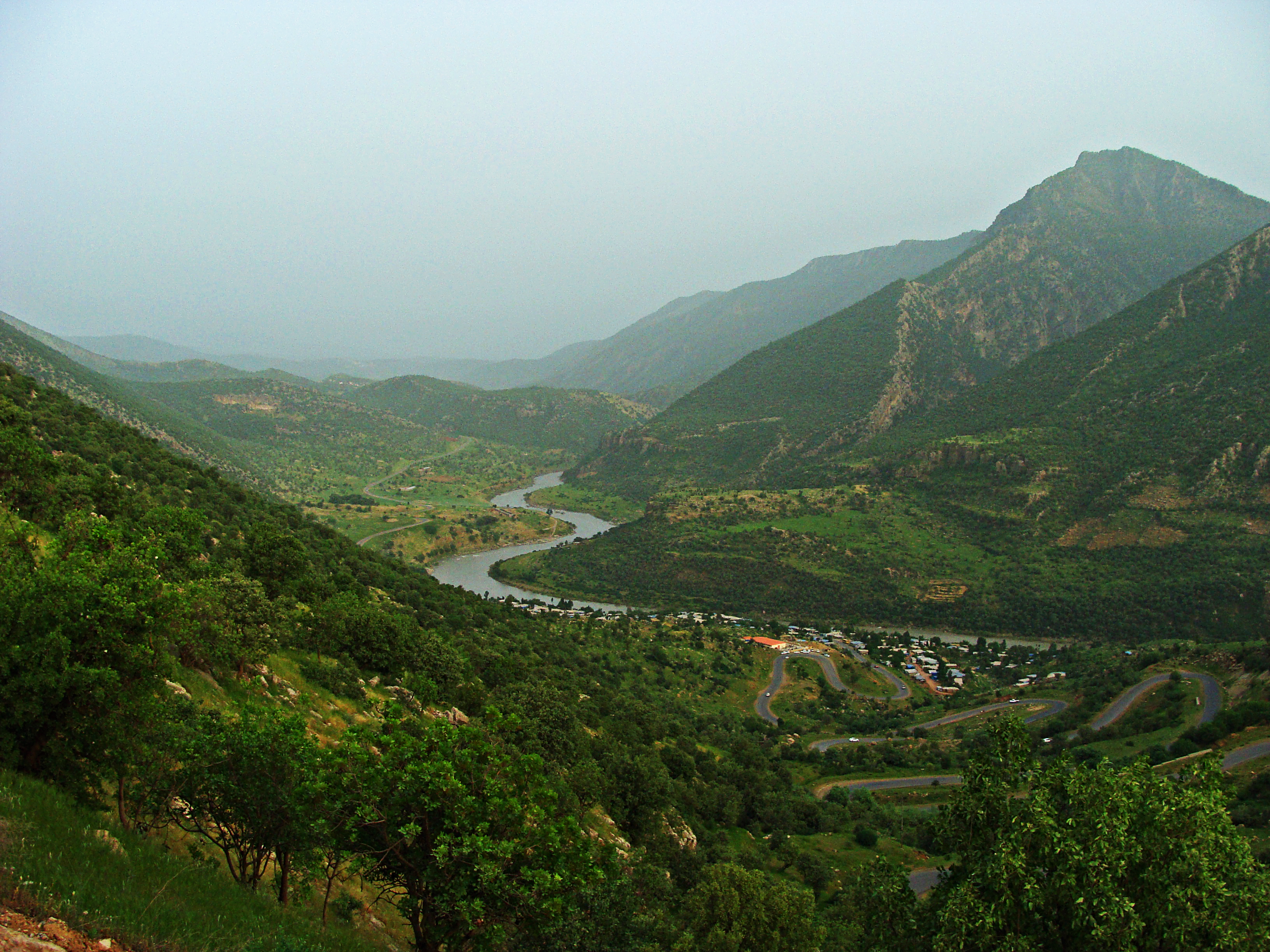
A valley in the north of the region, through which the Great Zab flows

The Kurdistan region is located in northern Iraq. It borders Iran in the east, Turkey in the north, and Syria in the west. The region encompasses most of Iraqi Kurdistan, which is the southern part of the greater geographical region of Kurdistan. The region lies between latitudes 34° and 38°N, and longitudes 41° and 47°E. Most of the northern and northeastern parts of the region are mountainous, especially those bordering Turkey and Iran. The region has several high mountains and mountain ranges. Other areas of the region are hills and plains, which make up the central and most southern parts of the region.

Most of the precipitation there falls as rain or snow between November and April, annual precipitation ranges from about 375 to 724 mm. From ancient times this has made cultivation of winter crops (and vegetables and fruit in the summer) and the raising of livestock possible.

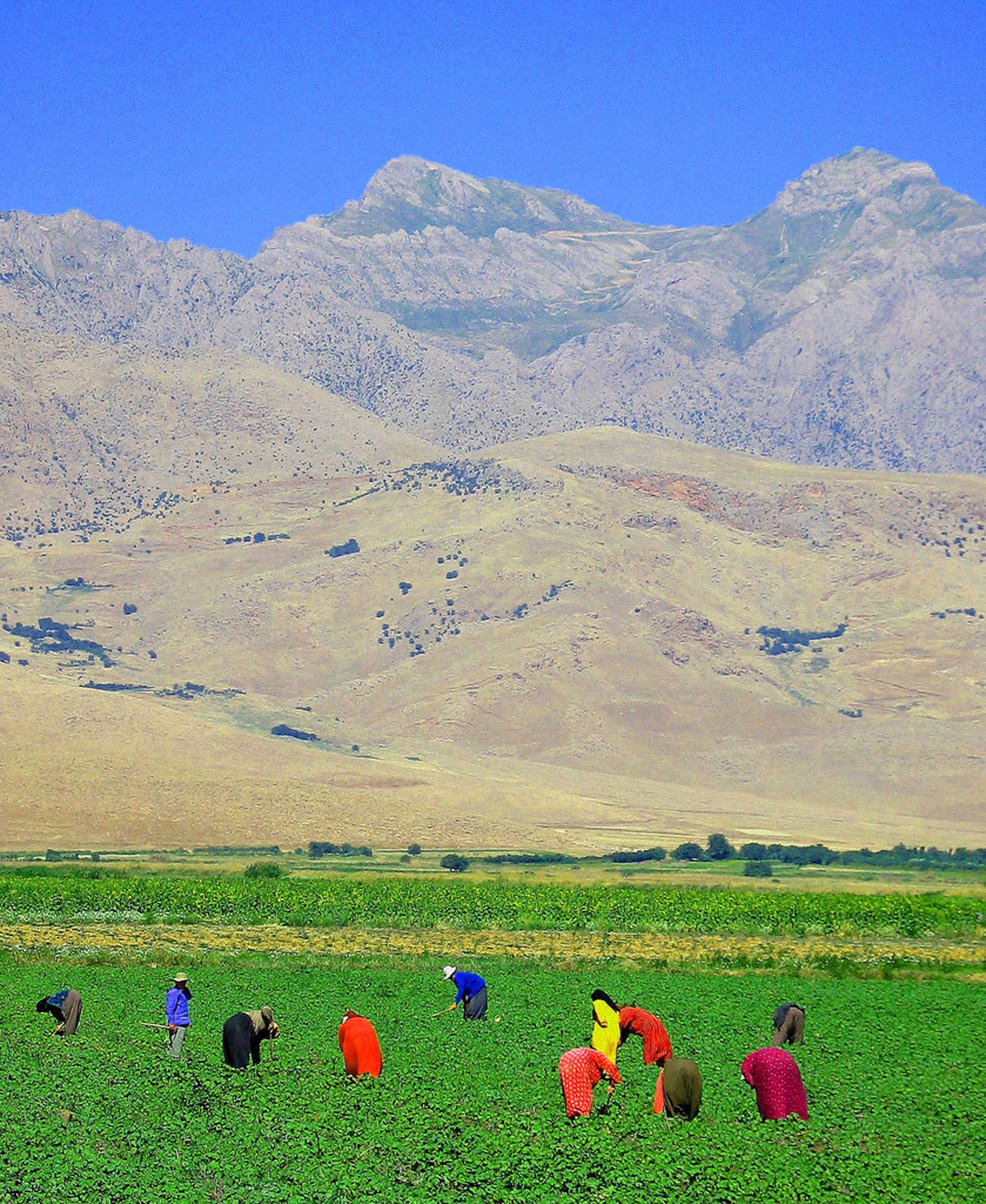
Kurdish villagers working in a field

Around 1,368,388 hectares (33%) of the land is rainfed arable agricultural land and 328,428 hectares (8%) is Irrigated arable agricultural land.

=== Climate ===
The climate of the Kurdistan Region is semi-arid continental; hot and dry in summer, and cold and wet in winter. The region is cooler compared to the central and southern parts of Iraq.

Summers are hot and dry, with high average temperatures ranging from 35 °C (95 °F) in the cooler northernmost areas to blistering 40 °C (104 °F) in the southwest, with lows around 21 °C (70 °F) to 24 °C (75 °F). Winter is dramatically cooler than the rest of Iraq, with highs averaging between 9 °C (48 °F) and 11 °C (52 °F) and with lows hovering around 3 °C (37 °F) in some areas and freezing in others, dipping to −2 °C (28 °F) and 0 °C (32 °F) on average.

Climate data for Erbil
Month	Jan	Feb	Mar	Apr	May	Jun	Jul	Aug	Sep	Oct	Nov	Dec	Year
Record high °C (°F)	20 (68)	27 (81)	30 (86)	34 (93)	42 (108)	44 (111)	48 (118)	49 (120)	45 (113)	39 (102)	31 (88)	24 (75)	49 (120)
Mean daily maximum °C (°F)	12.4 (54.3)	14.2 (57.6)	18.1 (64.6)	24.0 (75.2)	31.5 (88.7)	38.1 (100.6)	42.0 (107.6)	41.9 (107.4)	37.9 (100.2)	30.7 (87.3)	21.2 (70.2)	14.4 (57.9)	27.2 (81.0)
Daily mean °C (°F)	7.4 (45.3)	8.9 (48.0)	12.4 (54.3)	17.5 (63.5)	24.1 (75.4)	29.7 (85.5)	33.4 (92.1)	33.1 (91.6)	29.0 (84.2)	22.6 (72.7)	15.0 (59.0)	9.1 (48.4)	20.2 (68.3)
Mean daily minimum °C (°F)	2.4 (36.3)	3.6 (38.5)	6.7 (44.1)	11.1 (52.0)	16.7 (62.1)	21.4 (70.5)	24.9 (76.8)	24.4 (75.9)	20.1 (68.2)	14.5 (58.1)	8.9 (48.0)	3.9 (39.0)	13.2 (55.8)
Record low °C (°F)	−4 (25)	−6 (21)	−1 (30)	3 (37)	6 (43)	10 (50)	13 (55)	17 (63)	11 (52)	4 (39)	−2 (28)	−2 (28)	−6 (21)
Average rainfall mm (inches)	111 (4.4)	97 (3.8)	89 (3.5)	69 (2.7)	26 (1.0)	0 (0)	0 (0)	0 (0)	0 (0)	12 (0.5)	56 (2.2)	80 (3.1)	540 (21.2)
Average rainy days	9	9	10	9	4	1	0	0	1	3	6	10	62
Average snowy days	1	0	0	0	0	0	0	0	0	0	0	0	1
Average relative humidity (%)	74.5	70	65	58.5	41.5	28.5	25	27.5	30.5	43.5	60.5	75.5	50.0
Source 1: Climate-Data.org, My Forecast for records, humidity, snow and precipitation days
Source 2: What's the Weather Like.org, Erbilia

=== Biodiversity ===
Vegetation in the region includes Abies cilicica, Quercus calliprinos, Quercus brantii, Quercus infectoria, Quercus ithaburensis, Quercus macranthera, Cupressus sempervirens, Platanus orientalis, Pinus brutia, Juniperus foetidissima, Juniperus excelsa, Juniperus oxycedrus, Salix alba, Olea europaea, Ficus carica, Populus euphratica, Populus nigra, Crataegus monogyna, Crataegus azarolus, cherry plum, rose hips, pistachio trees, pear and Sorbus graeca. The desert in the south is mostly steppe and would feature xeric plants such as palm trees, tamarix, date palm, fraxinus, poa, white wormwood and chenopodiaceae.

Animals found in the region include the Syrian brown bear, wild boar, gray wolf, golden jackal, Indian crested porcupine, red fox, goitered gazelle, Eurasian otter, striped hyena, Persian fallow deer, onager, mangar and the Euphrates softshell turtle.

Bird species include, the see-see partridge, Menetries's warbler, western jackdaw, Red-billed chough, hooded crow, European nightjar, rufous-tailed scrub robin, masked shrike and the pale rockfinch.

== Government and politics ==
The Constitution of Iraq, which is based on a decentralized federal system, recognizes the Kurdistan Region as a federal region while preserving its existing authorities established in 1992. These include the Kurdistan Regional Government (KRG), with its legislative, executive, and judicial branches. It is Iraq's only federal region and, as such, its most autonomous entity. As a federal region it has residual powers (Article 115), in every area that is not exlusive to the federal government of Iraq (Article 110). The spectrum of federally exclusive powers is relatively limited (see list of exclusive powers). In addition, the Kurdistan Region shares responsibility with the federal government in certain areas, such as health policy, education, and the regulation and distribution of electric energy (Article 114). However, in the event of a conflict, regional laws concerning these areas prevail over federal laws. Despite this constitutional framework, ambiguities in the articles and unaddressed issues have led to differing interpretations and disputes between the KRG and the federal government over the scope of their respective authorities, fueled by mutual distrust. Contested areas include aspects of foreign policy, customs policy, territorial control, the region's share of the national budget, and, most prominently, energy policy, including the management of oil and gas. The Kurdistan Region has frequently pursued policies independently and against the "will" of the federal government, seeking to maximize its autonomy, while the federal government has sought to centralize control in an attempt to "dismant[le] [...] Iraqi federalism." As a result, the Kurdistan Region's degree of autonomy has varied over time, reaching a peak in 2017 after several years of unhindered independent oil exports. At various points, the Kurdistan Region was described as a quasi-state, de-facto state, proto-state or statelet, while some scholars argued that it often functioned similarly to an independent state. It has also been argued that the Kurdistan Region meets the criteria for statehood under the Montevideo Convention. After the failed 2017 Kurdistan Region independence referendum, pressure exerted by the federal government in the contested areas "arguably left the [Kurdistan Region] in its weakest position since before the 1991 Gulf War." Since 2017, there has been a gradual erosion of Kurdistan Region's autonomy driven by a concerted political, economic and legal effort by the Iraqi government and the judiciary in centralising authority.

Formally, the Kurdistan Region's political system has adopted aspects of a parliamentary democracy, but in practice it operates as a hybrid system, as the separation of powers is vague and the executive holds significant powers. The system has been variously described as a "quasi-presidential system" and a "hybrid formula of parliamentary [government]", while the 2009 draft Constitution of the Kurdistan Region envisaged a presidential system. The hybrid political system results primarily from the lack of a regional constitution, but also from the two-party dominance, informal power structures, and historical and external pressures.

=== Legislature ===
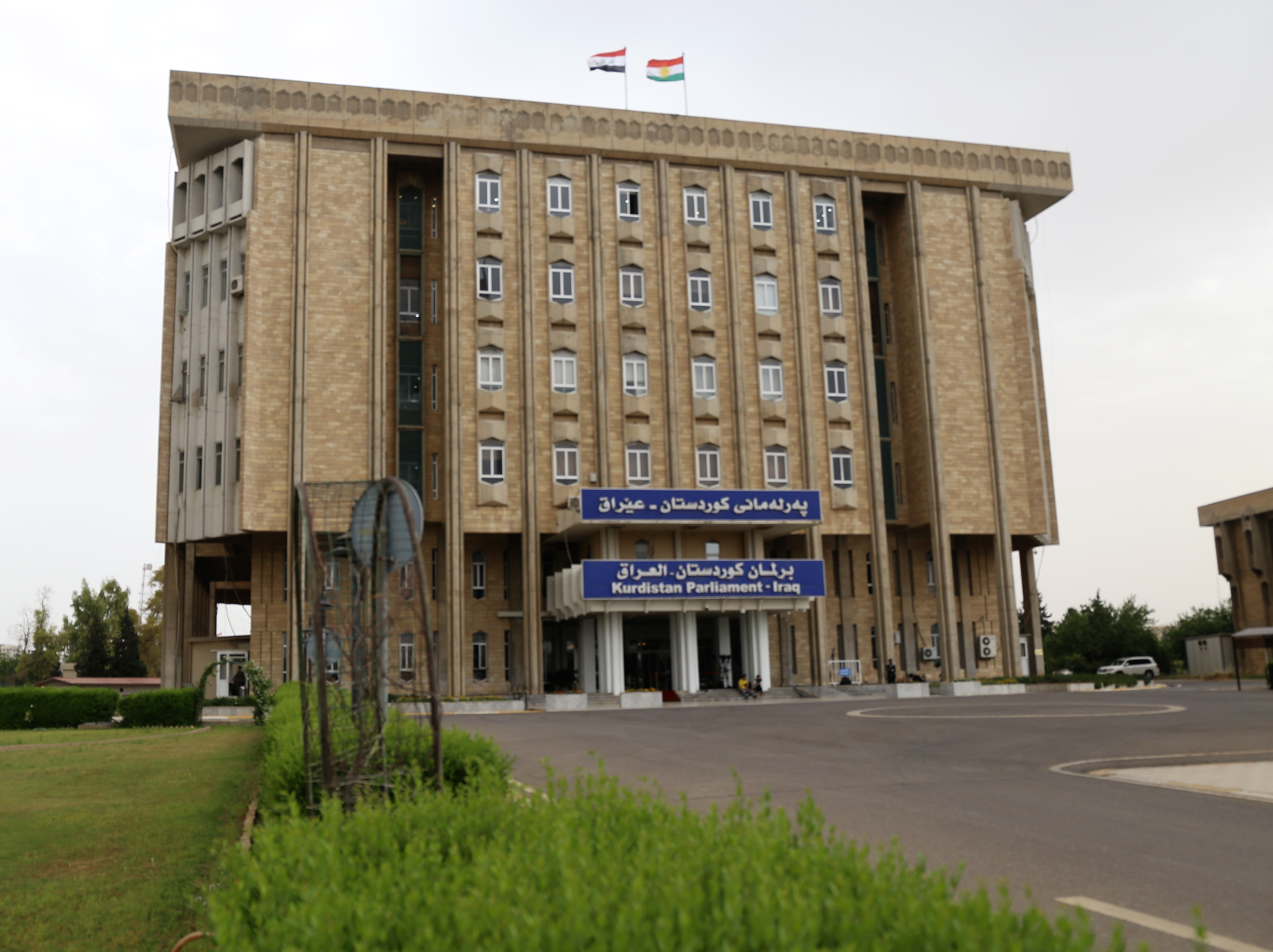
Exterior of the Kurdistan Parliament, Erbil

The Kurdistan Region Parliament, formerly known as Kurdistan National Assembly, is the regional legislature responsible for legislation, appointing the President, granting or withdrawing confidence from ministers, and approving the budget. It has 100 members, at least 30% of whom must be women, and they are elected democratically for four-year terms. As per Article 36 of the Kurdistan Parliamentary Election Law, five seats are reserved for Chaldeans and Assyrians, five for Turkmens, and one for Armenians. The Parliament is supported by the Kurdistan Parliament's Research Centre, which provides research to support the legislative, monitoring, and representation work of MPs and strengthens parliamentary administrative staff.

Through the latest parliamentary election, the following political parties are represented in the Kurdistan Parliament: Kurdistan Democratic Party (KDP), Patriotic Union of Kurdistan (PUK), New Generation Movement (NGM), Kurdistan Islamic Union, National Stance Movement, Kurdistan Justice Group, People's Front, Kurdistan Social Democratic Party (KSDP), and Gorran Movement.

=== Executive ===
Seal of the President of the Kurdistan Region

Coat of arms of the Kurdistan Regional Government

The President of the Kurdistan Region is elected by the parliament and functions as head of state and government, specifically of the Kurdistan Regional Government (KRG). The President holds significant powers compared to the other branches and until 2018 has been regarded as the main source of political power in the region. They may serve two four-year terms and must ratify laws before they take effect, although the parliament can override any revisions. The current President is Nechirvan Barzani (KDP), who assumed office on 1 June 2019.

The Prime Minister of the Kurdistan Region heads the cabinet, known as the Council of Ministers. Some positions within the cabinet are reserved for women and minority groups. Since 2018, the office of the Prime Minister has been regarded as the main source of political power in the region. The current Prime Minister is Masrour Barzani (KDP), who took office in 2019. Cabinet seats were previously shared equally between the KDP and PUK, but the KDP opposes continuing this ratio due to its larger parliamentary representation.

=== Judiciary ===
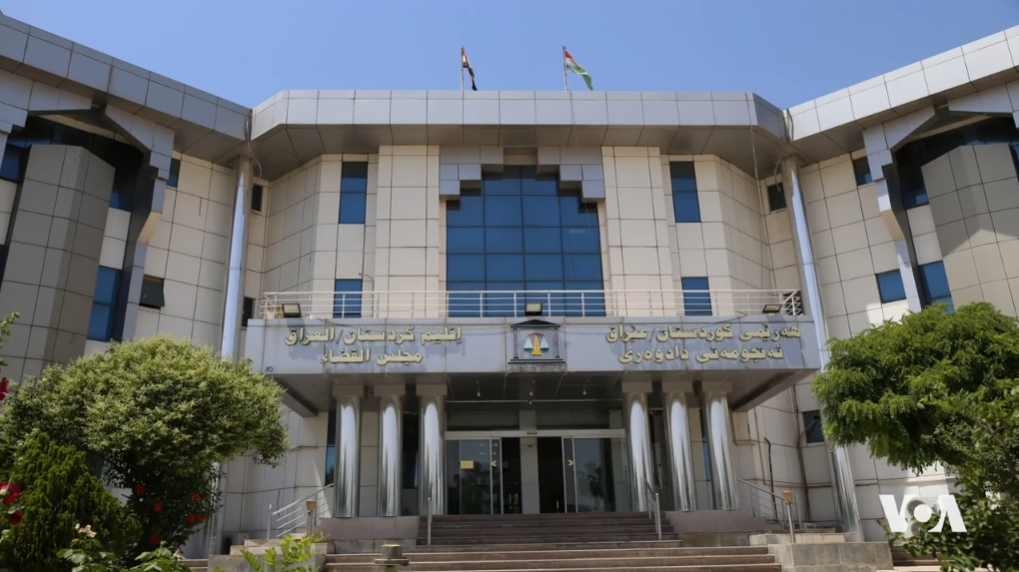
Entrance to the main building of the Kurdistan Judicial Council in Erbil.

The Kurdistan Judicial Council (KJC) was established under Judicial Authority Law No. 14 of 1992 and is the highest judicial authority in the KRI. Several lower-lever appellate courts exist throughout the KRI. The judiciary is further supplemented by the Public Prosecutor's Office, and an independent Shura Council, which falls administratively under the KRG's Ministry of Justice and issues advisory opinions on administrative disputes, as well as reviewing draft legislation and regulations. The KRI lacks a regional constitutional court, as no regional constitution has been adopted.

=== Constitution ===
Presidential Decision No. 5 of 2009 approving the 2009 draft Constitution of the Kurdistan Region, which was ratified by the Kurdistan Parliament in Decision No. 8 of 2009. A planned referendum was deferred amid disputes between Erbil and Baghdad and U.S. calls to stand down.

The Kurdistan Region operates without a written regional constitution, although Article 120 of the 2005 Iraqi Constitution allows federal regions to adopt their own constitutions. Governance therefore remains largely based on laws passed by the Kurdistan Parliament, without a higher constitutional framework. One of the foundational laws for governance forms Election Act No. 1, passed on 8 April 1992, which enabled the creation of legislative, executive, and judicial institutions operating on a de facto basis.

Attempts to establish a regional constitution predated the constitutional recognition of the Kurdistan Region. In 2002, the Kurdistan Parliament drafted a regional constitution consisting of 78 articles, but it was not adopted due to political instability in Iraq and external pressure from neighboring countries, particularly over the status of Kirkuk, which was proposed as the capital of the Kurdistan Region. The draft nevertheless remained a reference point in subsequent constitutional discussions. After the constitutional recognition of the region, a new constitutional committee was convened in 2009 on the basis of Article 120 and a second draft constitution, consisting of 122 articles, was prepared. However, persistent political disagreements among the major parties, particularly over whether the system should be semi-presidential or parliamentary, as well as disputes between Erbil and Baghdad and U.S. calls to stand down, prevented it from being submitted to a referendum, and the draft was effectively shelved.

=== Political dynamics ===
Following the establishment of de facto autonomy in 1992, ideas of human rights, democracy, a free market, and individualism gained prominence among the general population. The first elections, held on 19 May 1992 under observation by human rights organizations, were considered among the most democratic in the Middle East at the time, with unprecedented voter participation. Voter turnout has consistently been higher in the KRI than in other parts of Iraq. Between 2003 and the Arab Spring, the KRI increasingly portrayed itself as a pluralist and democratic force in the region.

==== Ruling duopoly ====
The Kurdistan Region became politically divided with two administrations (the 50:50 system) with KDP controlling the Erbil and Duhok Governorates, while PUK took control of Sulaymaniyah Governorate to the east.

The region's politics are dominated by the Kurdistan Democratic Party (KDP) and the Patriotic Union of Kurdistan (PUK), which split in 1975 and have been the two principal governing parties of the Kurdistan Regional Government since the early 1990s, with the PUK generally regarded as the junior partner. The KDP dominates Erbil and Dohuk, while the PUK dominates Sulaymaniyah and Halabja. The parties are shaped by the Barzani and Talabani families, respectively, and continue to share power despite ongoing rivalry. Under their leadership, the Kurdistan Region developed a pro-Western identity. The two ruling parties achieved peak stability and legitimacy in 2010, amid high voter turnout, limited boycotts, and strong electoral results in their favor.

The Carnegie Middle East Center wrote in August 2015:

"The Kurdistan region of Iraq enjoys more stability, economic development, and political pluralism than the rest of the country. And public opinion under the Kurdistan Regional Government demands rule-of-law-based governance. But power is concentrated in the hands of the ruling parties and families, who perpetuate a nondemocratic, sultanistic system. These dynamics could foster instability in Kurdistan and its neighborhood, but could also provide a rare window of opportunity for democratization."

Amid a KDP–PUK power-sharing dispute over the allocation of government positions following the 2024 regional elections, the Kurdistan Region broke the world record for the longest government formation deadlock, reaching 675 calendar days in August 2026. The deadlock underscored the political instability stemming from the region's two-party duopoly.

==== Opposition ====
Despite the dominance of the KDP and PUK, the Kurdistan Region is not considered a two-party system, as several opposition parties have challenged their dominance in the last decade.

The Gorran Movement, led by Nawshirwan Mustafa, briefly emerged as a major opposition force. Founded by former PUK members, it challenged corruption, nepotism, and what it described as "1930s Chicago-style big party politics" of the two dominant parties. Gorran emerged as a significant political force in the 2009 Kurdistan Region general election, securing more than 20% of the vote. Its electoral performance was seen as a significant development and an indication that political change in the region was possible. The party subsequently declined for a number of reasons.

In the late 2010s and 2020s, opposition politics, through the New Generation Movement (NGM) and the National Stance Movement (NSM), continued to shape the political landscape, with both adopting Gorran's slogans, rhetoric, political style, and anti-system populism. However, similar to Gorran, both parties declined due to their failure to unite and present a coherent alternative, reliance on charismatic leadership that proved difficult to replace, internal opportunism, global democratic backsliding, and increasing ability of the KDP and PUK to manage opposition groups through infiltration, pressure, and bribery. Furthermore, the NGM and NSM have been described by some analysts as aligned with Iranian interests and the Iraqi government, including alleged links to senior figures within Baghdad-based Arab paramilitary and political networks, which has been cited as a factor in their more limited public support. In the absence of a strong opposition, voter abstention increased over time among KRI residents, peaking in 2021, as reflected in lower turnout, rising boycotts, and a higher number of invalid votes. This led to the emergence of a "silent majority" of non-voters, with the KDP and PUK combined receiving fewer votes than this group. The trend continued in the 2025 Iraqi parliamentary elections, again reflecting discontent with the existing balance of power. It also highlighted signs of radicalization in socio-economically weaker areas such as Halabja, alongside still limited but reportedly growing support for Islamist groups, including the Kurdistan Islamic Union (KIU) and the Kurdistan Justice Group (Komal), which, similar to the NGM and NSM, have been described by some observers as closely linked to regional powers such as Turkey and Iran.

=== Territory ===
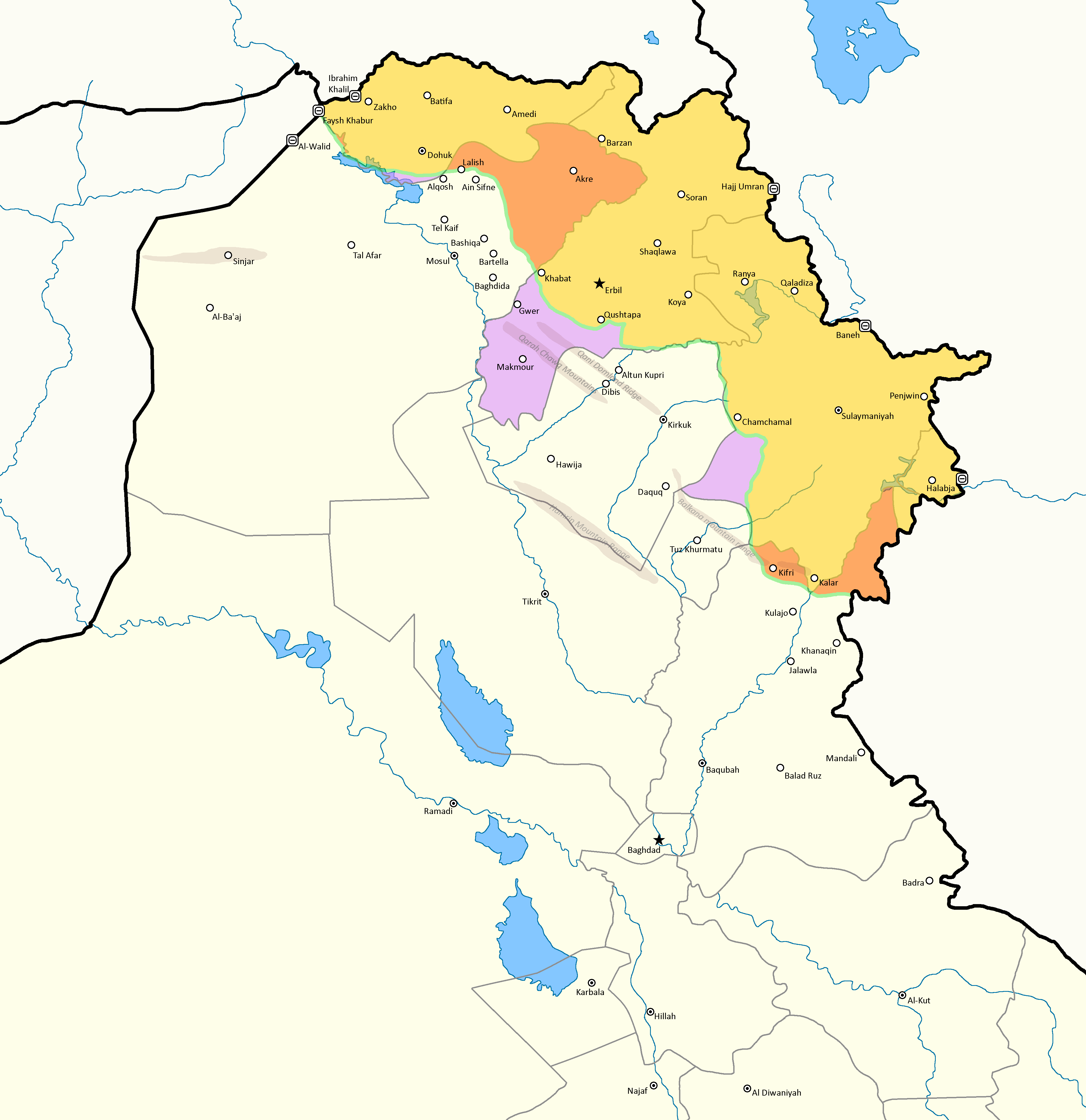
Constitutionally recognized Kurdistan Region east of the Green Line

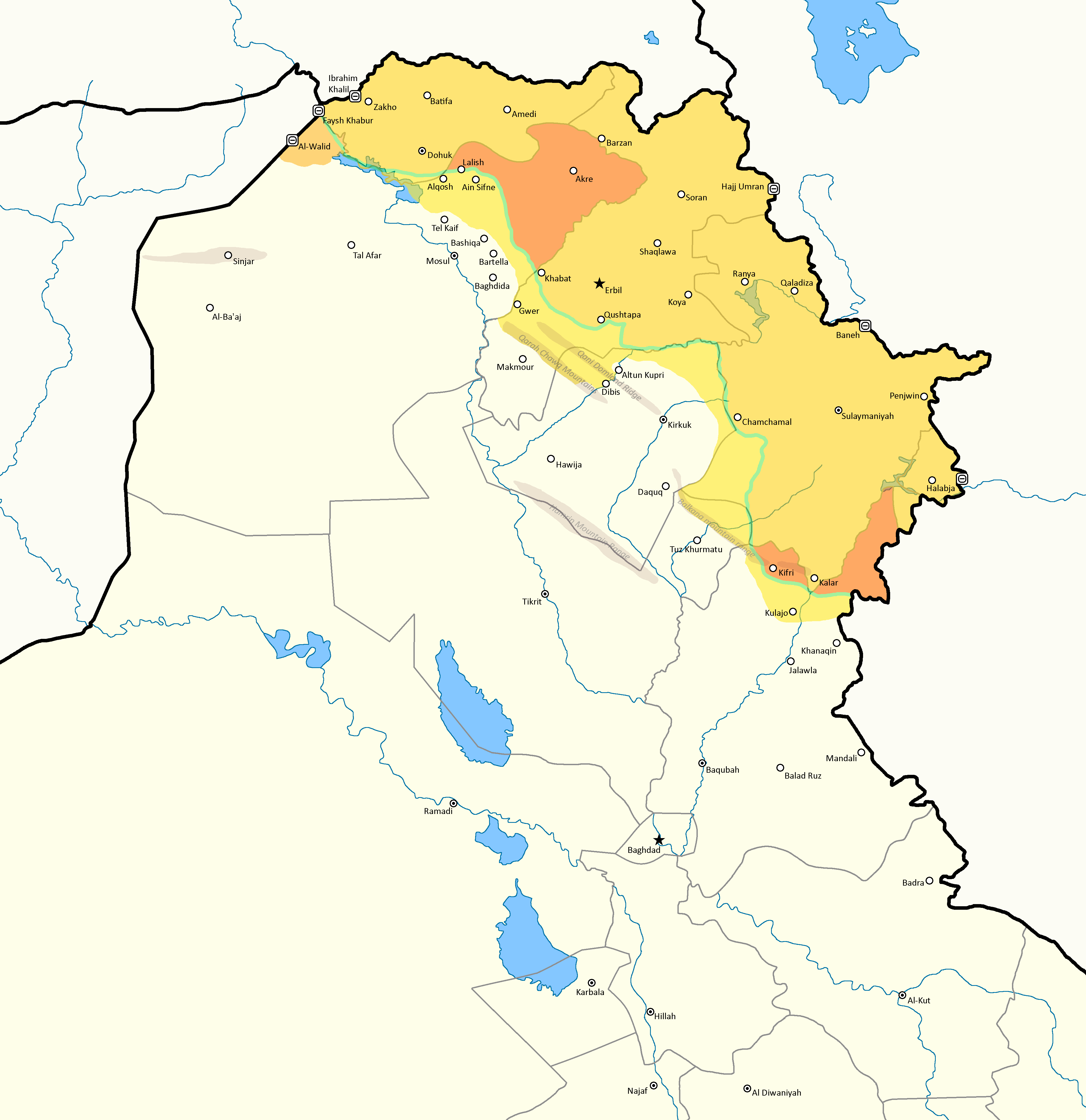
Present extent of the Kurdistan Region

The territory of the Kurdistan Region of Iraq is not precisely defined and has evolved over time, shaped by shifting patterns of de facto and de jure control, constitutional provisions, and political developments. While the region formally comprises the governorates of Erbil, Sulaymaniyah, Duhok, and Halabja, its boundaries are commonly associated with the Green Line as reflected in the Constitution of Iraq, corresponding to areas under Kurdish administration prior to the 2003 invasion of Iraq.

Beyond the Green Line, the Kurdistan Regional Government has at various times exercised control over disputed territories in northern Iraq, particularly during periods of conflict such as after 2003 and between 2014 and 2017. These territories remain contested between federal Iraq and Kurdish authorities, and their final status is subject to constitutional mechanisms such as Article 140 of the Constitution of Iraq.

=== Subdivisons ===
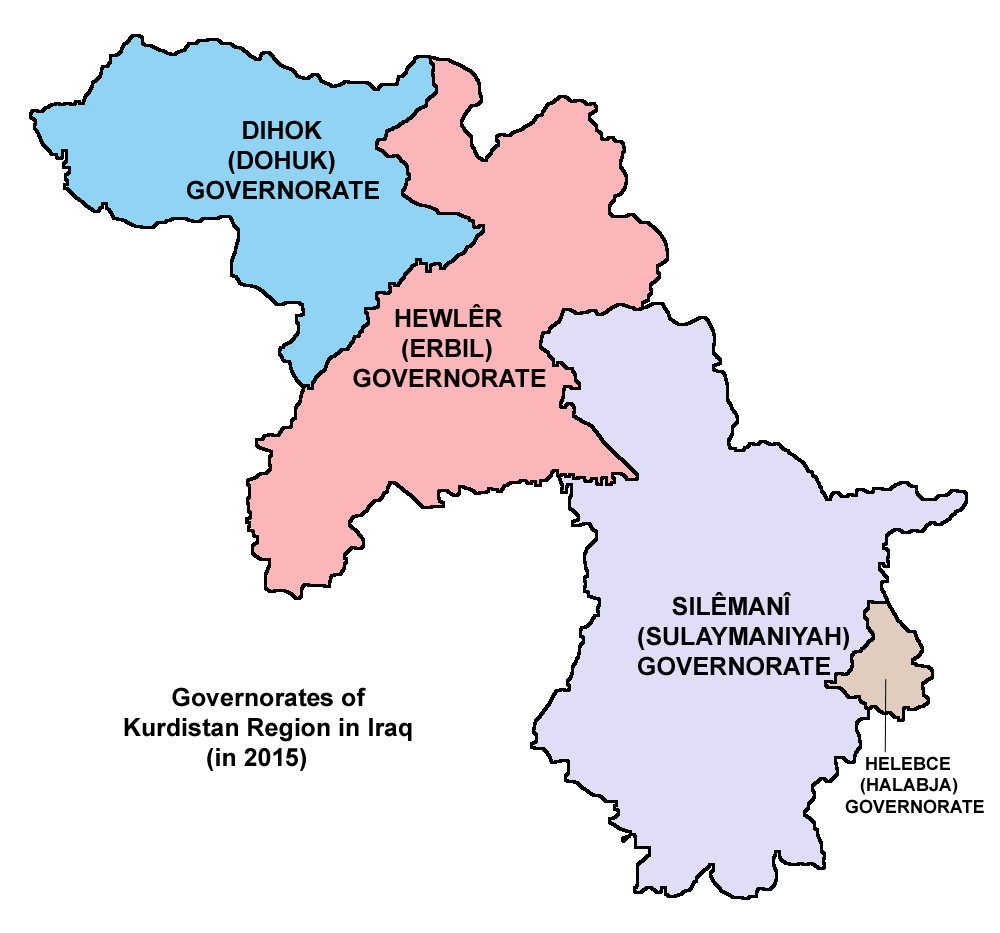
Governorates of Kurdistan Region

The Kurdistan Region is divided into four governorates (Kurdish: پارێزگا, Parêzga): the governorates of Erbil, Sulaymaniyah, Duhok, and Halabja. Each of these governorates is divided into districts, for a total of 26 districts. Each district is also divided into sub-districts. Each governorate has a capital city, while districts and sub-districts have 'district centers'.

Governorate		Population (2020)	Area (km^{2})	Area (mi^{2})
Erbil	هەولێر, Hewlêr	2,932,800	14,873	5,743
Sulaymaniyah	سلێمانی, Silêmanî	2,250,000	20,144	7,778
Duhok	دهۆک, Dihok	1,292,535	10,956	4,230
Halabja	هەڵەبجە, Hellebce	109,000	889	343
Total		6,584,335	46,862	18,094

In 2012, an additional administrative division, the Independent Administration, was established. The first of these was the Raparin Administration, covering the Ranya and Qaladiza areas. This status provides greater decentralization, delegating more power to local authorities to improve public services. The name 'Raparin' (Kurdish: Raperîn, lit.: 'Revolution') was chosen to honor Ranya's central role during the 1991 uprisings. Other Independent Administrations include Soran and Zakho, both established in 2021.

=== Foreign relations ===
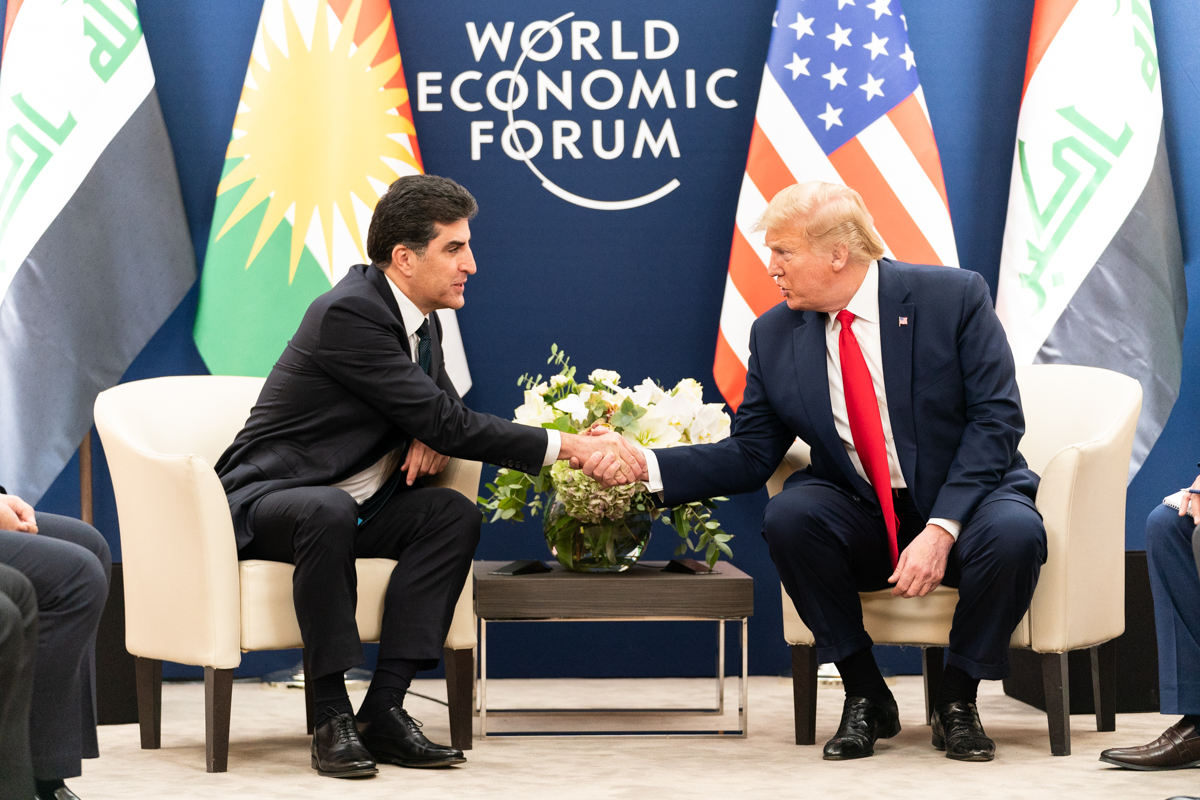
In official and diplomatic ceremonies, the region uses both the Flag of Kurdistan and the Flag of Iraq.

Although the Iraqi constitution designates the federal government as exclusively responsible for formulating foreign policy, until recent years, the Kurdistan Regional Government often practically conducted aspects of these policies independently without coordination with Baghdad. In an interview conducted by Kurdistan 24 in February 2022, KRG senior foreign policy advisor and former head of the foreign policy department, Falah Mustafa Bakir was asked about the extent the Kurdistan Region conducts foreign policy independent of the Iraqi government, to which he answered that "the Kurdistan Region broadly follows the [Iraqi] federal government's foreign policy", indicating a return to the framework outlined in the constitution. In an interview conducted by Al Jazeera on 8 August 2026, the prime minister of KRG, Masrour Barzani stated that foreign policy is the responsibility of the Iraqi government.

The Kurdistan Region pursues a proactive foreign policy that includes strengthening diplomatic relations with Western states such as the United States, the United Kingdom, France, and Germany, as well as with other international powers, including Russia, and regional powers such as Turkey and Iran, and various Arab countries. Twenty nine countries have a diplomatic presence in the Kurdistan Region, while the Kurdistan Region has representative offices in 14 countries.

The KRG has supported Kurdish causes in other parts of Kurdistan, acted as a mediator in the Kurdish–Turkish conflict, and served as a refuge for Iranian Kurdish opposition parties and other politically persecuted Kurdish groups. More recently, it has also played a role in developments involving the SDF and the Syrian transitional government. The KRG's Department of Foreign Relations describes its policy towards Kurdish movements in neighbouring countries as follows:

"The KRG values the struggle of the Kurdish people living in the neighboring countries of the Kurdistan Region. [...] While the Region pursues a policy of non-interference in the internal affairs of neighboring countries, it is willing to work with all Kurdish parties in the neighboring states to pursue peaceful resolutions of their conflicts."

The KRG has generally sought to maintain a neutral stance toward recent regional conflicts in the Middle East, such as the Twelve-Day War and the 2026 Iran war, in order to ensure its own stability and security, and presents itself as a platform for regional dialogue. In this context, it hosts the annual Middle East Peace and Security Forum (MEPS) in Duhok, which is attended by regional and international politicians, diplomats, and academic experts.

=== Military ===
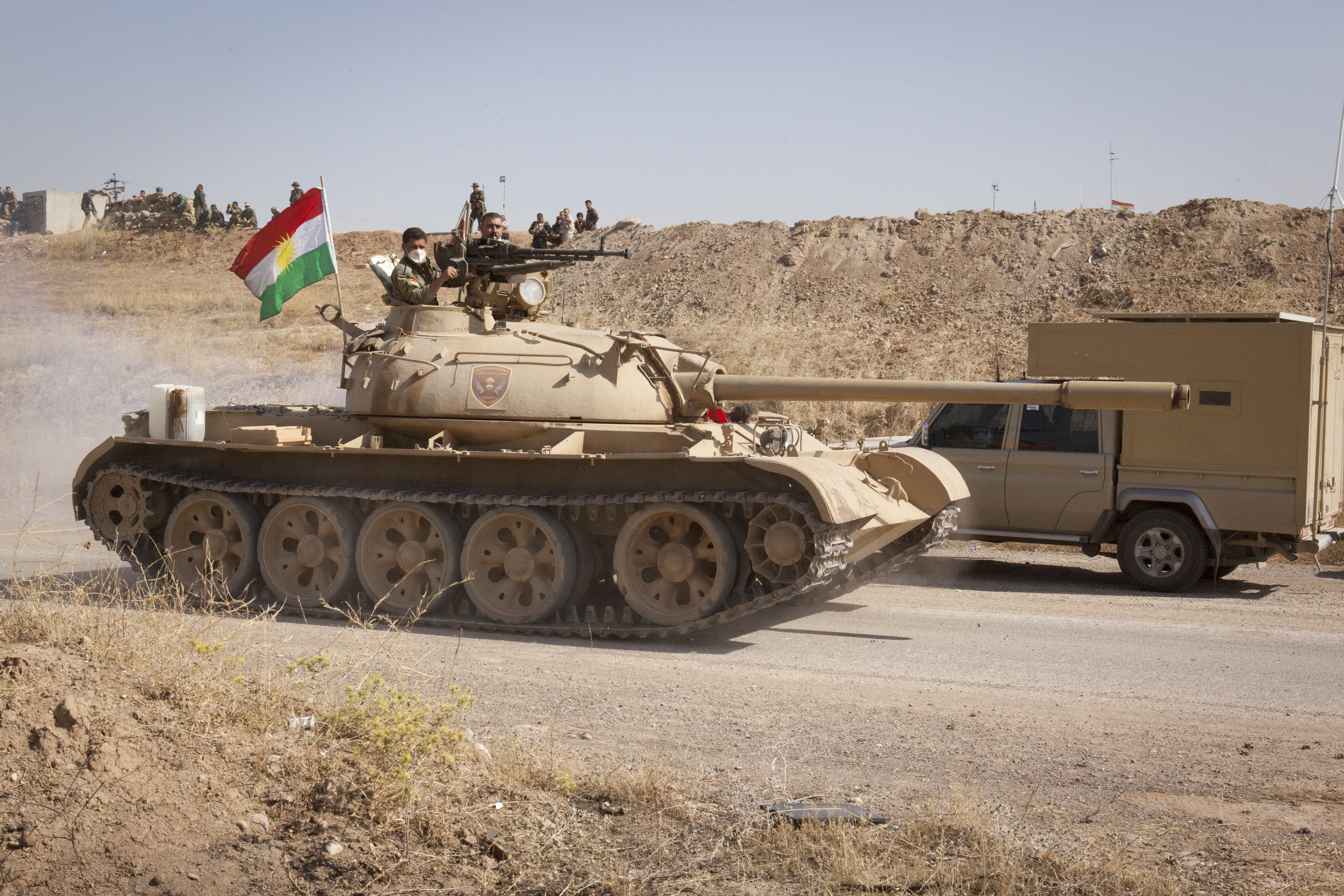
Peshmerga operate a tank in Erbil Governorate during the war against the Islamic State, 2016.

Since 1991, no Iraqi army personnel have been stationed in the Kurdistan Region, leaving security and stability to Kurdish forces and contributing to its relative stability compared to other parts of Iraq. Article 117 of the 2005 Iraqi Constitution allows federal regions to establish their own internal security forces, including "police, security forces, and guards of the region." The Peshmerga operate entirely independently of the Iraqi government.

The Peshmerga, under the Ministry of Peshmerga Affairs (MoPA), are the main military forces of the KRI. In addition, the Kurdistan Region maintains a range of security institutions, including the Kurdistan Region Police, domestic security and intelligence (Asayish and the Kurdistan Region Security Council), foreign intelligence (Parastin u Zanyari), gendarmerie forces (Zeravani and the Defense and Emergency Forces), and counter-terrorism and special forces such as the Counter Terrorism Department, the CTG Kurdistan, and the Kurdistan Commando Forces.

=== Human rights ===
In 2010 Human Rights Watch reported that journalists in the Kurdistan Region who criticize the regional government have faced substantial violence, threats, and lawsuits, and some have fled the country. Some journalists faced trial and threats of imprisonment for their reports about corruption in the region.

In 2009 Human Rights Watch found that some health providers in Iraqi Kurdistan had been involved in both performing and promoting misinformation about the practice of female genital mutilation. Girls and women receive conflicting and inaccurate messages from media campaigns and medical personnel on its consequences. The Kurdistan parliament in 2008 passed a draft law outlawing the practice, but the ministerial decree necessary to implement it, expected in February 2009, was cancelled. As reported to the Centre for Islamic Pluralism by the non-governmental organization, called as Stop FGM in Kurdistan, the Kurdistan Regional Government in northern Iraq, on 25 November, officially admitted the wide prevalence in the territory of female genital mutilation (FGM). Recognition by the KRG of the frequency of this custom among Kurds came during a conference program commemorating the International Day for the Elimination of Violence Against Women. On 27 November 2010, the Kurdish government officially admitted to violence against women in Kurdistan and began taking serious measures. 21 June 2011 The Family Violence Bill was approved by the Kurdistan Parliament, it includes several provisions criminalizing the practice. A 2011 Kurdish law criminalized FGM practice in Iraqi Kurdistan and law was accepted four years later. The studies have shown that there is a trend of general decline of FGM.

British lawmaker Robert Halfon sees the Kurdistan Region as a more progressive Muslim region than the other Muslim countries in the Middle East.

Although the Kurdish regional parliament has officially recognized ethnic minorities such as Assyrians, Turkmen, Arabs, Armenians, Mandaeans, Shabaks and Yazidis, there have been accusations of Kurdish discrimination against those groups. The Assyrians have reported Kurdish officials' reluctance in rebuilding Assyrian villages in their region while constructing more settlements for the Kurds affected during the Anfal campaign. After his visit to the region, Dutch politician Joël Voordewind noted that the positions reserved for minorities in the Kurdish parliament were appointed by Kurds as the Assyrians for example had no possibility to nominate their own candidates.

The Kurdish regional government has also been accused of trying to Kurdify other regions such as the Nineveh Plains and Kirkuk by providing financial support for Kurds who want to settle in those areas.

While Kurdish forces held the city of Kirkuk, Kurdish authorities attempted to Kurdify the city. Turkmen and Arab residents in Kirkuk experienced intimidation, harassment and were forced to leave their homes, in order to increase the Kurdish demographic in Kirkuk and bolster their claims to the city. Multiple Human Rights Watch reports detail the confiscation of Turkmen and Arab families' documents, preventing them from voting, buying property and travelling. Turkmen residents of Kirkuk were detained by Kurdish forces and compelled to leave the city. Kurdish authorities expelled hundreds of Arab families from the city, demolishing their homes in the process.

United Nations reports since 2006 have documented that Kurdish authorities and Peshmerga militia forces were illegally policing Kirkuk and other disputed areas, and that these militia have abducted Turkmen and Arabs, subjecting them to torture.

In April 2016, Human Rights Watch wrote that the Kurdish security force of KRG, the Asayish, blocked the roads to Erbil to prevent Assyrians from holding a protest. According to demonstrators, the reason for the blocked protest was that Kurds in the Nahla Valley, mainly populated by Assyrians, encroached on land owned by Assyrians, without any action by courts or officials to remove the structures the Kurds built there.

In February 2017, Human Rights Watch said Kurdistan Regional Government (KRG) forces are detaining men and boys who have fled the fighting in Mosul even after they have passed security checks. Detainees were held for up to four months without any communication with their families. Relatives of these men and boys said that KRG and Iraqi forces didn't inform them of the places of their detained relatives and didn't facilitate any contact with them.

Human Rights Watch reported that Kurdistan Regional Government security forces and local police detained 32 unarmed protesters in Erbil on March 4, 2017, at a peaceful demonstration against recent clashes in Sinjar. 23 of them were released at the same day and 3 more within four days, but 6, all foreign nationals, are still being held. A police chief ordered one protester who was released to permanently leave Erbil, where he was living. While in detention, protesters were not allowed to contact with anyone or have access to a lawyer.

In 2017, Assyrian activists Juliana Taimoorazy and Matthew Joseph accused the Kurdistan Regional Government of issuing threats of violence against Assyrians living in the area who protested its independence referendum. These accusations were later confirmed when the KDP-controlled provincial council of Alqosh issued a statement warning residents that they would face consequences for protesting the referendum.

In 2010, it was reported that passing of a new law in Iraqi Kurdistan, guaranteeing "gender equality", has deeply outraged some local religious community, including the minister of endowments and religious affairs and prominent imams, who interpreted the phrase as "legitimizing homosexuality in Kurdistan". Kamil Haji Ali, the minister of endowments and religious affairs, said in this regard that the new law would "spread immorality" and "distort" Kurdish society. Following an outrage of religious movements, the KRG held a press conference, where the public were assured that gender equality did not include giving marriage rights to homosexuals, whose existence is effectively invisible in Iraq due to restrictive traditional rules.

In the disputed areas of Sinjar and the Nineveh Plains, the Kurdistan Regional Government has been accused by the native Assyrian and Yazidi inhabitants of forcefully disarming them with the guarantee of protection in order to justify the Peshmerga's presence in those regions. In 2014, when the Islamic State invaded Northern Iraq, the Peshmerga abandoned their posts in these areas without notifying the locals, after which the Sinjar massacre happened.

== Economy ==
Economy by sector (GDP, 2013)
1. Oil (80.0%)
2. Agriculture (10.0%)
3. Tourism (4.00%)
4. Other (6.00%)

The economy of the Kurdistan Region is dominated by the oil industry and a large public sector, leading it to be described as a rentier state or petrostate similar to those in the Gulf countries. Strong economic growth occurred in the Kurdistan Region following the 2003 invasion of Iraq. Between 2003 and 2006, for example, the number of millionaires in Sulaymaniyah grew from 12 to 2,000, while the region's per capita income exceeded that of the rest of Iraq by 50% in 2004 and by 200% in 2009. Annual economic growth consistently exceeded 10% between 2005 and 2012, while economic opportunities attracted around 20,000 workers from other parts of Iraq between 2003 and 2005. Since the late 2010s, the Kurdish government has sought to diversify the economy in order to mitigate risks arising from sole dependence on oil and reduce vulnerability to economic crises. Visit Kurdistan is an organisation, which promotes tourism to the region.

According to a report published in 2009, compared to the rest of Iraq, the Kurdistan Region has the lowest poverty rates and a relatively good economy. However, unemployment in the Kurdistan Region is still high, particularly among young people. Between 2021 and 2022, the International Labour Organization reported consistently high rates of 14–18%, worsened by the COVID-19 pandemic, and official statistics indicate that the rate surged to over 24% in 2024, amid conflict with the Iraqi government over salary payments. According to estimates, debt of the KRG reached $18 billion in January 2016.

=== Petroleum and mineral resources ===
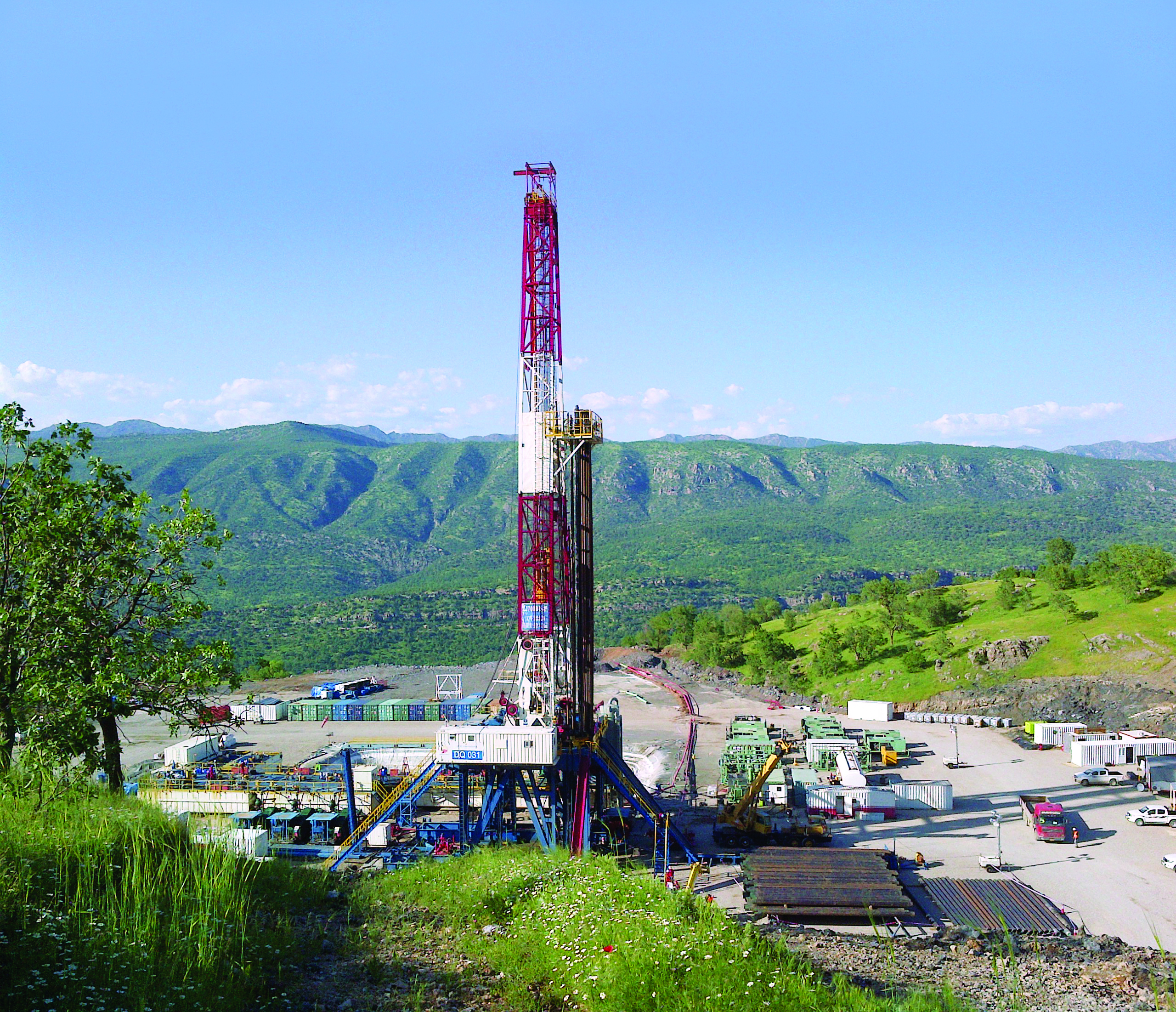
The Atrush Field near Duhok, 2013.

The Kurdistan Region contains approximately 4 billion barrels of proven oil reserves. Furthermore, the KRG has estimated that the region contains around 45 billion barrels (7.2×10^{9} m^{3}) of unproven oil resource.

Extraction of these reserves began in 2007, as the KRG invited foreign companies to invest in 40 new oil sites, with the hope of increasing regional oil production over the following 5 years by a factor of five, to about 1 million barrels per day (160,000 m^{3}/d). Notable companies active in the Kurdistan Region include Exxon, TotalEnergies, Chevron, Talisman Energy, DNO, MOL Group, Genel Energy, Hunt Oil, Gulf Keystone Petroleum, and Marathon Oil.

In November 2011, Exxon challenged the Iraqi government's authority with the signing of oil and gas contracts for exploration rights to six parcels of land with the KRG, including one contract in the disputed territories, just east of the Kirkuk mega-field. This act prompted Baghdad to threaten revoking Exxon's contract in its southern Iraqi fields, most notably the West Qurna project. Exxon responded by announcing its intention to leave the West-Qurna project.

In July 2012, Turkey and the Kurdistan Regional Government signed an agreement by which Turkey would supply the KRG with refined petroleum products in exchange for crude oil.

In 2015, major oil export partners included Israel, Italy, France and Greece.

Other mineral resources that exist in significant quantities in the region include coal, copper, gold, iron, limestone (which is used to produce cement), marble, and zinc. The world's largest deposit of rock sulfur is located just southwest of Erbil.

=== Cessation of oil exports ===
In March 2023 the International Chamber of Commerce ruled that the oil export agreement between KRI and Turkey was illegal. According to the verdict, only the Iraqi central government can sign international trade agreements regarding oil exports, and Turkey was found guilty of violating the Iraq–Turkey Pipeline Agreement of 1973, causing the pumping of petroleum products through the Kirkuk–Ceyhan Oil Pipeline between the Kurdistan Region and Turkey to cease. The closure of the pipeline left much of the Kurdistan Region's petroleum output with no legal outlet, causing a rise in illegal smuggling of oil to Iran via tanker trucks.

=== Resumption of oil exports by SOMO ===
On 25 September 2025, the Iraqi federal government announced that it had reached a multilateral deal with the Kurdistan Regional Government and international oil companies (IOCs) operating in the KRI wherein precise technical guidelines and conditions of payment for crude oil production and transportation are set out. The deal is in line with the 2023-2025 Federal Budget Law approved by the Iraqi Council of Representatives.

Under the deal, the Federal Government will receive at least 230 000 barrels per day of oil produced in KRI and delivered directly to the Iraqi State Organization for Marketing of Oil (SOMO), which will in turn independently conduct the sale of these barrels through the Kirkuk–Ceyhan pipeline. Conditional on SOMO receiving at least 230 000 barrels daily, the Federal Ministry of Finance will in turn pay the KRG its annual share of the federal budget according to the Federal Budget Law. The IOCs on the other hand, will be reimbursed for production and transportation costs of the amount received by SOMO (USD 14$ per barrel) paid through an escrow account directly.

The deal stipulates that KRG and IOCs will be completely excluded from the export process, and won't directly receive revenues from exports of oil barrels produced in KRI. Instead, the Iraqi government will allocate the revenues gained from independently exporting at least 230 000 barrels per day produced in the KRI to the central government budget, from which the KRG will receive its share proportional to its population, a mechanism identical to that used with other Iraqi oil-producing governorates, such as Basrah. Of the amount produced by the international oil companies —that is, at least 280 000 barrels per day— an amount no more than 50 000 barrels will be allocated for KRI domestic consumption. The IOCs will be allowed to sell this amount to domestic buyers and receive the revenues of this amount only.

The Iraqi Ministry of Oil reiterated its "firm commitment to managing oil resources in accordance with the principle of national sovereignty and the supreme interest of the state, in order to ensure a fair distribution of wealth among all the Iraqi people, in accordance with the constitution". The Iraqi minister of oil, Hayan Abdul-Ghani stated that the deal guarantees that the Iraqi government controls all revenues of the country.

The Iraqi North Oil Company, North Gas Company and SOMO have since been responsible for overseeing the "exploration, production, and management of oil and gas resources in the Kurdistan Region and its surrounding areas".

=== Infrastructure ===
Animation of Motorway 150, inaugurated in 2021 as an additional ring road around Erbil.

Due to the destruction caused by campaigns of the Iraqi army under Saddam Hussein and earlier regimes, much of the region's infrastructure remained underdeveloped. Following the establishment of the safe haven in 1991, the KRG initiated reconstruction projects. By the 2000s, approximately 65 percent of the estimated 4,500 villages destroyed during earlier conflicts had been rebuilt. Today, infrastructure and public services, including schools and healthcare facilities, are generally considered relatively well developed by regional standards and have been described by scholars as among the KRG's principal achievements.

=== Transportation ===
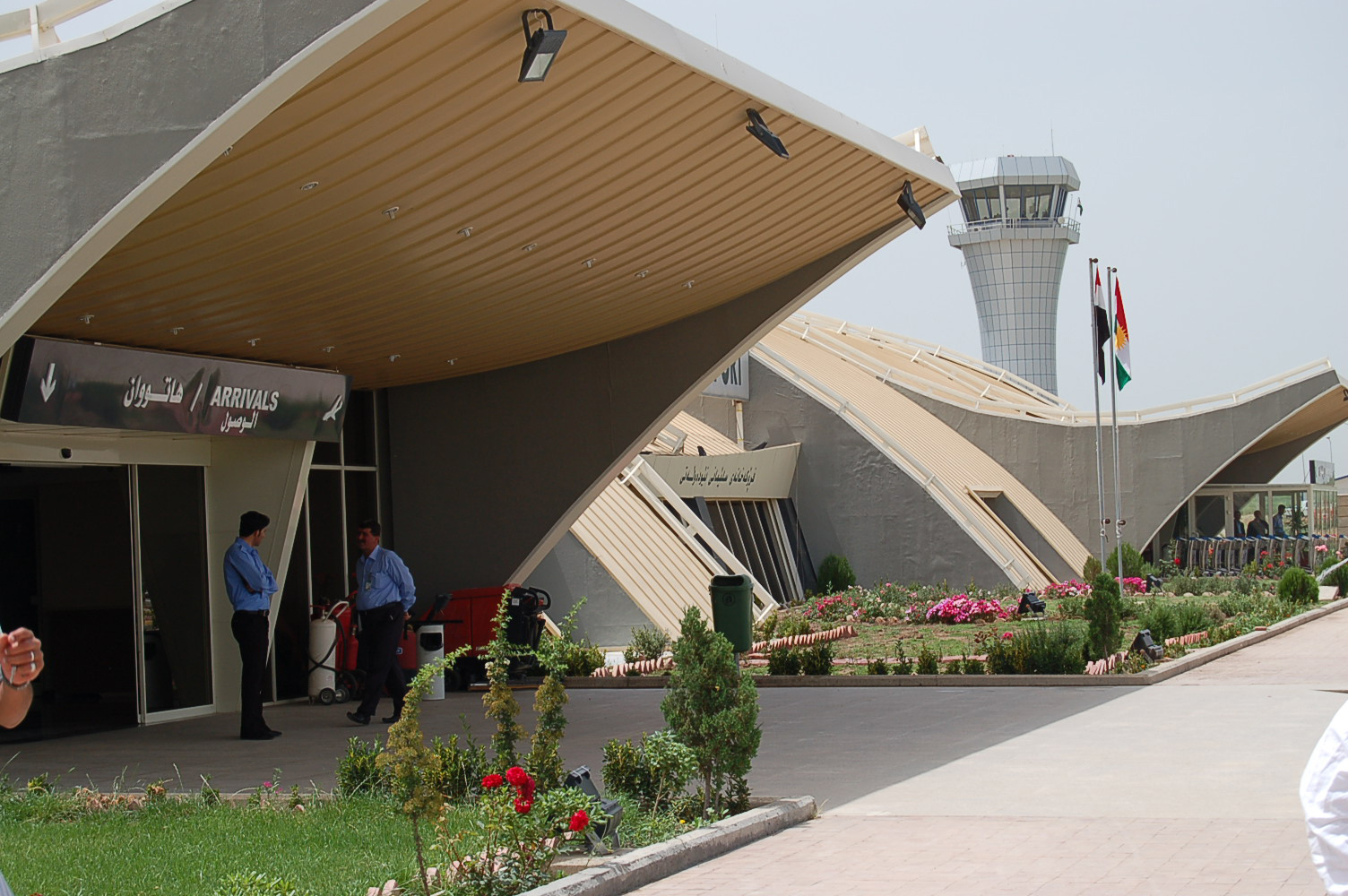
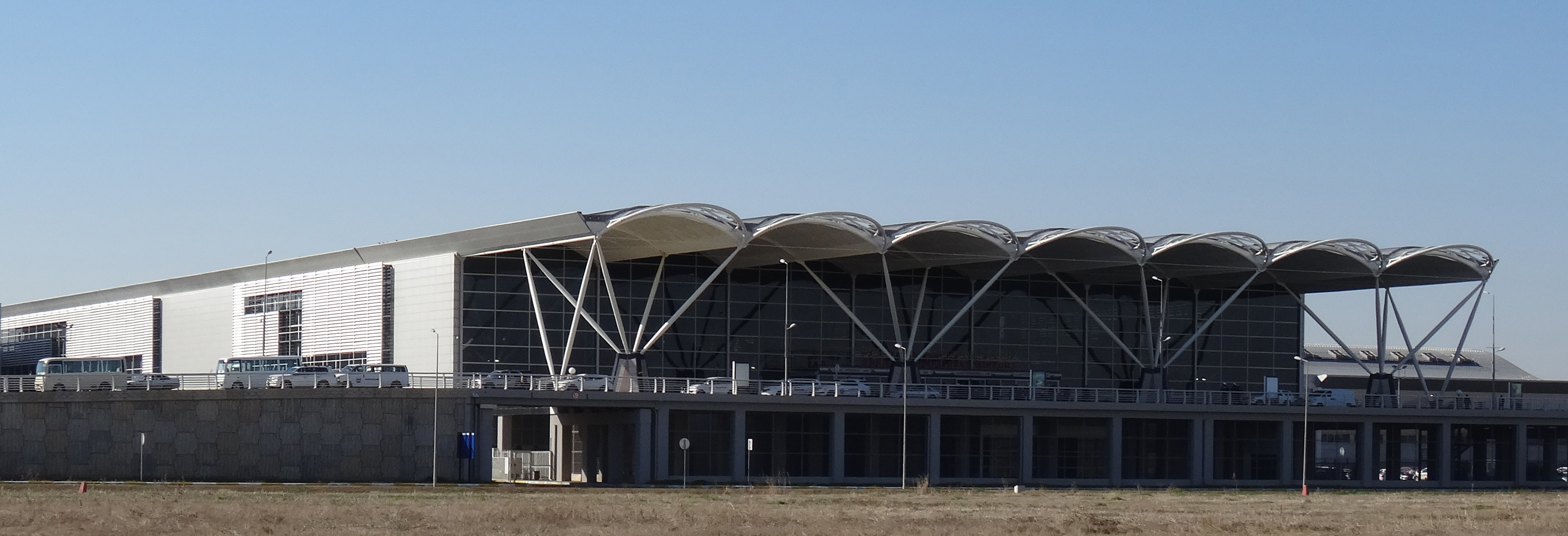
Airports of Sulaimaniyah and Erbil

Iraqi Kurdistan can be reached by land and air. By land, Iraqi Kurdistan can be reached most easily by Turkey through the Habur Border Gate which is the only border gate between Iraqi Kurdistan and Turkey. This border gate can be reached by bus or taxi from airports in Turkey as close as the Mardin or Diyarbakir airports, as well as from Istanbul or Ankara. Iraqi Kurdistan has two border gates with Iran, the Haji Omaran border gate and the Bashmeg border gate near the city of Sulaymaniyah. Iraqi Kurdistan has also a border gate with Syria known as the Faysh Khabur border gate. From within Iraq, the Kurdistan Region can be reached by land from multiple roads.

Two international airports are located in the region; Erbil International Airport and Sulaimaniyah International Airport, which both operate flights to Middle Eastern and European destinations. The KRG spent millions of dollars on the airports to attract international carriers, and currently Turkish Airlines, Austrian Airlines, Lufthansa, Etihad, Royal Jordanian, Emirates, Gulf Air, Pegasus Airlines, Egyptair, Middle East Airlines, Fly Baghdad, Atlas Jet, Iraqi Airways, Wizz Air, Flynas and Flydubai all service the region. There are at least 2 military airfields in Iraqi Kurdistan.

=== Human resources ===
Iraqi Kurdistan has been investing in the growth of its human capital in general. Public sector employees are often enrolled in local training programmes or sent overseas to participate in training courses, technical classes, and professional development programmes. However, factors such as the lack of a practical and formal HRD framework specific to the KRG's public sector, the absence of evaluation process, inadequate civil service training institutions, and corruption have hampered effective and efficient professional development and training in the public sector. Therefore, an assessment of such programmes and their outcomes is needed to identify any misuse of public funds, as well as to assist in the reducing of administrative and political corruption and to make policy recommendations. The government's policies for the public sector have also had an impact on the private sector. However, the government has played a much smaller role in the private sector. In Iraqi Kurdistan, the Ministry of Planning has primarily concentrated on activating training in the public sector, with the goal of expanding opportunities and improving the efficiency of the training process. In the long run, this will have an effect on private sector training and growth.

== Demographics ==
Due to the lack of a proper census, the exact population and demographics of Kurdistan Region are unknown, but the KRG has started to publish more detailed figures in recent years. The population of the region is notoriously difficult to ascertain, as the Iraqi government has historically sought to minimize the importance of the Kurdish minority while Kurdish groups have had a tendency to exaggerate the numbers.

=== Population ===
According to preliminary 2024 census data, the Kurdistan Region has a population of 6,370,668, representing 14.02% of Iraq's total population (over 45.4 million). About 84% of residents live in urban areas and 16% in rural areas. The average household size is 4.3 persons across 1.38 million families. The population is nearly evenly split by gender and is relatively young, with 31.9% under 15 and 63.07% of working age. The region has experienced a population growth rate of 2.48% since 2009.

Largest districts in the Kurdistan Region 2024 census of the Central Organization for Statistics
Rank	Name	Governorate	Pop.	Rank	Name	Governorate	Pop.
1	Erbil (Note: includes the adjacent district of Bnaslawa)	Erbil	1,603,804 (Note: includes the population of Erbil city (1,288,538) and the adjacent district of Bnaslawa (315,266))	11	Pshdar	Sulaymaniyah	140,688
2	Sulaymaniyah	Sulaymaniyah	1,056,067	12	Bardarash	Duhok	129,715
3	Duhok	Duhok	497,029	13	Halabja	Halabja	113,926
4	Zakho	Duhok	398,876	14	Koya	Erbil	110,172
5	Akre	Duhok	260,907	15	Chamchamal	Sulaymaniyah	109,502
6	Kalar	Sulaymaniyah	213,452	16	Amedi	Duhok	103,507
7	Ranya	Sulaymaniyah	197,700	17	Pirmam	Erbil	96,713
8	Soran	Erbil	179,596	18	Said Sadiq	Sulaymaniyah	93,247
9	Simele	Duhok	166,319	19	Dokan	Sulaymaniyah	75,167
10	Khabat	Erbil	148,047	20	Sharbazher	Sulaymaniyah	73,776

=== Immigration ===
Widespread economic activity between the Kurdistan Region and Turkey has given the opportunity for Kurds in Turkey to seek jobs in the Kurdistan Region. A Kurdish newspaper estimated that around 50,000 Kurds from Turkey were living in the Kurdistan Region in 2009. In December 2017, the Kurdistan Region hosted 1.2 million internally displaced (IDP) Iraqis who had been displaced by the war against the Islamic State. There were about 335,000 IDPs and refugees in the region prior to 2014 with the some arriving in 2014 as a result of unrest in Syria and early insurgency by the Islamic State.

Kurdistan Region population by residence type (2016)
	Erbil		Duhok		Sulaymaniya		Total	
	Population	%	Population	%	Population	%	Population	%
Native	2,060,000	86.0%	1,470,000	67.2%	2,080,000	88.9%	5,610,002	81.0%
IDPs	257,424	10.7%	625,000	28.6%	229,000	9.8%	1,111,424	16.1%
Refugees	77,637	3.2%	93,000	4.3%	31,000	1.3%	201,637	2.9%
Total	2,395,061	100.0%	2,188,000	100.0%	2,340,000	100.0%	6,923,063	100.0%

=== Languages ===
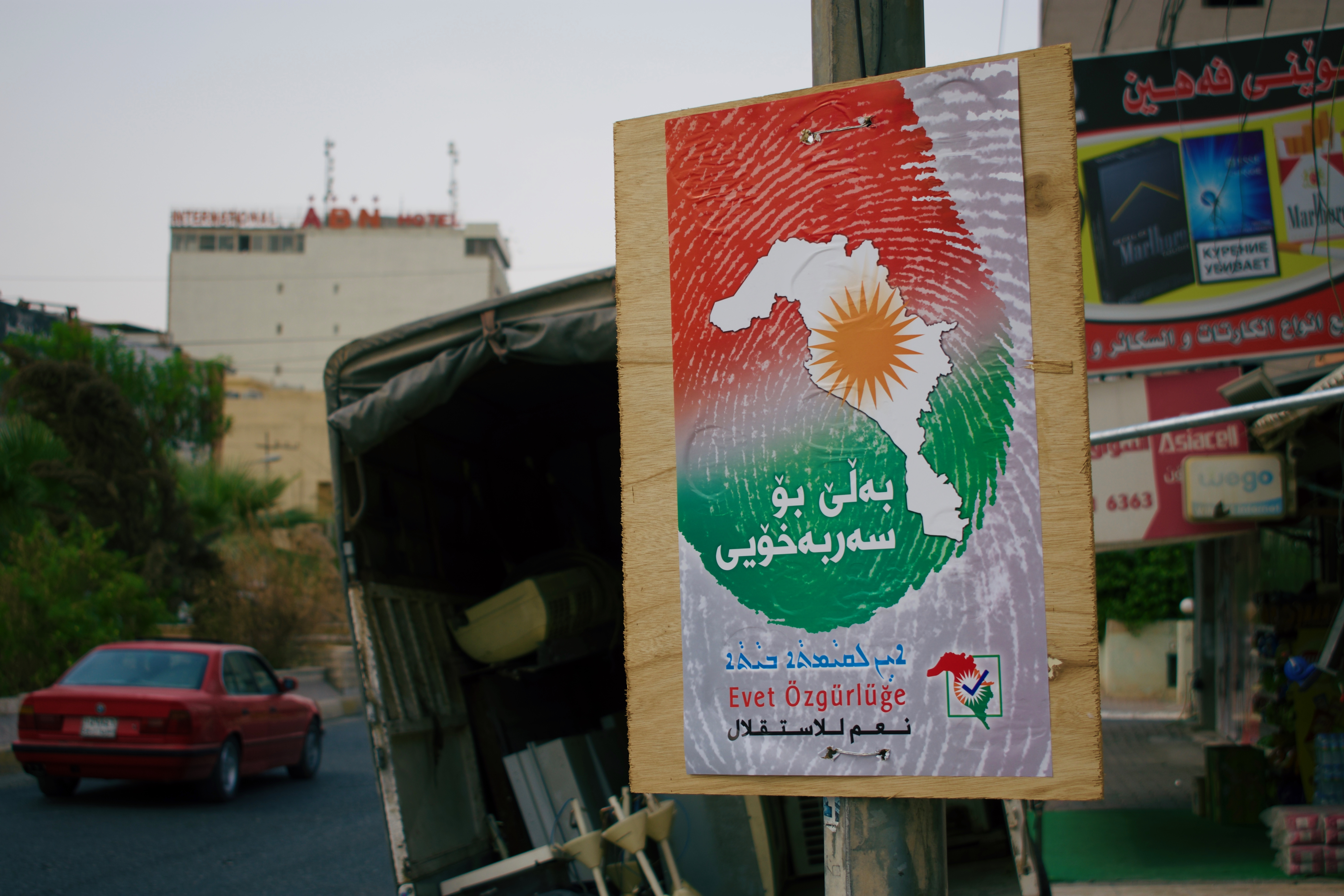
Pro-independence referendum poster in Erbil, featuring the multilingual slogan "Yes for Independence" in Kurdish, Aramaic, Turkmen, and Arabic.

The Kurdistan Region is a multilingual area with a variety of languages and dialects spoken. The majority of the population speaks Kurdish in its various dialects, which, alongside Arabic, is an official language of the region. The two main Kurdish dialects in the region are Central Kurdish (Sorani), spoken in Erbil and Sulaymaniyah, and Northern Kurdish (Kurmanji), spoken mostly in Dohuk. Today nearly all people in the Kurdistan Region can speak or understand both of the major dialects.

Other languages and Kurdish dialects spoken by their respective communities include Hawrami and Southern Kurdish, as well as Arabic, Neo-Aramaic (including Chaldean and Assyrian), Armenian, and Turkmen. The KRG promotes linguistic diversity, and some schools have been established using these minority languages as the primary medium of instruction. Turkmen, Syriac, and Armenian are recognized languages in their respective administrative areas alongside Kurdish, according to the 2014 Law of Official Languages passed by the Kurdistan Parliament.

=== Religion ===
The dominant religion is Islam, which is practiced by Kurds, Iraqi Turkmen, and Arabs, most of whom belong to the Shafi'i school of Sunni Islam. There is also a small number of Shia Feyli Kurds. The population is nevertheless relatively religiously diverse compared to neighbouring states and the rest of Iraq, while political Islam plays a relatively minor role in the region. This has been attributed in part to the Kurdistan Region's relatively secular governance and tradition of religious pluralism. Religious diversity increased further during the rise of the Islamic State, when members of various minority groups fled to the region. Secularization trends among the KRI's native population were also reinforced during this period. Subsequently, the KRI has frequently been described as a "safe haven" for religious minorities, where Muslims and non-Muslims alike can practice their religions openly.

Christianity is practiced by Assyrians, Chaldeans, Kurds, and Armenians. The Kurdistan Regional Government seeks to promote the inclusion of Christian communities; for example, it enacted a law in 2015 to formally protect religious minorities, provides funding for the construction of churches and educational institutions, and in 2021 granted expanded autonomy to Ankawa, a predominantly Christian suburb of Erbil.

Yazidis make up a significant minority, with some 650,000 in 2005, or 560,000 as of 2013. The oldest and holiest temple complex of the Yazidis, at Lalish, lies in the Kurdistan Region. The Yarsan (Ahl-e Haqq or Kakai) religion numbers around 200,000 adherents respectively.

In 2020, it was reported that 60 Zoroastrian families live in the Kurdistan Region, while other sources estimate 15,000–30,000 members. Their numbers may have grown as some Kurds see Zoroastrianism as their "original" religion, influenced by Kurdish nationalism, and have turned away from Islam following atrocities committed by the Islamic State. The first modern Zoroastrian temple was opened in the city of Sulaymaniyah in September 2016, while another was opened in 2020 in Erbil.

A tiny ethno-religious community of Mandaeans also exists within the region. The National Association of Jews from Kurdistan in Israel has stated that a small number of expatriate Jews reside in the Kurdistan Region, but that no members of the original Jewish communities remain, while the Stroum Center for Jewish Studies estimates that around 500 Jewish families are still present. Members of the Baháʼí Faith are recognized by the KRG's Ministry of Endowment and Religious Affairs, which has supported their right to gather, worship, and participate in society, while in contrast they are illegal in the rest of Iraq and face systematic state persecution in neigbouring Iran.

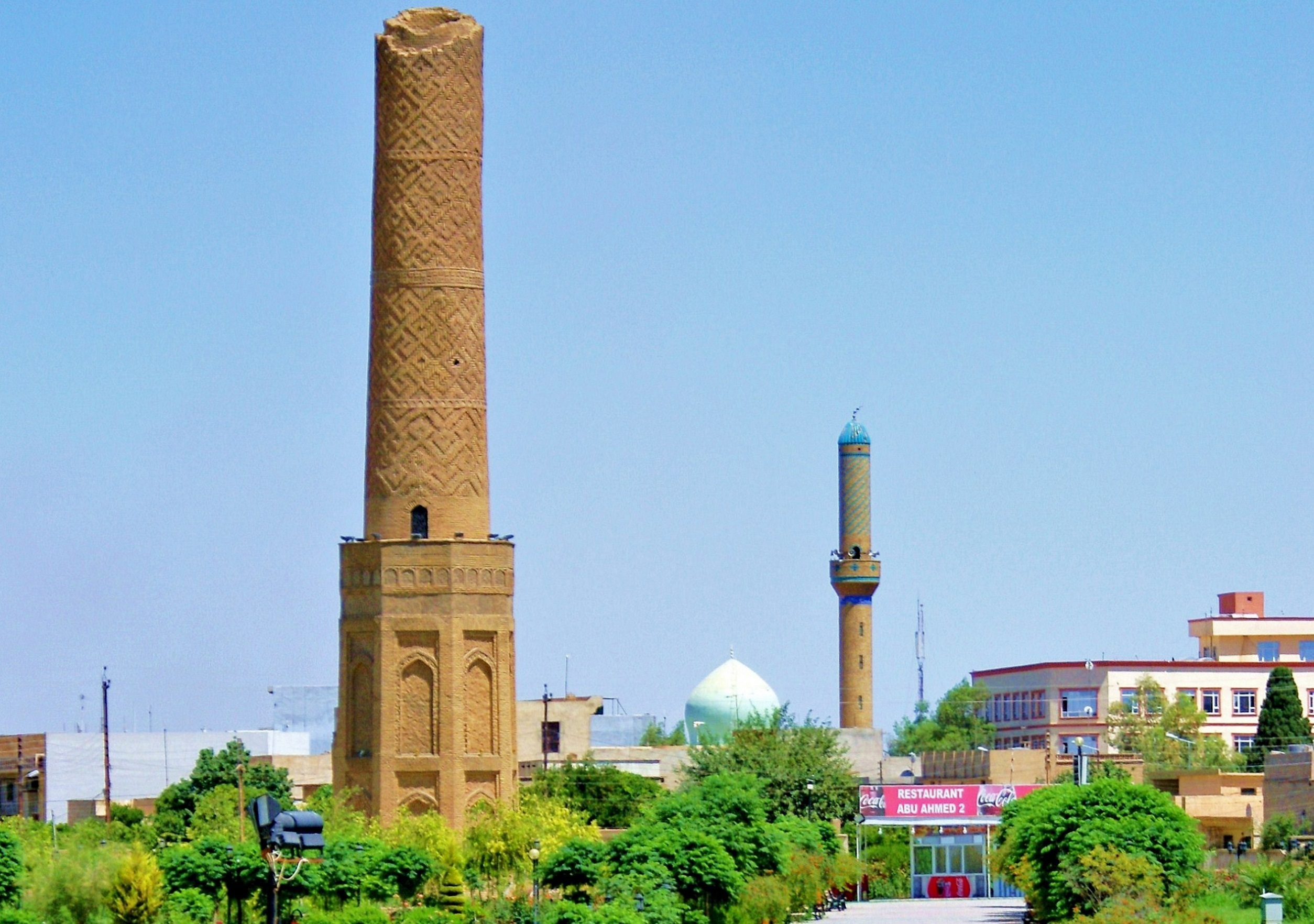
Mudhafaria Minaret in the Minare Park, Erbil

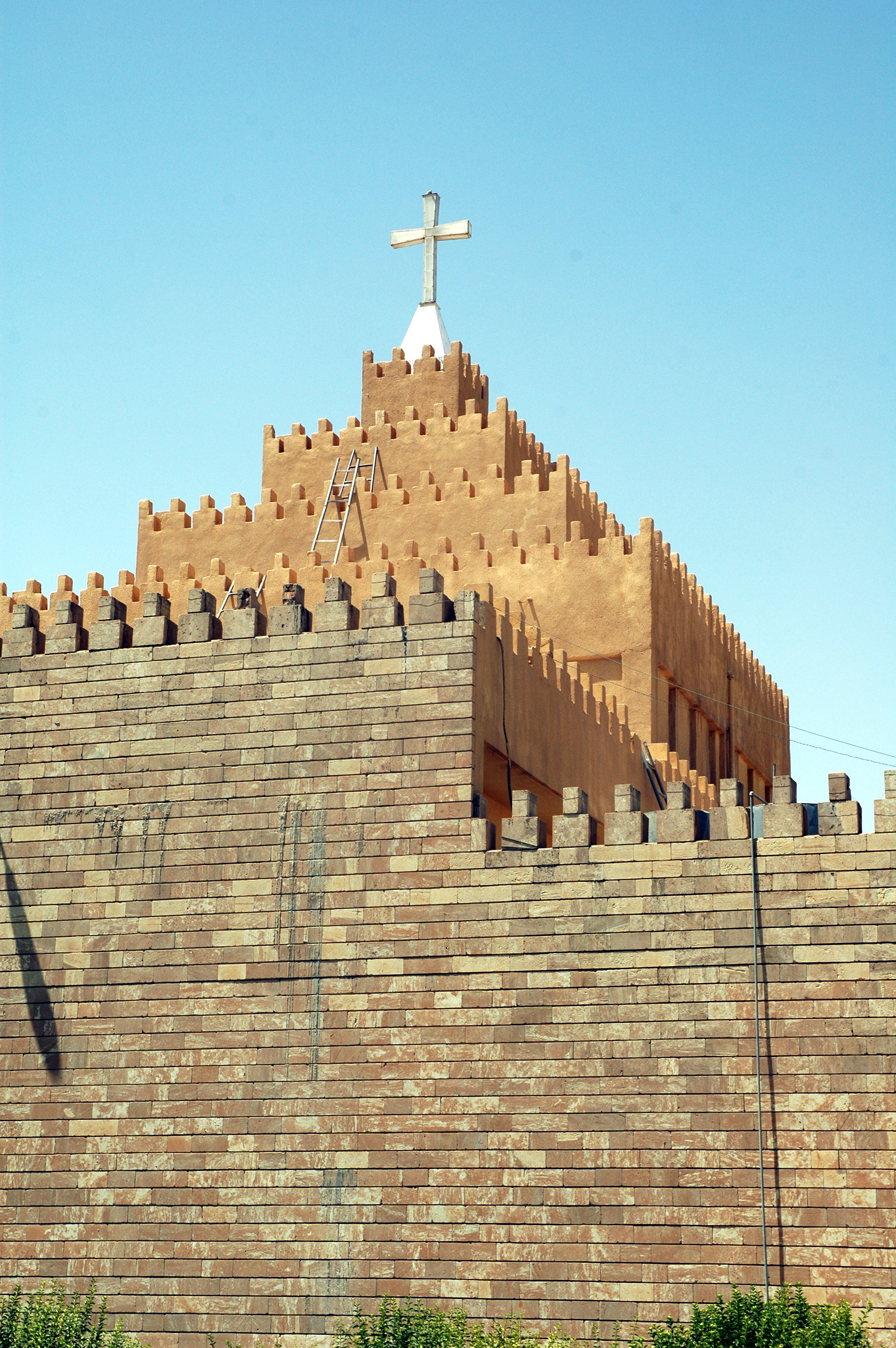
Chaldean Catholic Mar Yousif Cathedral in Ankawa, Erbil

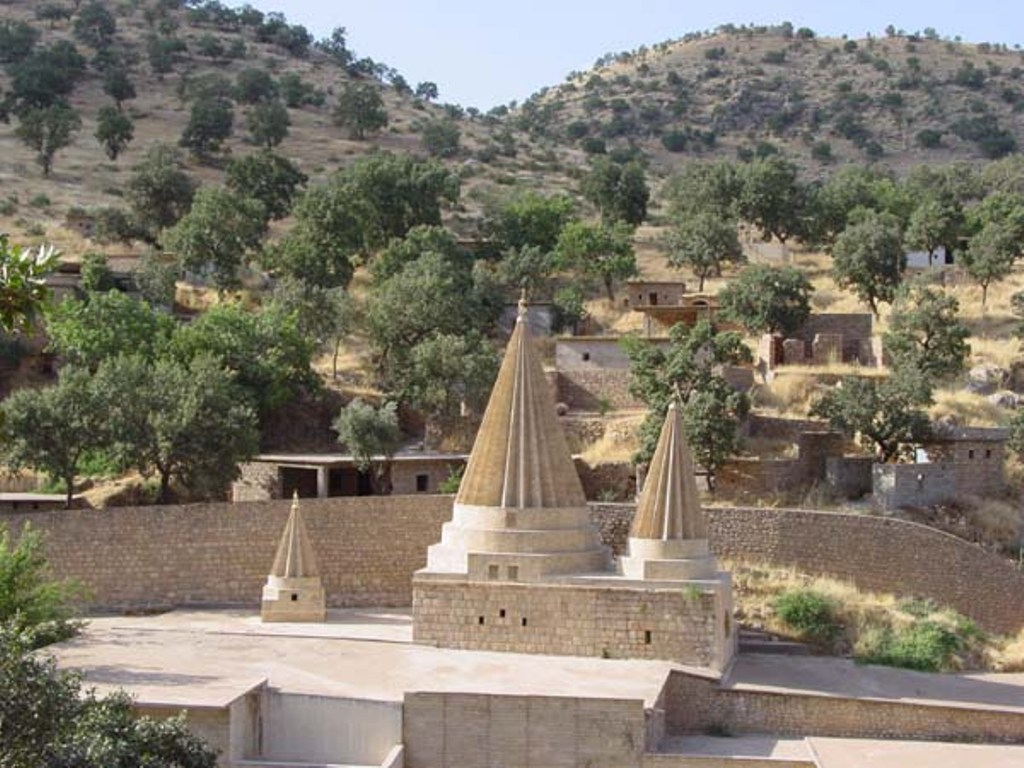
Yazidi temples in Lalish

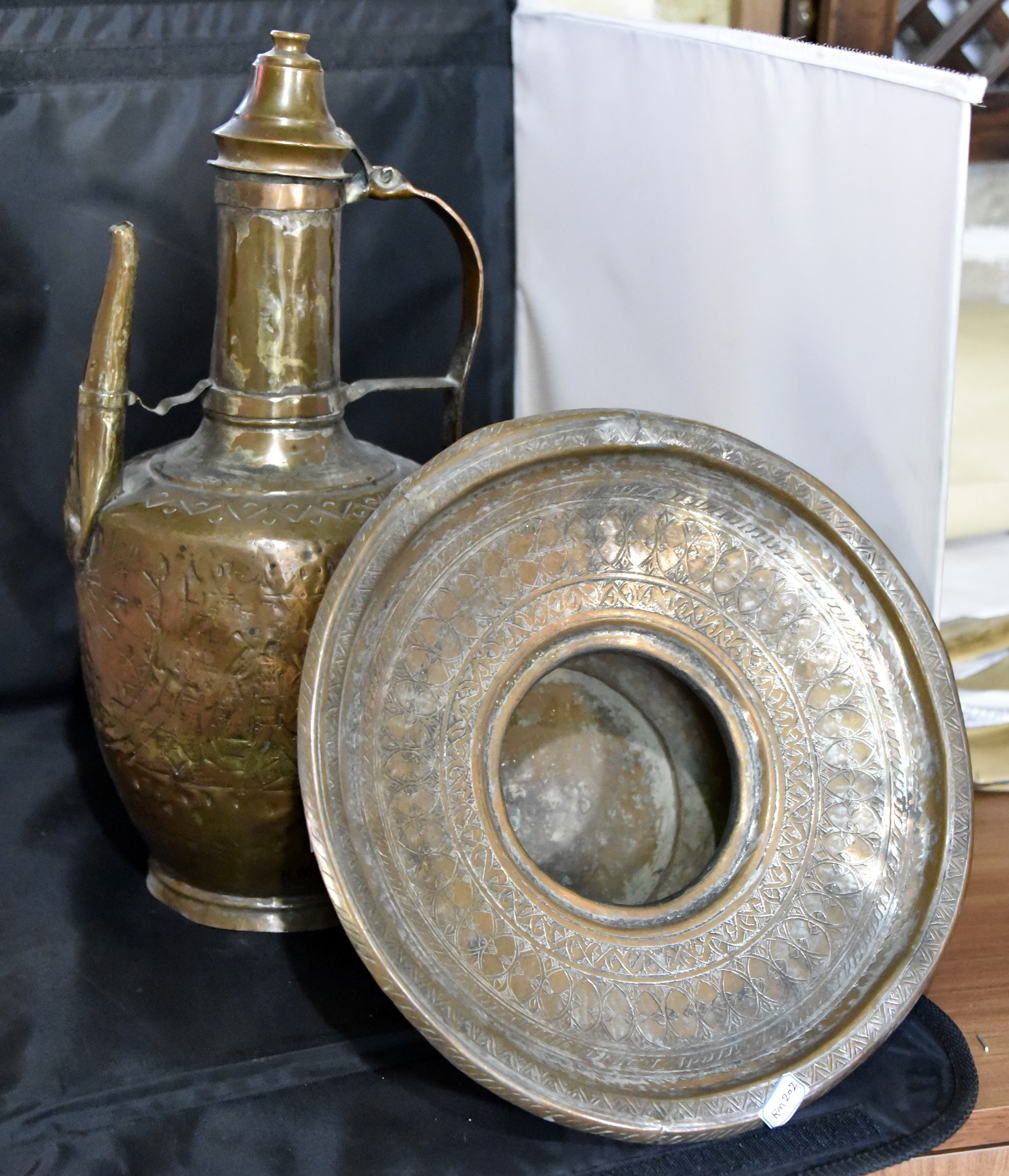
Jewish ritualistic items displayed at the Kurd's Heritage Museum, Sulaymaniyah

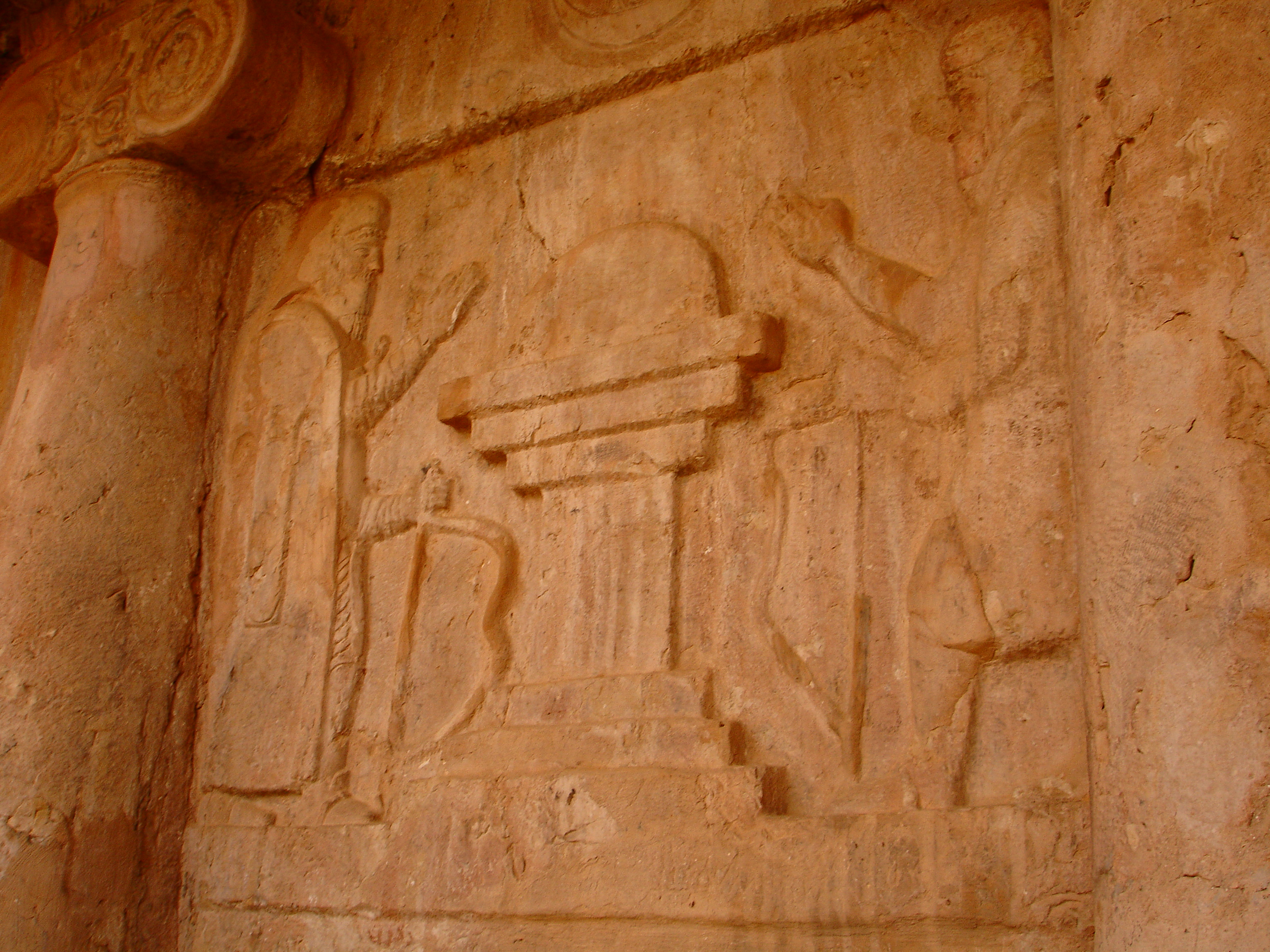
Remains of the Zoroastrian/Mithraic Qyzqapan tomb near Sulaymaniyah

== Education ==
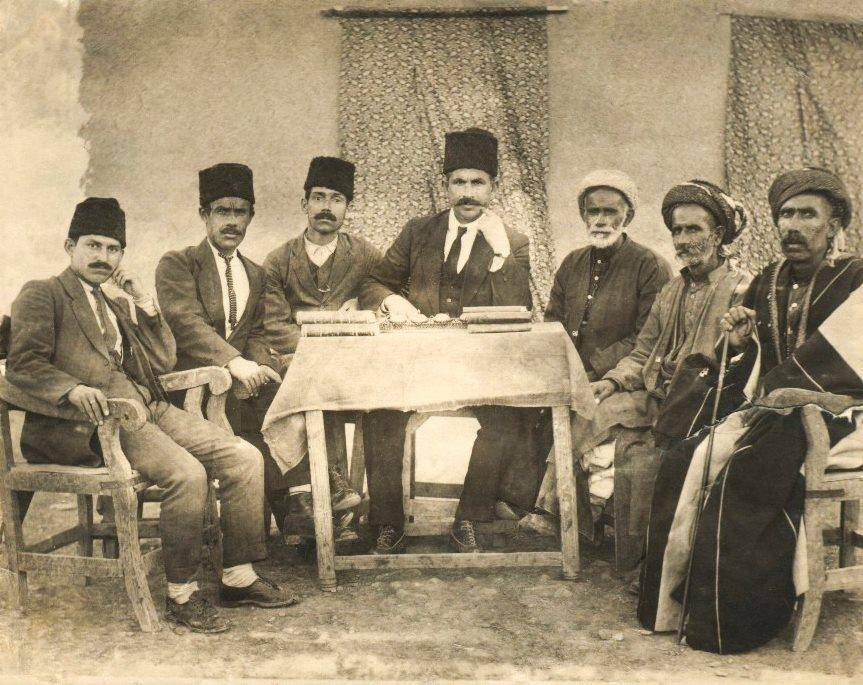
Teachers of a Kurdish primary school in Sulaymaniyah, Iraqi Kurdistan, in 1924.

Under the policy of Arabization, Ba'athist Iraq aggressively restricted the use of Kurdish in schools. Arab students were reportedly used as informants to enforce the ban, while incentives were offered to families to enroll their children in Arabic-language schools. Significant changes were made to the education system following the establishment of the KRG in 1992. The KRG assumed control over the curriculum, began supervising and printing Kurdish-language textbooks and other educational materials, facilitated the widespread use of Kurdish as a language of instruction, and removed content from older materials considered pro-Ba'athist, pro-Arabist, or chauvinistic. The Kurdish diaspora, France Libertés, the Kurdish Institute of Paris, and UNESCO supported these efforts by providing alternative Kurdish-language textbooks to the region. Following the constitutional recognition of the Kurdistan Region in 2005, the KRG's Ministry of Education (MoE) expanded the production of Kurdish-language textbooks. Together with the KRG's Ministry of Higher Education and Scientific Research, it now administers the region's education system independently of the federal Iraqi government with its distinct curricula and languages of instruction.

The education system in the Kurdistan region
Stage	Grades	Age	Mandatory
Pre-basic education	Kindergarten	4–5	No
Basic education	1–9	6–14	Yes
High school	10–12	15–17	No

The educational stages in the Kurdistan Region are based on the K–12 education system and are similar to those in the rest of Iraq, except that compulsory education extends through grade 9, corresponding to basic education, compared with grade 6 in the rest of the country. After passing the national examination at the end of grade 9, students complete basic education. They can then pursue further education at a high school, vocational school, or Institute of Specialists. This system mirrors similar educational structures such as in Egypt, Germany, and Tunisia. Students who complete high school by passing another national examination, or graduate from an Institute of Specialists, which requires two additional years of study, can pursue a bachelor's degree at a university, followed by a master's degree and, for some, a PhD. In 2007, the KRG undertook major reforms to the education system, including modernizing the existing curriculum, restructuring educational stages, and revising the requirements for becoming a teacher. The education system is teacher-centered and employs a banking model, with teachers regarded as authorities akin to parents, and places a strong emphasis on memorization. In 2014, the Kurdistan Region had approximately 1.5 million students in basic education and high schools.

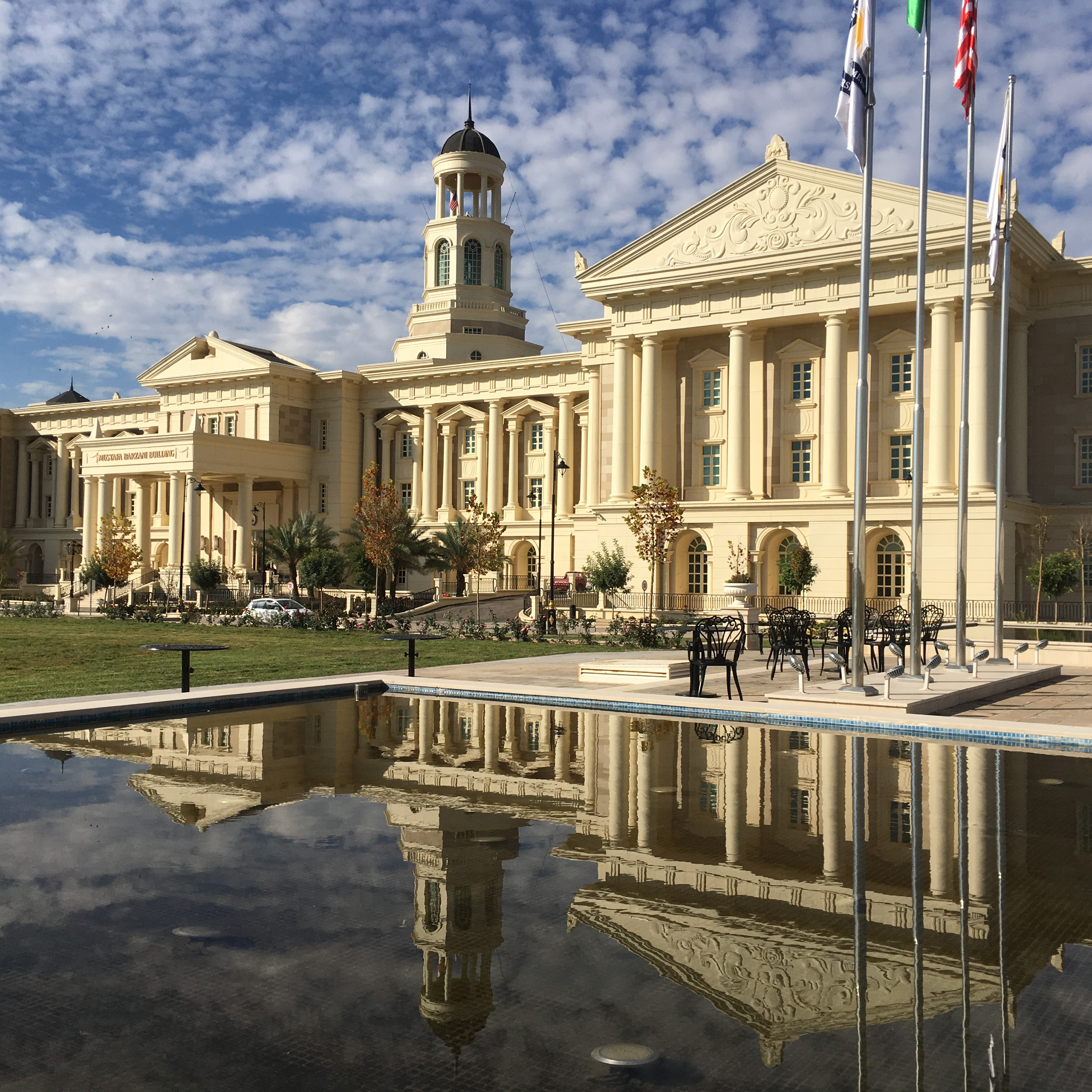
Front of the Mustafa Barzani Building at the American University of Kurdistan (AUK) in 2018.

Higher education is overseen by the KRG's Ministry of Higher Education and Scientific Research, which implements its own quality assurance mechanisms for universities in the region. As of 2018, there were 15 public and 15 private universities serving several of the region's larger cities. The oldest university in the region is the University of Sulaimani, which ranks first in the Kurdistan Region and third countrywide, while Salahaddin University–Erbil and the University of Duhok are also among the region's older and more prestigious universities. Under the KRG, the University of Kurdistan Hewlêr, the region's first public English-language university, began operations in 2006. From 2003 onward, many other higher education institutions were established across the region, including specialized institutions such as Hawler Medical University and various polytechnic schools. There are also several international universities and schools, such as the American University of Kurdistan (AUK), the American University of Iraq, Sulaimani (AUIS) and the International School of Choueifat, which is the region's first international school. Students from the rest of Iraq cannot directly apply for admission to universities in the Kurdistan Region and can only transfer from other universities in Iraq. The KRG-funded Human Capacity Development Program in Higher Education (HCDP) provides US$100 million annually for graduate students from the Kurdistan Region to study at universities abroad.

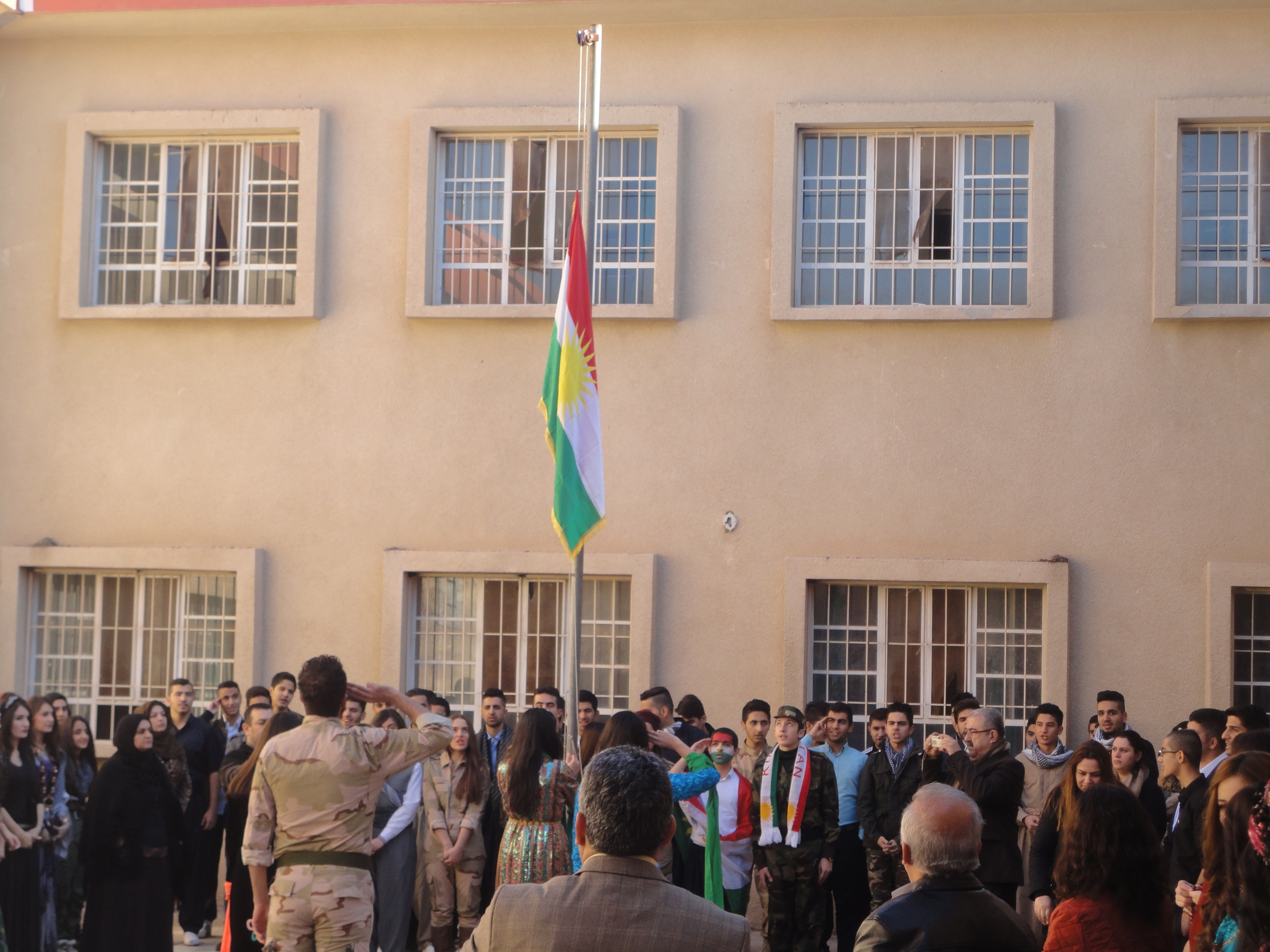
Students observe the raising of the Kurdistan flag at a school in Sulaymaniyah.

Unlike in the rest of Iraq, Kurdish is taught as a standalone subject and is also the primary medium of instruction. Arabic and English are also taught as foreign languages. However, a generation of Kurdish youth has grown up and, to a large extent, been educated with little or no knowledge of Arabic. English, meanwhile, has increasingly become a lingua franca, particularly among younger generations in Erbil city, as the number of schools using English as the medium of instruction has grown. English is also used as a medium of instruction for science courses at some universities in the Kurdistan Region. Educational content can range from slightly to substantially different from that of the rest of Iraq, with history in particular being taught from a more traditionally Kurdish nationalist perspective. According to Kirmanj and Benigo, the KRG uses its control over the education system to foster Kurdish national identity, distinguish the Kurdistan Region from the rest of Iraq, and engage in nation-building, particularly through textbooks. KRG textbooks across multiple grade levels incorporate maps, metaphors, and poems relating to Kurdish culture, including references to Newroz in first-grade textbooks. Boys and girls featured in examples in KRG textbooks are often given specifically Kurdish names rather than more common Muslim names, including historical names such as Sherko ("lion") and aspirational names such as Kurdistan, Welat ("homeland"), and Azad ("free"). While not embracing feminism, KRG textbooks feature boys and girls playing together or holding hands, which is atypical in muslim countries but common among Kurdish society. Textbooks encourage girls to pursue leadership roles, for example by featuring the poem "A Kurdish Girl" ("Keça Kurd") by Cegerxwîn or highlighting Leyla Qasim's role in the Kurdish political movement. KRG history textbooks depict Kurdistan as a nation with deep roots in the region by linking it to ancient populations such as the Subarians, Lullubi, Gutians, Cyrtians, and Carduchians, with particular emphasis on the Medes as the "forefathers" of the Kurds. The disputed city of Kirkuk is frequently mentioned and described as having "always been" a Kurdish city.

Critics argue that the education system suffers from politicization, bureaucratization, and relatively low standards, resulting in significant gaps. One example is the region's still relatively high illiteracy rate, which stood at 16.23% in 2024, compared with 15.31% for the rest of Iraq. However, these problems may be partially attributable to the long term effects of the Iraqi–Kurdish conflict, especially the Anfal campaign, and the effects of the war against the Islamic State, including the mass arrival of refugees and internally displaced people from the rest of Iraq, which placed significant pressure on public services, including education, amid severe economic turbulence. Prior to the events of 2014, the World Bank assessed that the KRG had "made remarkable progress in all aspects of its education system, comparing favorably with neighboring countries," while a 2005 assessment in the Third World Quarterly described schools in the region as "certainly quite good by regional standards."

== Culture ==
The culture of the Kurdistan Region is primarily Kurdish, with distinct traditions in music, dance, clothing, cuisine, and festivals that differentiate it from other parts of Iraq.

=== Museums ===
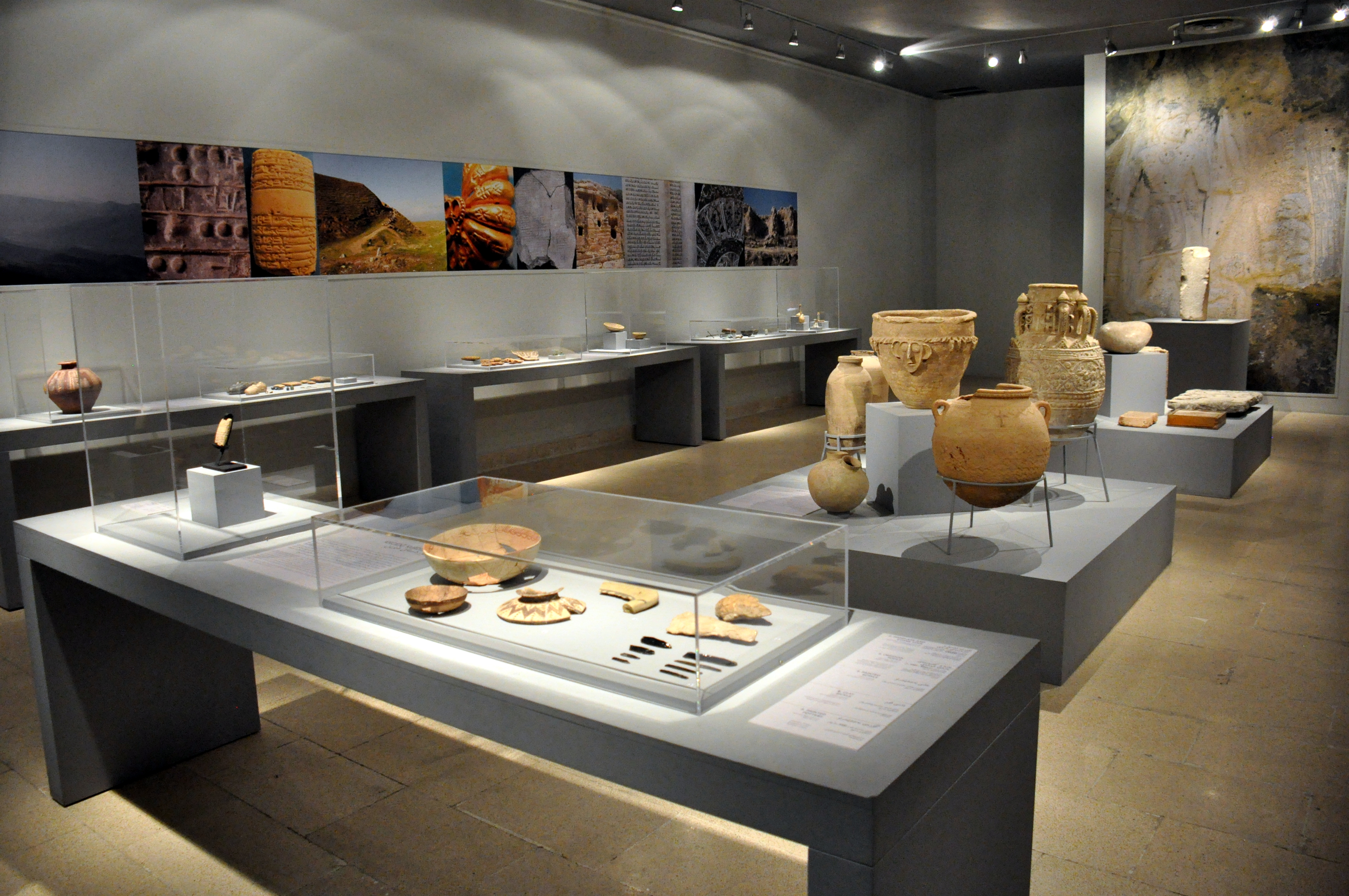
Ancient artifacts being displayed at the Sulaymaniyah Museum in 2021.

The most prominent museums in Erbil include the Erbil Civilization Museum, the second-largest in the region, which displays artifacts dating back over 60,000 years, and the Kurdish Textile and Cultural Museum. In Sulaymaniyah, notable institutions include the Amna Suraka Museum, the Kurd's Heritage Museum, which exhibits clothing, jewelry, manuscripts, and household items from the past several centuries, as well as materials related to the city's Jewish community, and the Sulaymaniyah Museum, which houses significant artifacts including a tablet of the Epic of Gilgamesh. These museums have received support from the Kurdistan Regional Government, UNESCO, and several European universities. Smaller local museums, and beyond historical and Kurdish-focused institutions, are also found throughout the region, including the Syriac Heritage Museum, Erbil Stones and Gems Museum, Erbil Currency Museum, Duhok Archaeological Museum, Zakho Historical and Heritage Museum and the Illusion Museum Erbil.

On 11 April 2016, plans were announced for the construction of the Kurdistan Museum at the base of the Erbil Citadel, designed by architect Daniel Libeskind in collaboration with the Kurdistan Memory Programme. Planned as a 150,000-square-foot facility, it was intended to be the largest and most modern museum in the region, serving as a national archive and housing collections of film, multimedia, documents, and artifacts, alongside spaces for permanent and temporary exhibitions, educational resources, and community use. As of 2025, construction is ongoing.

=== Music ===
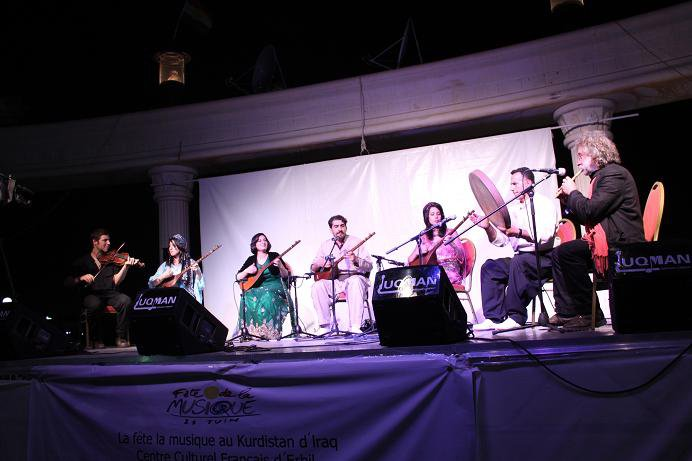
Ensemble concert in Erbil, 2011.

The Kurdistan Region plays an important role in the institutionalization of Kurdish music, which until recently was largely transmitted orally and remained locally rooted. Institutions involved in music education, archiving, and publishing include the Sulaymaniyah Institute of Fine Arts (Silêmanî Peymangay Hunere Cwanekan), the College of Fine Arts at the University of Sulaymaniyah, and the Kurdish Heritage Institute.

The KRI regularly promotes and hosts exiled Kurdish musicians from other parts of Kurdistan, such as Ciwan Haco and Şivan Perwer, and has also provided a platform for non-Kurdish regional artists fleeing conflict, such as Arab music star Omar Souleyman. Its growing relations with Turkey facilitated Şivan Perwer's return and a concert in Diyarbakir in 2013.

In 2017, KurdSat produced Kurd Idol. The show was part of the Idols franchise, retaining its basic format and promoting pan-Kurdish musical culture by featuring singers from across Kurdistan and the diaspora. Judges included Adnan Karim, Nizamettin Ariç, Bîjen Kamkar, and Kanî.

=== Media ===
Media in the Kurdistan Region expanded rapidly after gaining de facto autonomy in 1992, building on earlier radio and print outlets. Kurdistan TV and KurdSat were among the first television channels launched in the region. Today the media landscape of the Kurdistan Region is highly politicized, with significant influence from the KDP and PUK. However, especially after the war against the Islamic State, it has expanded its reach to global audiences, has contributed to international coverage of developments in the Kurdistan Region, and has reached policymakers in institutions such as the United Nations, the White House, the European Union, China, and international forums. According to the Kurdistan Union of Journalists (KUJ), 1,400 media outlets, including 30 satellite television channels and 127 terrestrial television channels, as well as numerous websites and social media pages, are active in the region. Major media outlets include: Rudaw, Kurdistan24, Zagros TV, and Channel 8.

=== Sports ===
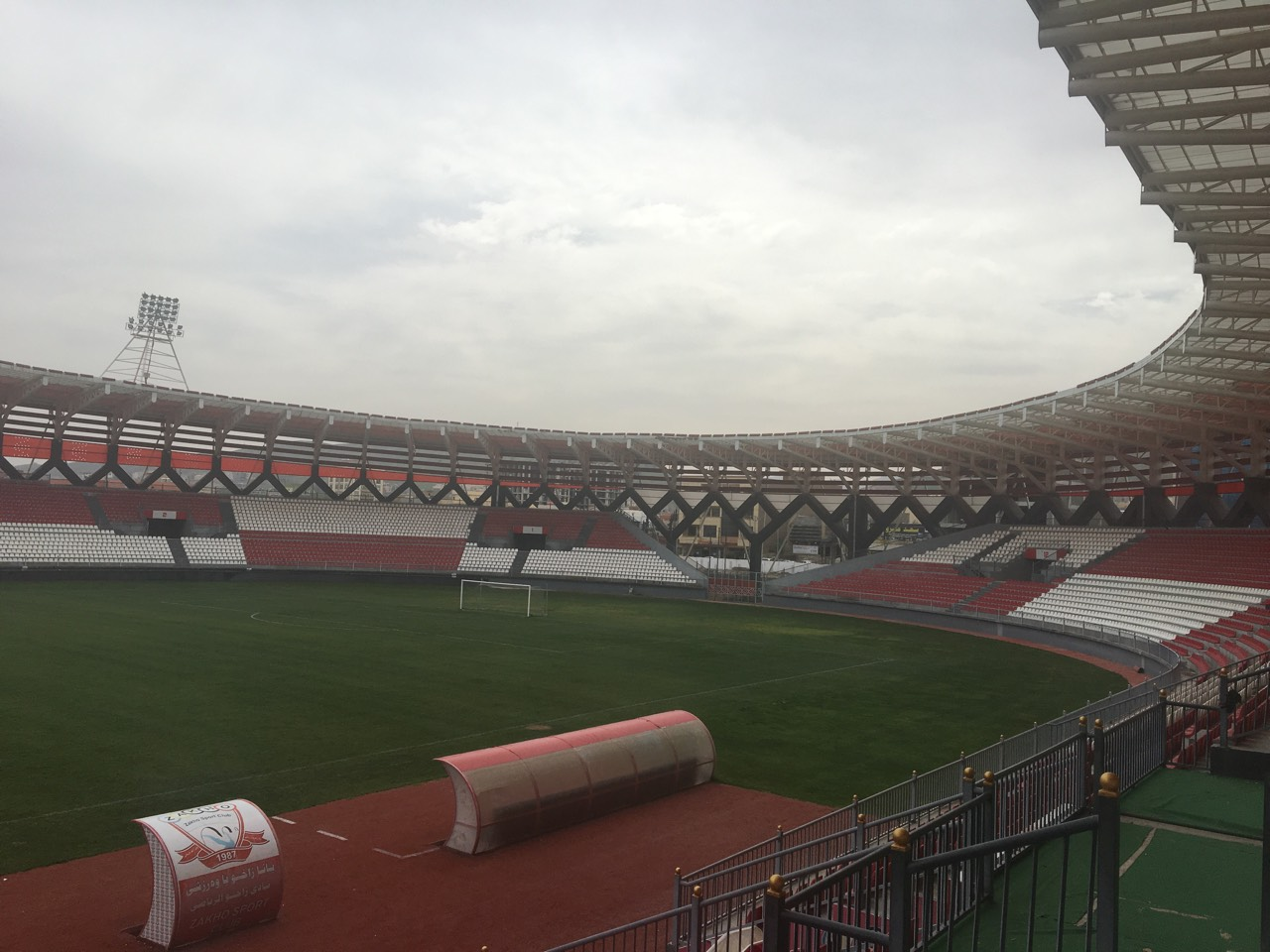
Football stadium of Zakho SC in 2018.

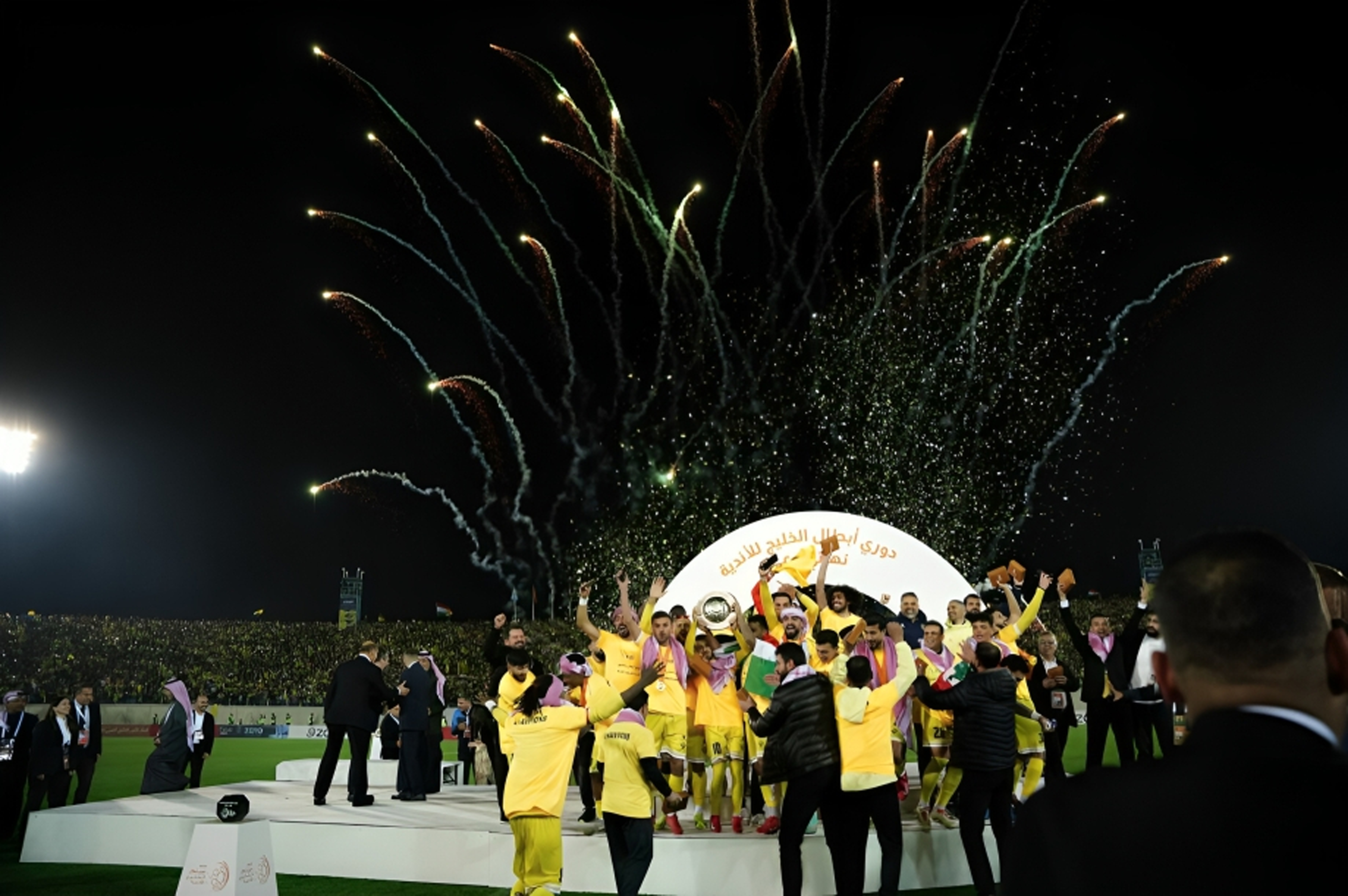
Duhok SC celebration after winning the 2025 Gulf Club Champions League Final.

Football is the most popular sport in the Kurdistan Region, and its leagues are supervised by the Kurdistan Football Association, which is financially supported by the KRG. Leagues include the Kurdistan Premier League, first and second divisions, the Kurdistan Cup, as well as futsal and youth and adult leagues. Football stadiums include Franso Hariri Stadium, Duhok Stadium, Zakho International Stadium, Newroz International Stadium, and Halabja Stadium. The "Bahdinan rivalry" between Zakho SC and Duhok SC is among the fiercest in the region. The rivalry between Zakho SC and Erbil SC is known as the "Kurdish derby". Similar to other sectors of life in the Kurdistan Region, football is also politicized by political parties, which often assume leadership roles in clubs and provide financial support, as seen in the relationships between Lahur Talabani and Newroz SC, and between Qubad Talabani and Sulaymaniya SC. The Kurdistan Region national football team is not affiliated with FIFA or the Asian Football Confederation, but has participated in the Viva World Cup.

Apart from football, rugby has gained popularity in recent years. The Kurdistan Rugby Team, established in 2013, represents the Kurdistan Region at regional and international level in tournaments such as the Dubai Sevens in 2015, 2016, and 2018. On 20 April 2019, it played against the Iraqi Rugby Association, winning 25–5, a result regarded as a milestone in the development of rugby in the region.

=== Holidays ===
The following is a list of public holidays in the Kurdistan Region for the year 2026:

Date	Name	Note
1 January	New Year's Day	
5 March	Uprising Day	Commemorates the 1991 uprising against the Iraqi Ba'ath regime
11 March	Anniversary of 1970 autonomy agreement	
14 March	Birthday of Mustafa Barzani	
20–22 March	Eid-al-Fitr	
21–23 March	Newroz	Most important and widely celebrated public holiday.
1 April	Akitu	
5 April	Easter	Extended three-day holiday for Christians.
9 April	Baghdad Liberation Day	Commemorates the fall of the Iraqi Ba'ath regime following the fall of Baghdad.
15 April	Yazidi New Year	
1 May	International Labour Day	
14 May	Feast of the Ascension	Only for Christians.
27–30 May	Eid al-Adha	
16 June	Muharram	
25 June	Ashura	
12 July	Nusrdel	Only for Assyrians.
14 July	14 July Revolution Day	
31 July–2 August	Peak of Summer festival	Three-day holiday for Yazidis.
25 August	Mawlid	
6–12 October	Jama Feast	Only for Yazidis.
18 December	Feast of Ezid	Only for Yazidis.
25 December	Christmas	Extended holiday until 26 December for Christians.

== See also ==
- List of populated places in Kurdistan Region
- List of archaeological sites in Erbil Governorate
- Lake Felaw
- Rojava
