= Middle East Peace and Security Forum =

Annual conference held in Dohuk, Kurdistan Region of Iraq

The Middle East Peace and Security Forum (MEPS) (Kurdish: کۆڕبەندی ئاشتی و ئاسایشی ڕۆژھەڵاتی ناوەڕاست) is an annual conference on developments in Middle Eastern geopolitics and security, as well as related international issues, held in Duhok, Kurdistan Region, Iraq since 2019. It brings together stakeholders from the Kurdistan Regional Government (KRG), the Iraqi government, the wider region, and the international community. The forum is organized by the American University of Kurdistan (AUK).
