= Kurdish Heritage Institute =

Non-governmental organization in Iraq

- Building of the Kurdish Heritage Institute in 2003.

- Location within Iraqi Kurdistan
- Established: 2003
- Location: Sulaymaniyah, Kurdistan Region, Iraq
- Coordinates: 35.561785°N 45.429147°E
- Collection size: 15,000–30,000
- Director: Mazhar Khaleqi
- Website: khi.krd

The Kurdish Heritage Institute is a non-governmental organization for preserving Kurdish heritage and music based in Sulaymaniyah, Kurdistan Region, Iraq.

== Details ==
The institute is headed by Mazhar Khaleqi, an Iranian Kurdish singer who had gone into exile in the United Kingdom following the Iranian Revolution in 1979. Khaleqi "started traveling to Iraqi Kurdistan in 2003, where he established the Kurdish Heritage Institute to preserve traditional Kurdish musical genres, melodies and other folklore."

Amed Demirhan, a renowned librarian, has been working on a project to digitise the KHI collection of over 10,000 books using a high speed scanner. Khaleqi has also told Al-Monitor that he has collected around 20,000 melodies and stories dating back around 600 years.

The KHI's representative in Turkey, Seyda Goyan, told Rudaw that "The institute aims to protect melodies that are on the verge of disappearance. We work to renew them once again... We archive Kurdish traditional dishes and clothing and rewrite various Kurdish maqams and shaiy [Kurdish dance] texts."

In 2019, the US Embassy in Iraq announced that it would fund the digitisation of the collections of the KHI with a $150,000 grant. A press release stated that "The project will provide a complete program for digitizing online KHI archives, including a library of 15,000 special books as well as 3,000 culturally significant photos, 23,000 audio and video files."

In March 2019, it was announced that: "The Council on Library and Information Resources (CLIR) has received a $149,880 grant from the US Embassy in Baghdad for a project to digitize collections of the Kurdish Heritage Institute (KHI) in Sulaymaniyah in Iraqi Kurdistan."
