= American University of Kurdistan =

University in Duhok, Kurdistan, Iraq

Coordinates: 36.8614°N 42.8616°E

The American University of Kurdistan
- Sorani Kurdish: زانینگەها ئەمریکی یا کوردستانێ; Arabic: الجامعة_الأمريكية_في_کردستان
- Latin: Universitas Americana Kurdistanensis
- Motto: Your Path to Excellence
- Type: Public, non-profit
- Established: 2014
- Endowment: giving.auk.edu.krd/Endowment
- Chairman: H.E. Masrour Barzani
- President: Dr. Randall Rhodes
- Provost: Dr. Triona Croke
- Academic staff: Approximately 100 academic staff across various colleges and disciplines
- Students: 943
- Undergraduates: 943
- Location: Duhok, Duhok Governorate, Kurdistan Region, Iraq
- Language: English language
- Colors: Navy, White and Yellow
- Mascot: Cengo the Leopard
- Website: auk.edu.krd

The American University of Kurdistan (AUK) (Sorani Kurdish: زانكۆی ئەمریکیی کوردستان, Zanîngeha Emrîkî ya Kurdistanê; Arabic: الجامعة الأمريكية في كردستان) is a public, not-for-profit, university in Duhok, Kurdistan Region of Iraq. It was founded in 2014 to provide comprehensive liberal arts education and to encourage cross-disciplinary research in the region.

The university hosts the annual Middle East Peace and Security Forum (MEPS).

== See also ==
- List of universities in Iraq
