= Sayyah =

Sleeveless garment worn in Iraq

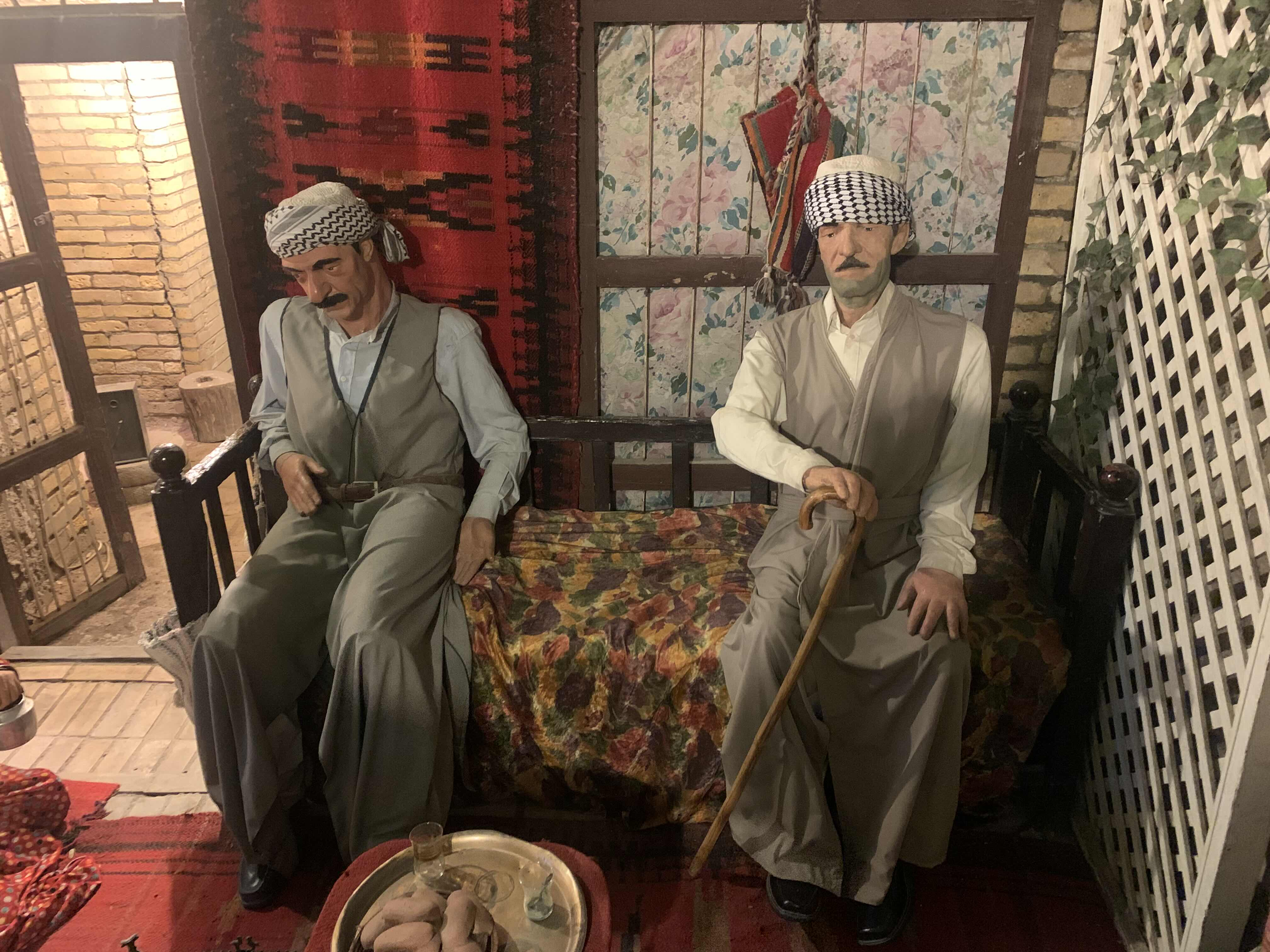
Wax figures of two Iraqi men wearing the sayyah over their dishdashas from the Baghdadi Museum

The Sayyah (Arabic: صاية) is a sleeveless garment that covers the ankles worn by traditionally Iraqis beneath the dishdasha. Typically made from several types of wool, the best quality garments were made by weavers in Baghdad, and thus became associated with the city. It was also worn by Arab Bedouins of Northern Iraq.

== See also ==
- Dishdasha
- Qaba
