= List of museums in Iraq =

This is a list of museums in Iraq.

== Museums in Iraq ==
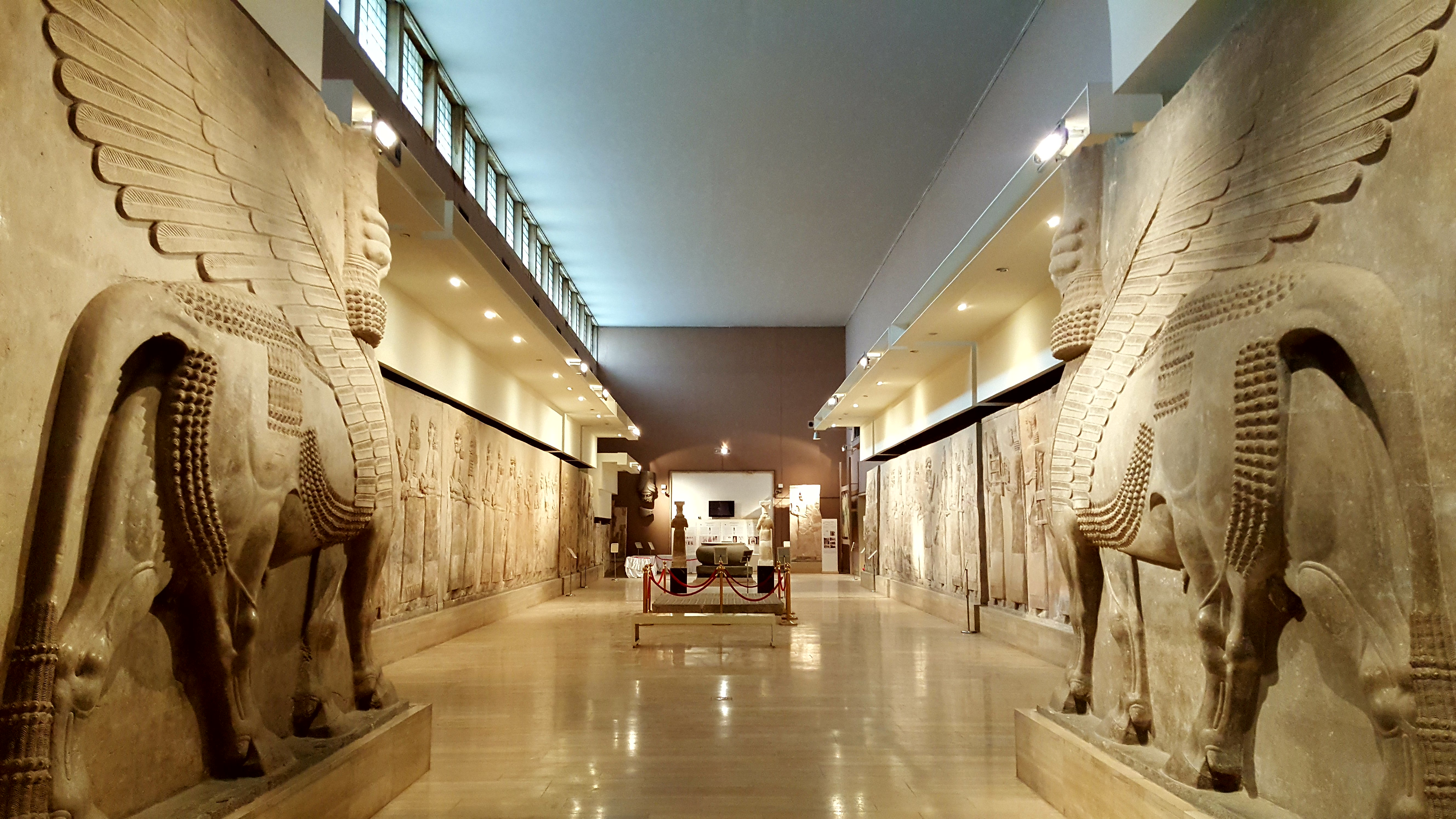
- Iraq Museum, Baghdad
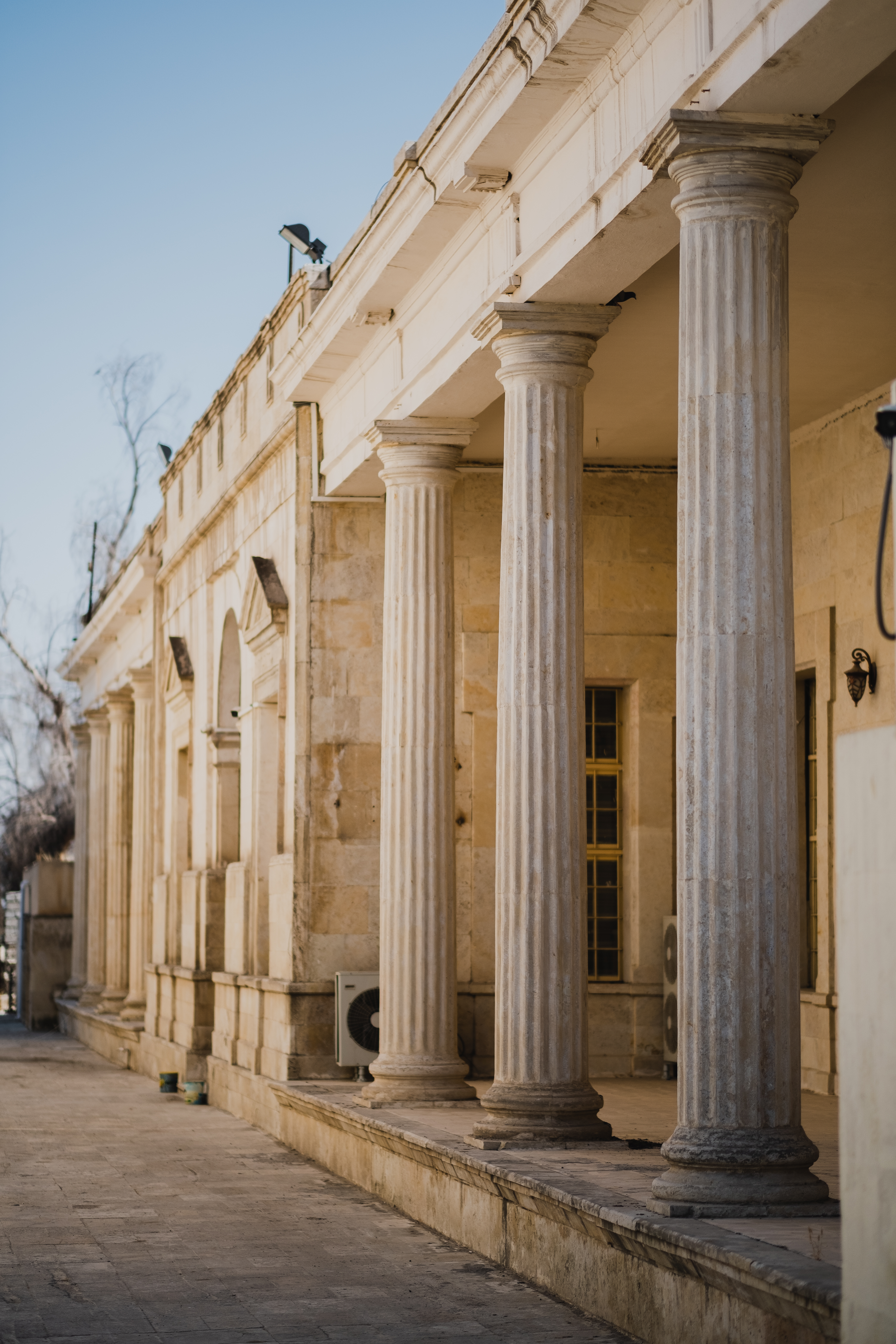
  Mosul Museum is the second largest museum in Iraq after the National Museum of Iraq in Baghdad. It containins ancient Mesopotamian artifacts.
  Amna Suraka Prison
- Baghdadi Museum
- Basrah Museum
- Ennigaldi-Nanna's museum
- Illusion Museum Erbil
- Erbil Civilization Museum
- Kurdish Textile Museum
- Kurd's Heritage Museum
- Memory Islam Museum
- Mosul Museum
- Museum of Samarra
- Nasiriyah Museum
- National Museum of Iraq
- Sherwana Castle
- Syriac Heritage Museum
- Sulaymaniyah Museum
- Tikrit Museum
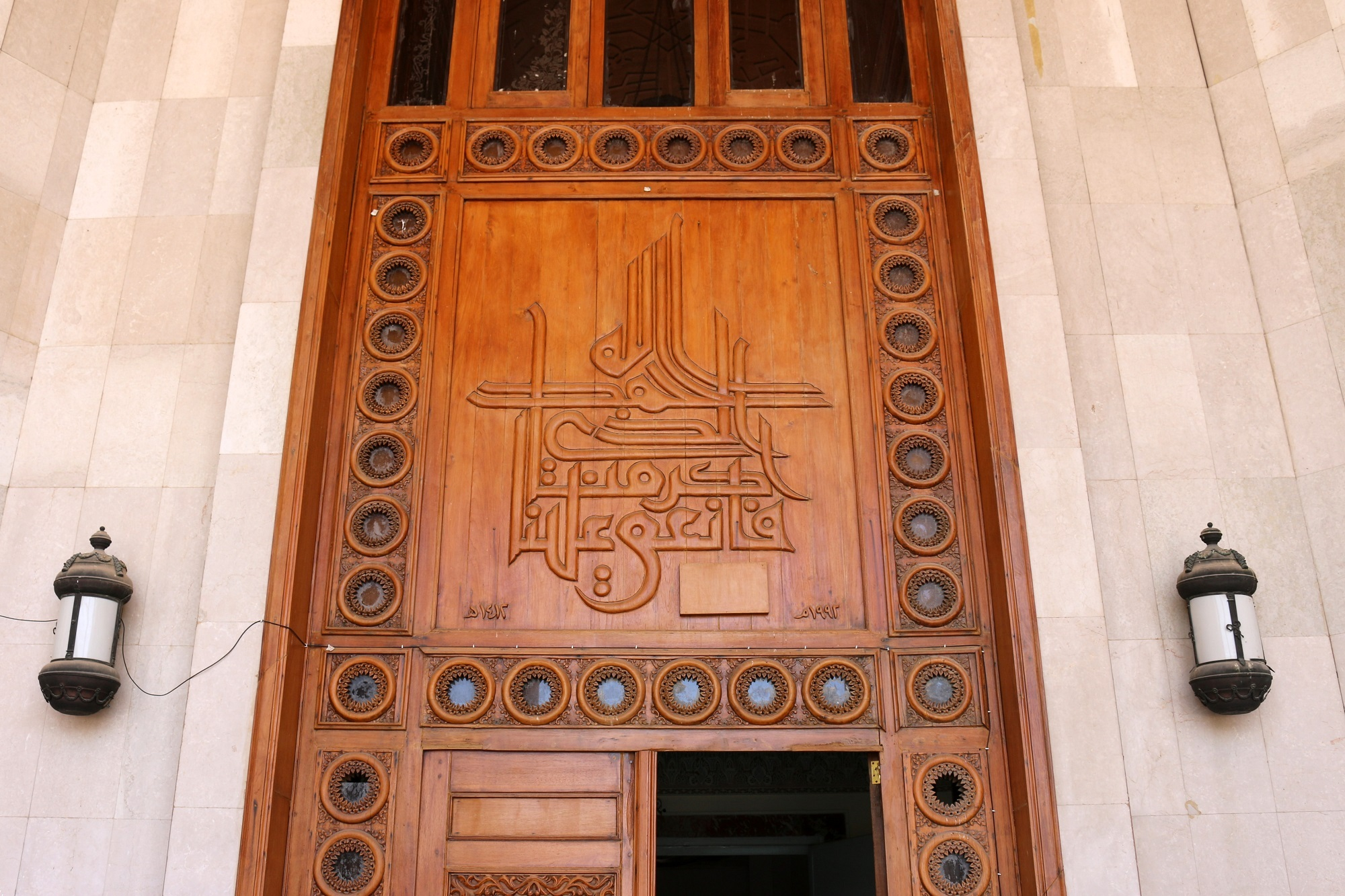
  Basra Museum
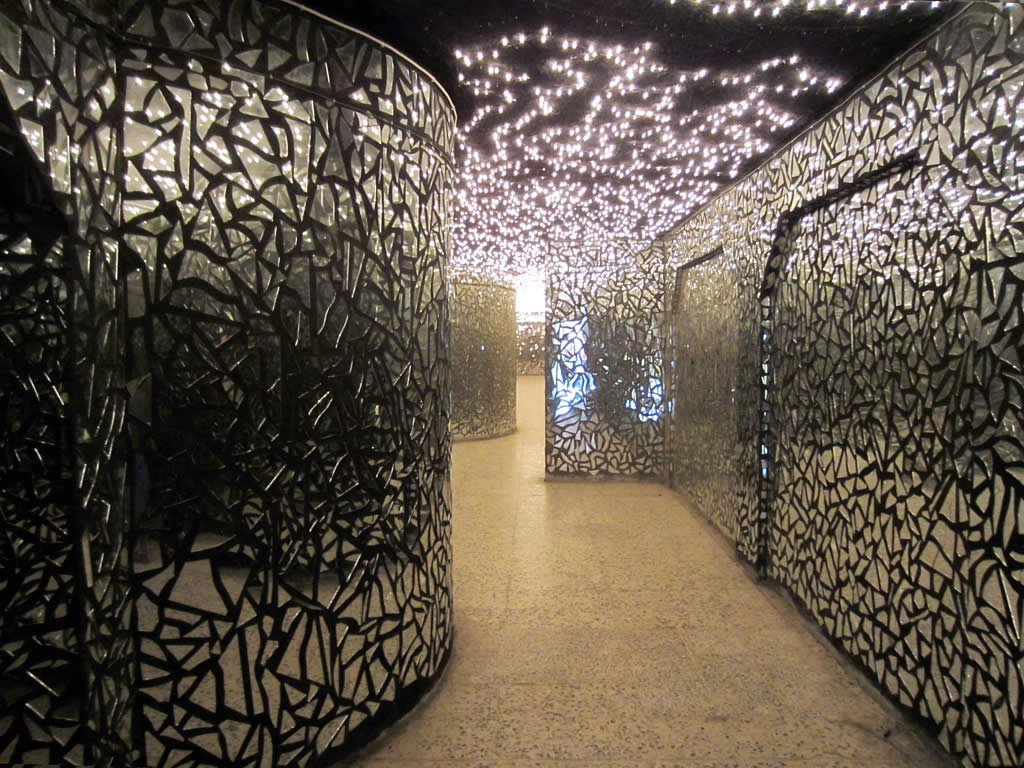
  Amna Suraka
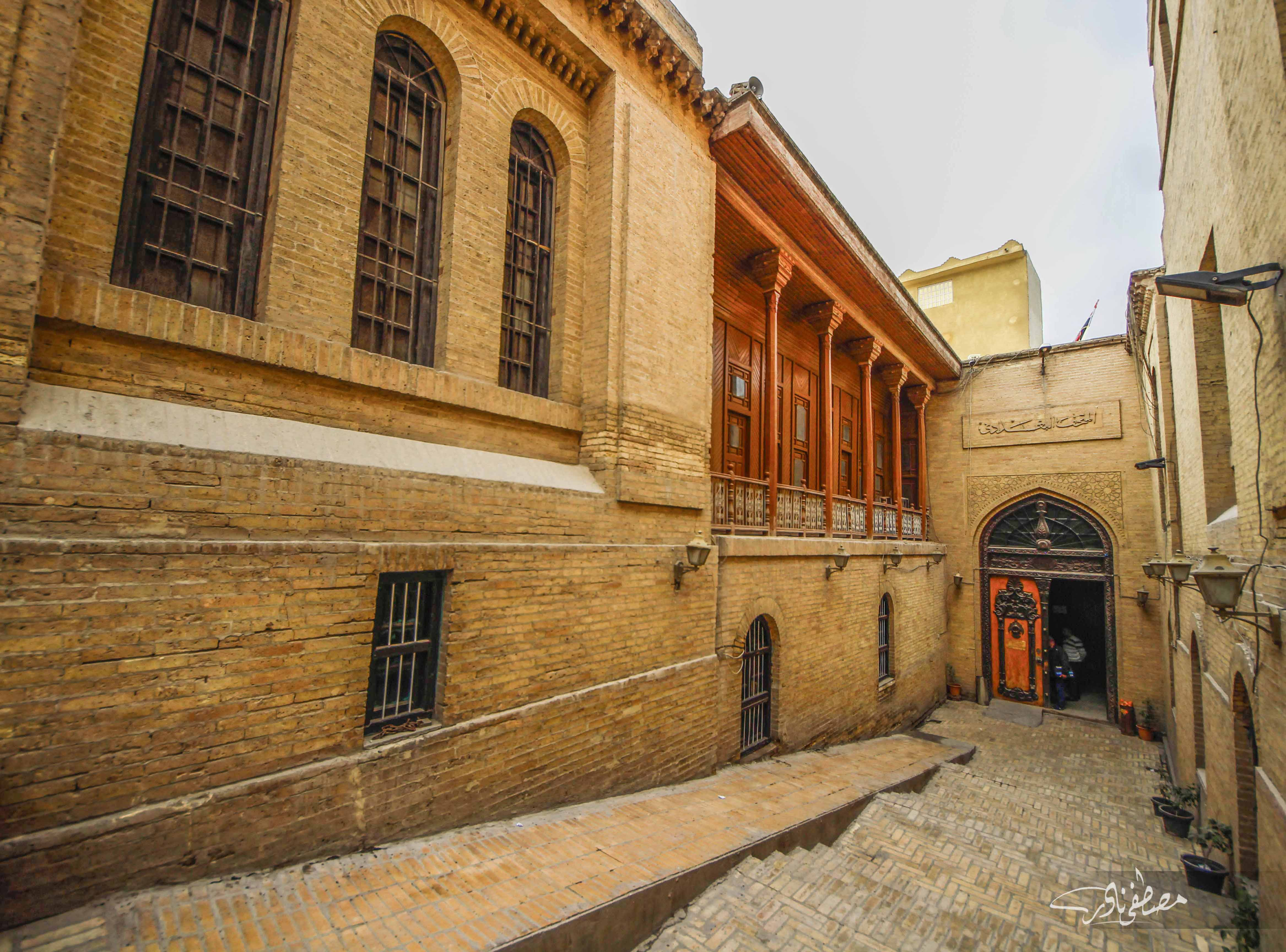
  Baghdadi Museum
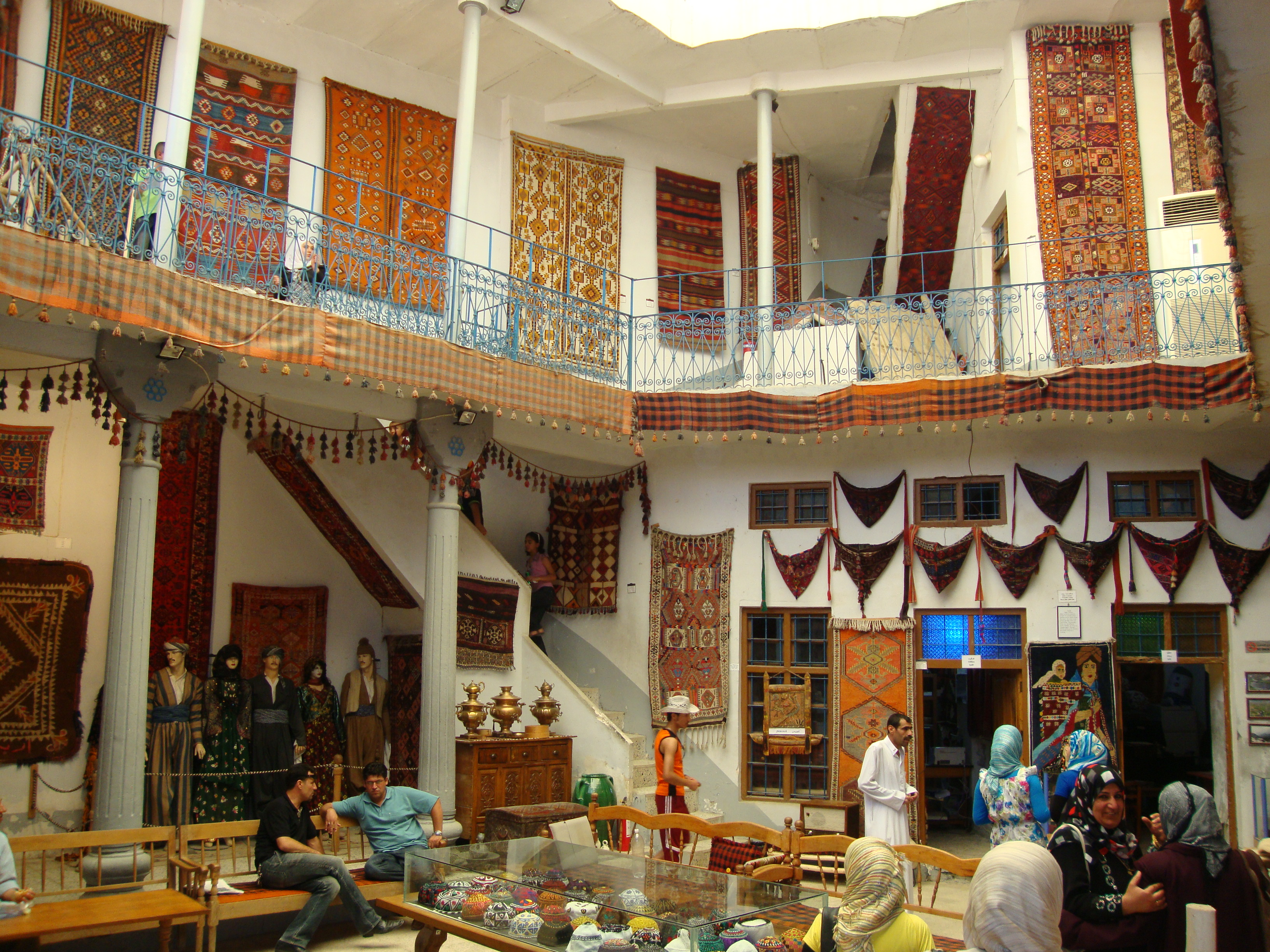
  Kurdish Textile Museum

== See also ==
- List of museums
