= Dilshad Meriwani =

Kurdish poet and activist (1947–1989)

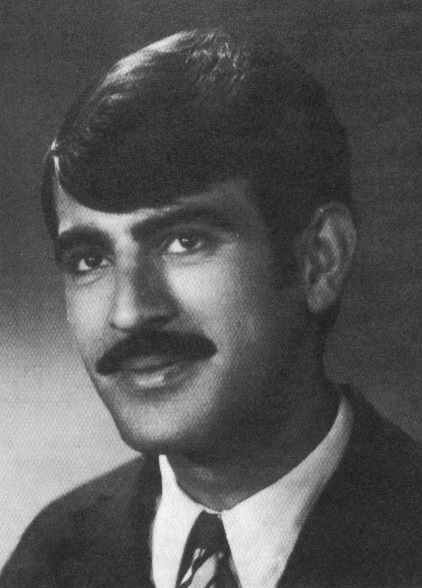
- Born: Dilshad Muhammad Amin Fatah; 28 March 1947; Slemani, Iraqi Kurdistan
- Died: 13 March 1989 (aged 41); Amna Suraka (lit. Red Prison)
- Cause of death: Execution (Gunshot wound to the head)
- Education: University of Baghdad
- Occupations: Poet, critic, activist, revolutionary
- Years active: 1959–1989
- Spouse: Şîrîn Kemal Eḥmed Saļiḥ alias Sirin K. (b. 1954)
- Children: 3

Dilshad Muhammad Amin Fatah (March 28, 1947 – March 13, 1989), better known by his pen name "Dilshad Meriwani", was a Kurdish poet, playwright, actor, critic, essayist, teacher and a translator who was executed by the Iraqi government during the Saddam Hussein era on March 13, 1989, for teaching the Kurdish Latin alphabet to his students.

== Life and career ==
Fatah was born on March 28, 1947, in Slemani, Iraqi Kurdistan. He graduated in 1972 from the University of Baghdad in Kurdish Language and Literature. Meriwani was active in the Students' Union from 1959 to 1962.

From 1962 to 1966, Fatah was involved in his co-founded Society for the Revival of Kurdish National Resources (Note: Natively called Komeley Bûjandinewey Samanî Netewayetî Kurd.), an underground literary and artistic organization which published resistance works (Note: It included works by Kurdish writers and many translations of Arabic, Persian and European resistance poetry.) which were distributed hand-by-hand. In March 1963, he started participating in political activities and engaged in clandestine struggle which resulted in his being imprisoned, tortured and exiled multiple times. He experienced guerrilla life in the city beginning from the revolution of 1961 to the revolution of June 1976. While in the mountains as a pêşmerge between 1983 and 1985.

Fatah married Şîrîn Kemal Eḥmed Saļiḥ (Note: She was more commonly known by her pen name "Sirin K.".), a Kurdish poet, in 1975, who belonged to an active political Kurd family. Dilshad and Sirin did not live together or have a home till 1978 due to exile, imprisonment and work. They had three daughters.

In September 1984, Fatah abandoned all political activity and returned to writing. He committed himself to being a teacher. Throughout his life, he composed, translated and produced more than 17 plays, including his popular resistance play 'Çawî Vietnam' (Vietnam's Eye, 1973). He performed in two plays and starred in a 12-minute film in 1972. Merwani translated both eastern and western resistance poetry to Kurdish language, including the works of Mayakovsky, Darwīsh, Neruda, Éluard and Yesenin. Among his complete works are 8 poems, 2 collections of stories and a work on literary criticism. For 12 years, he presented several readings, literary and cultural lectures, and critical gatherings in cities such as Slemani, Hawler, Duhok and Baghdad.

In public service, Fatah served as a language supervisor for the Ministry of Information and was a Technical Instructor in the Department of Kurdish Language and Literature. He was a guest professor at Slemani University for a month. He was also a journalist at the Ministry of Transport in Baghdad, and an editor of the Risala magazine.

After several years of publishing political plays, poems, and essays, the Ba'athist dictator regime arrested and executed Fatah on 13 March 1989, aged 41, in Amna Suraka. He was executed for his programme of teaching the Kurdish Latin alphabet to Kurdish schoolchildren. The regime did not allow his family to give him a funeral and his burial place is unknown.
