= Syriac Heritage Museum =

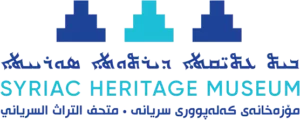
- Established: 2015
- Location: Ankawa, Erbil Governorate, Kurdistan Region, Iraq
- Coordinates: 36°14′03.2″N 43°59′19.4″E
- Type: Cultural history museum
- Website: www.syriacmuseum.com

The Syriac Heritage Museum is a museum in Erbil, in the Kurdistan Region of Iraq.

The museum is one of the most significant museums in the city of Erbil. It is located within the Christian neighbourhood of Ankawa overlooking the ancient Qasra hill.

The museum received permission from the Kurdistan Regional Government to begin construction in 2009 and it opened in 2015. The museum maintains and displays the cultural heritage of the Syriac people through a number of exhibits, as well as a cultural hall that contains pictures and profiles of prominent historical figures. The museum also displays a model of the Ankawa neighbourhood as it was from the 1920s to 1950s.

The collection of the museum has been digitized and can be viewed on the museum website. The manuscript collection of East Syriac manuscripts has been digitised in partnership with the Centre Numérique des Manuscrits Orientaux (CNMO).

== See also ==
- List of museums in Iraq
