= Kurdish Textile and Cultural Museum =

Art museum in Iraqi Kurdistan

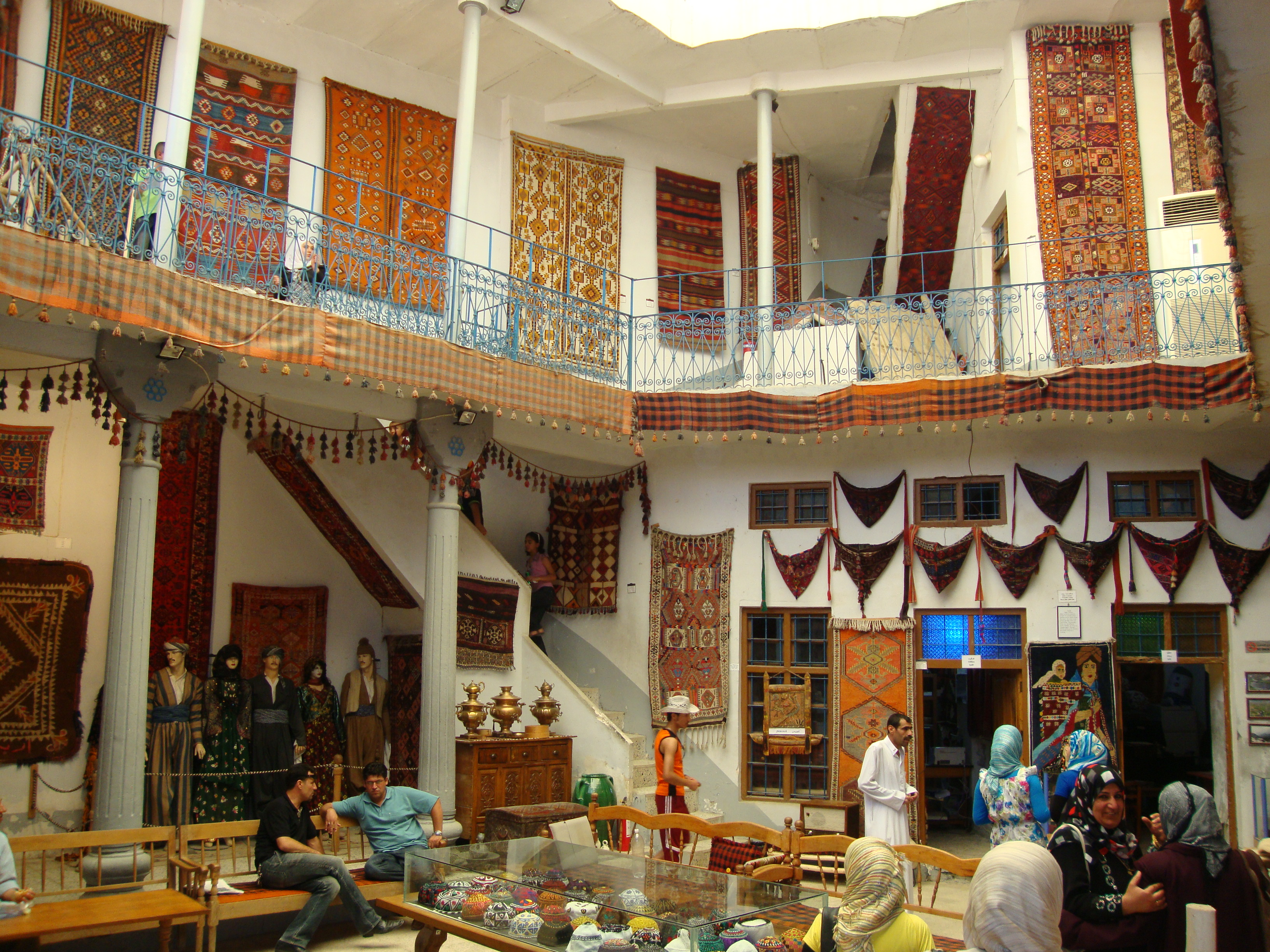
- Main hall of the Kurdish Textile and Cultural Museum

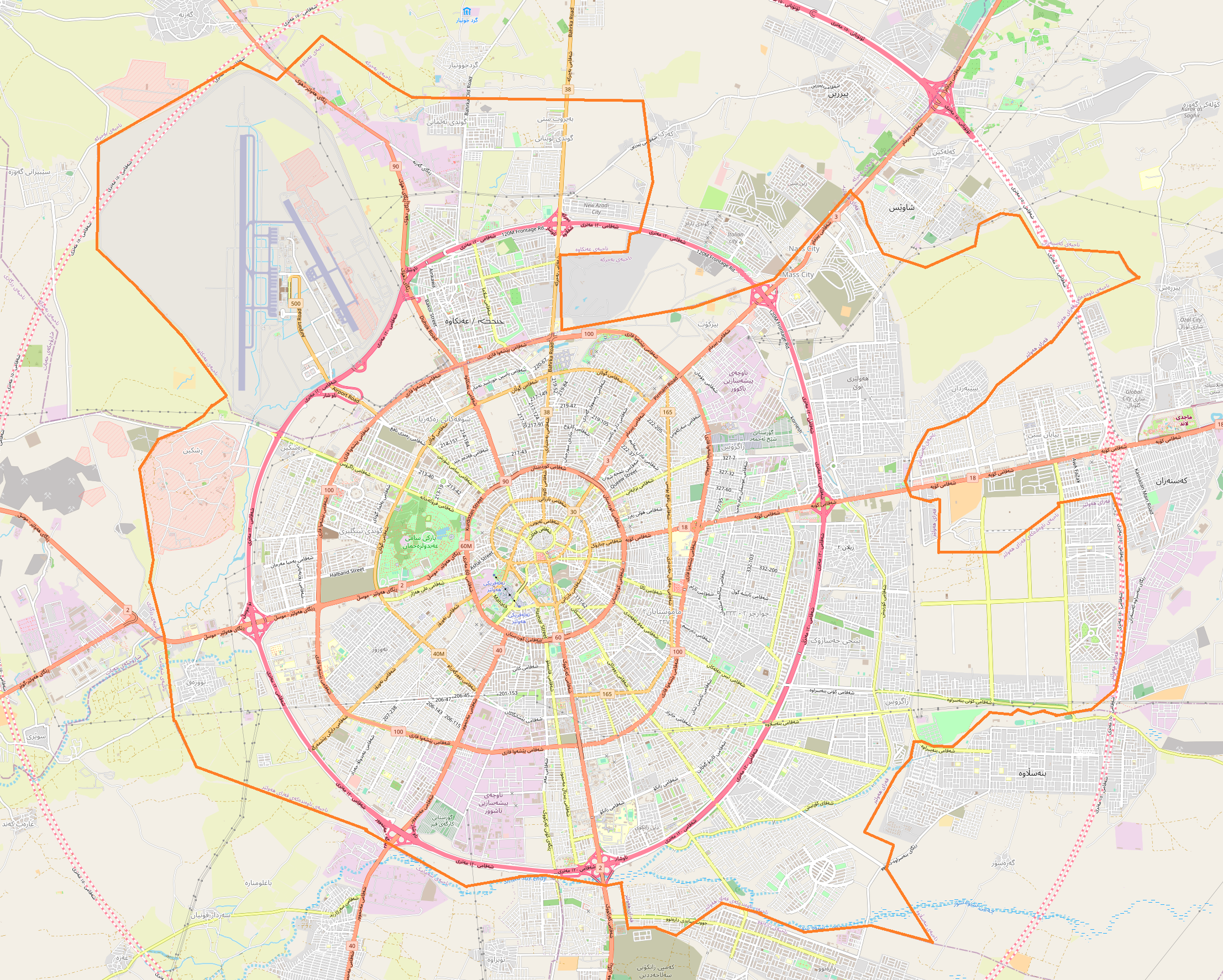
- Location of Kurdish Textile and Cultural Museum in Arbil, Kurdistan
- Established: 2004
- Location: Arbil, Iraqi Kurdistan
- Coordinates: 36.190123°N 44.009739°E
- Type: Textile
- Visitors: 56,369 (2008)

The Kurdish Textile and Cultural Museum is a museum devoted to textiles and other cultural works produced in Kurdistan, especially in Iraqi Kurdistan. It was established in 2004 and is located in a renovated mansion in the southeast quarter of the Citadel of Erbil in Iraq. The museum also works to preserve and pass down Kurdish culture and traditions, including traditional weaving methods.

== See also ==
- List of museums in Iraq
- History of the Kurds
