= Museum of Samarra =

The Museum of Samarra
- متحف سامراء
- Former name: Museum of Samarra
- Established: 2014
- Location: Samarra, Iraq
- Type: Archaeology and history museum
- Owners: Ministry of Tourism and Antiquities

The Museum of Samarra is a museum associated with the archaeological site of Samarra, an important historical city in Iraq. Samarra is located on the east bank of the Tigris River, approximately 125 kilometres north of Baghdad. The city was the capital of the Abbasid Caliphate from 836 to 892 CE and contains significant archaeological remains from the Abbasid period.

The archaeological site of Samarra includes remains of palaces, mosques, residential areas, and other structures dating principally from the 9th century. It was designated a UNESCO World Heritage Site in 2007 because of its historical and archaeological significance. The Museum of Samarra is currently under construction. It consists of three buildings built on a property of 227,700 square meters, costing 17 billion Iraqi dinars.

== Construction ==
The construction of the museum started in 2014. It consists of three buildings: the third building is an open area that includes architectural works.

== See also ==
- List of museums in Iraq
