= Tikrit Museum =

Museum in Tikrit, Iraq

The Tikrit Museum
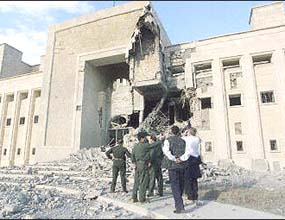
- The museum damaged by bombing
- Dissolved: 2003 Iraq War
- Location: Tikrit, Iraq.

The Tikrit Museum is a museum located in Tikrit, Iraq. It was damaged during 2003 Iraq War.

== See also ==
- List of museums in Iraq
