= Baghdadi Museum =

Coordinates: 33.3401°N 44.3895°E

- المتحف البغدادي
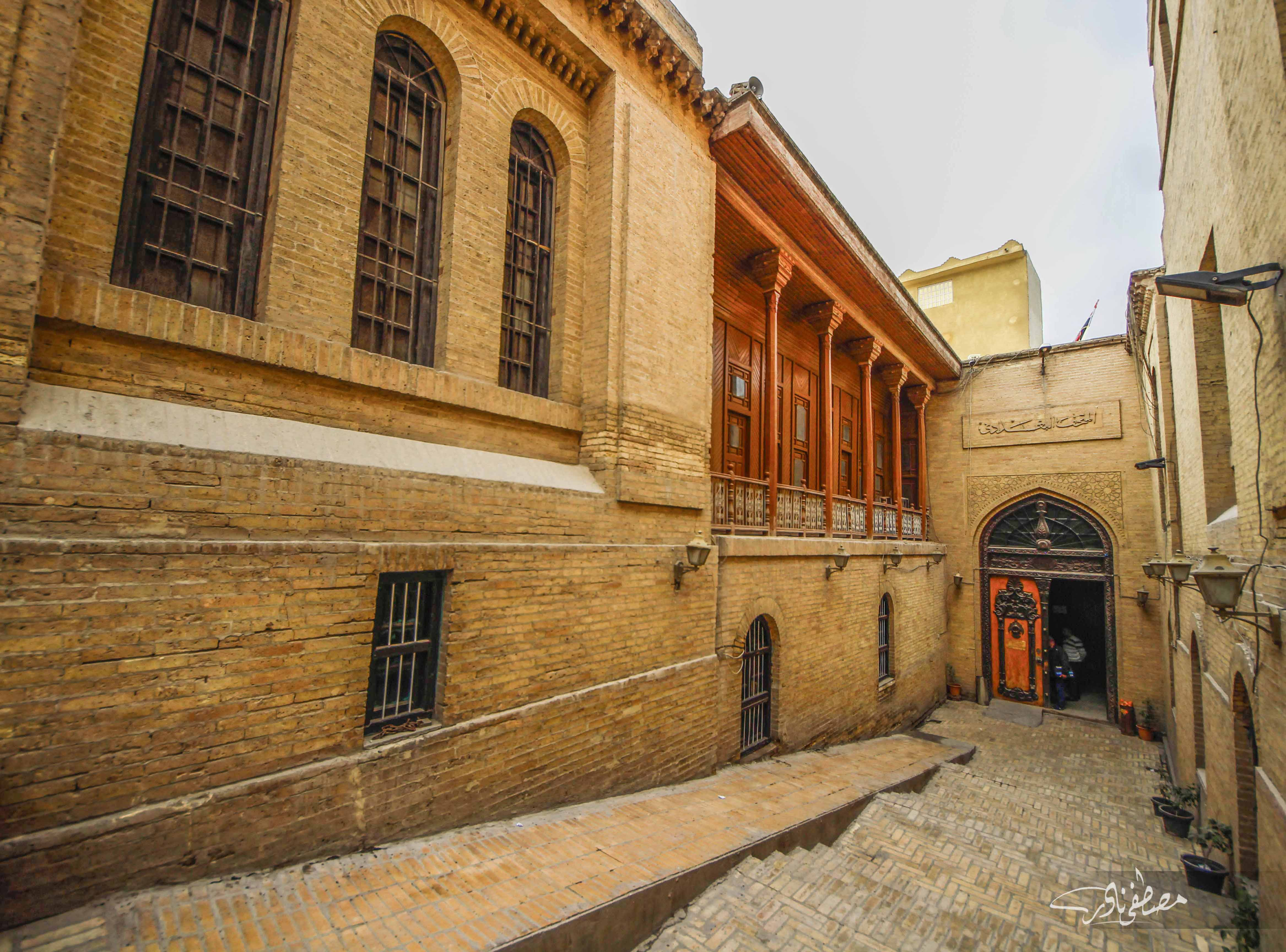
- Outside the Baghdadi museum
- Established: 1970
- Dissolved: 2003 and reopened in 2008
- Location: Baghdad, Iraq
- Type: history museum
- Collections: folk crafts, trades, professions, local customs, and street life

The Baghdadi Museum (Arabic: المتحف البغدادي) is a local history museum and a tourist landmark located in and about the capital city of Baghdad, Iraq. It was established in 1970.

The museum is situated near the River Tigris on Al-Rusafa district in one of the old buildings of the area that goes back to the year 1869. The museum suffered pillage and damage due to the American invasion during the Iraq War in 2003 causing the suspension of its operation.

== Content ==
The Museum documents a historic period of time from the history of Baghdad and conveys details from the lives of Baghdadi people from the period. As a result, the museum contains 385 statue models spread throughout 77 scenes accompanied by artistic materials, necessities, and accessories from the older periods. The scenes' aesthetic and realism restore the simplicity and cohesion of life that presents how Baghdadi families practiced their life rituals and popular traditions in the company with the tools and household items. The Museum helps preserve and shed light on the rich and social heritage along with folklore and traditional lifestyle of ancient Baghdadis so that future generations can get access to the past of Baghdad.

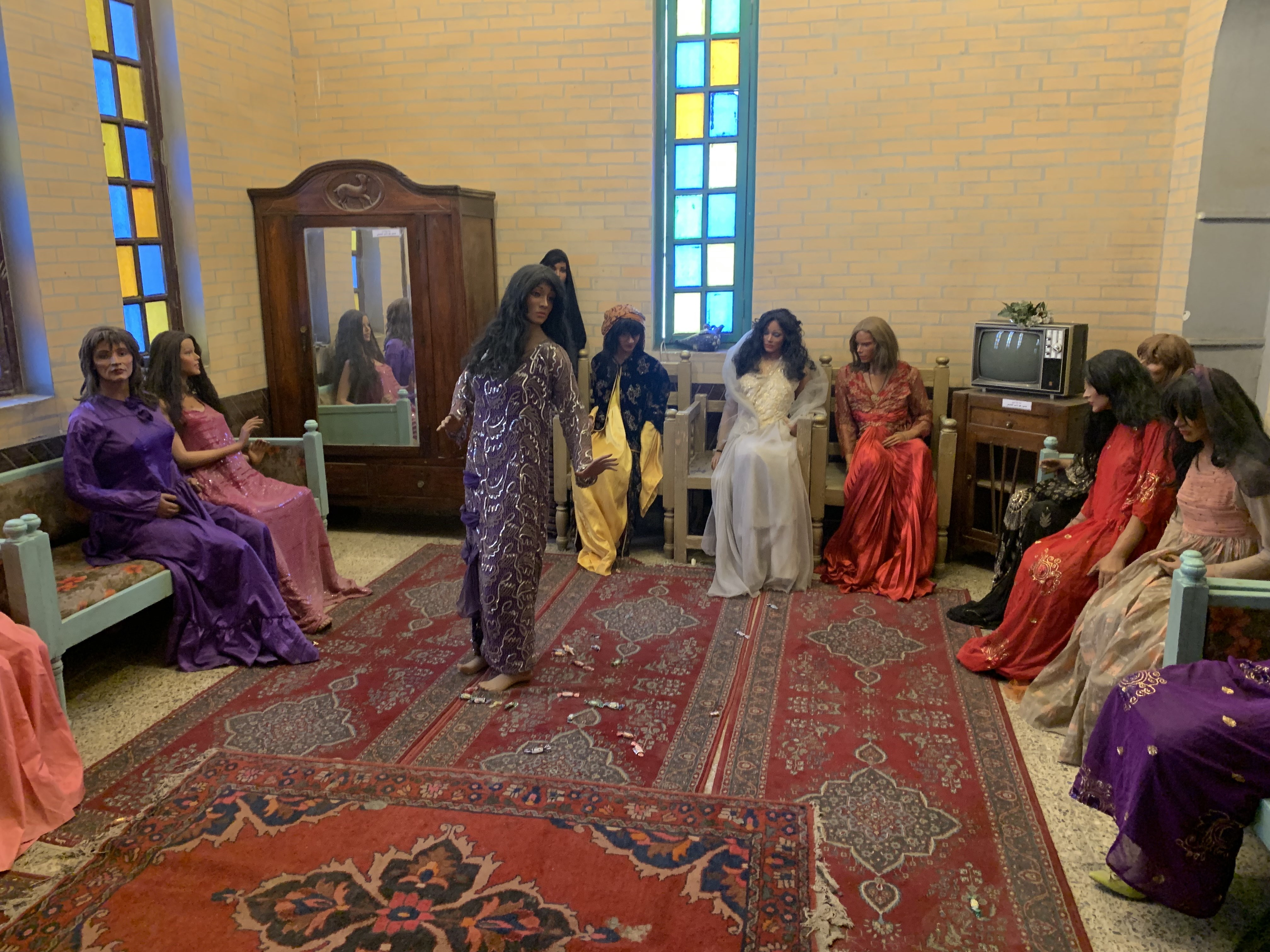
A scene from the Museum that depicts a Baghdadi Zaffa.

One scene illustrates matriarchy in an old Baghdadi household in which the character "Oum Ibrahim" admonishes her son “Ibrahim” for leaving the family household immediately after his wedding, forgetting about his mother while with his bride. It showcases mothers’ attachment to their sons which is common in many oriental societies. Another scene showcases the "Zaffa" which was an old ceremony where the bride accompanied by family and female friends, proceeds to the bride’s home and spoils her with applause, music, and dances.

The museum is housed in a building erected in 1869 under Ottoman rule, which was first used as a printing house for Baghdad Province, and it opened as a museum after renovation in 1970. During the 2003 invasion, explosions caused ceilings to collapse and windows to shatter, damaging some of the scenes. As of 2022, the museum hosts weekly Friday concerts of Iraqi maqam music, which draw young audiences.

== Gallery ==
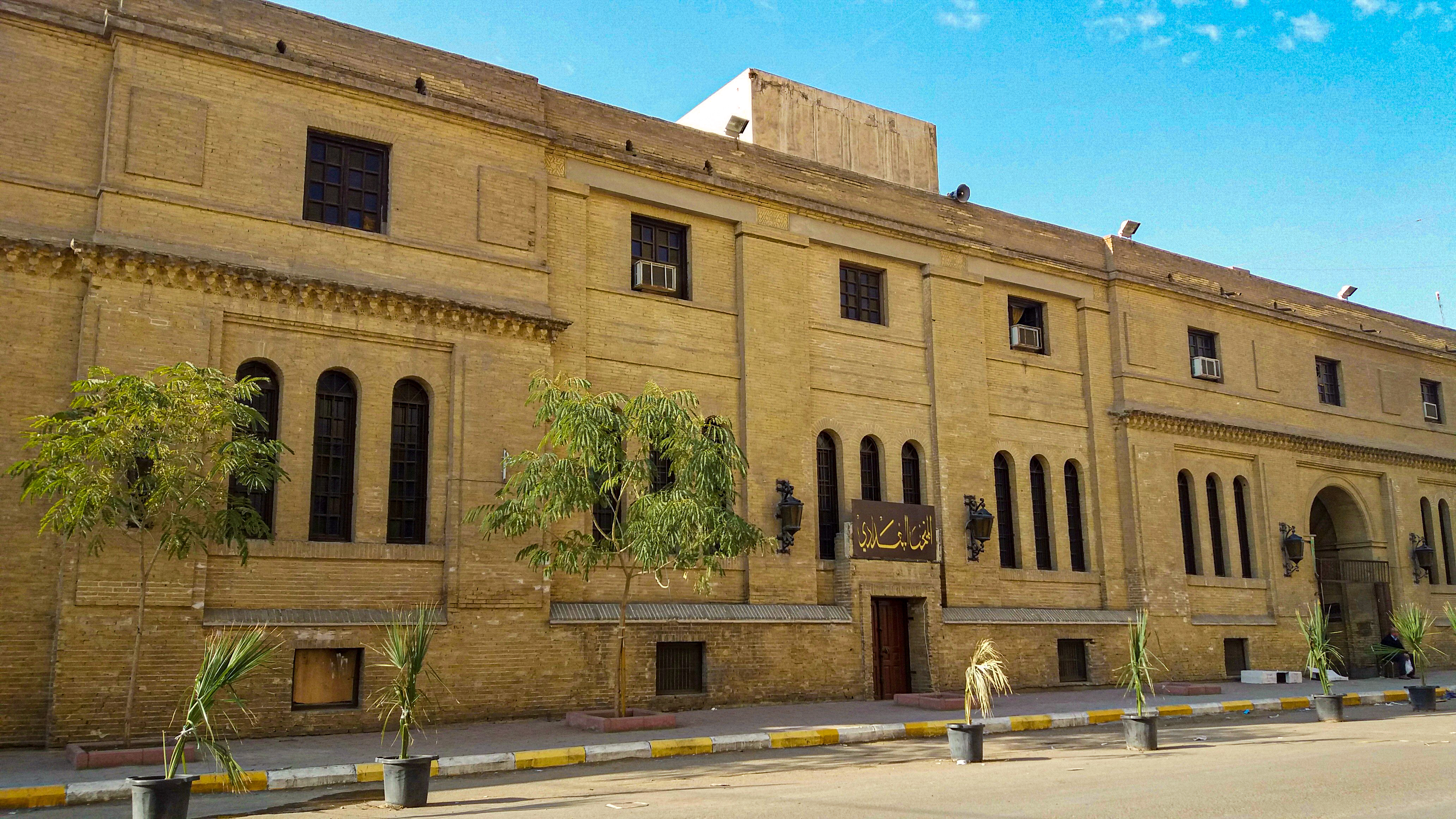
The Exterior of the Museum

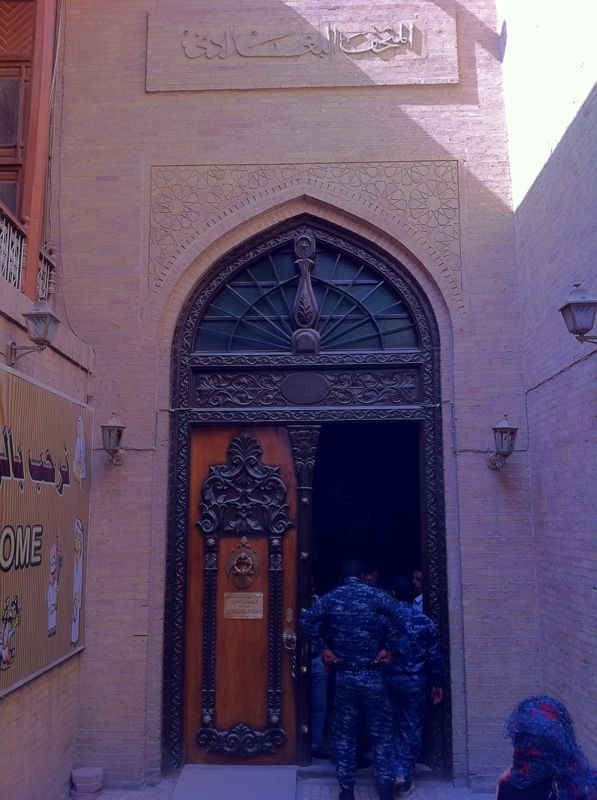
Baghdadi Museum doorway

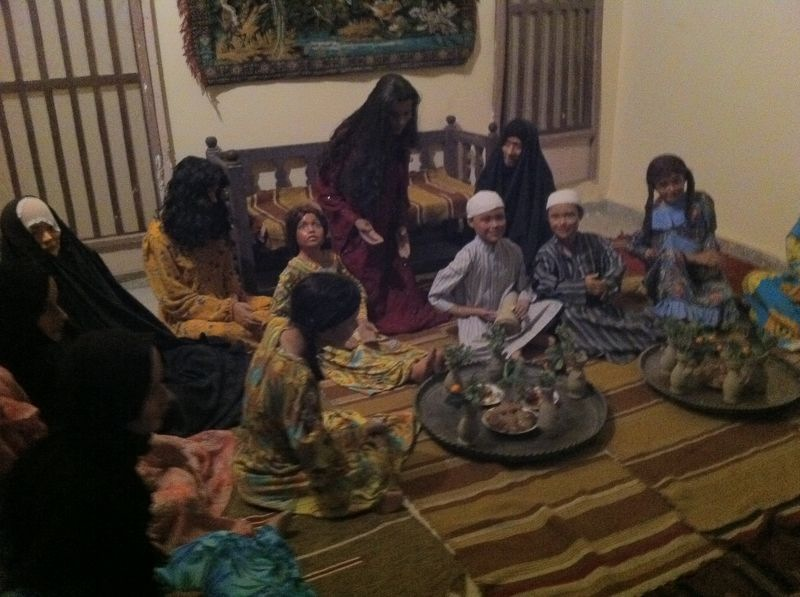
Al-Khader tray, an old Baghdadi ceremonial model

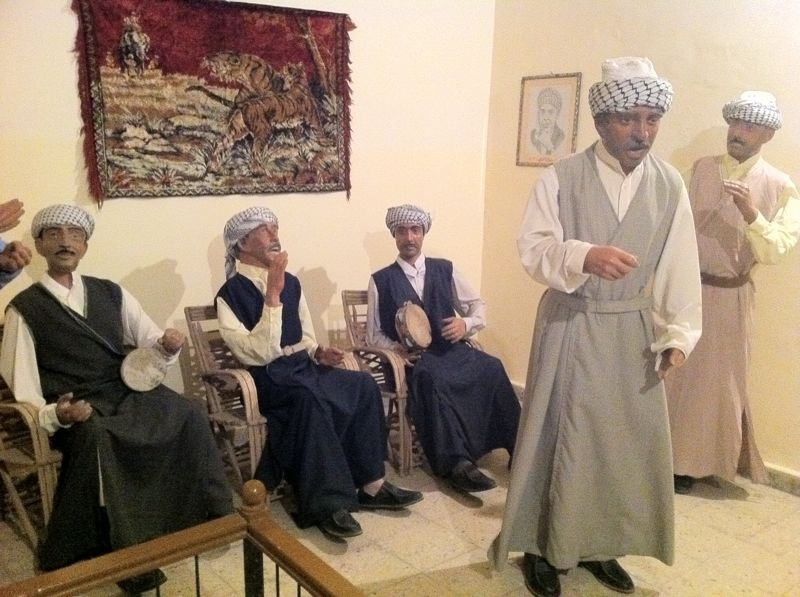
Sculptures of an Iraqi folk band

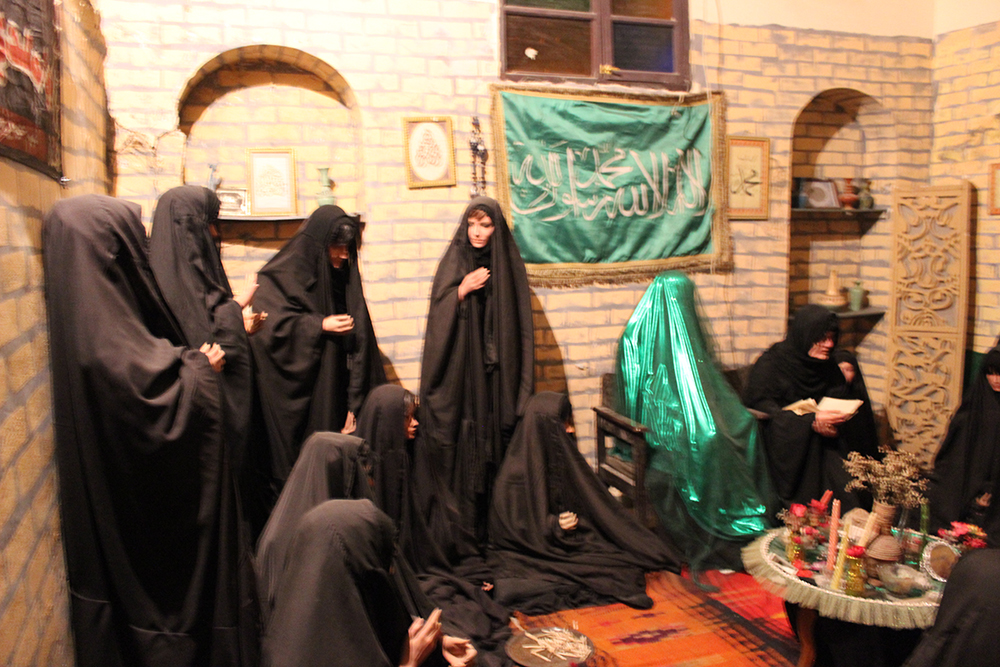
Veiled Baghdadi women

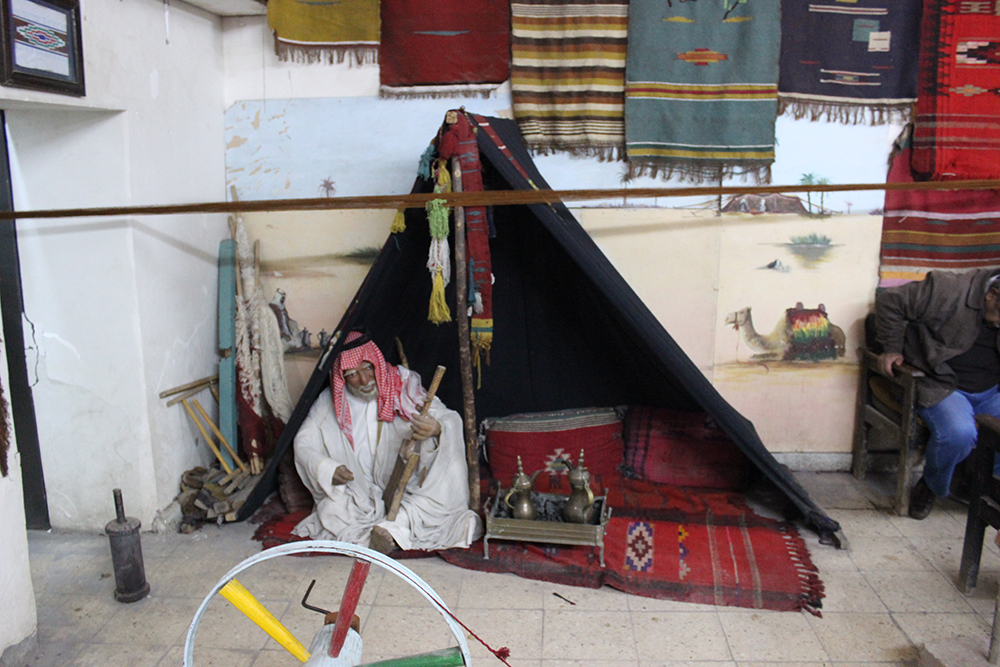
An old man in a tent

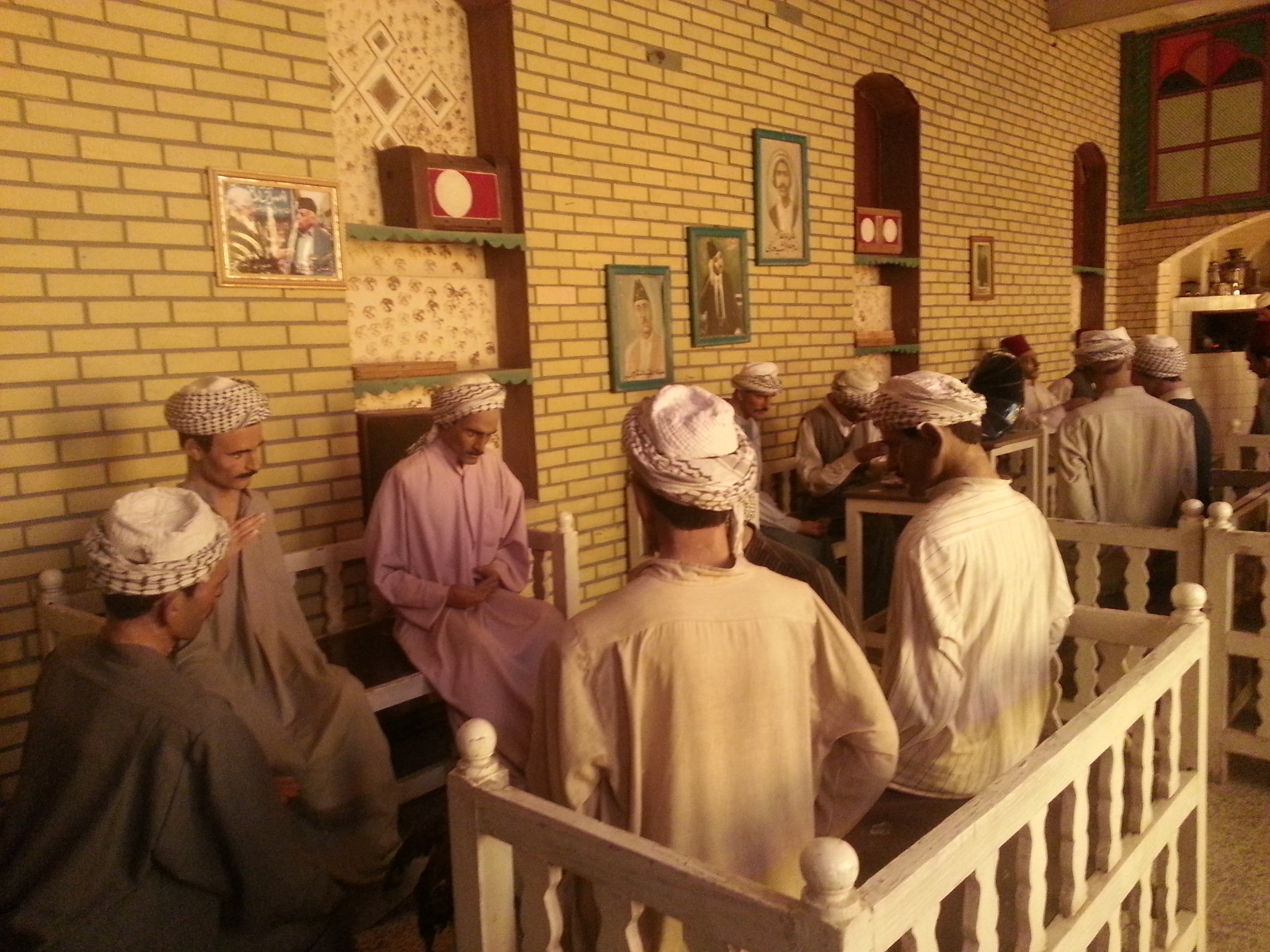
A scene from a Baghdadi Cafe

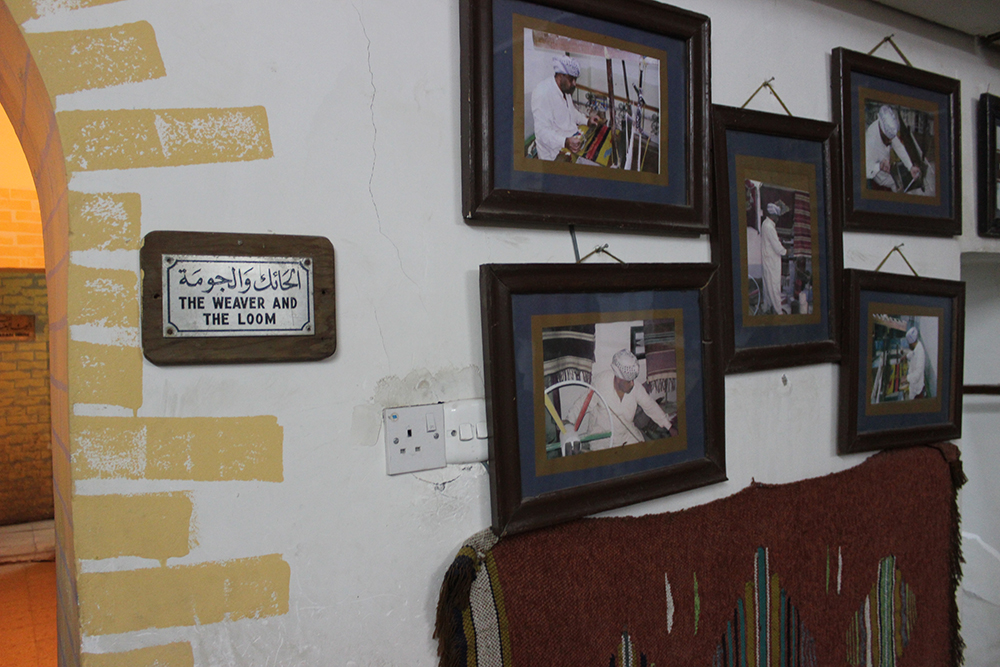
Pictures on a wall featuring a weaver

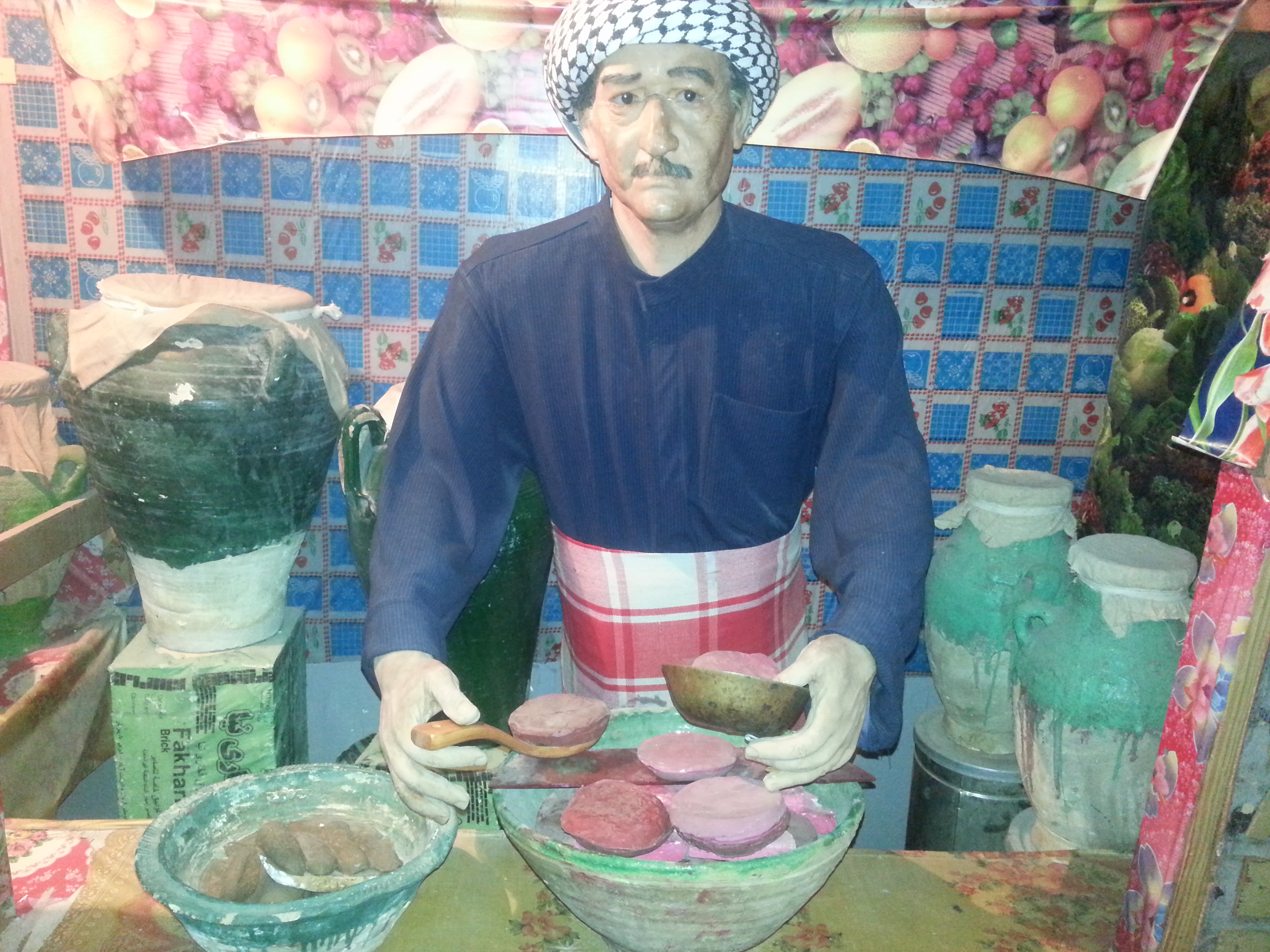
Sculpture of a meat Vendor surrounded by pots

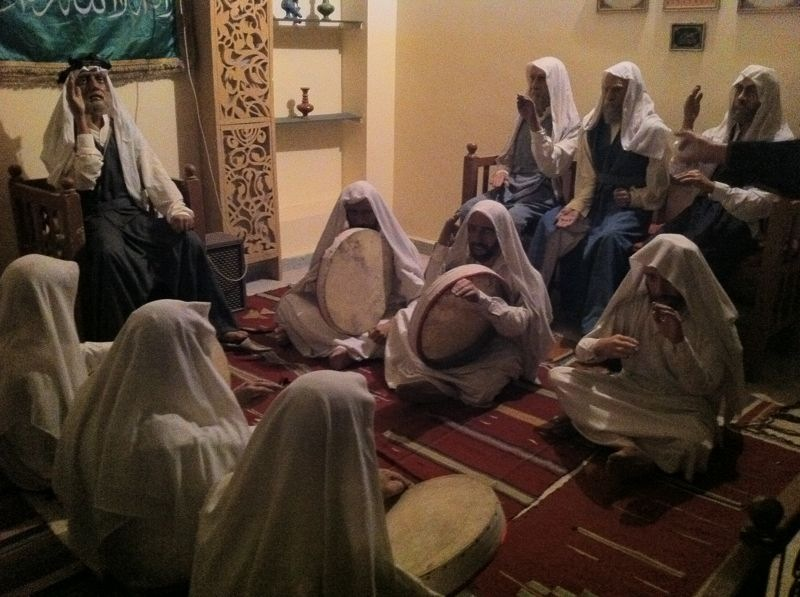
A gathering of Sufi Baghdadis, can also be a Sufi Birthday party

== See also ==
- List of museums in Iraq
