= Amna Suraka =

Former prison and current museum in Sulaimaniyya, Kurdistan Region of Iraq

- مۆزەخانەی ئەمنە سوورەكە
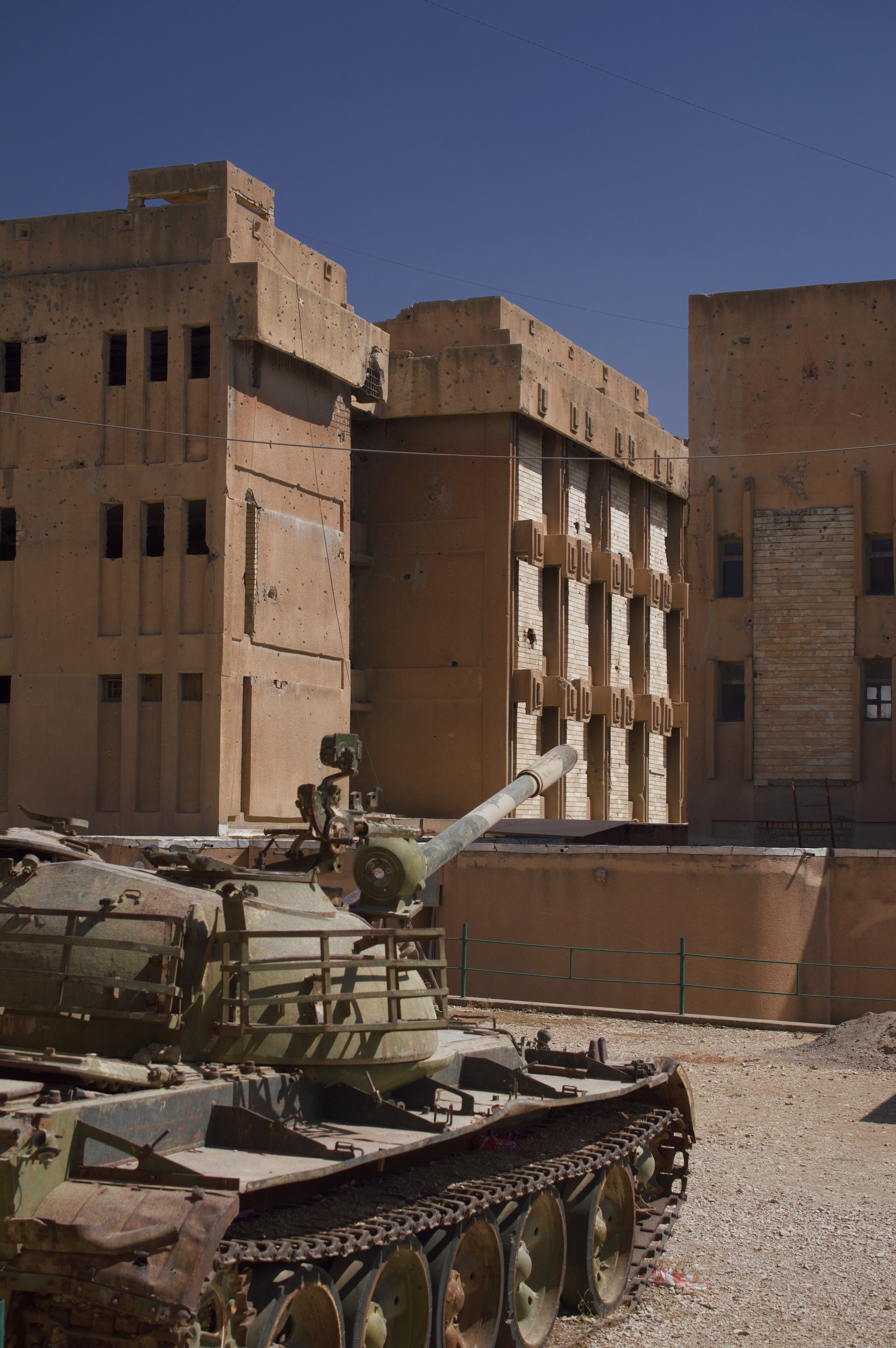
- Amna Suraka exterior. The tank is part of the museum display.

- Location in Iraq
- Former name: Directorate of General Security (Amn)
- Established: 2003
- Location: Sulaymaniyah, Kurdistan Region, Iraq
- Coordinates: 35°33′44″N 45°25′32″E
- Type: Human rights museum, Historical museum
- Key holdings: Exhibits on the Anfal campaign, Kurdish resistance, and human rights abuses under Saddam Hussein
- Collections: Artifacts, photographs, reconstructed prison cells, torture instruments, and memorials
- Visitors: Free entry, open six days a week
- Owner: Patriotic Union of Kurdistan (PUK)
- Public transit access: Accessible by local transportation in Sulaymaniyah
- Parking: Available
- Website: Official website

Amna Suraka (Arabic: آمنة سوراكا،, Kurdish: مۆزەخانەی ئەمنە سوورەكە, lit. 'Red security, red prison') is a museum in Sulaymaniyah, Kurdistan Region of Iraq.

== Prison ==
From 1979 to 1991, during Saddam Hussein's rule in Iraq, Amna Suraka was the northern headquarters of the Da'irat al-Amn/Directorate of General Security, the Iraqi Interior Ministry's intelligence agency, colloquially referred to as just Amn. Many people were imprisoned there, especially students, Kurdish nationalists, and other dissidents. Many were tortured and raped. During the 1991 Battle of Sulaymaniah Iraqi security officials and soldiers retreated to the Amn headquarters which served as the Baathist stronghold in the city and held off rebels for nearly two days until the prison was captured by Peshmerga forces, following a 2 hour long assault. Rebels summarily executed 300 Amn agents, with angry civilians killing many others. One group of mothers whose sons had been killed at the compound stoned and axed to death 21 Iraqis. In total, between 700 and 800 secret policemen and soldiers were killed, although many conscripts were pardoned and allowed to return to their homes in the south by KDP chief Massoud Barzani. The building has many bullet marks from that battle.

== Museum ==
In 2003, a museum was opened at the site for documenting the human rights abuses under Saddam's rule. The museum is free to attend, open six days a week, and mostly funded by the Patriotic Union of Kurdistan, a political party, and has also received funding from the Talabani family and the Qaiwan Group. The building was largely maintained in its damaged state to reflect the former prison, including bullet holes and the former torture and detention areas being unchanged. The museum exhibits include mannequins demonstrating how people were tortured in the prison and a hall of broken mirrors with 182,000 shards commemorating Kurds killed during the genocidal Anfal campaign, with 4,500 backlights to represent the Kurdish villages destroyed during the campaign. There is also another exhibition on Anfal, with pictures of exhumed bodies and the names of prominent Kurds who were killed or disappeared. A later exhibit is on Peshmerga fighters killed by ISIS.

At the museum, the history of human rights abuses is used in a narrative of Kurdish nationalism. According to Autumn Cockrell-Abdullah, the museum attempts to "constitute the Kurds as a nation and nation-state and to demarcate the boundaries of a Kurdish national identity" by memorializing human rights abuses against Kurds.

In 2013, Vice News reporter Orlando Crowcroft called Amna Suraka "the world's most depressing museum", as well as the biggest tourist attraction in Sulaimaniyya.

The museum hosted Hiwa K's 2007 Moon Calendar contemporary art performance and has hosted exhibitions from local artists such as Sakar Sleman.

Museum exhibits
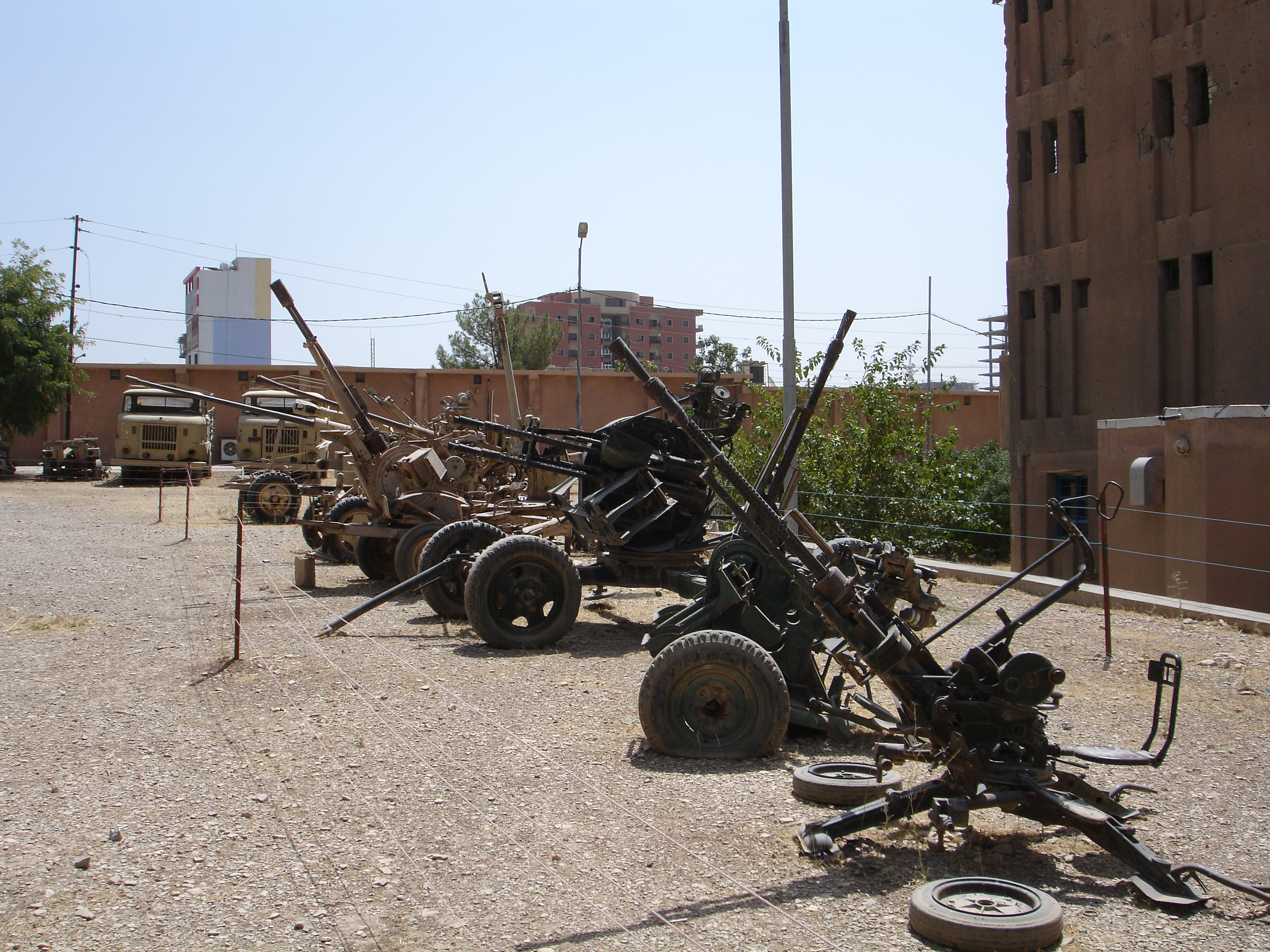
Artillery pieces on display outside

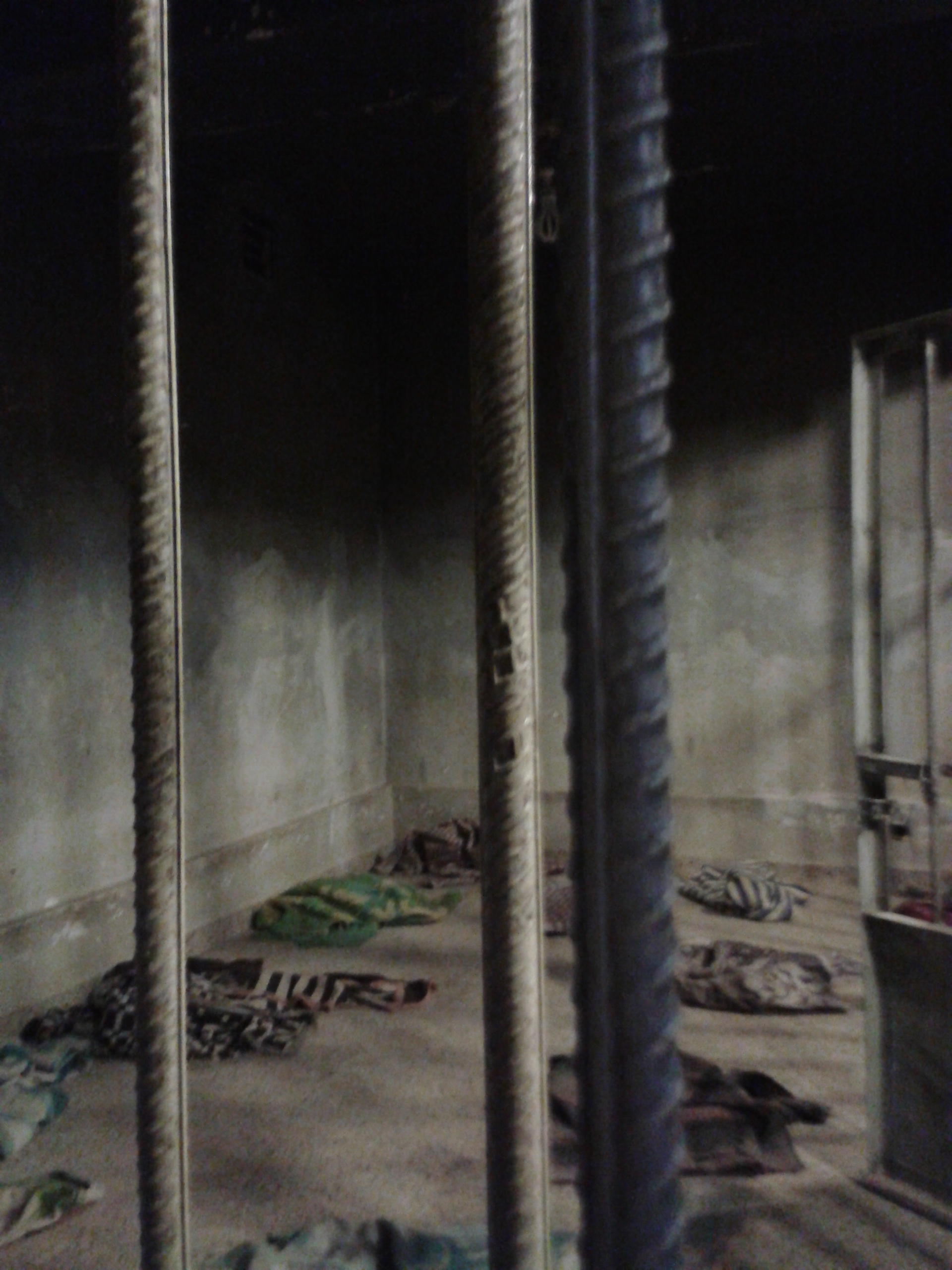
Reconstructed prison cell

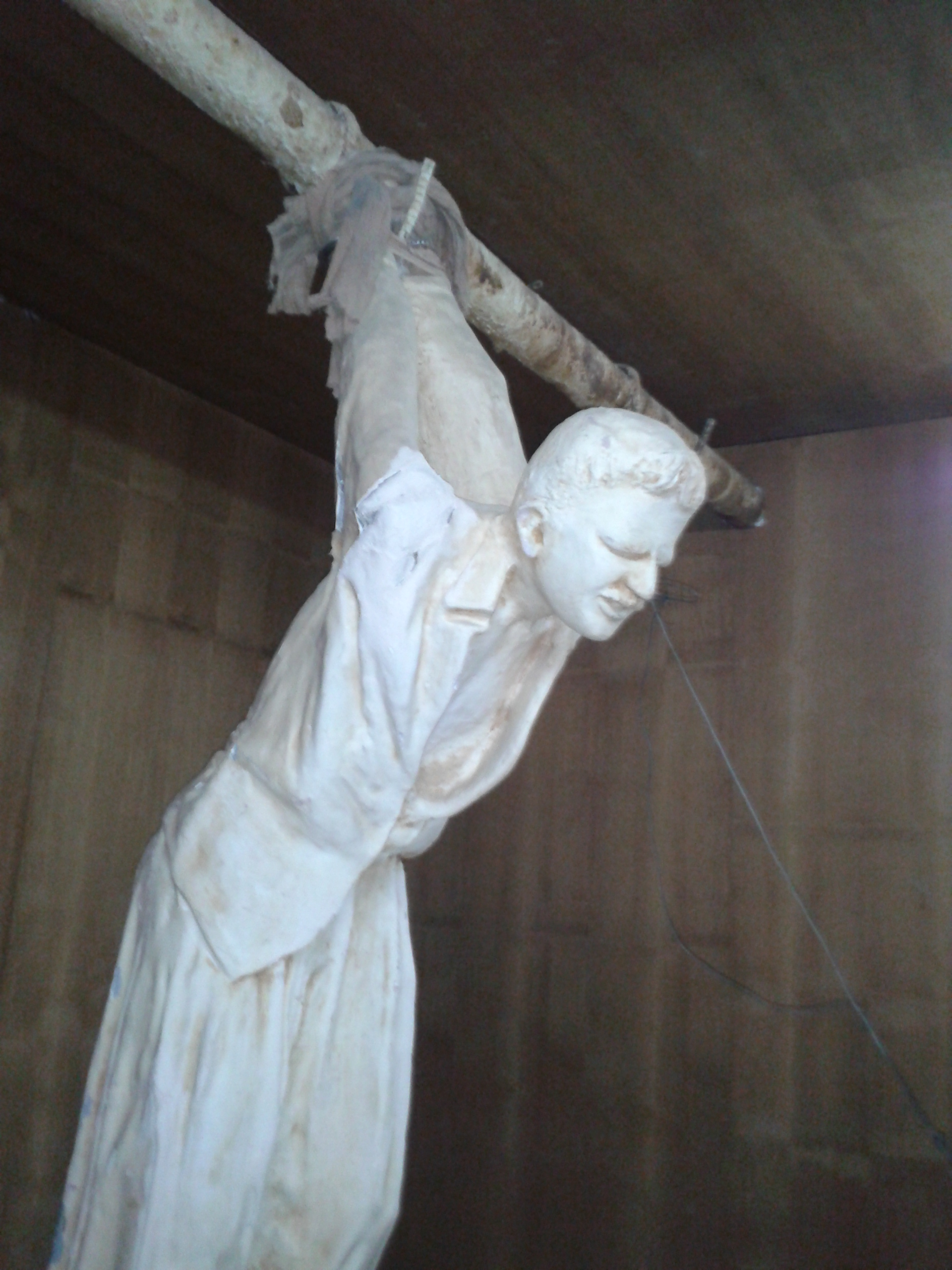
Torturing detainees with electricity and hanging

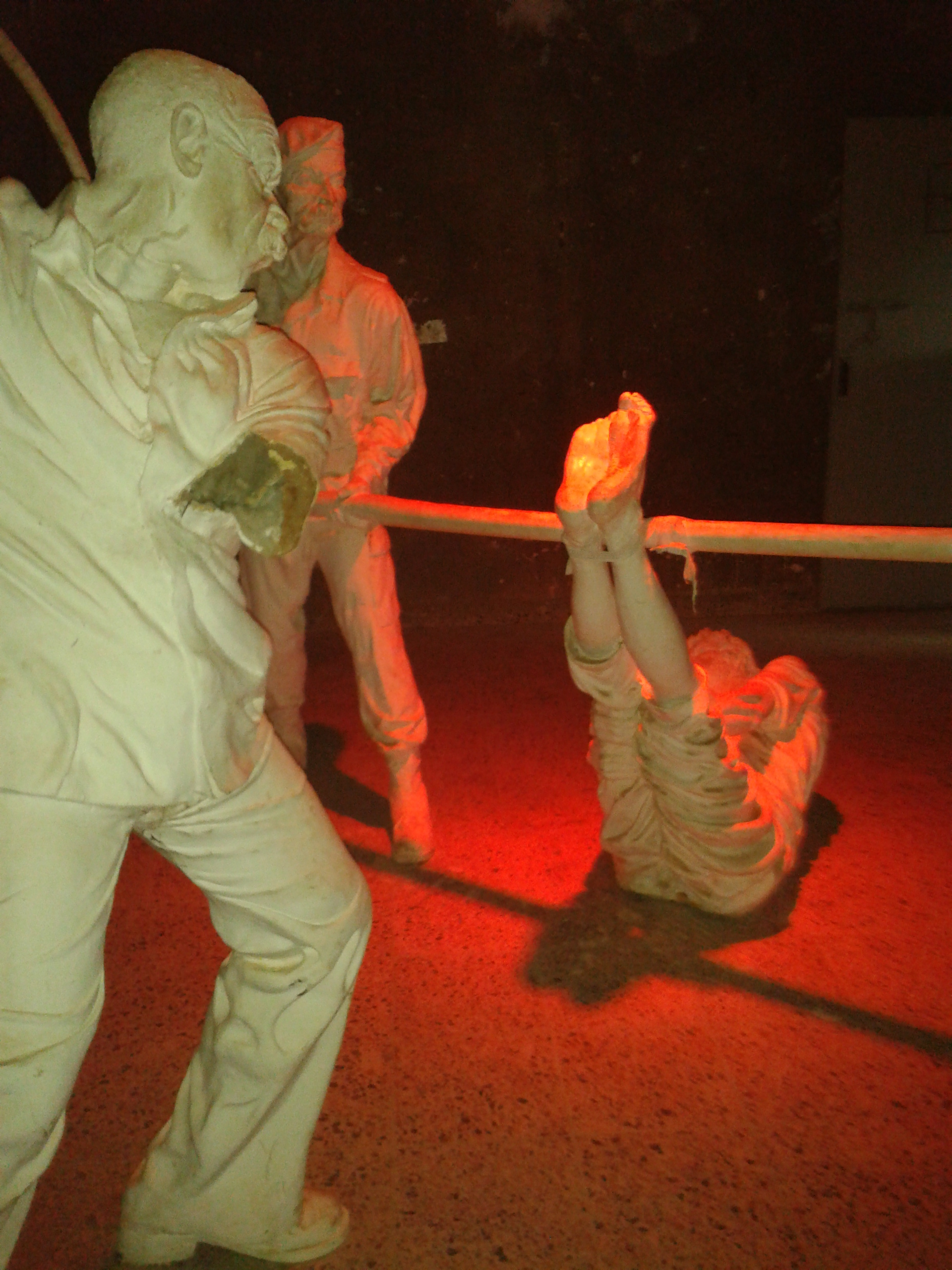
Torture of a prisoner by falanga

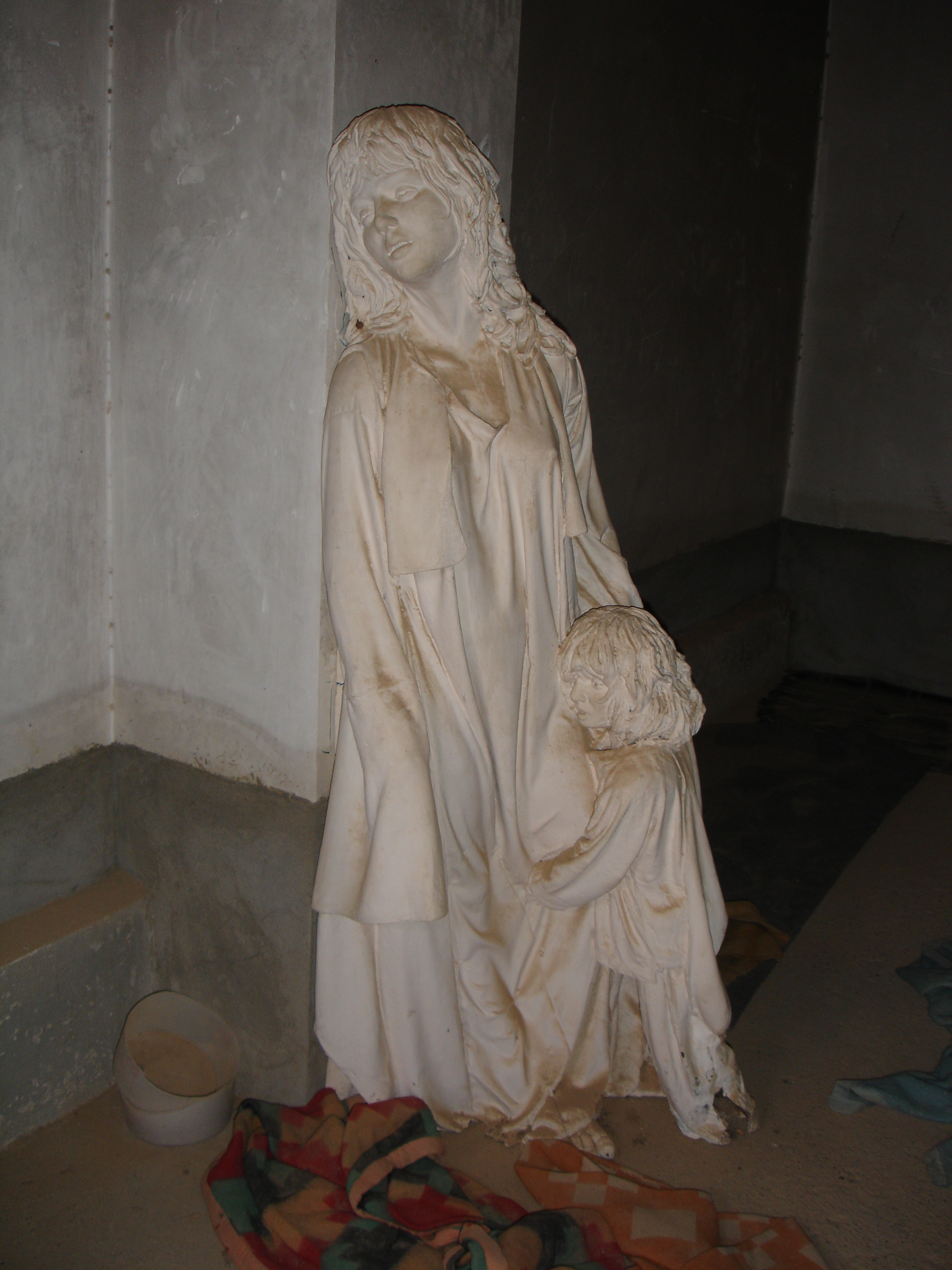
Representation of a female prisoner who was raped until she gave birth to a child

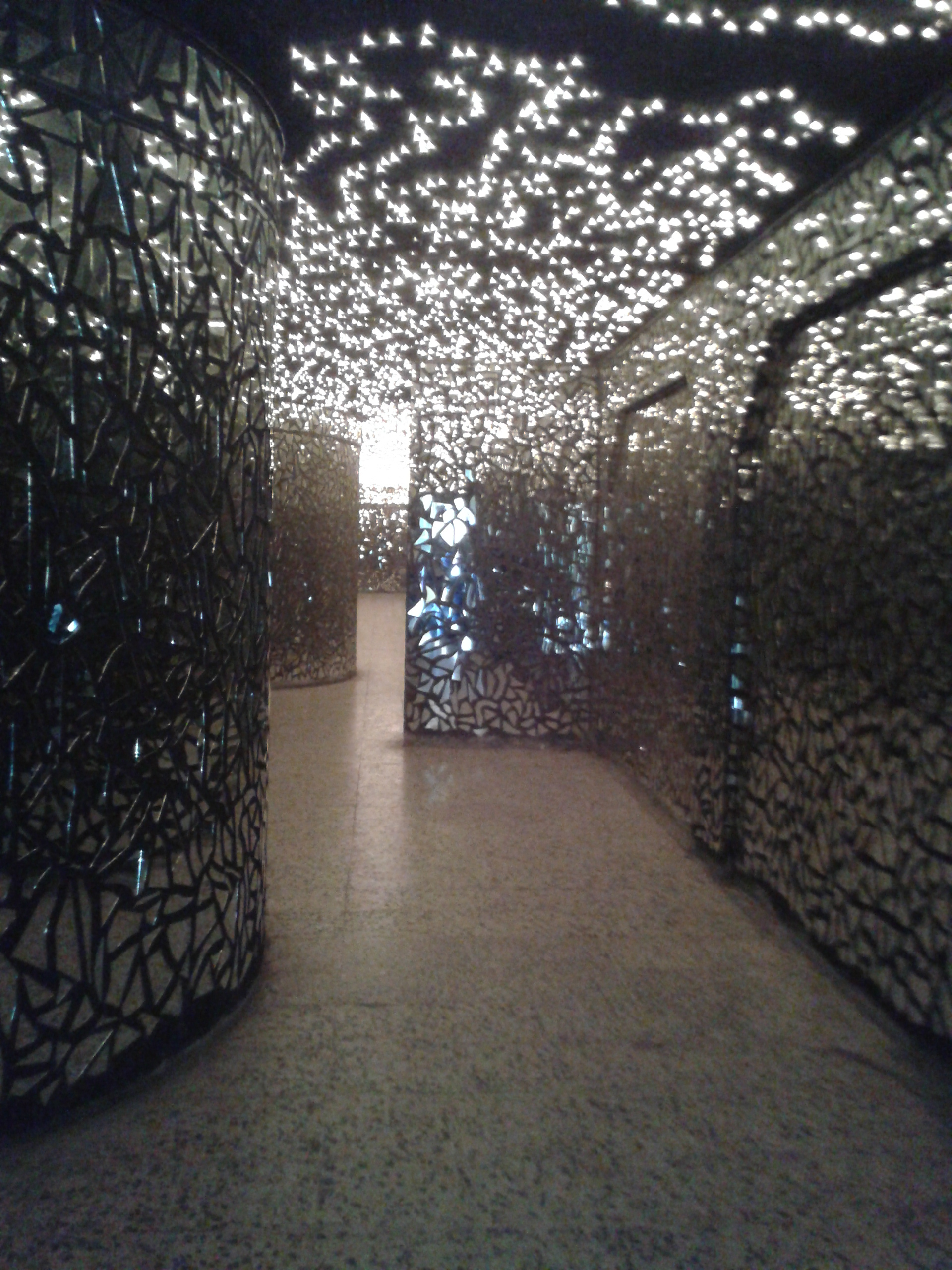
Hall of mirrors

== See also ==
- List of museums in Iraq
