= Kurd's Heritage Museum =

Coordinates: 35.556332°N 45.440160°E

- مۆزەخانەی کەلەپووری کورد
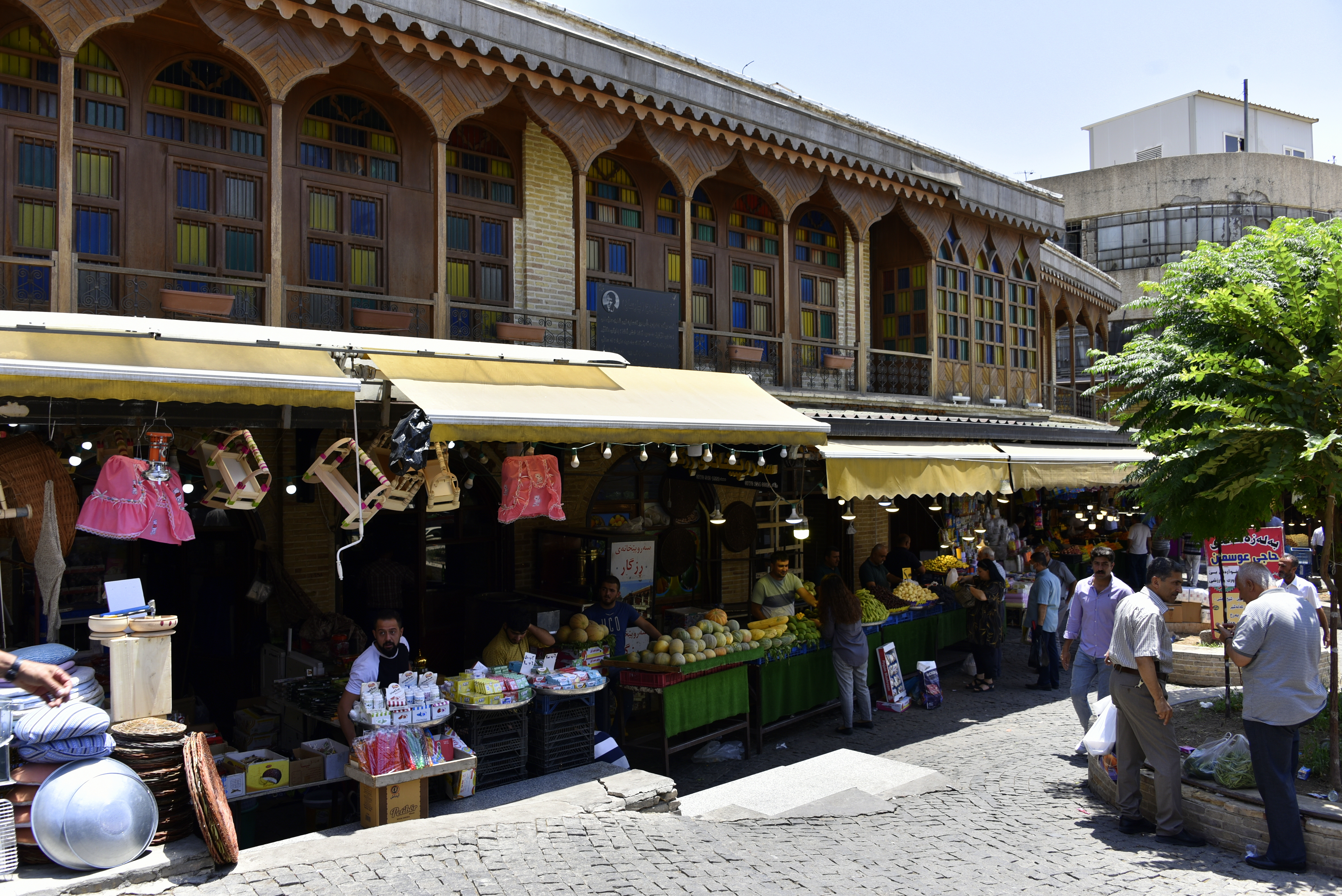
- The Kurd's Heritage Museum, occupying the upper floor of Farah Hotel, June 2021
- Established: November 14, 2015
- Location: Sulaymaniyah, Saboon Karan District, Sulaymaniyah Governorate, Kurdistan Region, Iraq
- Type: History museum
- Collection size: 1718 artifacts
- Founders: Erfan Othman Ahmad and Barzan Qadir Khalooz
- Director: Erfan Othman Ahmed
- Owner: Revival of Kurd’s Heritage Organisation
- Website: www.kurdheritage.com/english.aspx

The Kurd's Heritage Museum (Kurdish: مۆزەخانەی کەلەپووری کورد; Arabic: متحف التراث الكردي), is a history museum located within the heart of Mawlawi Street of the downtown of Sulaymaniyah in the Kurdistan Region of Iraq. The museum is owned by the Revival of Kurd's Heritage Organisation (Kurdish: ڕێکخراوی بوژاندنەوەی کەلەپوری کورد) but administratively, the museum is affiliated with the Sulaymaniyah Directorate of Antiquities and the Sulaymaniyah Museum.

== Foundation and History ==
Erfan Othman (heritage expert) and his friend artist Barzan Qadir started to collect a multitude of traditional Kurdish objects in 2000 with the intention of preserving and protecting such Kurdish relics through self-funding; no funding from any source was given. Their collection started to increase year after year through purchases, donations, and bequeathment. The Regional Government of Iraqi Kurdistan granted them permission and license to establish their organization (the Revival of Kurd's Heritage Organisation). Farah Hotel is the oldest hotel in the city of Sulaymaniyah and lies in the core of the historical Mawlawi Street, and was opened in the early 1920s. The hotel was abandoned during the last 4 decades. The Directorate of Antiquities of Sulaymaniyah purchased the hotel in 2006 and carried out an extensive restoration and renovation plan in 2013. The process was finished in 2015. The upper (or 1st floor) was given to the Revival of Kurd's Heritage Organisation to display its collection by creating a history museum there. The Kurd's Heritage Museum was officially opened on November 14, 2015 (the same day as Sulaymaniyah Foundation Day).

== The Museum's Collection ==
The museum has 1718 registered items that encompass a variety of objects (clothes, jewelry, books, manuscripts, household furniture and utensils, firearms, rugs, etc.) ranging from 50 t0 400 years old. Around 200 only are on display. The rest are in storage. The bulk of the objects came from the city of Sulaymaniyah or its surroundings. One of the unique characteristics of the museum's content is the so-called Jewish Collection. Around 25 objects were owned by Jewish people living in Sulaymaniyah before their immigration to Israel, including 3 rare Torahs and some parts of a Mizrahi Torah. This number does not include a large number of objects made by Jewish craftsmanship.

== Opening Hours ==
The Museum is open from Saturday to Thursday, 9:00 AM to 1:00 PM. Entry is free. The museum was temporarily closed to the public during the COVID-19 crisis in March and April 2020.

== Gallery ==
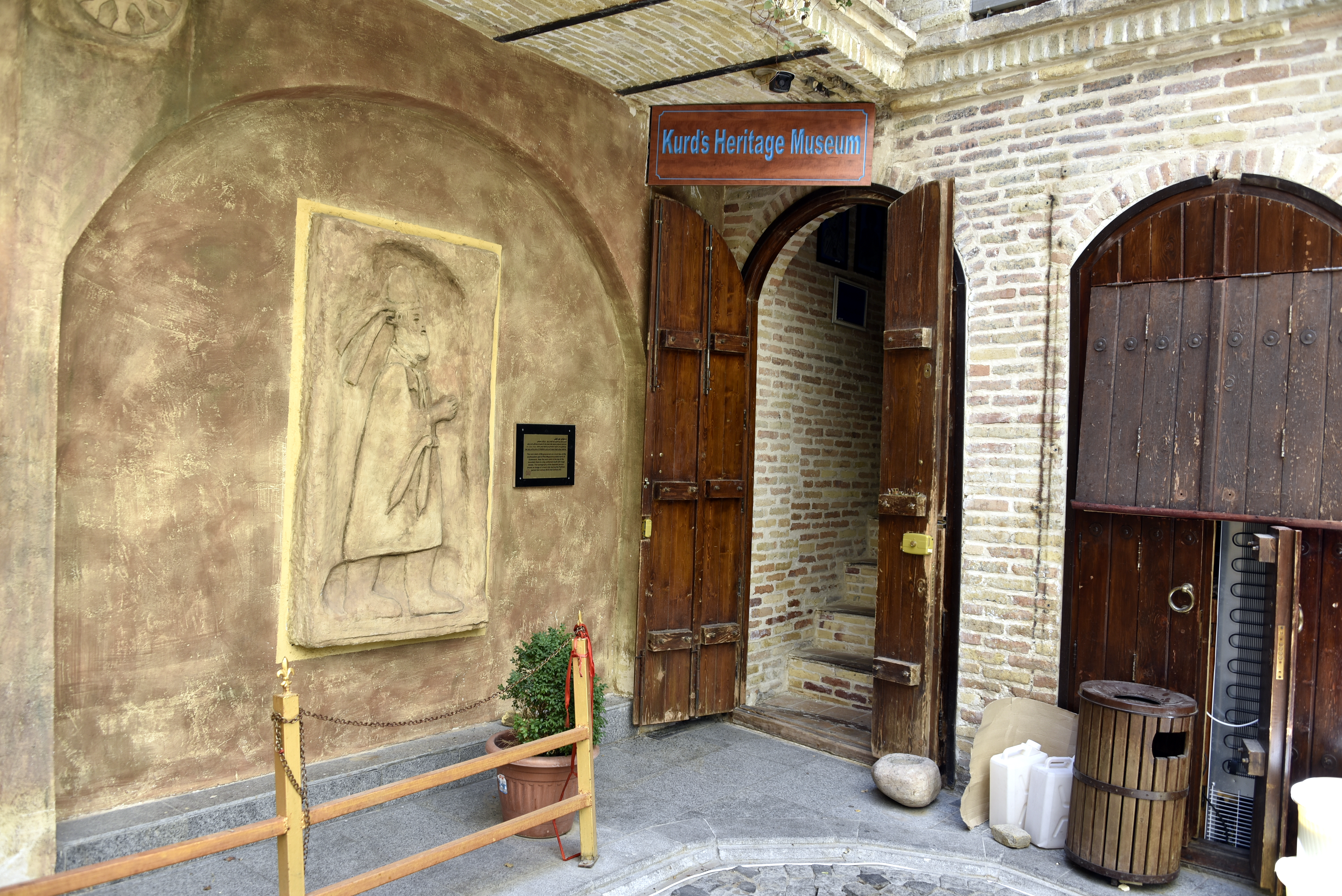
Entrance to the Kurd's Heritage Museum within the inner courtyard of Farah Hotel

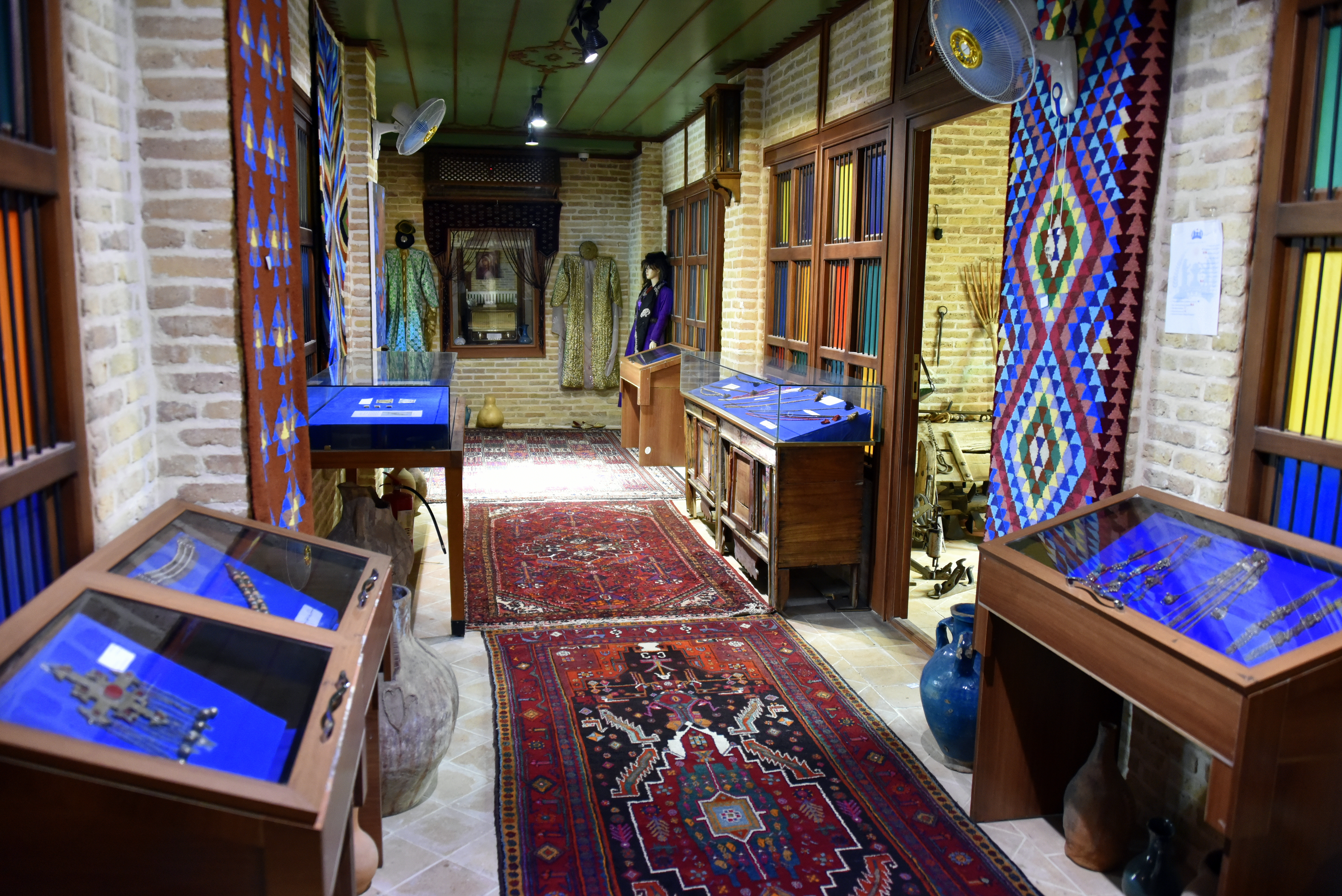
Interior of the museum

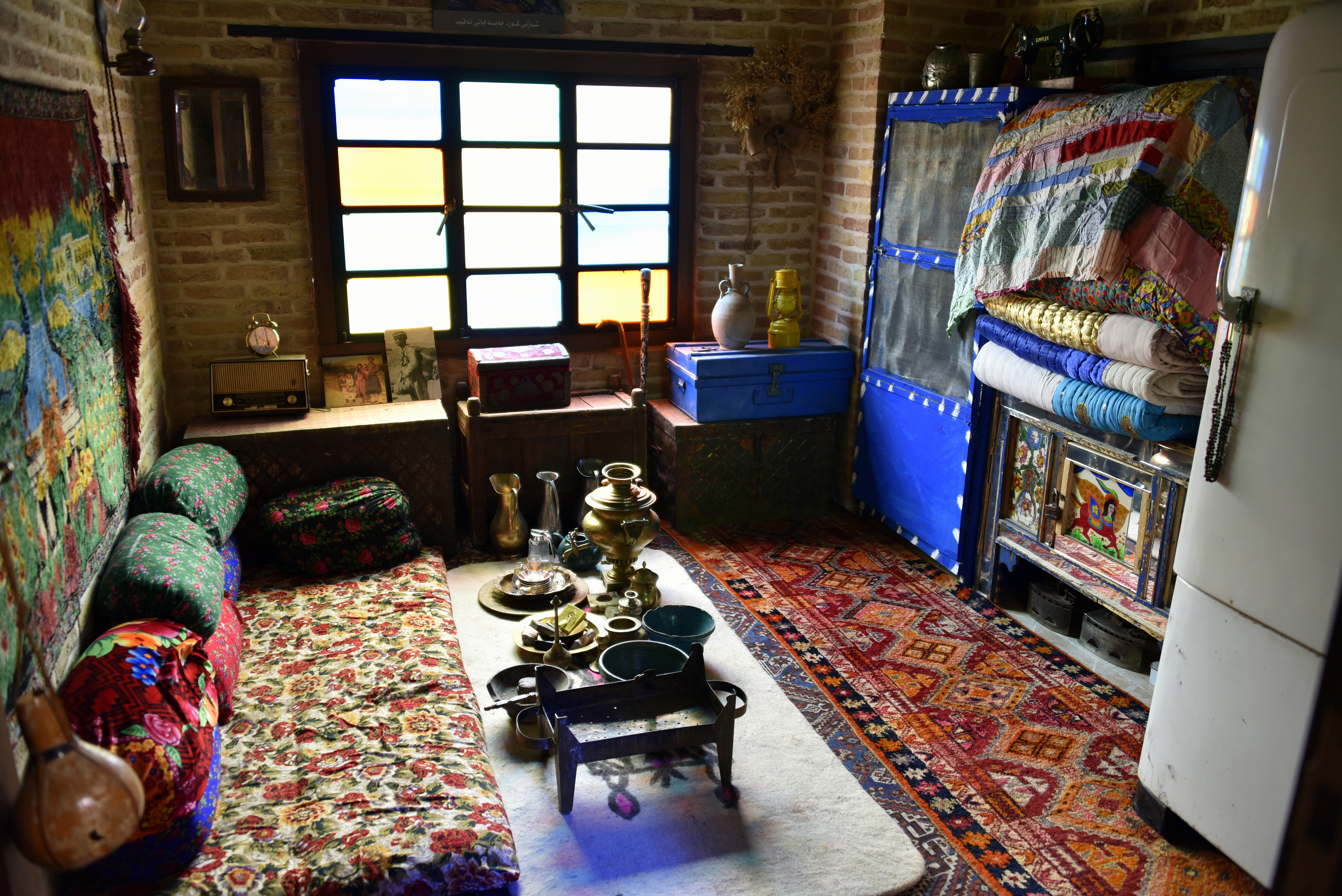
A typical traditional Kurdish (of Sulaymaniyah houses) living room's content and arrangement

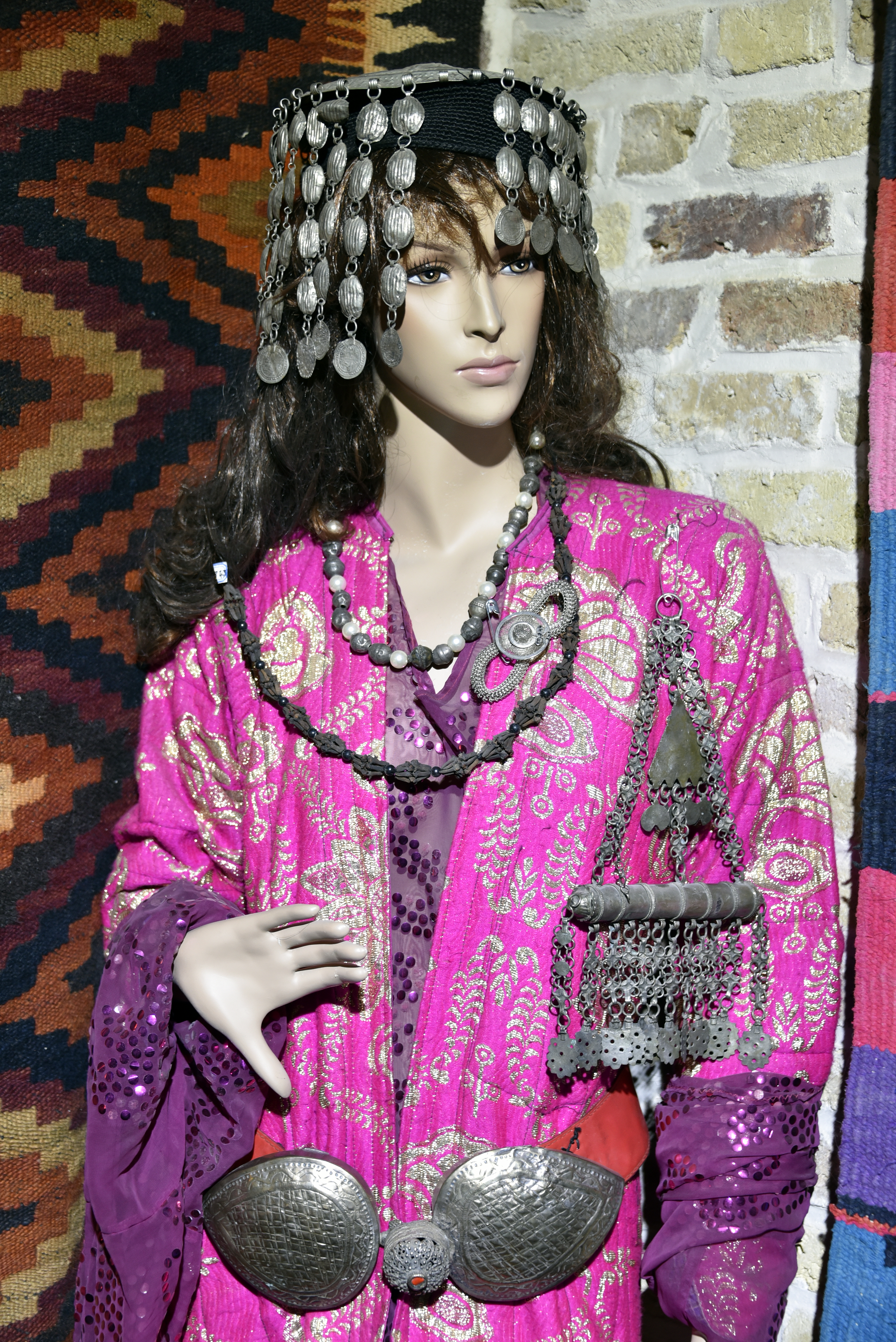
Traditional Kurdish attire and a multitude of accessories. The dress and silver accessories were made by Jewish craftsmanship in Sulaymaniyah, 100 years ago

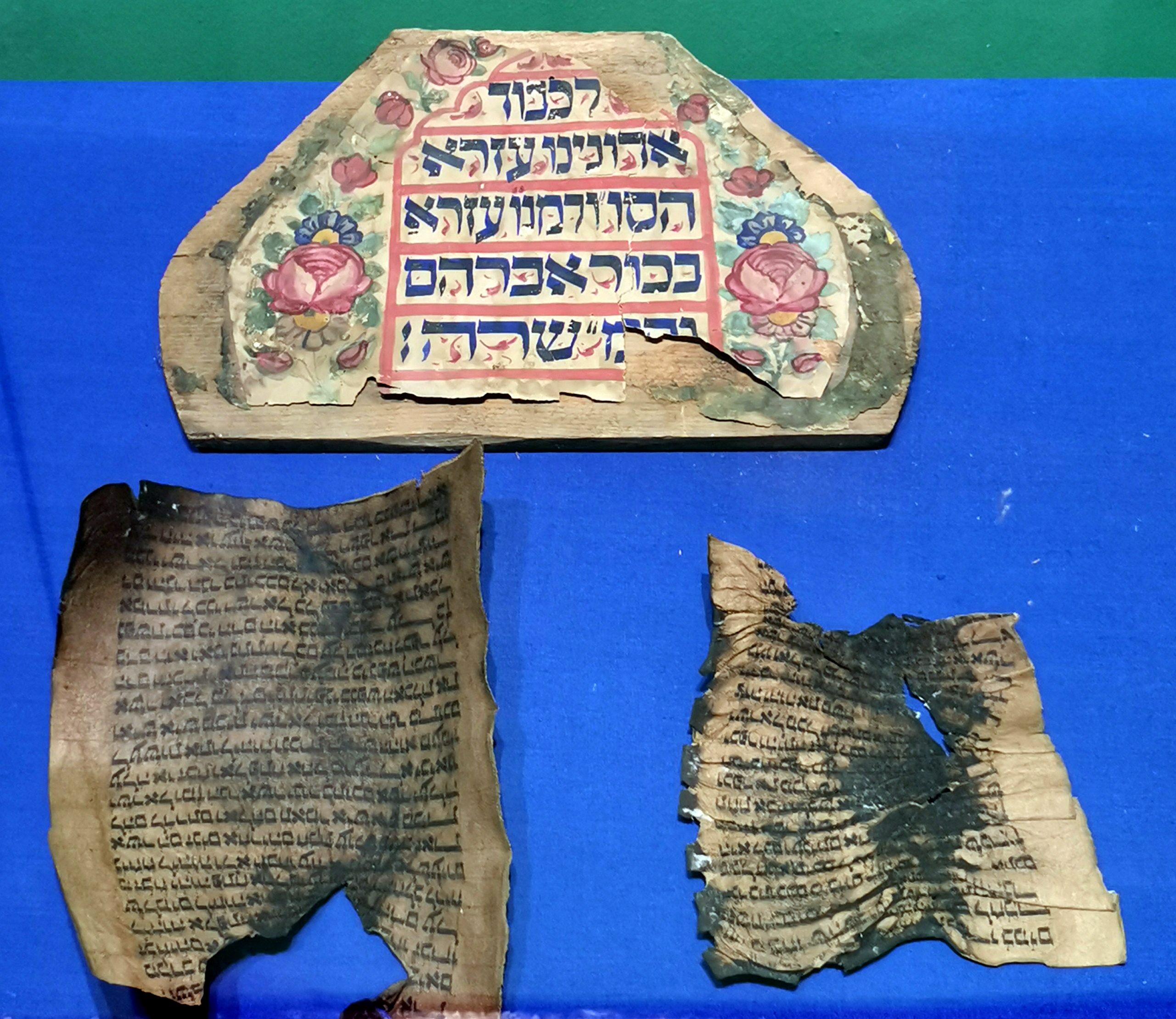
Parts of Iraqi Mizrahi Torah. The upper object is the donor's inscription

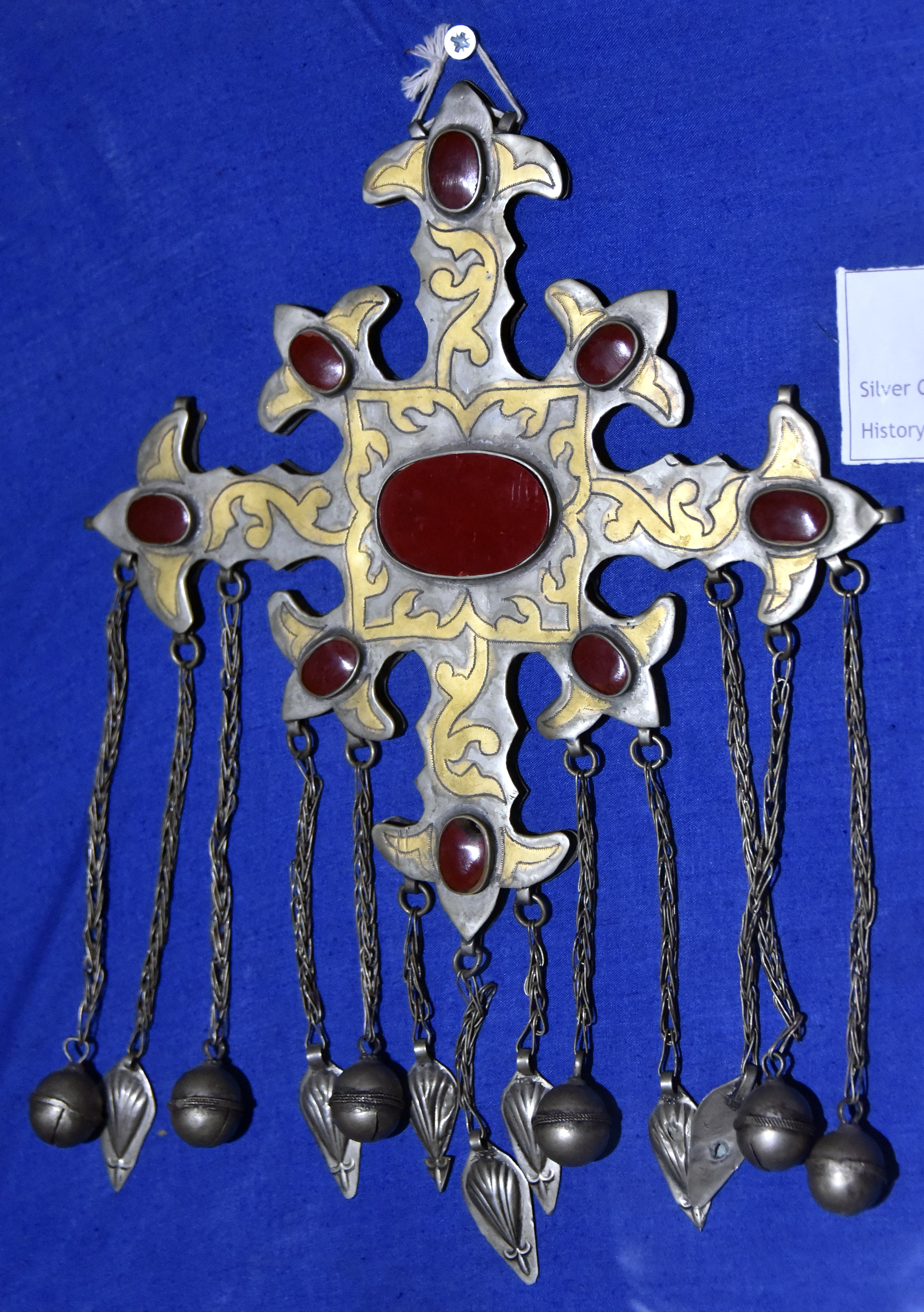
Jewelry wore by Christian people in Sulaymaniyah. Made in the early 18th century CE. Silver and precious stones

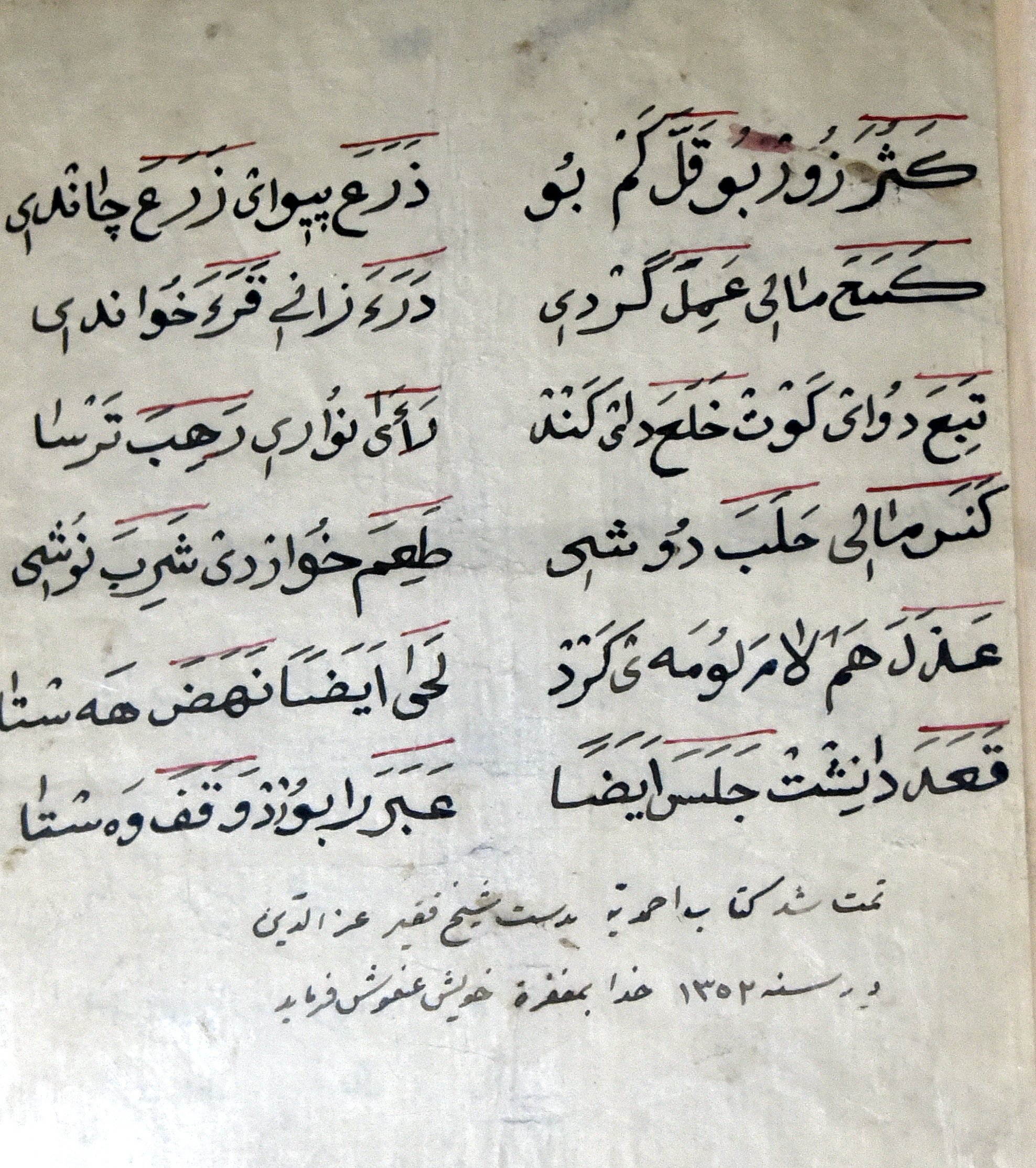
Page written in Kurdish Sorani dialect with corresponding Arabic words. Kak Ahmadi Sheikh's Book, for learning Arabic and Kurdish languages. 1352 AD

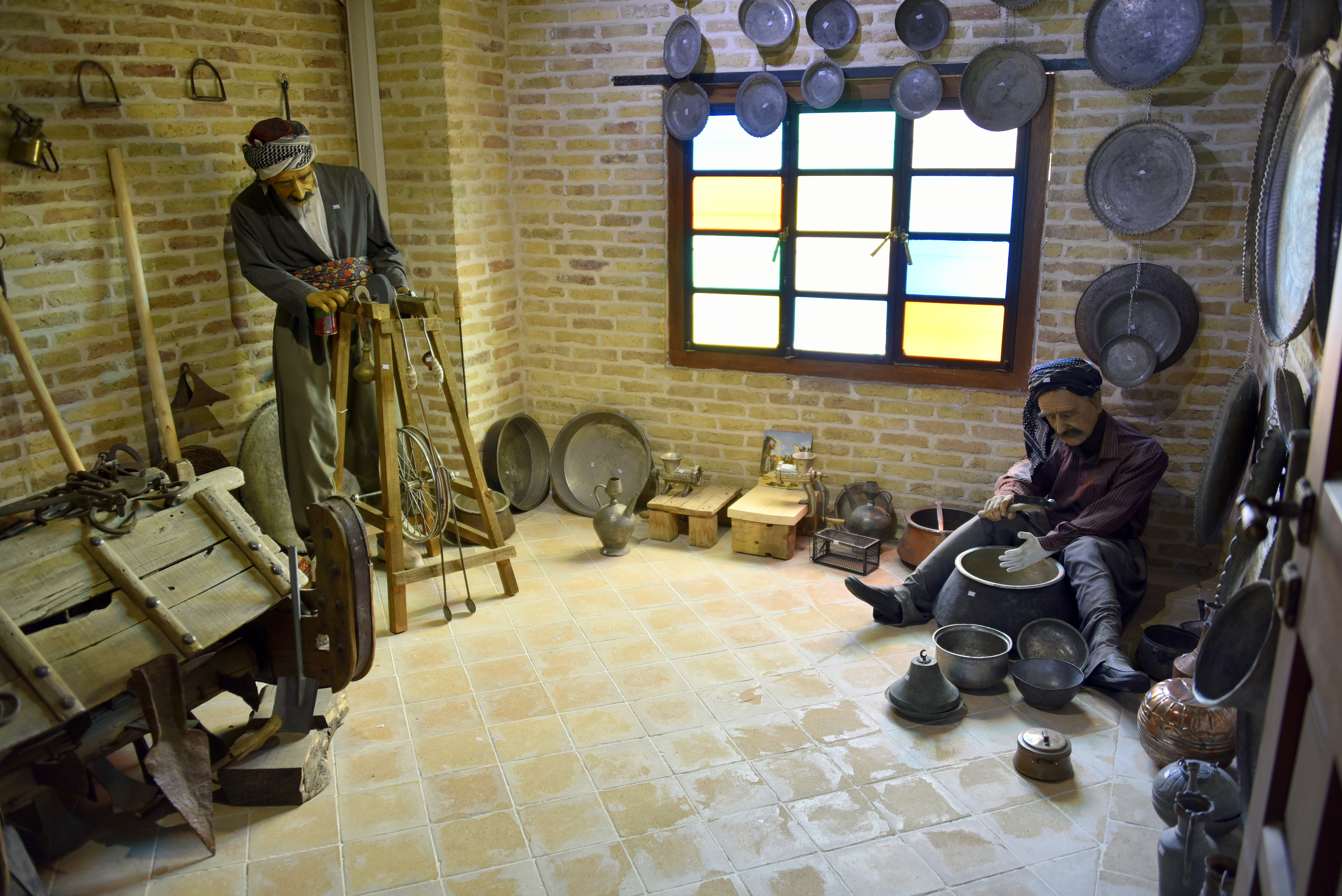
Coppersmith; making of trays, pots, jugs, and a variety of household objects

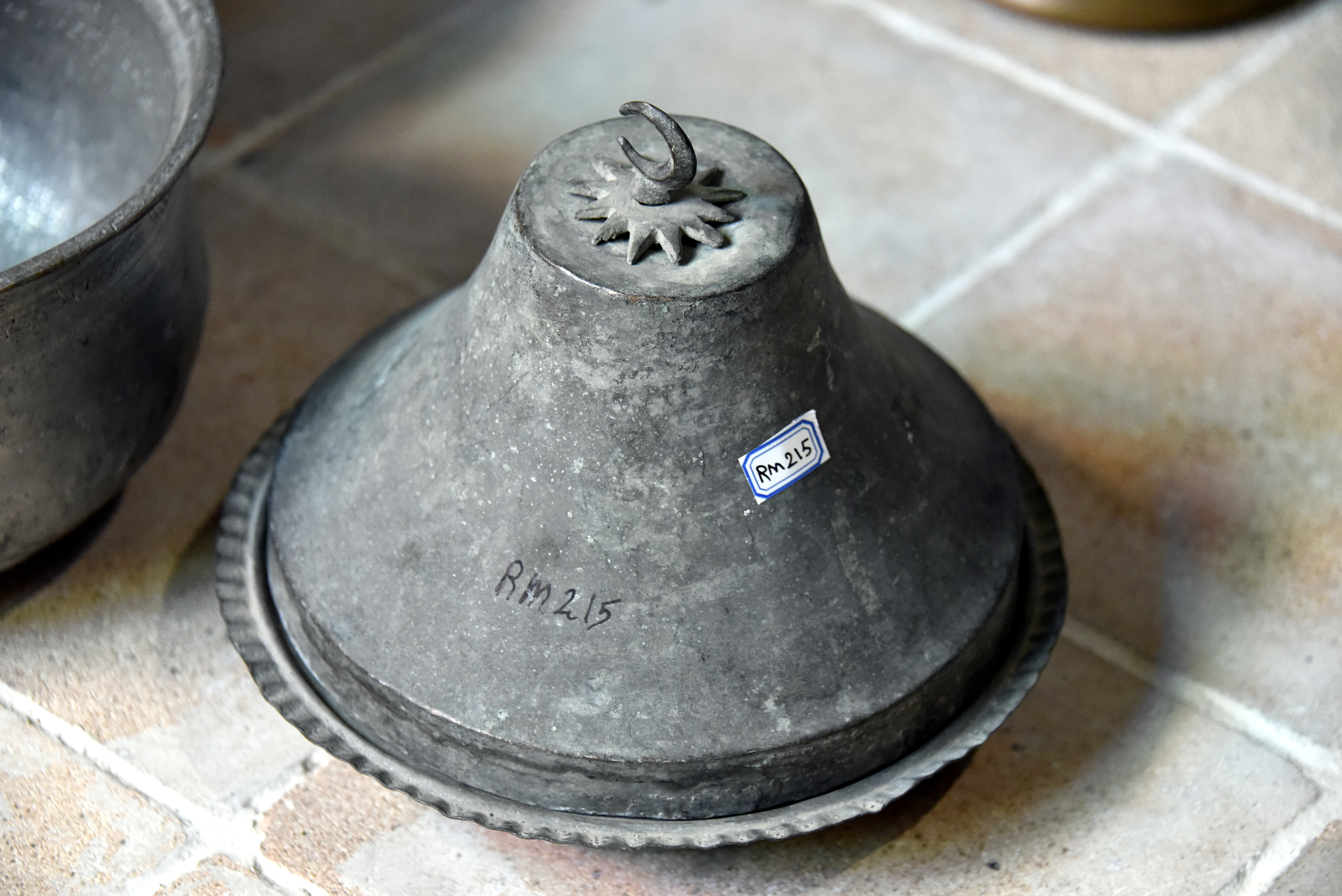
Cooking utensil or tool used for cooking Parda Plaw. Made in Sulaymaniyah, Ottoman period, c. 1850 CE

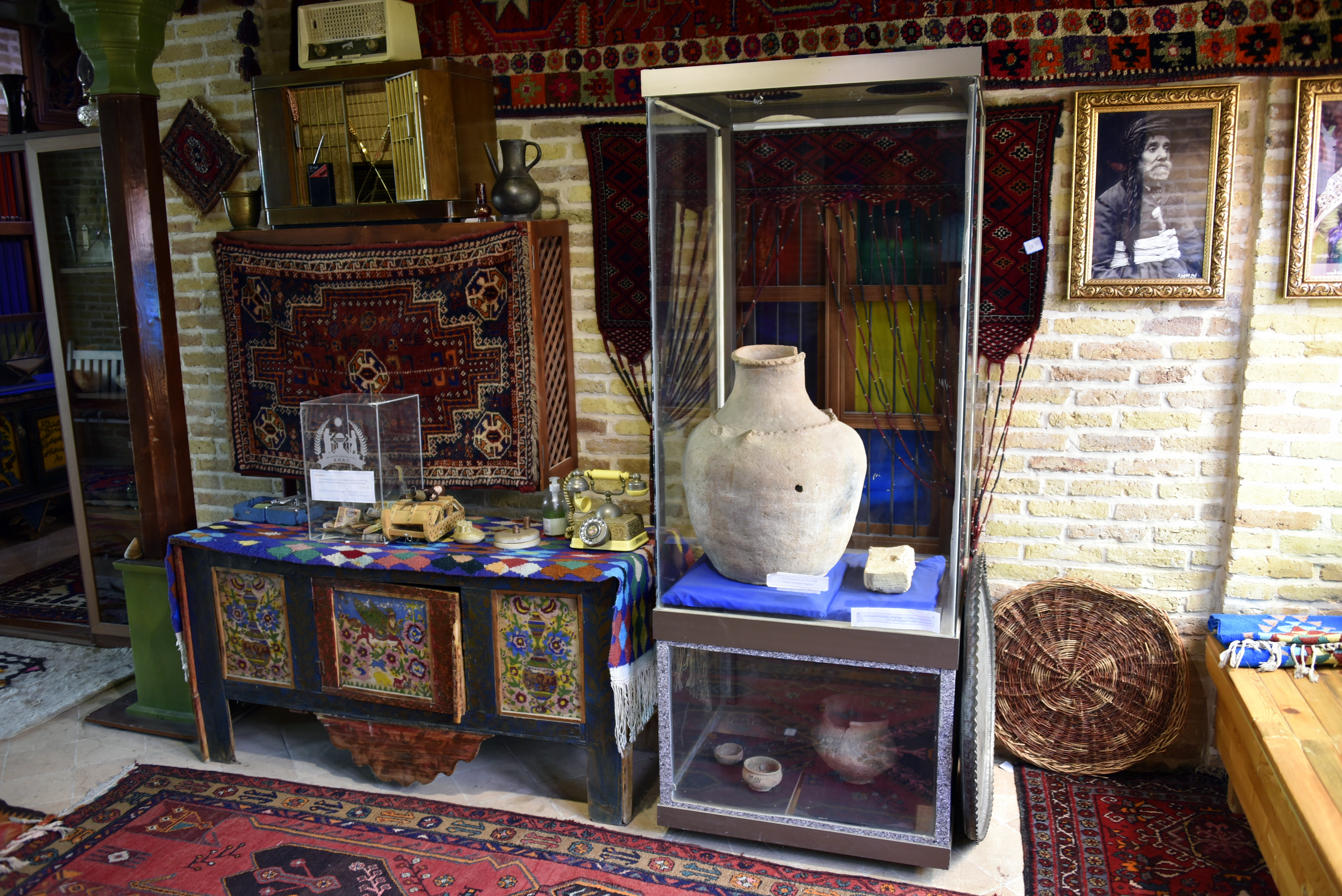
Part of one of the displaying halls of the Kurd's Heritage Museum, Sulaymaniyah, Iraqi Kurdistan

== Notes ==
- More images about Kurd's Heritage Museum can be found on Wikimedia Commons
