= Yazdin =

Yazdin (died 627) was an influential Iranian aristocrat, who served as the financial minister of the Sasanian king Khosrow II (r. 590–628).

== Biography ==
=== Origins and conversion to Christianity ===
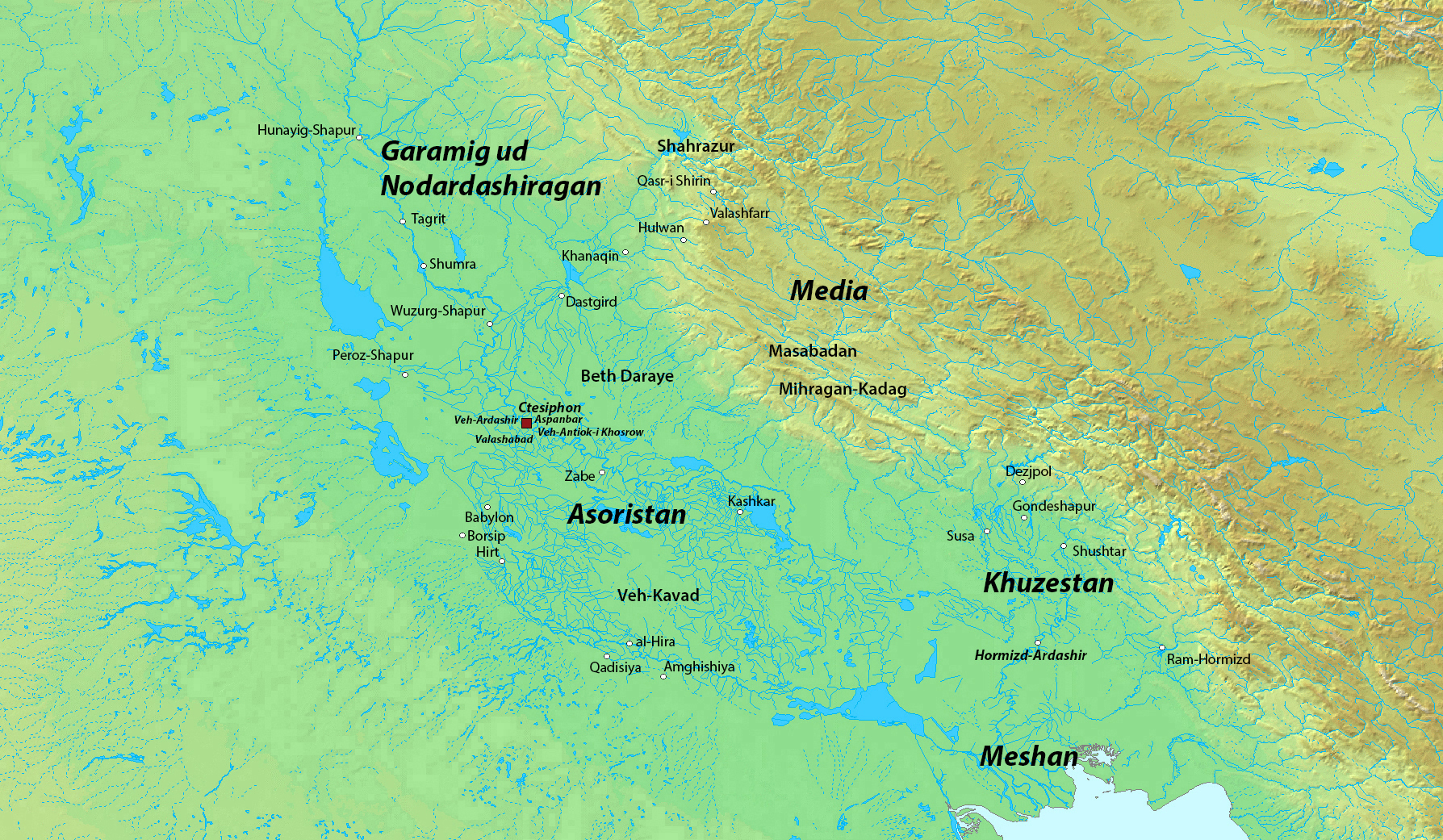
Map of the southwestern part of the Sasanian Empire.

Yazdin was a native of Kirkuk in the Garamig ud Nodardashiragan province; he belonged to a high-class Iranian family which practiced Zoroastrianism. He was the son a certain Mihryar, and had a brother named Dadgushnasp. Yazdin's mother was the daughter of the governor (marzban) of Nisibis. When Yazdin grew up, he was sent to a Zoroastrian school, which he, however, disliked and fled from. He shortly arrived to his foster parents who received him warmly. He was later found by his father, who, after having beaten him, sent him back to the school. Yazdin fled once again, and was in the end allowed to stay with his foster parents, while his brother Dadgushnasp would go to school instead. Yazdin visited the church several times with his foster parents, but in the end fled from them and got baptized.

=== Financial ministry and death ===
Due to his aristocratic origin, Yazdin had much land under his possession, mostly near Kirkuk and Margha. He is later mentioned as serving as the financial minister of king Khosrow II. Because Yazdin was a Christian and member of the Church of the East, he did everything, to improve the position of his coreligionists. Yazdin built numerous churches and enjoyed the fullest confidence of Khosrow.

During the Byzantine–Sasanian War of 602–628, a certain Yazden was appointed as the governor of Armenia. This Yazden may have been the same person as Yazdin. In 614, the Sasanians seized the True Cross and brought it to the capital Ctesiphon, where Yazdin took care of the cross and had a celebration along with the other Christians of the Empire. He then sent a piece of the cross to Mount Izla, a place near Nisibis.

Yazdin also had rivals at the Sasanian court of Ctesiphon, which included Khosrow's wife Shirin, and the royal physician Gabriel of Sinjar, who unlike him, were both Miaphysite Christians, and were attempting to push back the influence of the Nestorian Christians in favor of their church.

However, in 624, the Byzantine emperor Heraclius turned the tide of war against the Sasanians, and advanced into northern Adurbadagan, and by 627, he was close to Ctesiphon. These Sasanian failures made Khosrow so angry that he had several of his officers, including Yazdin, executed. Yazdin had a son named Shamta, who is said to have killed Khosrow. However, according to other sources, it was the Iranian aristocrat Mihr Hormozd, who had Khosrow killed.

== Sources ==
- Baum, Wilhelm (2004). Shirin: Christian Queen Myth of Love: A Woman Of Late Antiquity: Historical Reality And Literary Effect. Gorgias Press LLC. ISBN 978-1-59333-282-2.
- Peter Brown: The Rise of Western Christendom. 2 expanded edition. Oxford 2003.
- Nina Garsoian: Persia: The Church of the East. In: The history of Christianity. Edited by Luce Pietri, inter alia, Vol 3 (431-642). Freiburg im Breisgau 2005 (special edition, original 2001), pp. 1161–1186.
- John Martindale: The Prosopography of the Later Roman Empire. Bd. IIIa, Cambridge 1992, S. 612f.
- Morony, Michael G. (2005) [1984]. Iraq After The Muslim Conquest. Gorgias Press LLC. ISBN 978-1-59333-315-7.
- Becker, Adam H. (2013). Fear of God and the Beginning of Wisdom: The School of Nisibis and the Development of Scholastic Culture in Late Antique Mesopotamia. University of Pennsylvania Press. ISBN 9780812201208.
- Pourshariati, Parvaneh (2008). Decline and Fall of the Sasanian Empire: The Sasanian-Parthian Confederacy and the Arab Conquest of Iran. London and New York: I.B. Tauris. ISBN 978-1-84511-645-3.
- Walker, Joel Thomas (2006). The Legend of Mar Qardagh: Narrative and Christian Heroism in Late Antique Iraq. University of California Press. ISBN 978-0-520-93219-7.
