= Garmekan =

Province of the Sasanian Empire

Garmekan Garmekān
- Province of the Sasanian Empire
- 293/4–before 410
- Map of Garmekan
- Capital: Karka d-Beth Slokh
- Historical era: Late Antiquity
  - Established: 293/4
  - Merged with Nodshiragan: before 410
Preceded by	Succeeded by
Adiabene	Garamig ud Nodardashiragan
- Today part of: Iraq

Garmekan or Garamig was an early Sasanian province located in northern Mesopotamia, between the Little Zab and Diyala river. Its capital was Karka d-Beth Slokh. The province is omitted in Shapur I's (r. 240–270) list of provinces in the Ka'ba-ye Zartosht inscription, which indicates that it was part of Nodshiragan during that period. Garmekan is first attested as a Sasanian province in the Paikuli inscription of Narseh (r. 271–293) in 293/4, who describes how the aristocracy of Asoristan, Garmekan, and Shahrazur met him at Hayan i Nikatra in order to convince him to become the new king. Before the Council of Seleucia-Ctesiphon in 410, Garmekan had been merged with the province of Nodshiragan, becoming known as Garamig ud Nodardashiragan.

== Sources ==
- Marciak, Michał (2017). Sophene, Gordyene, and Adiabene: Three Regna Minora of Northern Mesopotamia Between East and West. BRILL. ISBN 9789004350724.
- Morony, Michael G. (1989). "Bēṯ Garmē". Encyclopaedia Iranica, Vol. IV, Fasc. 2. p. 187.
- Morony, Michael G. (2005) [1984]. Iraq After The Muslim Conquest. Gorgias Press LLC. ISBN 978-1-59333-315-7.
- Shavarebi, Ehsan (2019). "Sasanians, Arsacids, Aramaeans: Ibn al-Kalbī's Account of Ardashīr's Western Campaign (2019)": 363–379.
