= Nanakaly Hospital for Hematology & Oncology =

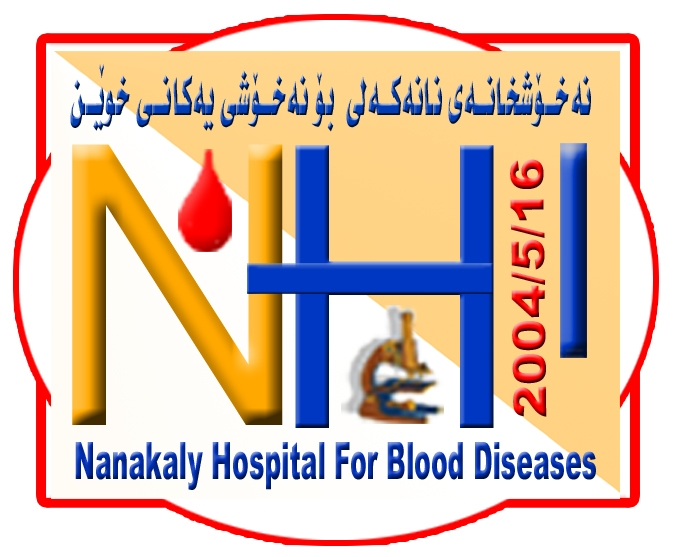

Geography
- Location: Azady, Arbil, Kurdistan region, Iraq
- Coordinates: 36°9′51″N 44°0′38″E

Services
- Emergency department: Yes
- Beds: 98

History
- Opened: 2004

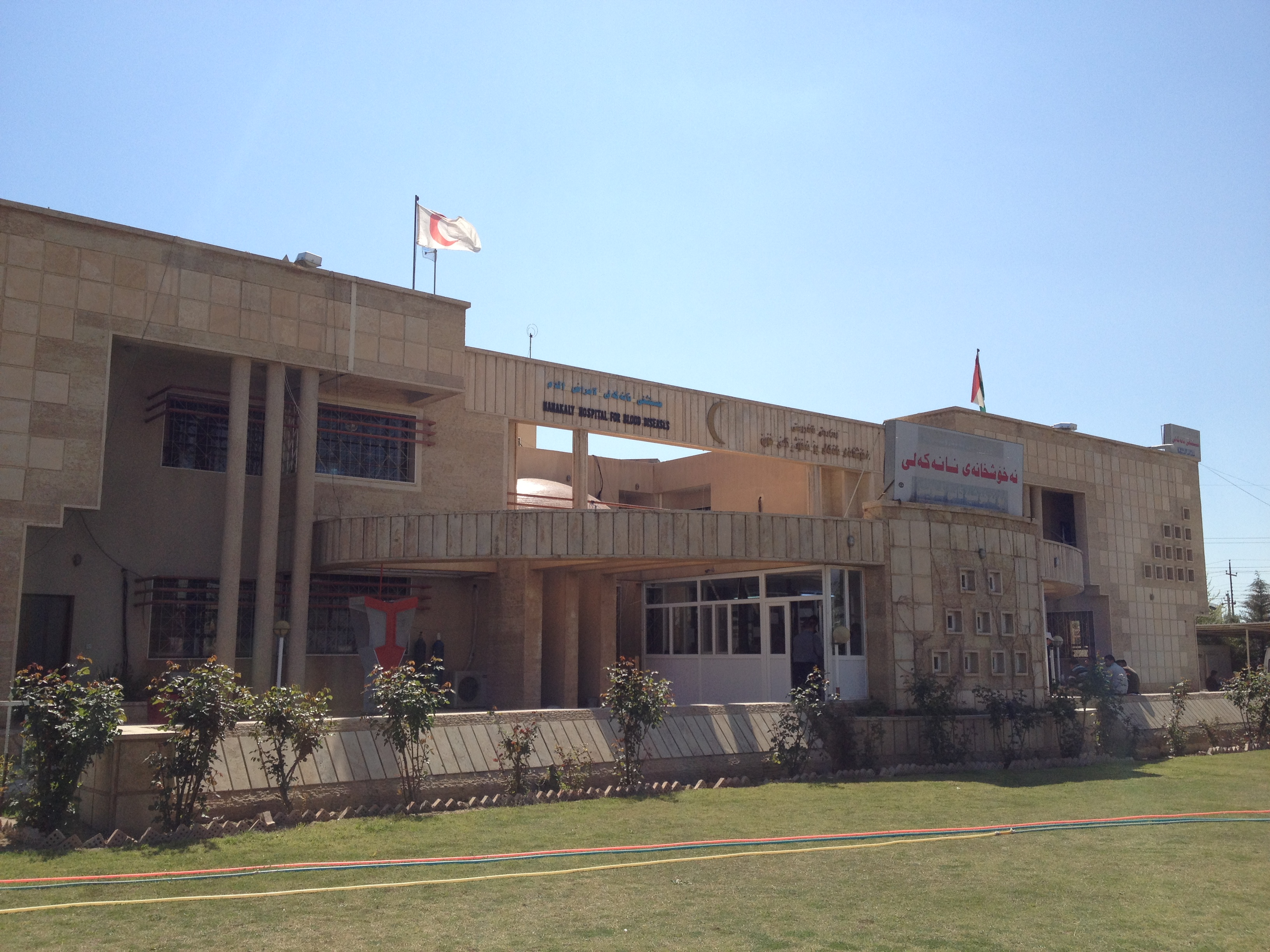
Nanakaly Hospital

Nanakaly Hospital for Hematology & Oncology is a government hospital located near No Shahed Martyr mosque, in Azady, Hawler, Kurdistan region, Iraq. It treats patients with blood disease, leukemia, and hemophilia. It was built by Ahmad Ismail Nanakaly and opened on 16 May 2004.

== Departments ==
- Management
- Emergency
- Laboratory
- Pediatric
- Hemophilia
- Oncology
- Others (driver, storage, kitchen)
