= Khalidiya Khanqah Mosque and Tekke =

Sufi lodge, mosque, and marketplace located in Erbil, Kurdistan Region, Iraq

- جامع وتكية خانقاه الخالدية
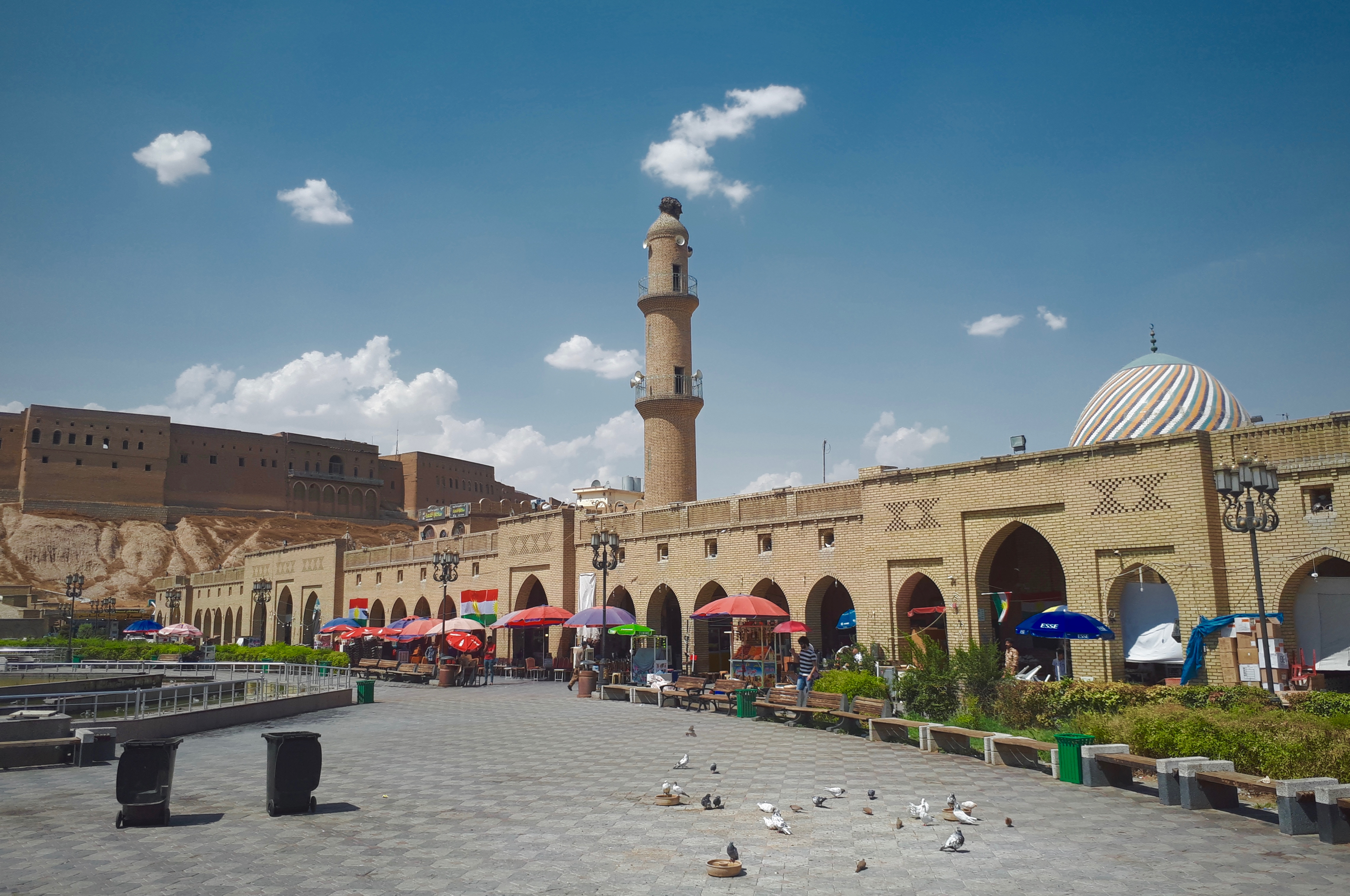
- The mosque, tekke, and marketplace in 2017

- Location of the religious complex in Iraq

Religion
- Affiliation: Sunni Islam
- Rite: Sufism
- Ecclesiastical or organizational status: Mosque; Tekke
- Status: Active

Location
- Location: ڕزگارت, Kirkuk, Erbil, Erbil Governorate, Kurdistan Region
- Country: Iraq
- Coordinates: 36°11′20″N 44°00′40″E

Architecture
- Type: Islamic architecture
- Founder: Mawlana Khalid al-Naqshbandi
- General contractor: Mawlana Khalid al-Naqshbandi
- Completed: 1805 CE; 1961 (renovation)

Specifications
- Capacity: 500 worshippers
- Interior area: 1,218 m^{2} (13,110 sq ft)
- Minaret: One
- Minaret height: 27 m (89 ft)
- Materials: Bricks; iron
- Building details

General information
- Type: Religious building and marketplace
- Renovated: 1961

Renovating team
- Main contractor: Sheikh Muhammad Salih

The Khalidiya Khanqah Mosque and Tekke (Arabic: جامع وتكية خانقاه الخالدية), also known as the Mzgawti Xanaqa (Kurdish: مزگەوتی خەنقە), is a religious complex comprising a Sufi mosque, tekke, library, and marketplace, located near the UNESCO World Heritage citadel in the city of Erbil, in the Erbil Governorate of the Kurdistan Region of Iraq. Completed in 1805 CE, the site was renovated in 1961.

== History ==
The mosque and its adjoining Sufi lodge were founded in 1805 by the Kurdish Muslim scholar, Mullah Hidayatullah al-Arbili, on the orders of a Naqshbandi dervish named Mawlana Khalid al-Naqshbandi. The local Naqshbandi dervishes of Erbil served as the management for the religious complex, amongst them Sheikh Muhammad Salih who supervised a complete rebuild and renovation in 1961. A marketplace was developed around the mosque, as well as the Shar Park opposite it. The surrounding citadel was added to the UNESCO World Heritage List in 2014.

The surrounding neighbourhood of the mosque, dating back to at least 800 years during the reign of the Ayyubids over Kurdistan, has become known as the Khanqah neighbourhood due to its famed presence.

== Architecture ==
The religious complex is 1,218 square metres (13,110 sq ft) in area, built with bricks, and has capacity for approximately 500 worshippers. The mosque minaret is 27 metres (89 ft) high with two accessible balconies, while the prayer hall is topped by a large dome with an internal frame structure made out of iron. The library contains ancient manuscripts, religious books, and other material in Arabic, Turkish, and Persian languages. Aside from the prayer hall, there are residential quarters for the Imam, the muezzin, and the mosque's workers.

== Gallery ==
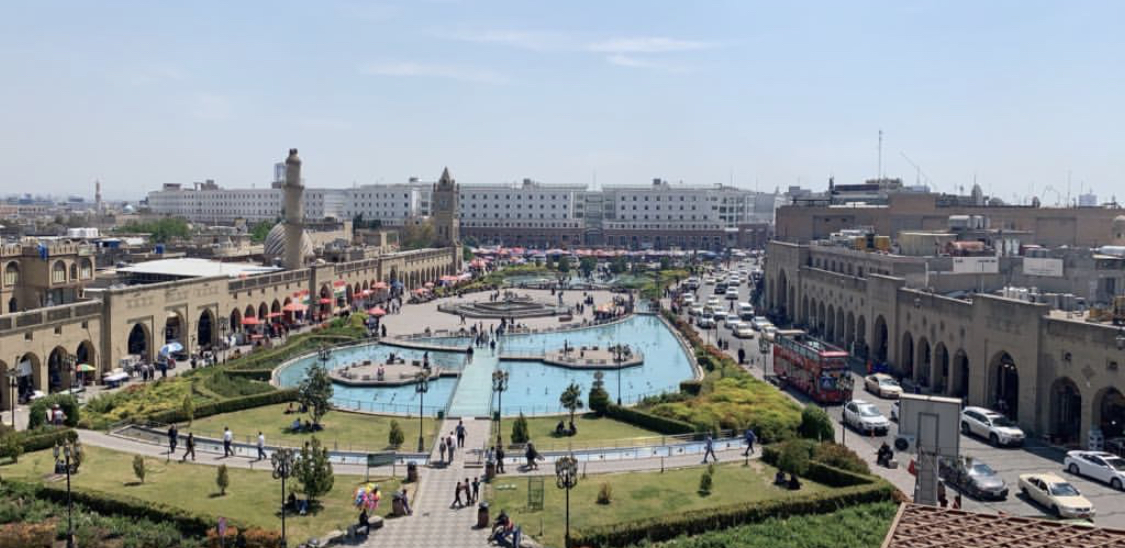
Panoramic view of the Shar Park from the citadel, the mosque on the left

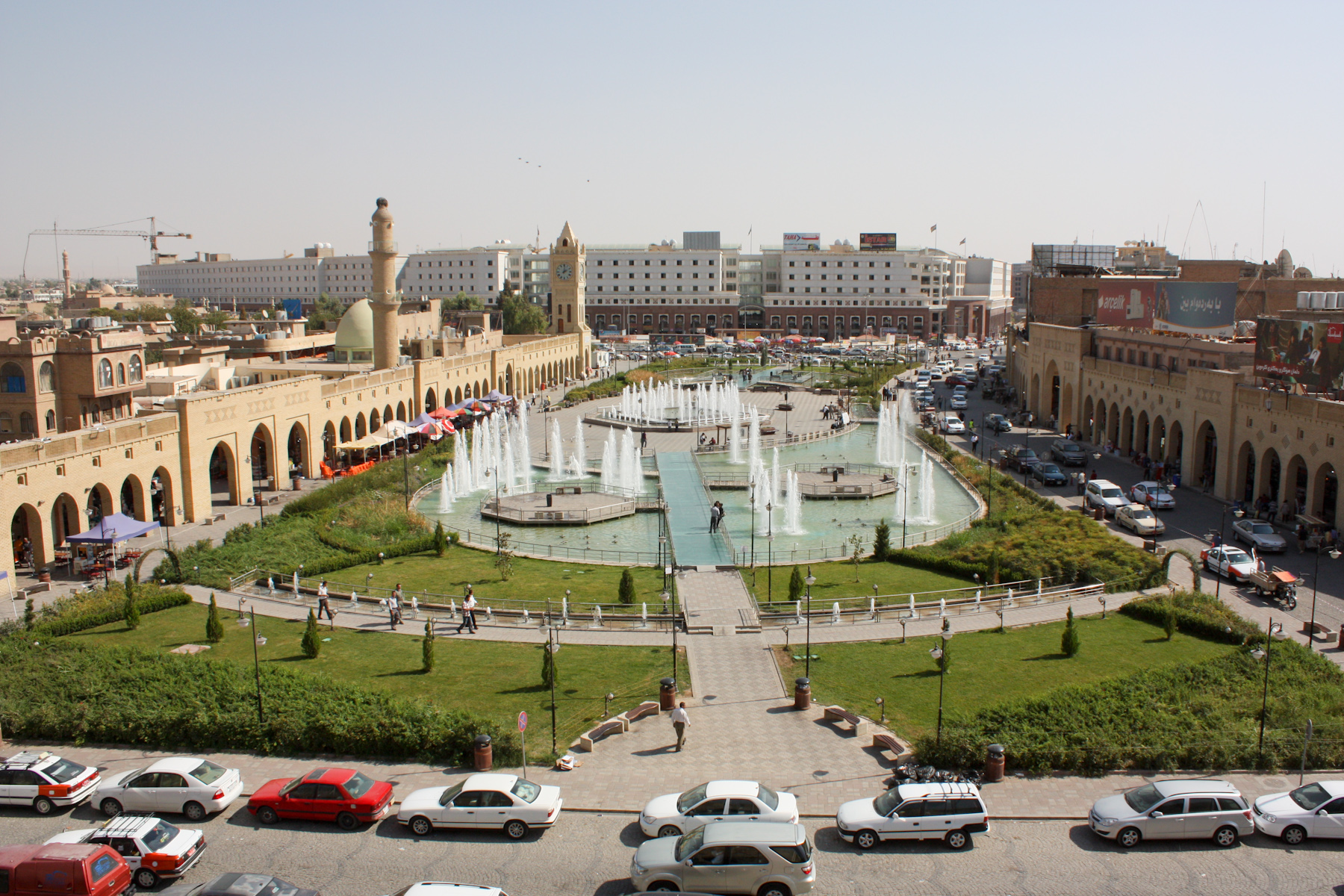
A similar view, in 2011

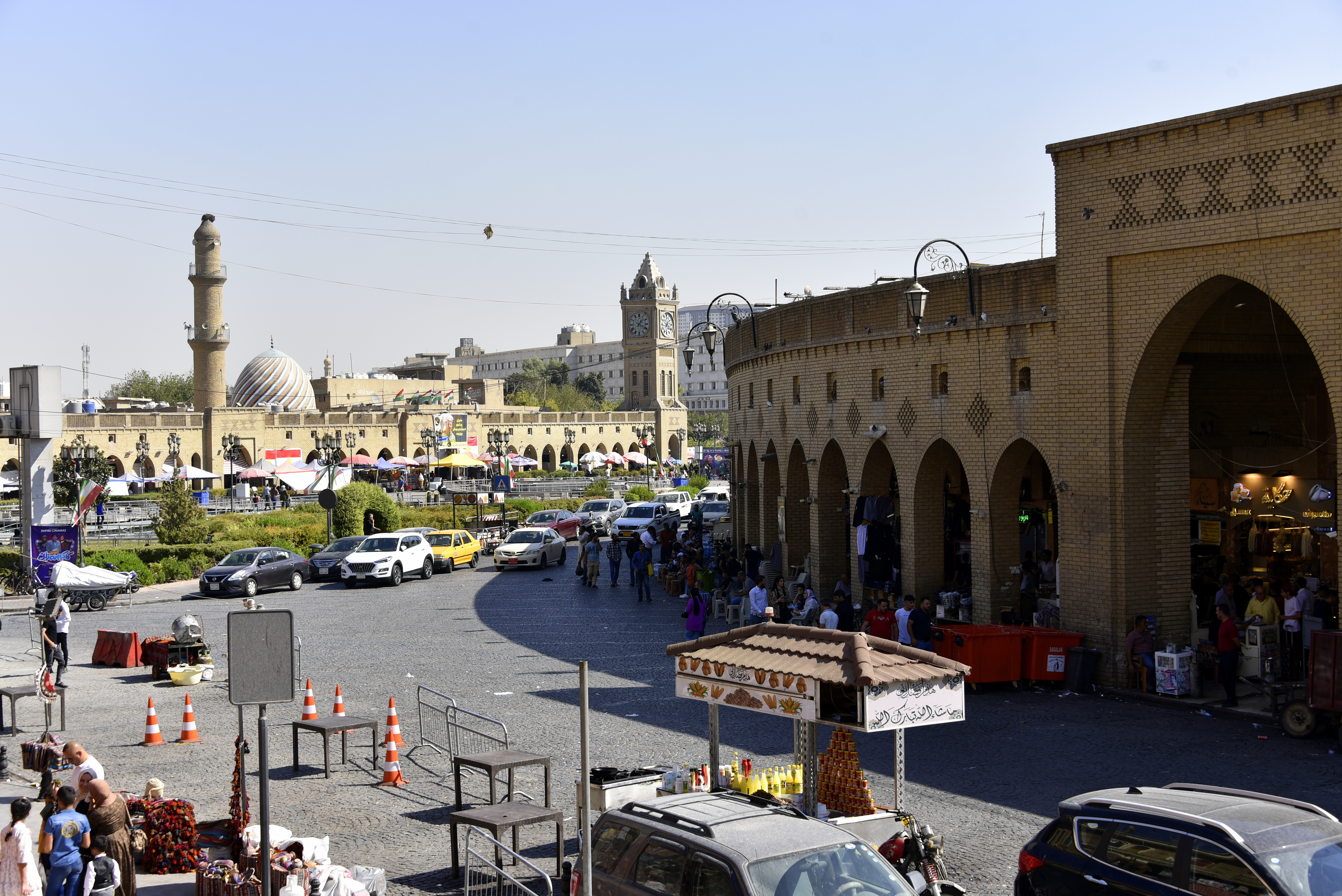
The mosque from Qalat street, below the citadel

== See also ==
- Islam in Iraq
- List of mosques in Iraq
- List of World Heritage Sites in Iraq
