= English Village, Erbil =

British-built housing complex in Kurdistan Region, Iraq

English Village
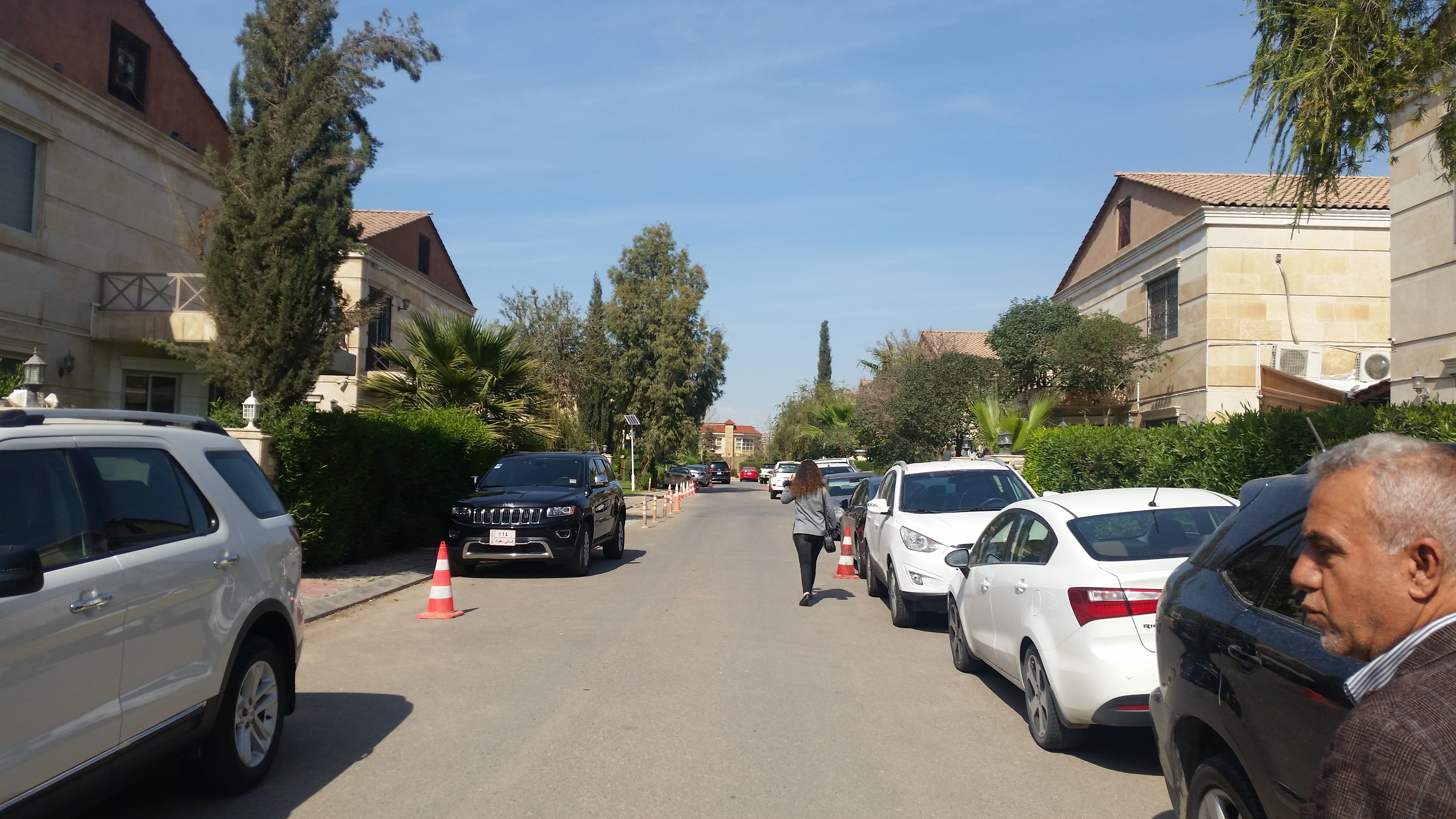
- Street in English Village

- Location within Iraqi Kurdistan Location within Iraq
- Coordinates: 36°11′34″N 43°58′18″E
- Country: Iraq
- Autonomous region: Kurdistan Region
- Province: Erbil Governorate
- Municipality: Erbil

Area
  - Total: 26 ha (64 acres)

English Village (Sorani Kurdish: گوندی ئینگلیزی) is a British-built luxury housing compound located in western Erbil, Kurdistan Region, Iraq. The compound contains identical villas, the vast majority of which are used as offices for companies. English Village is among several modern compounds in Erbil named after Western countries, such as American Village, Italian Village and German Village. It represents an economic boom that occurred in Erbil at the turn of the 2010s.

== History ==
The compound was originally conceived by Rezgar Ghafor, a British-Iraqi entrepreneur and NGO worker, with the goal of providing affordable housing for the people of Erbil. In his vision, the project aimed to meet the growing demand for quality living spaces while keeping them accessible. To make this idea a reality, Rezgar Ghafor brought together a consortium known as the Hawler Housing Project. This consortium included the British property development company J.M. Jones & Sons, a local construction business, and a representative from the local government.

The project was supported by a 2004 initiative from the UK Foreign Office's Trade and Industry Department, which helped facilitate the collaboration. Construction and sales began in early 2006, with the total development cost reaching US$76,000,000 In July 2019, an illicit gambling scheme operating out of a casino in English Village was shut down by the Kurdish security forces.

== Characteristics ==
English Village contains 420 villas, covering a total of 26 hectares (64 acres). Each villa has 235 square metres (2,530 sq ft) of floor space on two floors and contains five bedrooms, full air conditioning, fitted kitchens and two bathrooms with combined Eastern and Western toilets. The villas are reported to have a reliable electricity supply and sanitation system, in contrast to other areas of Erbil and Iraq. The compound also contains a school and five-storey shopping centre.

In 2006, the purchase cost of each villa was US$125,000, while in 2008 it was US$200,000, and in 2011 it was US$500,000. In 2011, the rent cost was around US$3,400 per month.

== Demographics ==
The complex is populated mostly by upper-class locals, foreign businesspeople and aid workers. The vast majority of villas in the complex are used as offices for companies.

== In the media ==
In 2019, GQ Australia featured English Village in a photography series on the urban development of Erbil.
