= Mudhafaria Minaret =

Minaret in Erbil, Iraq

- المنارة المظفرية
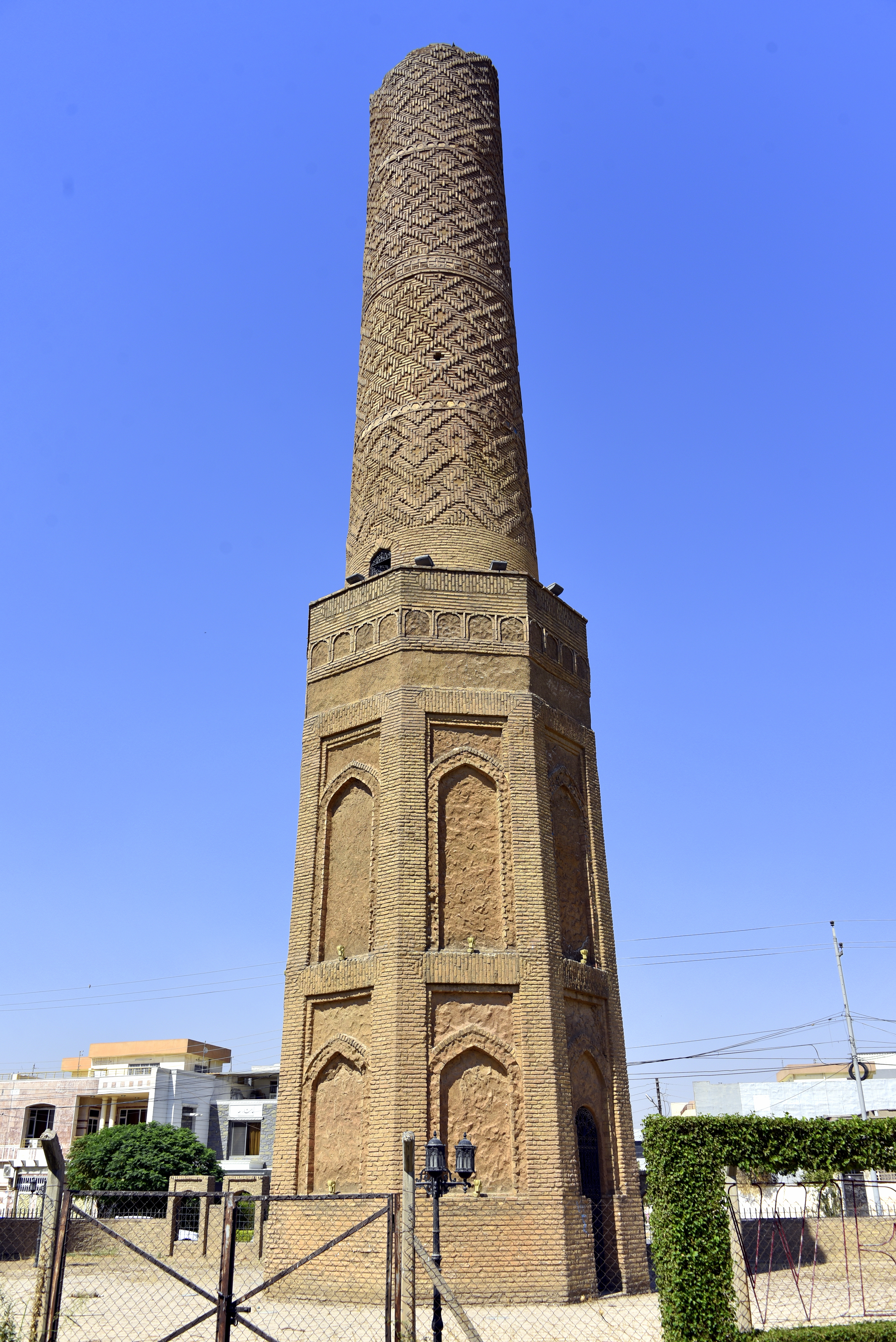
- The minaret in 2022

- Location of the minaret in Iraq

Religion
- Affiliation: Sunni Islam
- Ecclesiastical or organisational status: Minaret
- Status: Active

Location
- Location: Erbil, Kurdistan Region
- Country: Iraq
- Interactive map of Mudhafaria Minaret
- Coordinates: 36°11′15″N 43°59′59″E

Architecture
- Type: Islamic architecture
- Creator: Muzaffar Al-Din Abu Sa’eed Al-Gawkaboori (Gökböri)
- Groundbreaking: 586 AH (1190/1191 CE)
- Completed: 630 AH (1232/1233 CE)

Specifications
- Minaret: One
- Minaret height: 36 m (118 ft)
- Inscriptions: Names of Muhammad and Mas'oudi Muhammadi (builders)
- Materials: Baked bricks

The Mudhafaria Minaret (Arabic: المنارة المظفرية, romanized: Al-Manārat al-Muẓaffariyya; Kurdish: منارەی چۆلی, romanized: Cholî Minare) is a minaret located in the new Minare Park on the west region of Erbil in the Kurdistan Region of Iraq.

== History ==
The minaret was built between 586 AH (1190/1191 CE) and 630 AH (1232/1233 CE) during the reign of Muzaffar al-Din Gökböri, the ruler of Erbil. Gökböri allied with Saladin during the Ayyubid expansion into the region and subsequently married Saladin's sister, Rabia Khatun.

== Architecture ==
The minaret is 36 metres (118 ft) high and is composed of a high octagonal base and a tall cylindrical shaft, with a balcony located between the base and the shaft. This design was typical for mosques built during the reign of the Ayyubid Sultanate. It is believed that the minaret is the only remnant of a mosque, since destroyed.

It is built of baked bricks, the base being decorated with two tiers of niches with pointed arches, two on each of the eight faces that are inscribed in rectangular frames. The balcony parapet is carved with twenty-four small niches, the access door to the minaret steps is on the eastern side of the octagonal base and leads top to the balcony. From there a small door gives access to steps inside the cylindrical shaft that led to the second balcony now collapsed.

The shaft tapers inward and is decorated with several bands of interlocking diagonal Hazar-Baf motifs that are separated with thin bands. Examples of Kufi calligraphy can be seen, showing the names of Muhammad and Mas'oudi Muhammadi, the builders of the minaret.

== Gallery ==
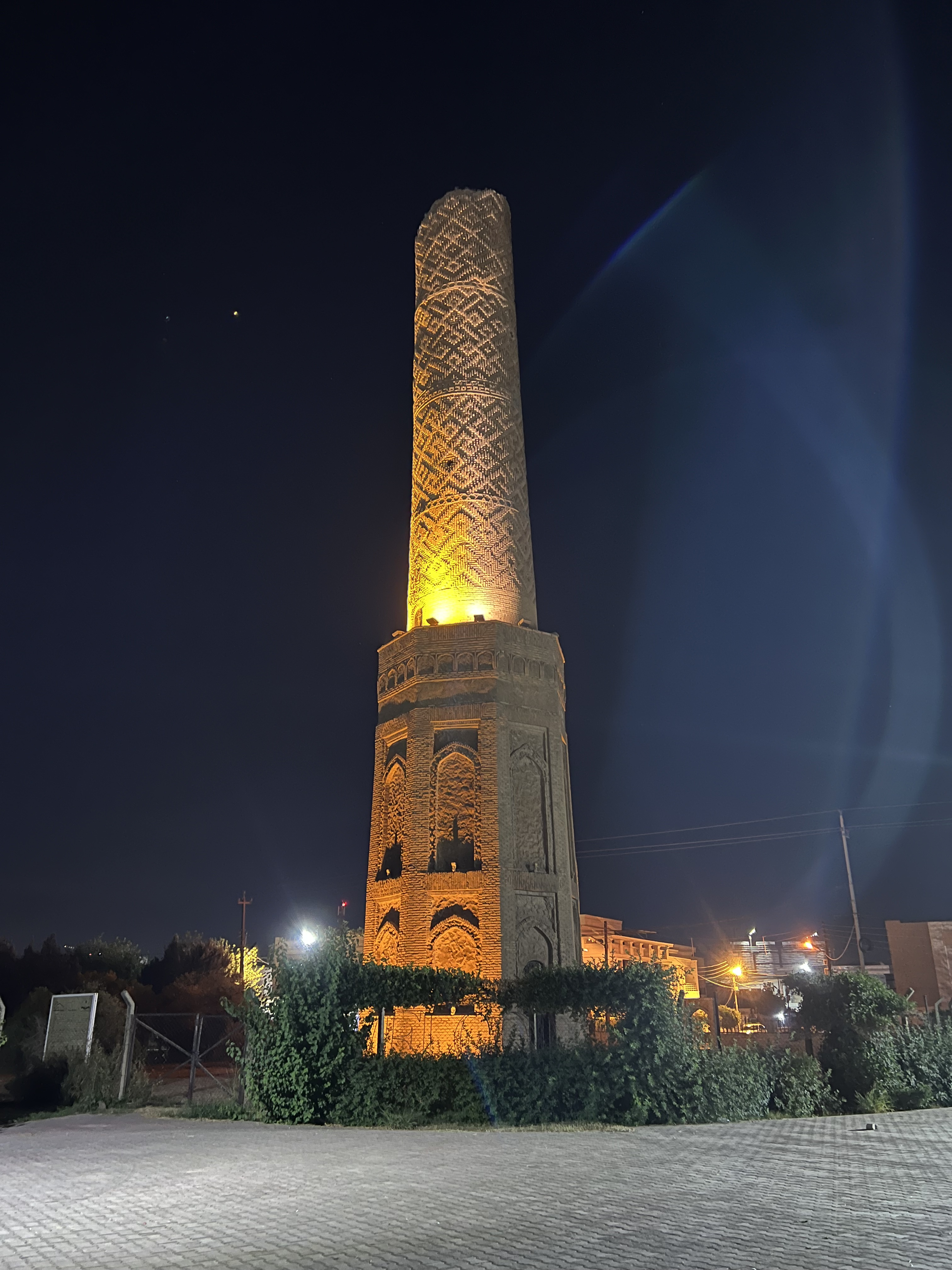
Night view of the illuminated Mudhafaria Minaret in Erbil.
