= List of cities in the Kurdistan Region =

List of the cities in the Kurdistan Region in Iraq

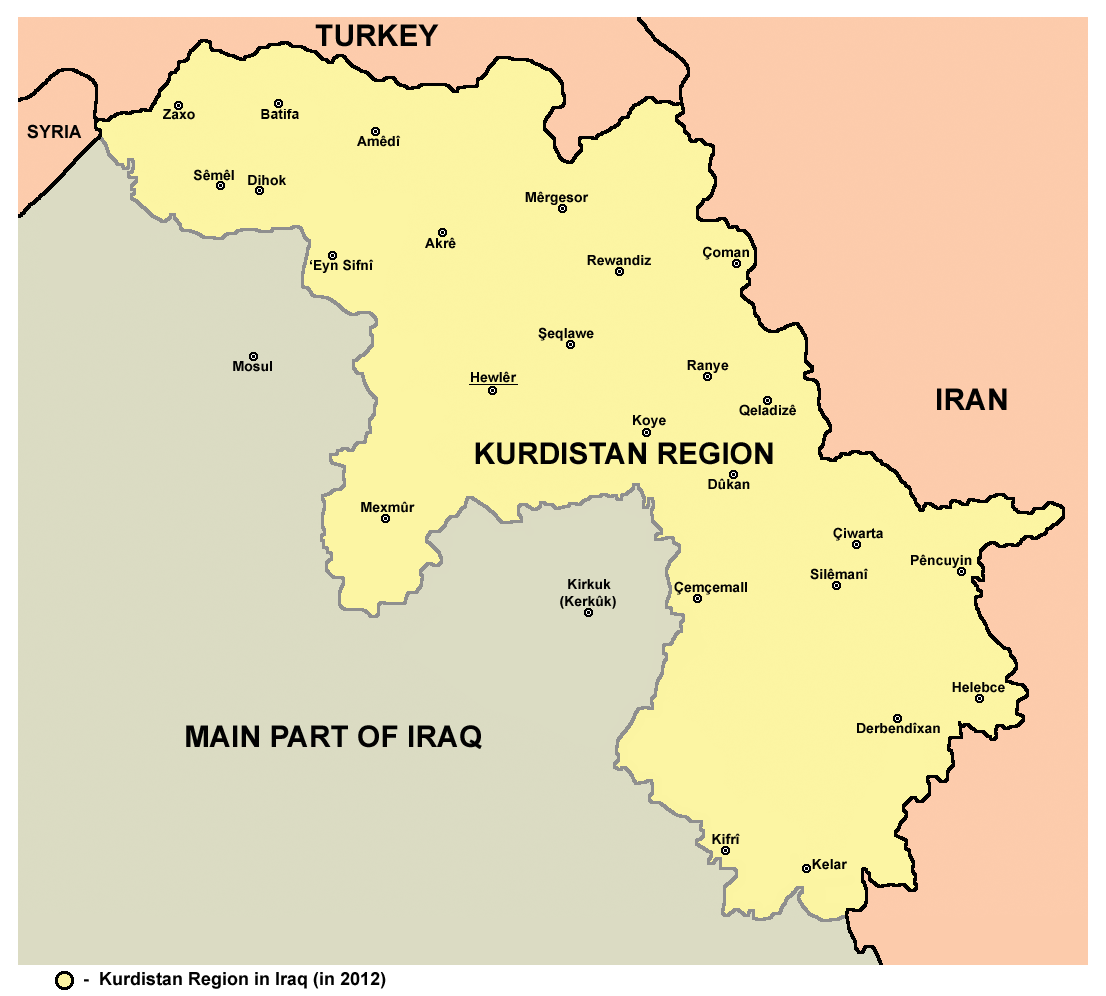
Borders of Kurdistan Region in 2012 according to Kurdistan Region Statistics Office web site and main cities and towns in the region.

This is a list of the cities in the Kurdistan Region in Iraq.

Name	Governorate	Kurdish name	Population
Erbil	Erbil	Hewlêr, ھەولێر	1,662,361
Sulaymaniyah	Sulaymaniyah	Silêmanî, سلێمانی	793,729
Duhok	Duhok	Dihok, دهۆک	520,039
Ranya	Sulaymaniyah	Řaniye, ڕانیە	257,577
Zakho	Duhok	Zaxo, زاخۆ	342,628
Batifa	Duhok	Batîfa, باتيفا	30,000
Soran	Erbil	Soran, سۆران	126,028
Shaqlawa	Erbil	Şeqllawe, شەقڵاوە	159,628
Halabja	Halabja	Hellebce, هه‌ڵه‌بجه	131,831
Rawandiz	Erbil	Řewandiz, ڕەواندز	52,399
Kalar	Sulaymaniyah	Kelar, کەلار	250,630
Chamchamal	Sulaymaniyah	Çemçemall, چه‌مچه‌ماڵ	173,000
Koy Sanjaq	Erbil	Koye, کۆیە	119,000
Simele	Duhok	Sêmêl, سێمێل	205,000
Ankawa	Erbil	'Enkawe, عەنكاوە	30,000
Akre	Duhok	Akrê, ئاکرێ	194,088
Amedi	Duhok	Amêdî, ئامێدی	28,619
Bamarni	Duhok	Bameřinê, بامەڕنی	5,000
Qaladiza	Sulaymaniyah	Qelladizê, قەلادزێ	126,016
Darbandikhan	Sulaymaniyah	Derbendîxan, دەربەندیخان	57,170
Penjwen	Sulaymaniyah	Pênciwên, پێنجوێن	49,015

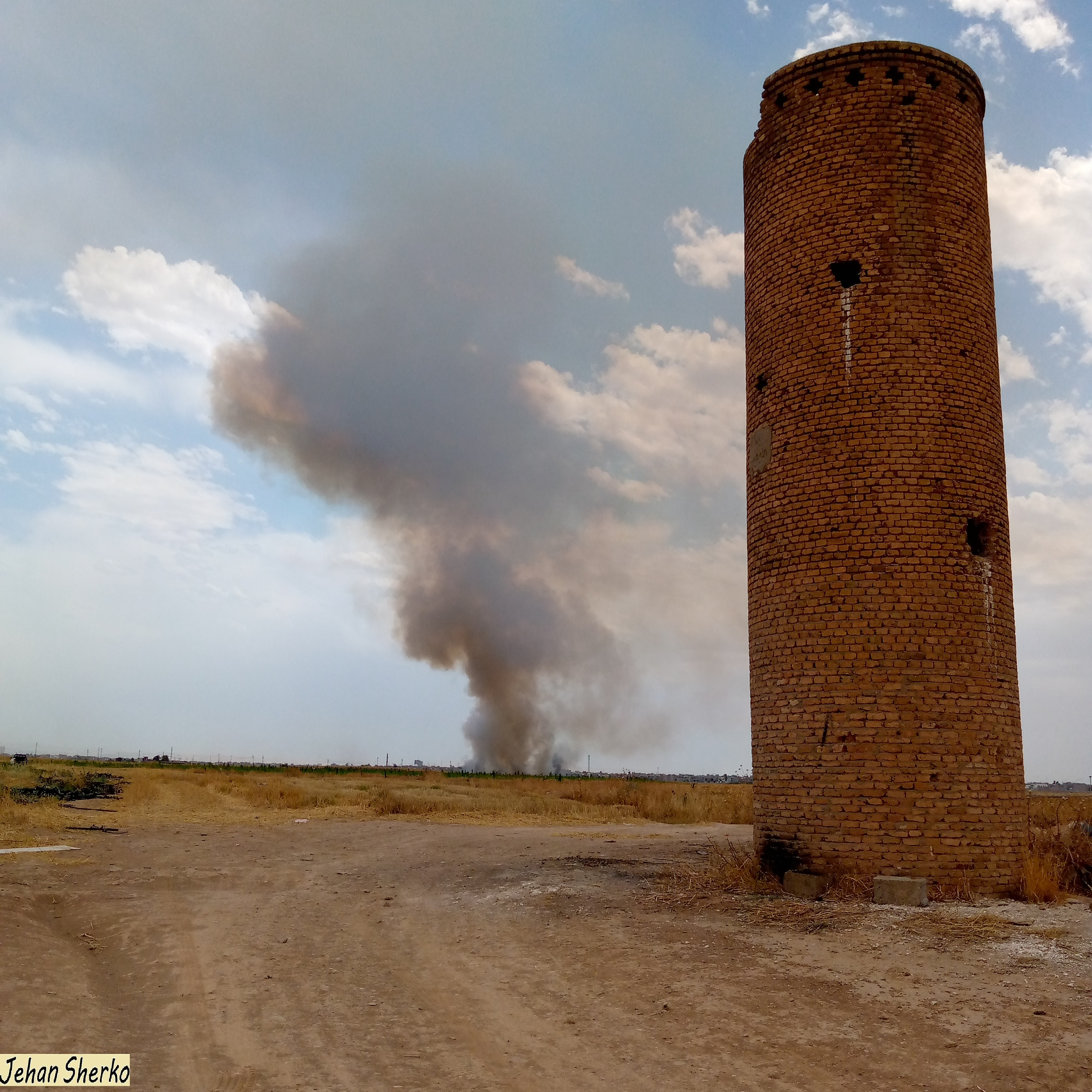
Azza village mill in Erbil

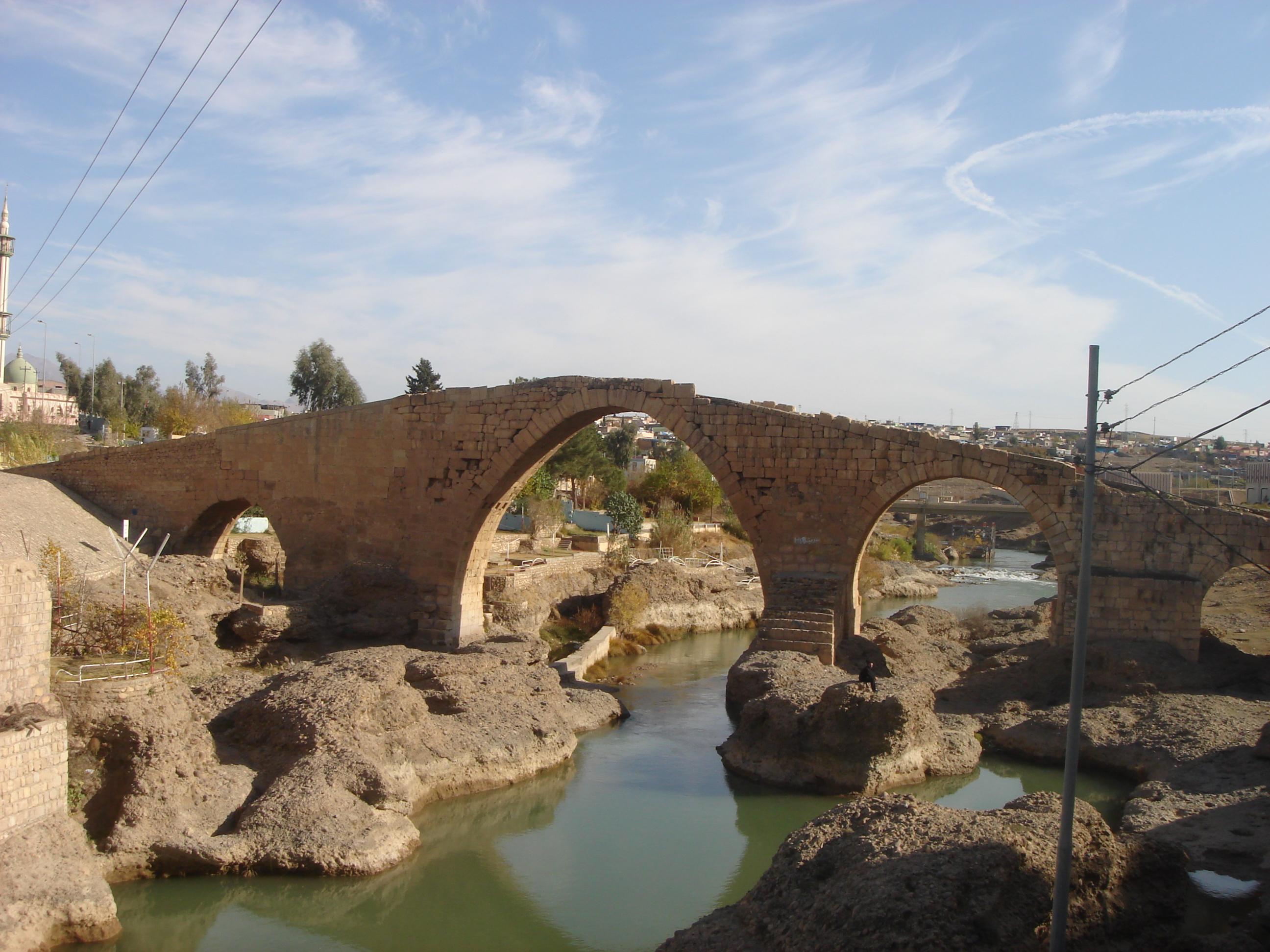
Delal Bridge in Zakho

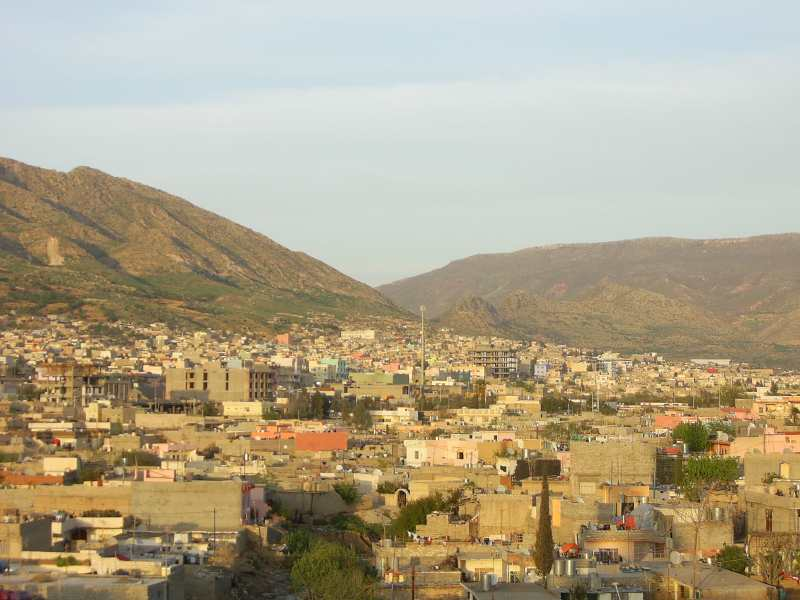
Duhok

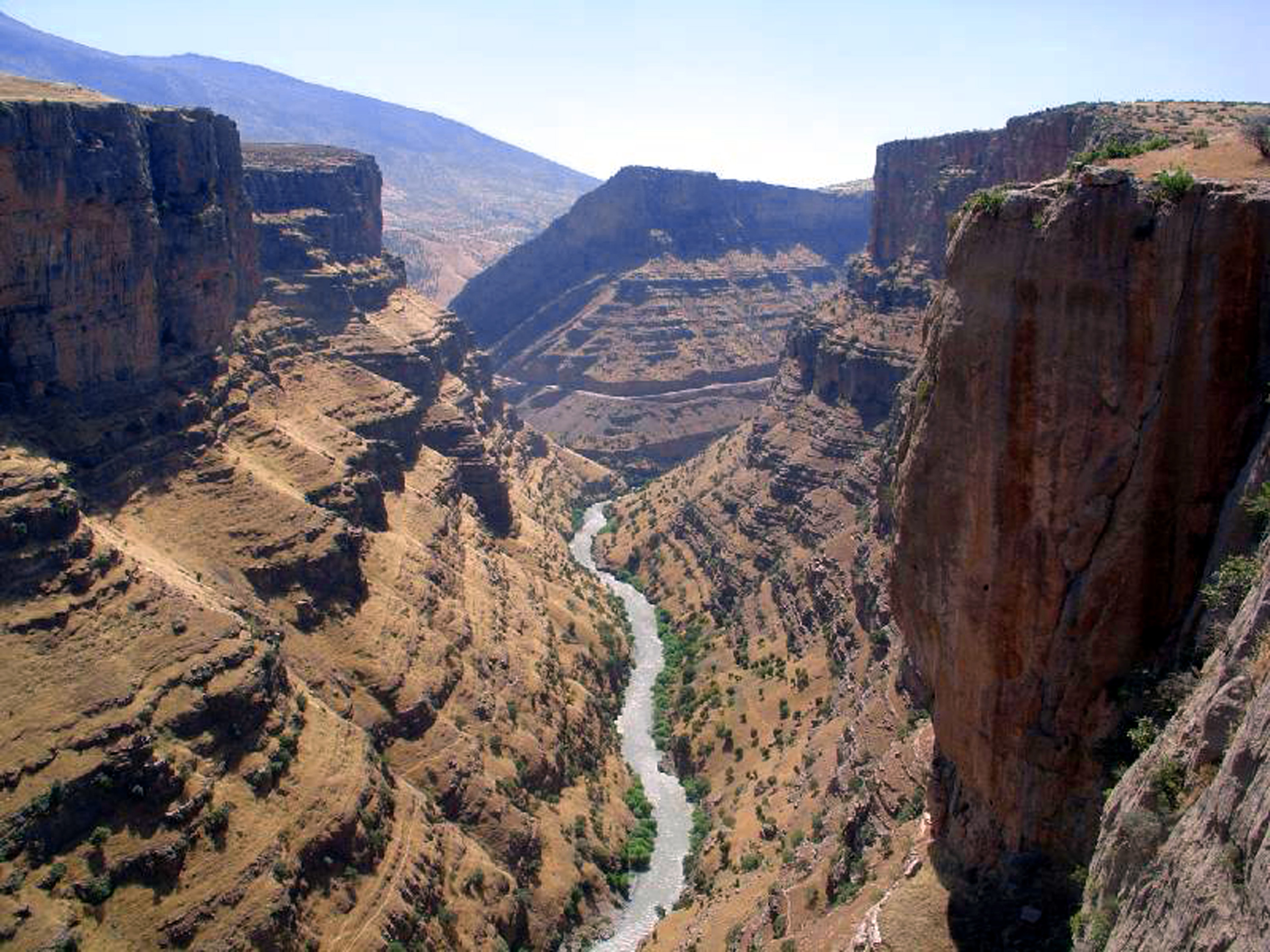
Canyon near to the city of Rawandiz

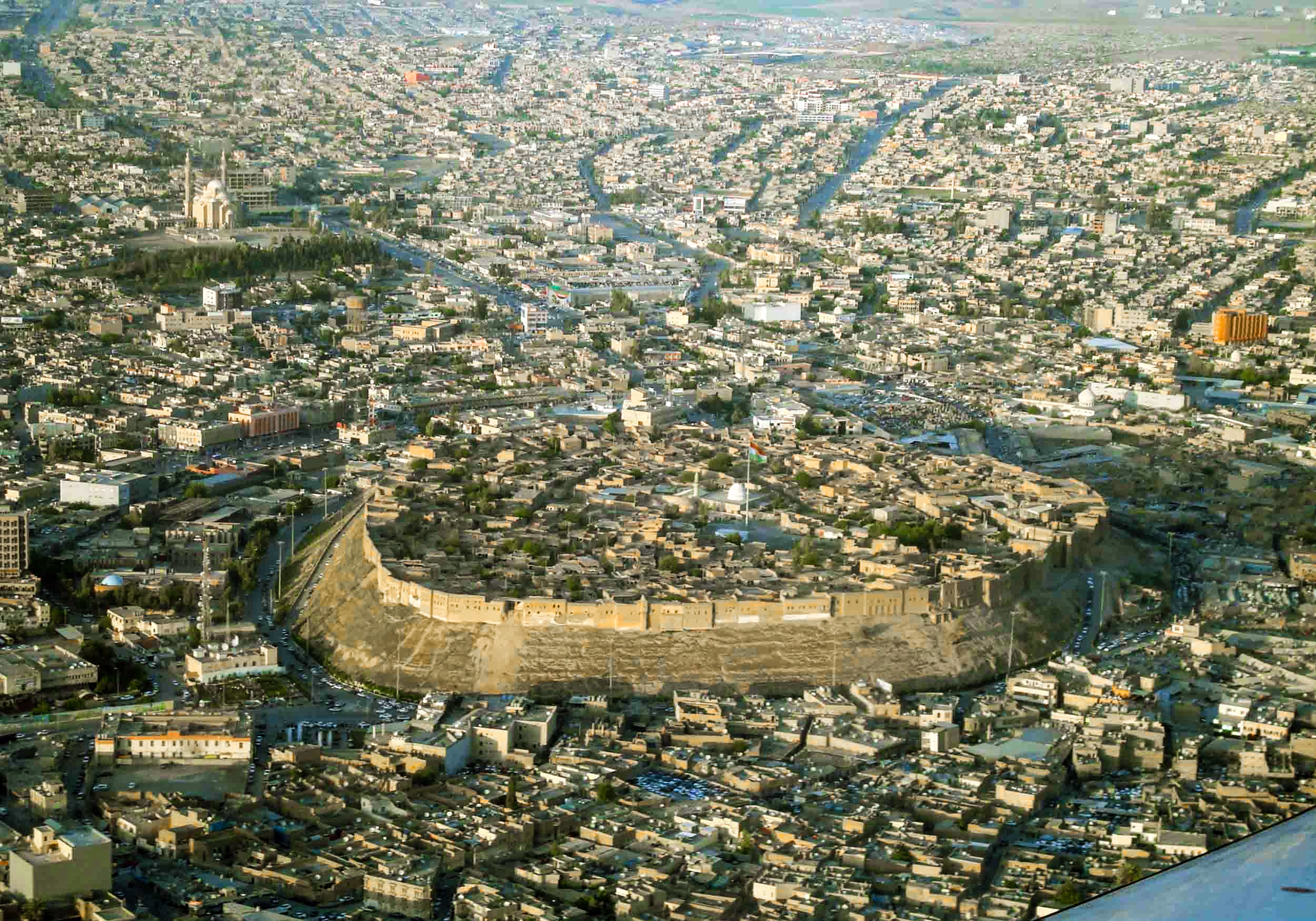
Erbil

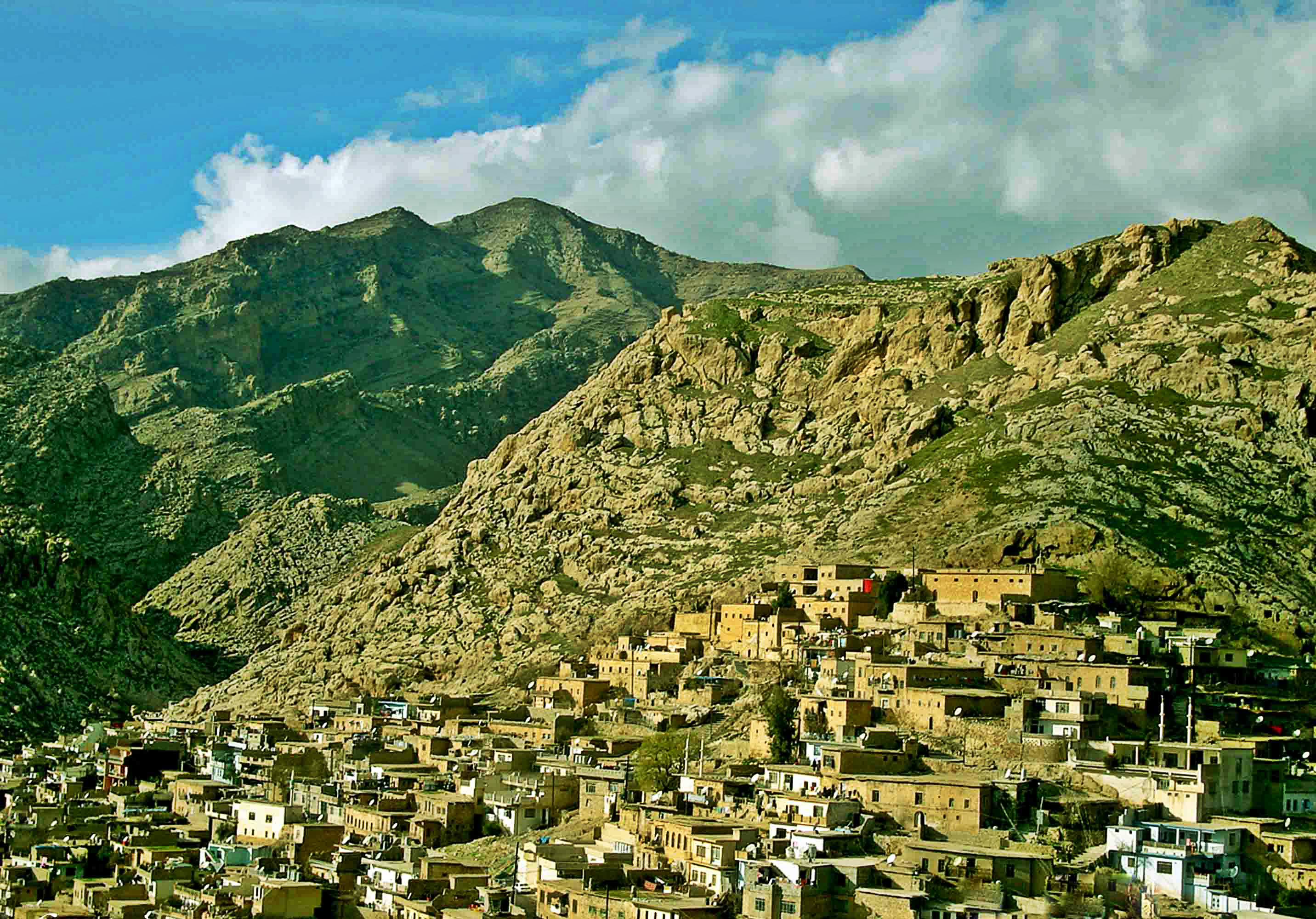
Akre

== See also ==
- List of archaeological sites in Erbil Governorate
- List of cities in Iraq
