= Pierre Villard =

French Assyriologist

- Born: Pierre Marcel Marie Villard; 26 July 1958; Saint-Étienne
- Died: 25 January 2023; Riom
- Education: Paris 1 Panthéon-Sorbonne University, École normale supérieure
- Employers: Blaise Pascal University (2000–2016); Paris 1 Panthéon-Sorbonne University (1988–2000)

Pierre Villard (born on 26 July 1958 Saint-Étienne – 25 January 2023 Riom) was a French historian and archaeologist of the Ancient Near East, Professor at the Université Clermont-Auvergne and member of the Archeorient laboratory - UMR 5133 French National Centre for Scientific Research CNRS, Lumière University Lyon 2.

== Life ==
Pierre lost his father during his early teenage years. A few years later, he developed a passion for Assyriology while studying under Paul Garelli and Dominique Charpin. A two-year teaching position (1983-85) in Latakia, along with travels throughout the Levant, provided him with a tangible understanding of the regions he was investigating. His curiosity deepened, leading him to specialize in two separate periods of Mesopotamian cultures, which were nearly a thousand years apart: the Mari era and the Neo-Assyrian period empire.

Pierre was admitted to the École normale supérieure de Saint-Cloud in 1978. Villard defended his doctoral thesis in June 1986, prepared at the Paris 1 Panthéon-Sorbonne University under the supervision of Paul Garelli, a specialist in the Assyrian world. The dissertation, entitled L'esprit de cour et le style des courtisans dans l'Assyrie des Sargonides, examined relations between Assyrian kings and their courtiers, particularly magicians and astrologers, from the reign of Sargon II (721-705 BC) to that of Assurbanipal (668-627 BC). Throughout his career, Pierre maintained a predilection for the Neo-Assyrian period and became a recognized authority in this field, while continuing to conduct studies on Mari.

In 1988, Pierre was elected Maître de conférences at the Université Paris 1 Panthéon-Sorbonne, where he taught classical ancient history, Near Eastern history, Akkadian language and cuneiform writing for twelve years. From early 1990, together with Francis Joannès, he was the editorial secretary of the journal Nouvelles Assyriologiques Brèves et Utilitaires (NABU), joining the editorial board in 1998. Since 2017 Villard was part of the scientific committee of the Ash-Sharq: Bulletin of the Ancient Near East – Archaeological, Historical and Societal Studies journal since its founding in 2017.

In January 2000, Pierre Villard defended his Habilitation to Supervise Research at the Université Paris 1 Panthéon-Sorbonne with a dissertation whose title, De Mari à Ninive, underlined the two poles of his research; Dominique Charpin was the advisor. In June of the same year, he was elected Professor of Ancient History at the Université Blaise-Pascal (Clermont II) in Clermont-Ferrand, now the Université Clermont-Auvergne, introducing the history of the Ancient East to the establishment, after Olivier Rouault had developed, from 1997 to 1999, the archaeology of the Ancient Near East in the History of Art department. Villard also became a member of the Archéorient team of the Maison de l'Orient et de la Méditerranée of Lyon II.

By the turn of the millennium, Pierre was recruited by what is now Université Clermont Auvergne, where he contributed to the development of a program dedicated to Assyriology—a professional degree previously offered only at institutions in Paris, Lille, Lyon, and Strasbourg. He produced a series of significant publications that provided valuable insights into various aspects of the Assyrian empire, including its administration, military, and architectural achievements. Additionally, he explored the diverse elements of its legal system. Pierre's work is characterized by meticulous attention to detail, insights drawn from overlooked sources, thoughtful analysis of the evidence, and remarkably persuasive conclusions. Simultaneously, he became involved in various projects and organizations at other universities, including those in Lyon, and served on committees assessing theses for advanced degrees.

Villard died a natural death.

== Works ==
- Battini, L.; Villard, P. (2006). Médecine et médecins au Proche-Orient ancien. Actes du Colloque international organisé à Lyon les 8 et 9 novembre 2002, Maison de l'Orient et de la Méditerranée, BAR International Series 1528. Oxford.
- Villard, P. (1986). "Un roi de Mari à Ugarit". Ugarit Forschungen. 18: 387–412.
- Villard, P. (1997). "L'éducation d'Assurbanipal, Ktèma". Civilisations de l'Orient, de la Grèce et de Rome antiques. 22: 135–149.
- Villard, P. (2000). "Les textes judiciaires néo-assyriens". In Joannès, F. (ed.). Rendre la justice en Mésopotamie. Saint-Denis: Presses Universitaires de Vincennes. pp. 171–200.
- Villard, P. (2002). "Les administrateurs de l'époque de Yasmah-Addu". In Durand, J.-M.; Charpin, D. (eds.). Mari, Ebla et les Hourrites, dix ans de travaux, deuxième partie. Actes du colloque international (Paris, mai 1993), Amurru, 2. Paris: ERC. pp. 9–140.
- Villard, P. (2006). "Le porc dans les sources néo-assyriennes". In Lion, B.; Michel, C. (eds.). De la domestication au tabou : le cas des suidés dans le Proche-Orient ancien, Travaux de la Maison René-Ginouvès 1. Paris: De Boccard. pp. 205–214.
- Villard, P. (2009). Briquel-Chatonnet, F.; Farès, S.; Lion, B.; Michel, C. (eds.). "Les femmes et l'écrit à l'époque néo-assyrienne". Topoi, Supplément. Femmes, cultures et sociétés dans les civilisations méditerranéennes et proche-orientales de l'Antiquité. 10. Lyon: 305–319.
