= Garamig ud Nodardashiragan =

Province of the Sasanian Empire

Garmekan ud Nodardashiragan Garmekan ud Nōd-Ardaxšīragān
- Province of the Sasanian Empire
- 410-630s
- Map of northern Mesopotamia and its surroundings under the late Sasanians
- Capital: Erbil and Kirkuk
- Historical era: Late Antiquity
  - Garmekan and Nodshiragan merged together: 410
  - Muslim conquest: 630s
| Preceded by | Succeeded by |
| Adiabene; Garmekan | Rashidun Caliphate |
- Today part of: Iraq

Garamig ud Nodardashiragan was a late Sasanian province in present-day northern Iraq. The province was a combination of two provinces, Garamig and Nodardashiragan. The province is first mentioned in the Nestorian hyparchies in 410. The main cities of the province were Kirkuk and Irbil, which served as the seats of Nestorian metropolitans. The province was conquered in 637 during the Arab conquest of Iran.

== Sources ==
- Brunner, Christopher (1983). "Geographical and Administrative divisions: Settlements and Economy". The Cambridge History of Iran: The Seleucid, Parthian, and Sasanian periods (2). Cambridge: Cambridge University Press. pp. 747–778. ISBN 978-0-521-24693-4.
- Morony, Michael (1989). "BĒṮ GARMĒ". Encyclopaedia Iranica, Vol. IV, Fasc. 2. p. 187.
- Zakeri, Mohsen (1995). Sasanid Soldiers in Early Muslim Society: The Origins of 'Ayyārān and Futuwwa. Otto Harrassowitz Verlag. pp. 1–391. ISBN 3447036524.
