= List of ambassadors to Austria =

This is a list of ambassadors to Austria. Note that some ambassadors are responsible for more than one country while others are directly accredited to Vienna.

== Current ambassadors to Vienna ==
Sending country	Presentation of the credentials	Location of resident embassy	Ambassador
Afghanistan	January 7, 2021	Vienna, Austria	Manizha Bakhtari
Albania	May 14, 2024	Vienna, Austria	Fatmir Velaj
Algeria	April 16, 2026	Vienna, Austria	Tahar Mohdeb (Chargé d’Affaires a.i.)
Andorra	January 13, 2020	Vienna, Austria	Jaume Serra Serra
Angola	May 10, 2023	Vienna, Austria	Isabel de Jesus da Costa Godinho
Argentina	December 18, 2024	Vienna, Austria	Gustavo Rodolfo Zlauvinen
Armenia	December 18, 2024	Vienna, Austria	Andranik Hovhannisyan
Australia	May 17, 2023	Vienna, Austria	Ian David Grainge Biggs
Azerbaijan	July 23, 2021	Vienna, Austria	Rovshan Sadigbayli
Bahamas		London, United Kingdom	Vacant
Bahrain	July 17, 2023	Geneva, Switzerland	Hasan Moosa Shafaei (Chargé d’Affaires a.i.)
Bangladesh	February 18, 2025	Vienna, Austria	Toufique Hasan
Barbados	January 15, 2024	Geneva, Switzerland	Matthew Anthony Wilson
Belarus	August 20, 2020	Vienna, Austria	Andrei Dapkiunas
Belgium	August 10, 2022	Vienna, Austria	Caroline Vermeulen
Belize		Vienna, Austria	Vacant
Benin		Vienna, Austria	Vacant
Bhutan	July 24, 2025	Geneva, Switzerland	Dechen Pelmo (Chargé d’Affaires a.i.)
Bolivia	April 17, 2025	Vienna, Austria	Ana Elizabeth Ferrel Alvarez (Minister/Counselor)
Bosnia and Herzegovina	July 4, 2023	Vienna, Austria	Sinisa Bencun
Botswana	July 10, 2018	Geneva, Switzerland	Athaliah Lesiba Molokomme
Brazil	July 11, 2025	Vienna, Austria	Eduardo Paes Saboia
Brunei	August 20, 2020	Berlin, Germany	Pengiran Hajah Krtini Pengiran Haji Tahir
Bulgaria	January 9, 2023	Vienna, Austria	Desislava Angelova Naydenova-Gospodinova
Burkina Faso	March 7, 2023	Vienna, Austria	Maimounata Ouattara
Burundi	January 3, 2024	Berlin, Germany	Annonciata Sendazirasa
Cambodia	November 19, 2025	Brussels, Belgium	Sovannary Kimsour
Cameroon	December 28, 2006	Berlin, Germany	James Gabche Nche (Minister/Counselor)
Canada	August 12, 2025	Vienna, Austria	Alison Grant
Cape Verde	January 15, 2024	Geneva, Switzerland	Clara Manuela da Luz Delgado Jesus
Central African Republic		Paris, France	Vacant
Chad	January 20, 2026	Berlin, Germany	Youssouf Abassalah
Chile	November 1, 2023	Vienna, Austria	Alex Wetzig
China	March 7, 2023	Vienna, Austria	Qi Mei
Colombia	January 30, 2026	Vienna, Austria	Marcela Tovar Thomas
Comoros		Unknown	Vacant
Congo	January 15, 2024	Berlin, Germany	Edith Antoinette Itoua
Costa Rica	December 18, 2024	Vienna, Austria	Olga Marta Sauma Uribe
Côte d'Ivoire	May 2, 2023	Vienna, Austria	Yacouba Cisse
Croatia	January 1, 2020	Vienna, Austria	Daniel Glunčić
Cuba	January 31, 2023	Vienna, Austria	Pablo Berti Oliva
Cyprus	December 1, 2023	Vienna, Austria	Vacant
Czech Republic	August 9, 2022	Vienna, Austria	Jiří Šitler
Democratic Republic of Congo		Berlin, Germany	Vacant
Denmark	September 1, 2022	Vienna, Austria	Christian Grønbech-Jensen
Djibouti	January 19, 2022	Berlin, Germany	Yacin Houssein Douale
Dominican Republic	December 19, 2023	Vienna, Austria	Angela Vigliotta Mella
Ecuador	January 23, 2026	Vienna, Austria	Cruskaya Elizabeth Moreano Cruz (Chargé d’Affaires a.i.)
Egypt	September 7, 2024	Vienna, Austria	Mohamed Ibrahim Nasr Salem
El Salvador	August 1, 2025	Vienna, Austria	Maria Jose Granadino (Chargé d’Affaires a.i.)
Equatorial Guinea	February 17, 2022	Berlin, Germany	Sisinio Eyebe Mbana Makina (Chargé d’Affaires a.i.)
Eritrea		Berlin, Germany	Yohannes Woldu (Chargé d’Affaires a.i.)
Estonia	October 2, 2025	Vienna, Austria	Arti Hilpus
Eswatini	September 29, 2022	Geneva, Switzerland	Vuyile Dumisani Dlamini
Ethiopia	February 20, 2024	Geneva, Switzerland	Tsegab Kebebew Daka
Finland	September 1, 2023	Vienna, Austria	Nina Irmeli Vaskunlahti
France	December 18, 2024	Vienna, Austria	Matthieu Nicolas Dominique Peyraud
Gabon	January 20, 2026	Berlin, Germany	Johanna Rose Mamiaka
Gambia	January 15, 2024	London, UK	Fatou Bensouda
Georgia	March, 2025	Vienna, Austria	Alexander Maisuradze
Germany	August 21, 2023	Vienna, Austria	Vito Cecere
Ghana	December 17, 2024	Vienna, Austria	Matilda Aku Alomatu
Greece	November 2, 2023	Vienna, Austria	Georgios Iliopoulos
Grenada	September 7, 2012	Brussels, Belgium	Kasandra Roxie Hutchinson
Guatemala	September 27, 2023	Vienna, Austria	Gabriel Orellana Zabalza
Guinea	April 3, 2024	Geneva, Switzerland	Louncény Condé
Guinea-Bissau		Berlin, Germany	Vacant
Guyana	July 30, 2021	Brussels, Belgium	Lloyd Gunraj (Chargé d'Affaires a.i.)
Haiti	September 1, 2024	Geneva, Switzerland	Ann-Kathryne Lassegue (Chargé d'Affaires a.i.)
Holy See	June 14, 2019	Vienna, Austria	Pedro Lopez Quintana
Honduras	November 14, 2022	Vienna, Austria	Elena María Freije Murillo
Hungary	September 5, 2023	Vienna, Austria	Edit Szilágyi-Bátorfi
Iceland	August 1, 2023	Vienna, Austria	Helga Hauksdóttir
India	April 18, 2024	Vienna, Austria	Shambhu Santha Kumaran
Indonesia	February 3, 2022	Vienna, Austria	Damos Dumoli Agusman
Iran	January 13, 2025	Vienna, Austria	Asadallah Eshragh Jahromi
Iraq	September 1, 2025	Vienna, Austria	Rahman Loan Muhsin Jothery (Chargé d'Affaires a.i.)
Ireland	August 14, 2024	Vienna, Austria	Barbara Cullinane
Israel	September 29, 2023	Vienna, Austria	David Roet
Italy	January 22, 2024	Vienna, Austria	Giovanni Pugliese
Jamaica		Geneva, Switzerland	Richard Jermaine Ian Brown
Japan	January 7, 2025	Vienna, Austria	Kiminori Iwama
Jordan	August 27, 2024	Vienna, Austria	Mohammed Hindawi
Kazakhstan	August 22, 2023	Vienna, Austria	Mukhtar Tileuberdi
Kenya	January 21, 2026	Vienna, Austria	Edwin Afande
Kiribati		Unknown	Vacant
Kosovo	October 31, 2023	Vienna, Austria	Albinot Bimbashi (Chargé d'Affaires a.i.)
Kuwait	August 3, 2022	Vienna, Austria	Talal S S S Alfassam
Kyrgyzstan	April 22, 2025	Vienna, Austria	Nurzhana Shaildabekova
Laos		Vienna, Austria	Khampheng Douangthongla
Latvia	September 17, 2025	Vienna, Austria	Ingrida Levrence
Lebanon	October 12, 2025	Vienna, Austria	Cynthia Chidiac
Lesotho	January 20, 2026	Berlin, Germany	Mafelili Christina Molala
Liberia	December 7, 2018	Berlin, Germany	Youngor Sevelee Telewoda
Libya	February 2, 2022	Vienna, Austria	Osama Abduljalil A Abdulhadi
Liechtenstein	September 1, 2025	Vienna, Austria	Simon Arthur Biedermann
Lithuania	October 20, 2022	Vienna, Austria	Lina Rukštelienė
Luxembourg	August 22, 2022	Vienna, Austria	Jean Graff
Madagascar		Falkensee, Germany	Vacant
Malawi	January 15, 2024	Geneva, Switzerland	Caroline Bwanali-Mussa
Malaysia	January 28, 2026	Vienna, Austria	Mohd Ridzwan Shahabudin (Chargé d'Affaires a.i.)
Maldives	March 10, 2026	Geneva, Switzerland	Salma Rasheed
Mali	March 10, 2026	Berlin, Germany	Cheick Mahamadou Cherif Keita
Malta	February 5, 2026	Vienna, Austria	Francesca Camilleri Vettiger
Mauritania	September 10, 2024	Berlin, Germany	Boubacar Kane
Mauritius	July 17, 2025	Berlin, Germany	Tanya Prayag Gujadhur (Chargé d'Affaires a.i.)
Mexico	December 18, 2023	Vienna, Austria	José Antonio Zabalgoitia Trejo
Moldova	September 3, 2024	Vienna, Austria	Victoria Roșa
Monaco	September 12, 2022	Berlin, Germany	Lorenzo Livio Maria Ravano
Mongolia	December 7, 2021	Vienna, Austria	Tsengeg Mikiddorj
Montenegro	March 24, 2024	Vienna, Austria	Stanica Anđić
Morocco	July 10, 2019	Vienna, Austria	Azzeddine Farhane
Mozambique	November 2, 2023	Berlin, Germany	Juliao Armando Langa (Chargé d'Affaires a.i.)
Myanmar	December 7, 2020	Vienna, Austria	Min Thein (Designate Ambassador)
Namibia	May 30, 2023	Vienna, Austria	Vasco Mushe Samupofu
Nepal	August 4, 2022	Vienna, Austria	Bharat Kumur Regmi
Netherlands	August 14, 2023	Vienna, Austria	Peter Potman
New Zealand	December 16, 2024	Vienna, Austria	Andrew Rive Williams
Nicaragua	July 5, 2021	Vienna, Austria	Sabra Amari Murillo Centeno
Niger	May 7, 2021	Geneve, Switzerland	Laouali Labo
Nigeria	April 16, 2025	Vienna, Austria	Muyiwa Waheed Onifade (Chargé d'Affaires a.i.)
North Korea	March 14, 2020	Vienna, Austria	Kang Il Choe
North Macedonia	February 26, 2026	Vienna, Austria	Hilda Kolevska (Chargé d'Affaires a.i.)
Norway	September 1, 2022	Vienna, Austria	Susan Eckey
Oman	January 7, 2019	Vienna, Austria	Yousuf Ahmed Hamed Al Jabri
Pakistan	June 27, 2024	Vienna, Austria	Mohammad Kamran Akhtar Malik
Palestine	October 22, 2013	Vienna, Austria	Salahaldin Abdalshafi
Panama	May 13, 2025	Vienna, Austria	Javier Enrique Caraballo Salazar
Paraguay	June 14, 2019	Vienna, Austria	Juan Francisco Facetti Fernandez
Peru		Vienna, Austria	María Eugenia Echeverría
Philippines	April 20, 2023	Vienna, Austria	Evangelina Lourdes Bernas
Poland	October 11, 2024	Vienna, Austria	Zenon Kosiniak-Kamysz
Portugal	August 6, 2025	Vienna, Austria	Jorge Manuel da Silva Lopes
Qatar	November 28, 2023	Vienna, Austria	Jassim Yaaqob al Hamadi
Romania	December 23, 2024	Vienna, Austria	Andrea Amza-András
Russia	November 23, 2025	Vienna, Austria	Andrey Grozov
Rwanda	November 7, 2025	Geneva, Switzerland	Urujeni Bakuramutsa
Samoa		Brussels, Belgium	Vacant
San Marino	September 17, 2008	Vienna, Austria	Elena Molaroni Berguido
Sao Tome and Principe		Brussels, Belgium	Vacant
Saudi Arabia	August 25, 2023	Vienna, Austria	Abdullah Khalid O. Tawlah
Senegal	July 3, 2025	Berlin, Germany	Moustapha Ndour
Serbia	December 14, 2023	Vienna, Austria	Marko Blagojević
Seychelles		Paris, France	Vacant
Sierra Leone	July 10, 2019	Berlin, Germany	M'Baimba Lamin Baryoh
Singapore	January 8, 2018	Singapore, Singapore	Heng Wing Chan
Slovakia	August 1, 2023	Vienna, Austria	Jozef Polakovič
Slovenia	August 1, 2025	Vienna, Austria	Marko Štucin
Somalia	Marach 21, 2025	Geneva, Switzerland	Khadra Ahmed Dualeh
South Korea	October 16, 2022	Vienna, Austria	Ham Sang-wook
Sovereign Military Order of Malta	April 16, 2018	Vienna, Austria	Sebastian Prinz von Schönaich-Carolath
South Africa	July 10, 2019	Vienna, Austria	Rapulane Sydney Molekane
South Sudan	September 1, 2014	Berlin, Germany	John Opiti Apiet (Minister)
Spain	April 2, 2024	Vienna, Austria	María Aurora Mejía Errasquín
Sri Lanka	January 31, 2026	Vienna, Austria	Wickrama Arachchige Don Ma Gunawardana (Chargé d’Affaires a.i.)
St. Vincent and the Grenadines	December 27, 2005	London, UK	Anne Morris (Minister/Counselor)
Sudan	July 28, 2022	Vienna, Austria	Magdi Ahmed Mofadal Elnour
Suriname		Brussels, Belgium	Vacant
Sweden	August 18, 2025	Vienna, Austria	Annika Ben David
Switzerland	December 1, 2022	Vienna, Austria	Salome Meyer
Syria	April 26, 2021	Vienna, Austria	Hasan Khaddour (Chargé d’Affaires a.i.)
Tajikistan	December 11, 2025	Vienna, Austria	Manuchehr Jobir
Tanzania	October 12, 2023	Vienna, Austria	Naimi Aziz
Thailand		Vienna, Austria	Pattarat Hongtong
Togo	November 6, 2024	Berlin, Germany	Cofie Séna Rodrigue Woussido (Chargé d’Affaires a.i.)
Trinidad and Tobago	November 8, 2019	Geneva, Switzerland	Allison St. Brice (Chargé d'Affaires a.i.)
Tunisia	January 8, 2024	Vienna, Austria	Samia Ilhem Ammar
Turkey	December 30, 2024	Vienna, Austria	Gürsel Dönmez
Turkmenistan	July 22, 2022	Vienna, Austria	Hemra Amannazarov
Uganda	August 1, 2022	Berlin, Germany	Stephen Mubiru
Ukraine	October 10, 2021	Vienna, Austria	Vasyl Khymynets
United Arab Emirates	September 30, 2025	Vienna, Austria	Shaikha Humood Shakhboot Alkaabi (Chargé d’Affaires a.i.)
United Kingdom	November 23, 2021	Vienna, Austria	Lindsey Samantha Skoll
United States	November 11, 2025	Vienna, Austria	Arthur Fisher
Uruguay	December 3, 2024	Vienna, Austria	Alejandro Garofali Acosta
Uzbekistan	October 25, 2023	Vienna, Austria	Bakhtiyor Ibragimov
Venezuela	December 18, 2024	Vienna, Austria	Claudia Salerno Caldera
Vietnam	December 18, 2024	Vienna, Austria	Vu Le Thai Hoang
Yemen	January 31, 2017	Vienna, Austria	Haytham Abdulmomen Hassan Shoja'Aadin
Zambia	January 21, 2025	Berlin, Germany	Winnie Natala Chibesakunda
Zimbabwe		Vienna, Austria	Vacant

== See also ==
- Foreign relations of Austria
- List of diplomatic missions of Austria
- List of diplomatic missions in Austria
