= Molokomme =

Molokomme is a surname, one of the well known surnames in South Africa and the neighboring Botswana. Notable people with the surname include:

- Athaliah Molokomme (born 1959), attorney general of Botswana, daughter of Imelda
- Imelda Molokomme, feminist activist from Botswana
- Lesiba Molokomme, born 1973. South African Politician and the Founder & President of CHANGE. He is a former radio journalist, talk show-host and producer. MD, Praise Media. A husband, father and a staunch Christian.
