= Public Prosecutor's Office (Kurdistan Region) =

- Kurdish: سەرۆکایەتیی داواکاری گشتی; Serokayetîy Daxwazî Giştî

Agency overview
- Jurisdiction: Kurdistan Region
- Agency executive: Kawa Fathi Masoum, Public Prosecutor General

The Public Prosecutor's Office (Kurdish: سەرۆکایەتیی داواکاری گشتی, romanized: Serokayetîy Daxwazî Giştî) is the agency for conducting prosecution, protecting the rights of citizens in courts, and safeguarding the rule of law in the Kurdistan Region of Iraq (KRI).

The Public Prosecutor in the Kurdistan Region reviews and audits case files, oversees investigations and ensures legal procedures are followed, visits police and security stations as well as centres for combating domestic violence, inspects detention and correctional facilities to assess conditions and hear complaints, and appeals court decisions when necessary.

The office maintains partnerships and receives funding and training from the United Nations Development Programme, the U.S. Bureau of International Narcotics and Law Enforcement Affairs, the European Union, the German Federal Foreign Office, the International Nuremberg Principles Academy, and the Kurdish Centre for International Law (KCIL).

Judge Kawa Fathi Masoum was appointed as the Public Prosecutor General of the Kurdistan Region on February 13, 2023.

== See also ==
- Kurdistan Judicial Council
