= Rafti =

Rafti or RAFTI may refer to:

- Elena Rafti, Cypriot diplomat
- Porto Rafti, Greek town
- RAFTI, Rapidly Attachable Fluid Transfer Interface, interface for transferring fluids
