= Palace of Justice, Nuremberg =

Courthouse complex in Nuremberg, Germany

Palace of Justice
- Justizpalast
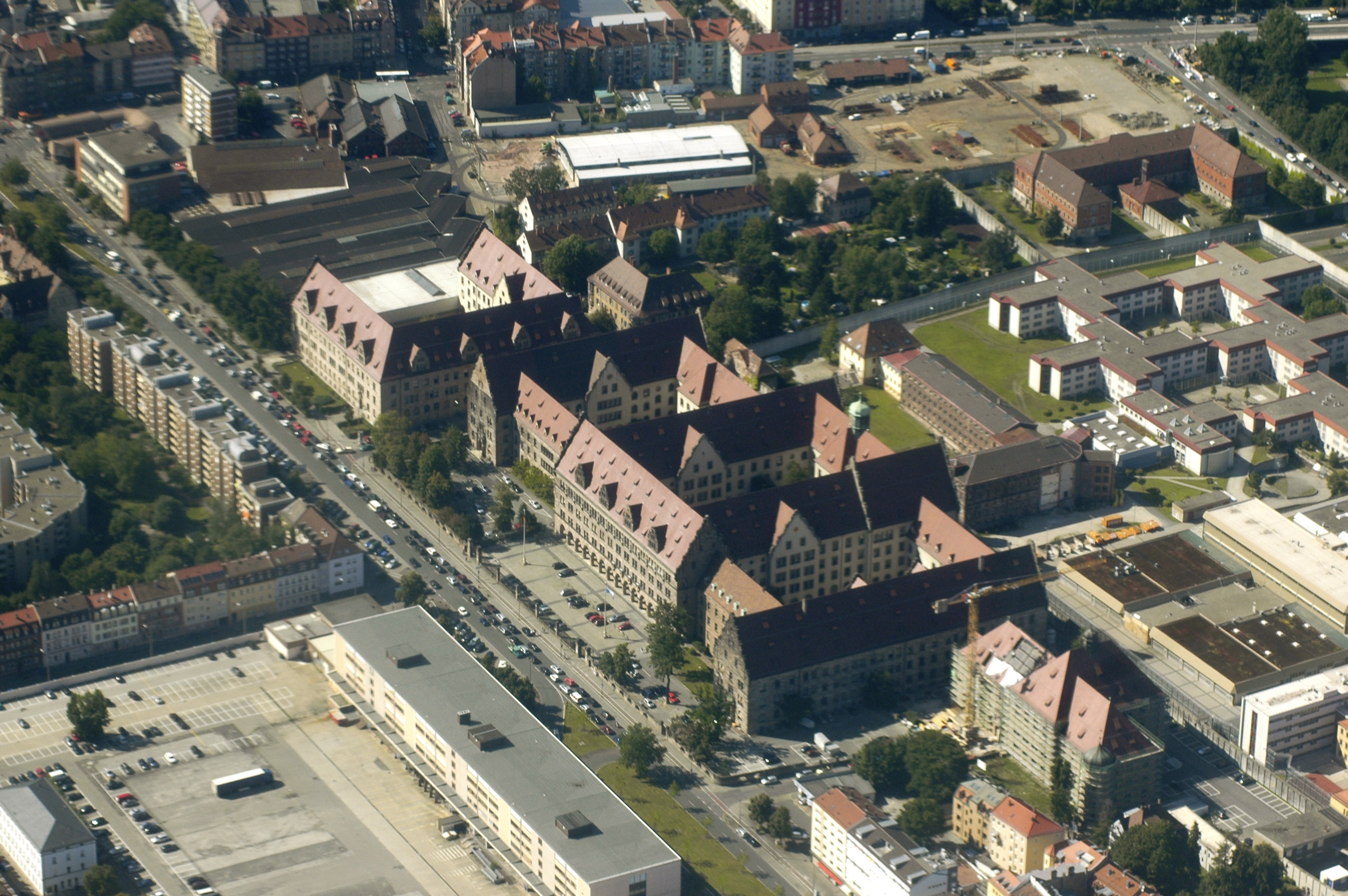
- Aerial view, 2009
- Interactive map of the Palace of Justice area

General information
- Location: Fuerther Str. 110, 90429, Nuremberg, Bavaria, Germany
- Coordinates: 49.4549°N 11.0465°E
- Construction started: 1909
- Estimated completion: 1916

Design and construction
- Architect: Paul Pfann
- Known for: Location of the Nuremberg Trials

Website
- museums.nuernberg.de/memorium-nuremberg-trials/

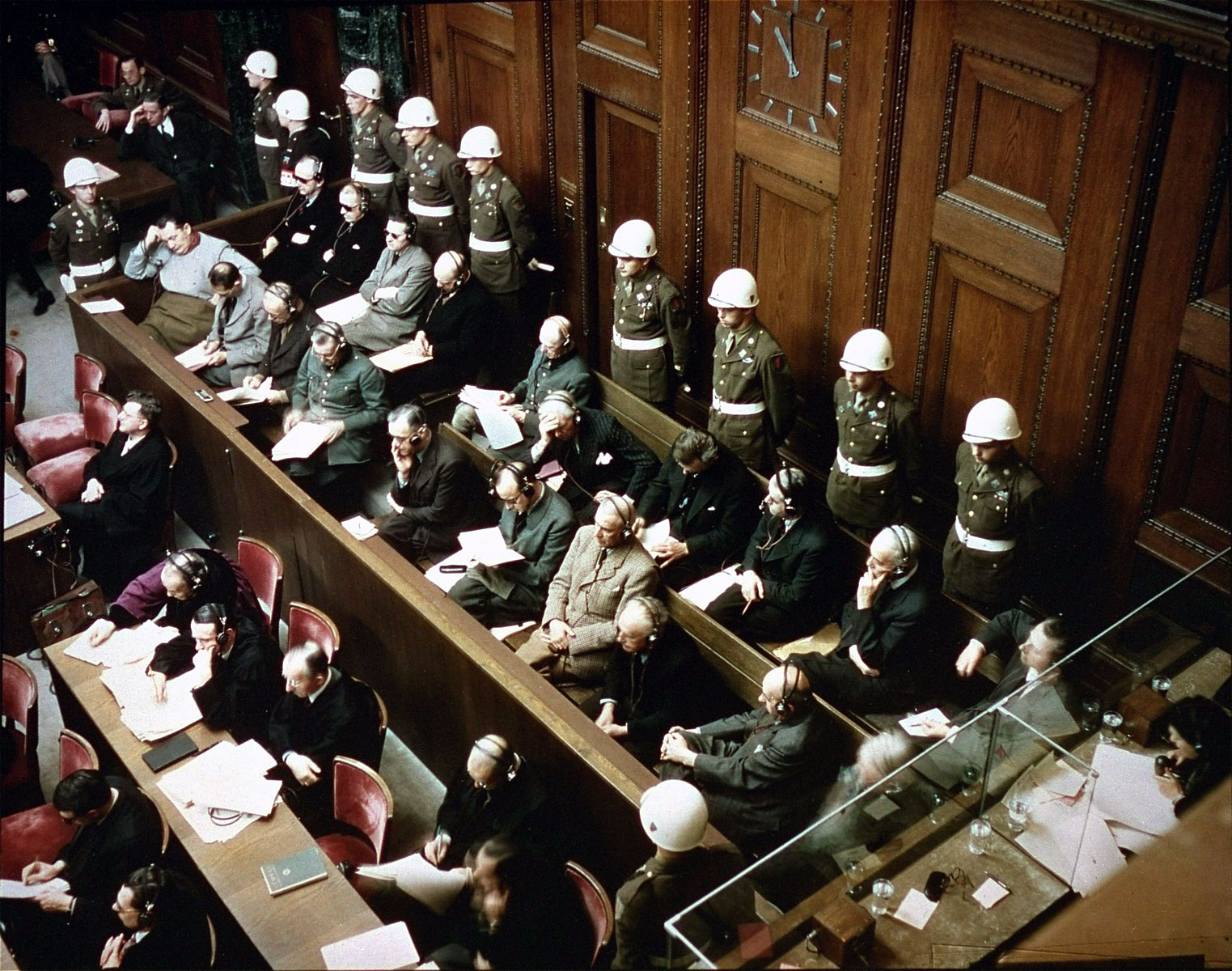
Nuremberg Trials at courtroom 600, November 1945

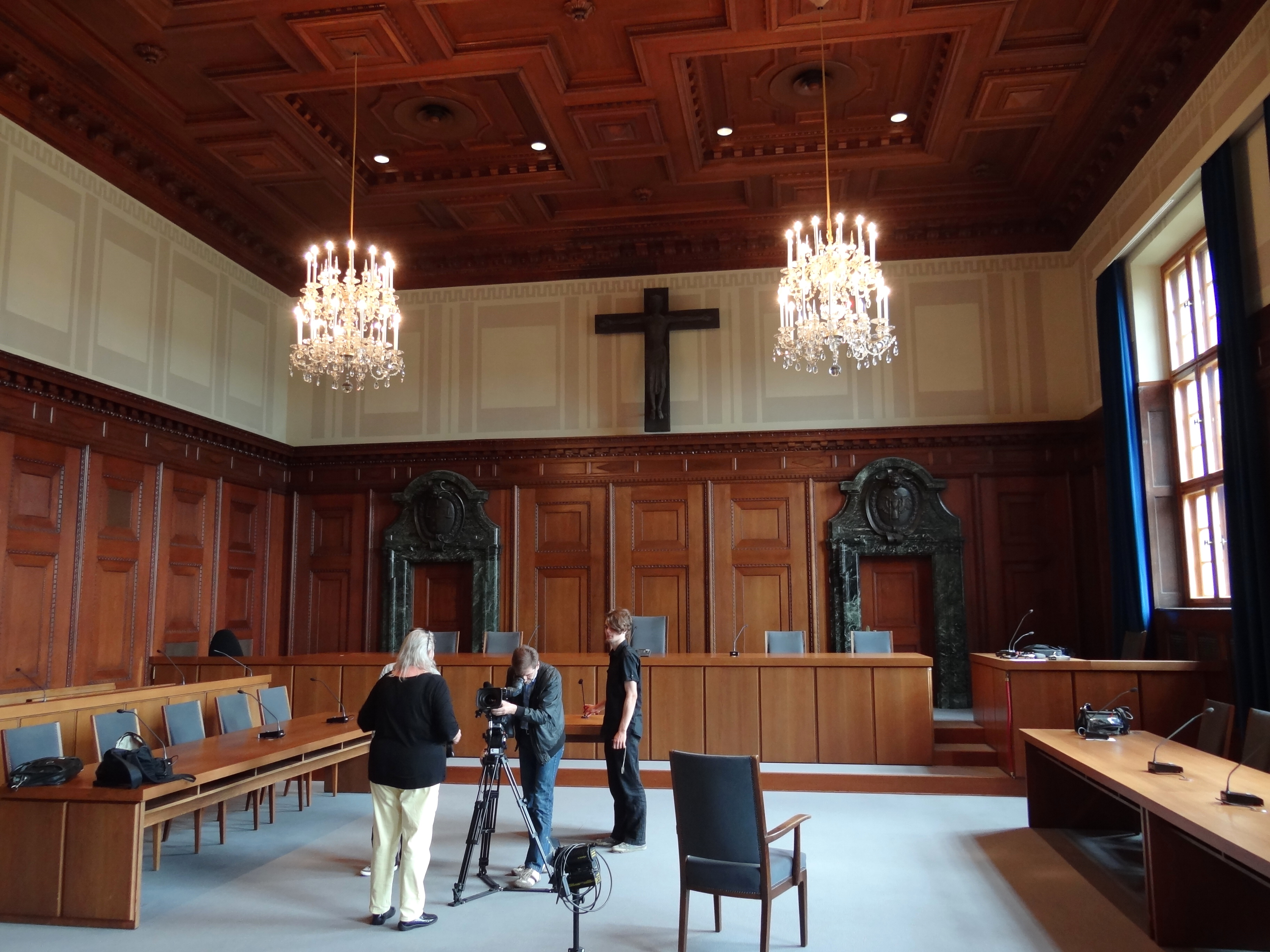
Courtroom 600 in 2012

The Nuremberg Palace of Justice (German: Justizpalast) is a building complex in Nuremberg, Bavaria, Germany. It was constructed from 1909 to 1916 and houses the appellate court (Oberlandesgericht), the regional court (Landgericht), the local court (Amtsgericht) and the public prosecutor's office (Staatsanwaltschaft). The Nuremberg Trials Memorial (Memorium Nürnberger Prozesse) is located on the top floor of the courthouse. The International Nuremberg Principles Academy has been housed on the ground floor of the east wing since 2020.

== Nuremberg trials ==
The building was chosen as the location of the Nuremberg trials (1945–1949) for the main surviving German war criminals of World War II because it had survived the war in relatively good condition despite severe bombing raids, was large enough, and included a large prison complex. The choice of the city of Nuremberg was also symbolic as the Nazi Party had held its large Nuremberg rallies in the city.

Beginning in 2000, courtroom 600 could be visited by tourists on weekends. It was still used for court hearings until 2020, since when criminal trials of Nuremberg-Fürth Regional Court have been held in modern courtrooms constructed on the west side of the complex.

In 2010, Courtroom 600 was rebuilt as the Nuremberg Trials Memorial, sponsored by the Nuremberg Municipal Museums. Since 2022, a media installation creates a virtual illusion of the courtroom at the time of the Nuremberg trials.
