= Paul Pfann =

German architect (1860–1919)

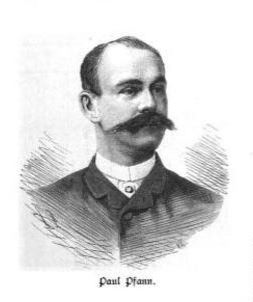
Paul Pfann; portrait from the Illustrirte Zeitung (1889)

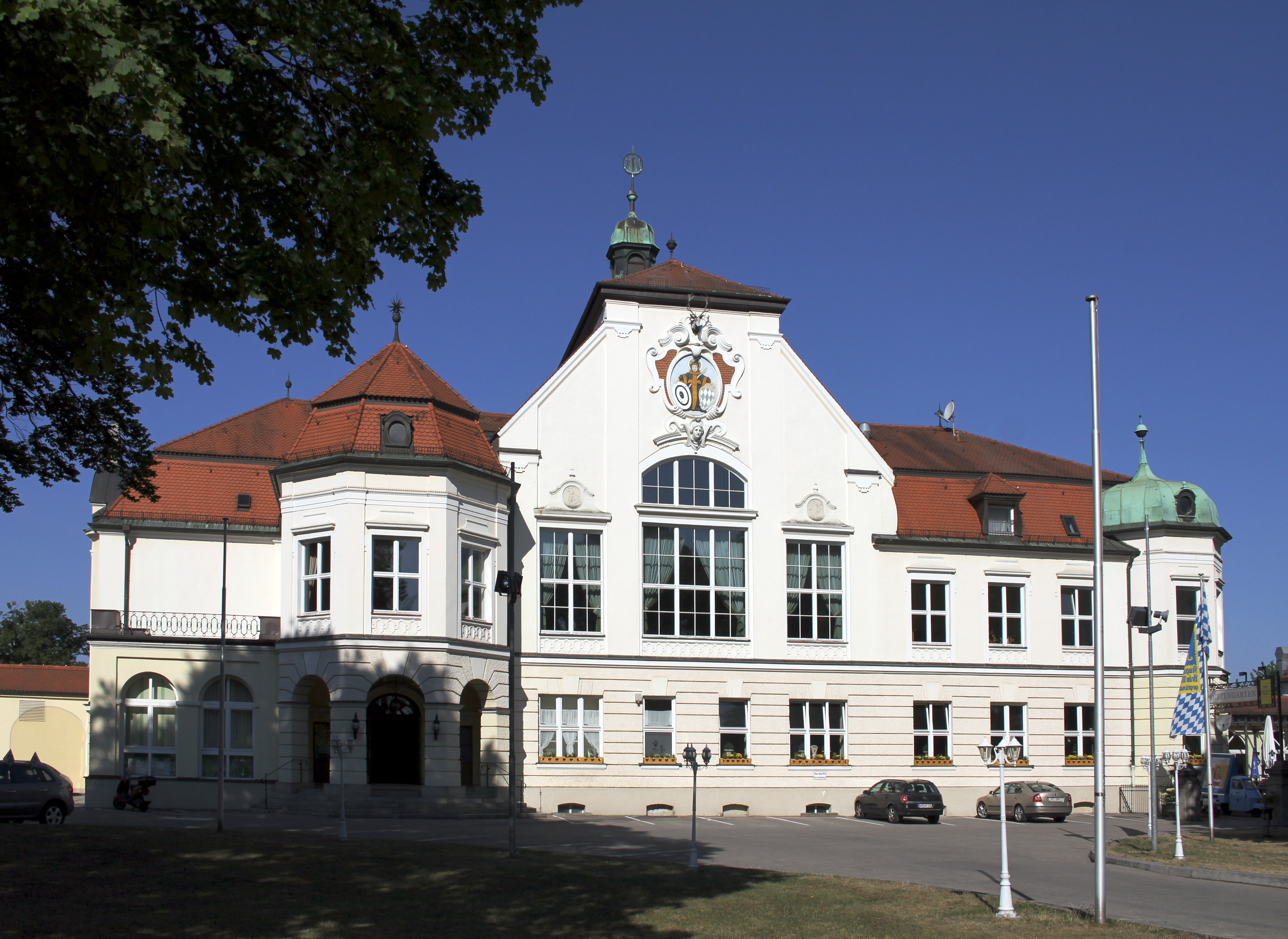
Shooting Range of the HSG

Paul Pfann (18 April 1860, Nuremberg - 1 August 1919, Nuremberg) was a German architect in the Historicist style. He was also a professor at the Technical University of Munich.

== Life and work ==
His father was a primary school teacher. From 1879 to 1883, he studied architecture at the Technical University of Munich with Friedrich von Thiersch and Paul Wallot. He would spend most of his career in Munich and often worked in collaboration with Günther Blumentritt. From 1884 to 1887, he also collaborated with the architectural firm of Arwed Roßbach, in Leipzig. From 1887 to 1891, he assisted Paul Wallot during the construction of the Reichstag building in Berlin. In 1890, he entered a competition to design the National Kaiser Wilhelm Monument.

From 1891 to 1892, he served as an assistant Professor for freehand drawing at the Technical University, and from 1893 was a Privatdozent for sketching from nature. From 1900 to 1908 he was "professor without chair" for drawing, decorative architecture and perspective. In 1908, he became a full professor.

His most familiar buildings include the Shooting Range of the HSG Munich (1892-1894) in Sendling-Westpark, the headquarters of the French Consulate General in Bogenhausen (1896-1897) and the east wing of the Palace of Justice, Nuremberg (1909-1916).

== Sources ==
- Biography and drawings @ the University of Heidelberg
- Katharina Blohm, Architekturschule München 1868-1993: 125 Jahre Technische Universität München, Klinkhardt + Biermann, 1993 ISBN 978-3-7814-0350-5 (Google Books)
