= Elena Rafti =

Cypriot ambassador

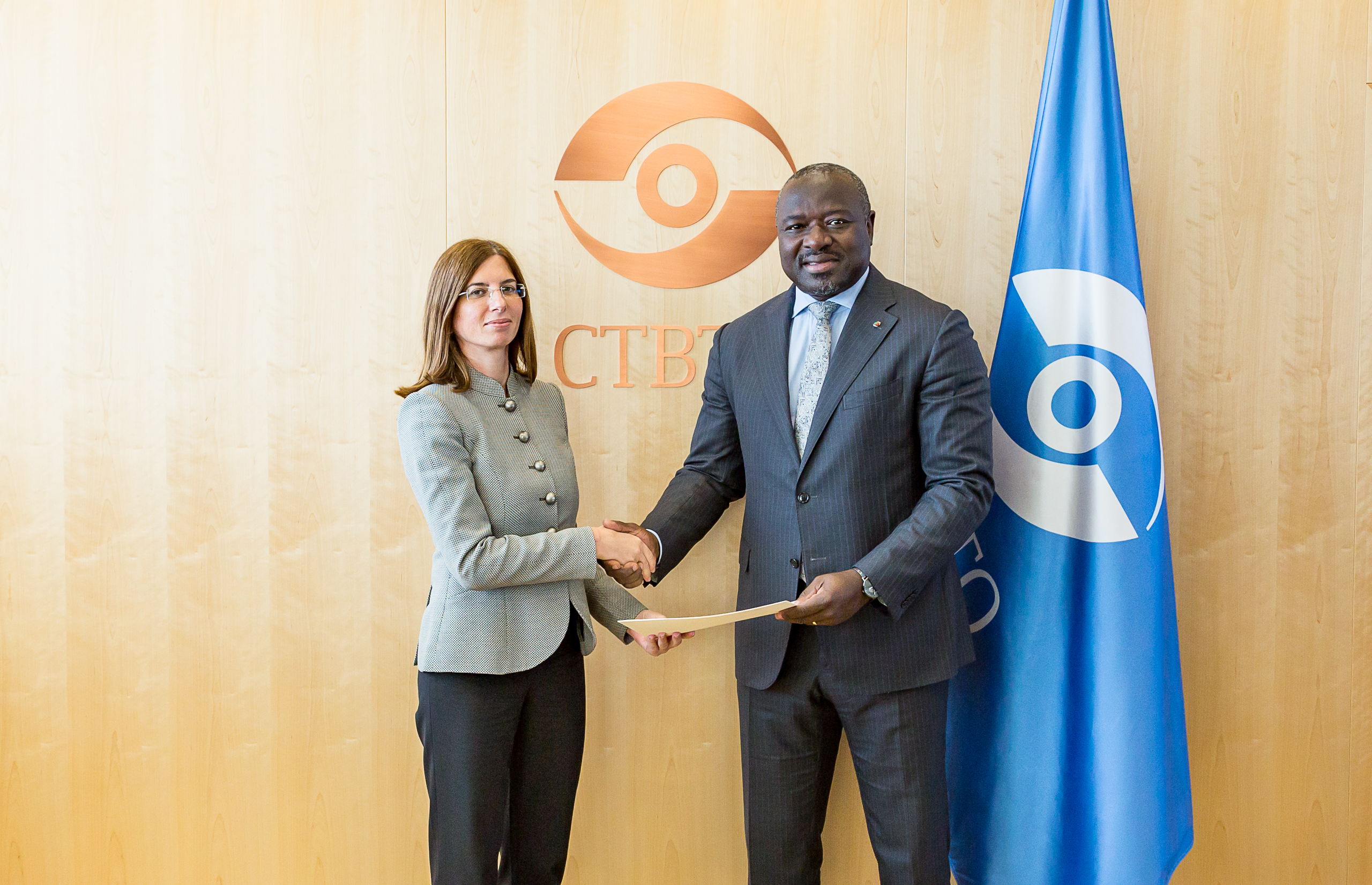
Elena Rafti (43458593384)

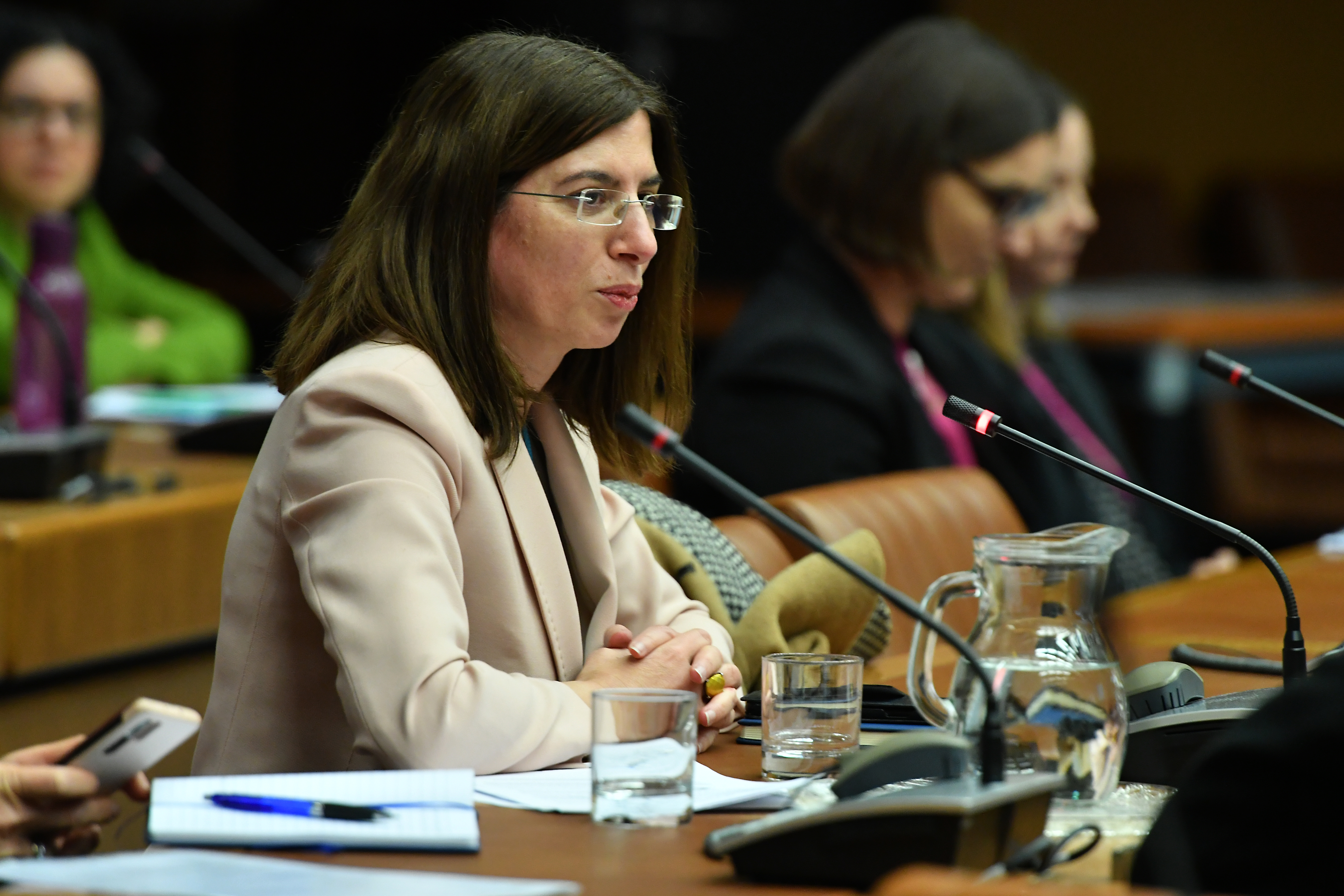
HE Ms Elena Rafti (01313866) (49622002266)

Elena Rafti is the Cypriot Ambassador to Austria. She presented her credentials on 7 July 2018. On 17 August 2018 she presented her credentials for the position of the International Anti-Corruption Academy. She has also served, at the same time, as the non-resident Ambassador to Slovenia and is the Cypriot Ambassador/permanent representative to the permanent mission to the United Nations in Vienna.
