= Kurdistan Region Judicial Council =

Highest judicial authority in the Kurdistan Region of Iraq

- Kurdish: ئەنجوومەنی دادوەریی کوردستان; Arabic: مجلس القضاء إقليم كردستان العراق; Encûmena Dadwerîy Kurdistan

Agency overview
- Formed: 1992
- Jurisdiction: Kurdistan Region
- Headquarters: Erbil, Kurdistan Region, Iraq
- Agency executive: Abduljabar Aziz Hassan, Head of the KRJC
- Website: krjc.org

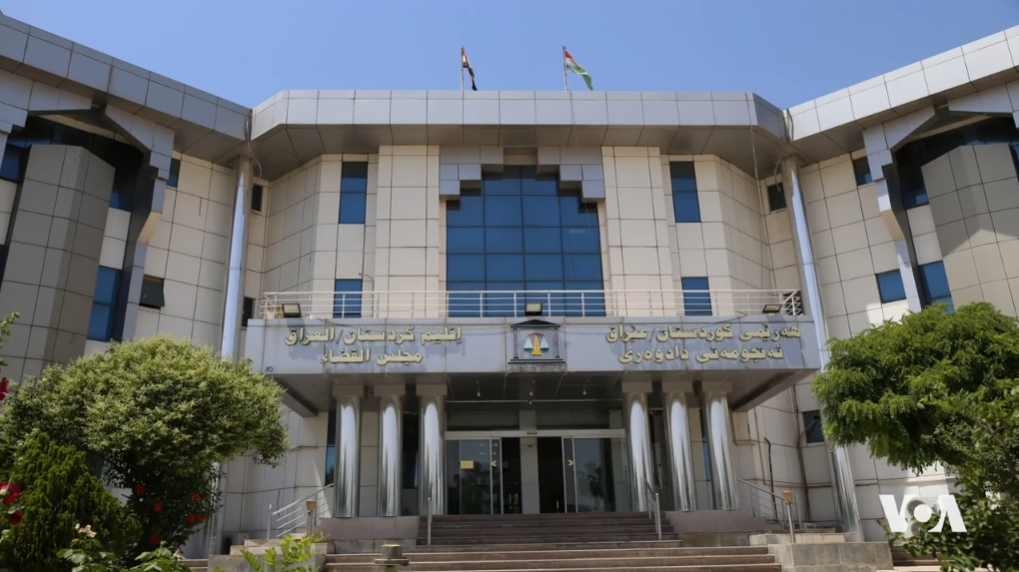
Entrance to the main building of the Kurdistan Region Judicial Council in Erbil.

The Kurdistan Region Judicial Council (KRJC) (Kurdish: ئەنجوومەنی دادوەریی کوردستان, romanized: Encûmena Dadwerîy Kurdistan; Arabic: مجلس القضاء إقليم كردستان العراق) is the highest judicial authority in the Kurdistan Region of Iraq (KRI). Several lower-level appellate courts exist throughout the KRI, including in Duhok, Erbil, Sulaymaniyah, and Kirkuk-Garmiyan (Note: Kirkuk is claimed by KRI and is a disputed territory, since it does not have administrative authority in Kirkuk, the appellate court is based in Garmian, see إدارة كرميان) It is part of the Supreme Judicial Council of Iraq.

== History ==
The KRJC was established in 1992 under Judicial Authority Law No. 14 passed by the Kurdistan Region Parliament, when the Kurdistan Region achieved de facto autonomy.

During the Kurdish Civil War, the KJC functioned as the court for both the Kurdistan Democratic Party (KDP) and Patriotic Union of Kurdistan (PUK) areas until 1998, when the PUK established its own Supreme Court in Sulaymaniyah. However, the judiciary was reunified in 2006.

In 2009, the Kurdistan Region Parliament enacted Law No. 7 on Judicial Institutions, re-establishing the KRJC and assigning it responsibility for selecting judges and prosecutors in the KRI. Since then, the judicial institution has operated with three levels of appeal. As of 2021, 148 judges and prosecutors had graduated from the institution, and 195 judges currently serve in the region's courts.

== Judicial independence ==
Under Law No. 23 of 2007, the KRJC is intended to be administratively and financially independent from the executive branch. For example, its chief justice is to be selected by the judges, while the judges are to be appointed by the Kurdistan Region Parliament, in line with principles found in the Iraqi constitution.

However, analysts and organizations such as the Tahrir Institute for Middle East Policy note that the judiciary faces significant challenges. Many provisions of Law No. 23 of 2007 have not been fully implemented, contributing to perceptions of politicization. Over time, the KDP and PUK have expanded their influence within the KRJC, with judges reportedly appointed by the Prime Minister rather than the Kurdistan Region Parliament. The chief justice has also been appointed and sworn in by the Prime Minister, and many judges are considered to be affiliated with one of the two dominant parties.

== See also ==
- Public Prosecutor's Office (Kurdistan Region)
