= Athaliah Molokomme =

Attorney General of Botswana (born 1959)

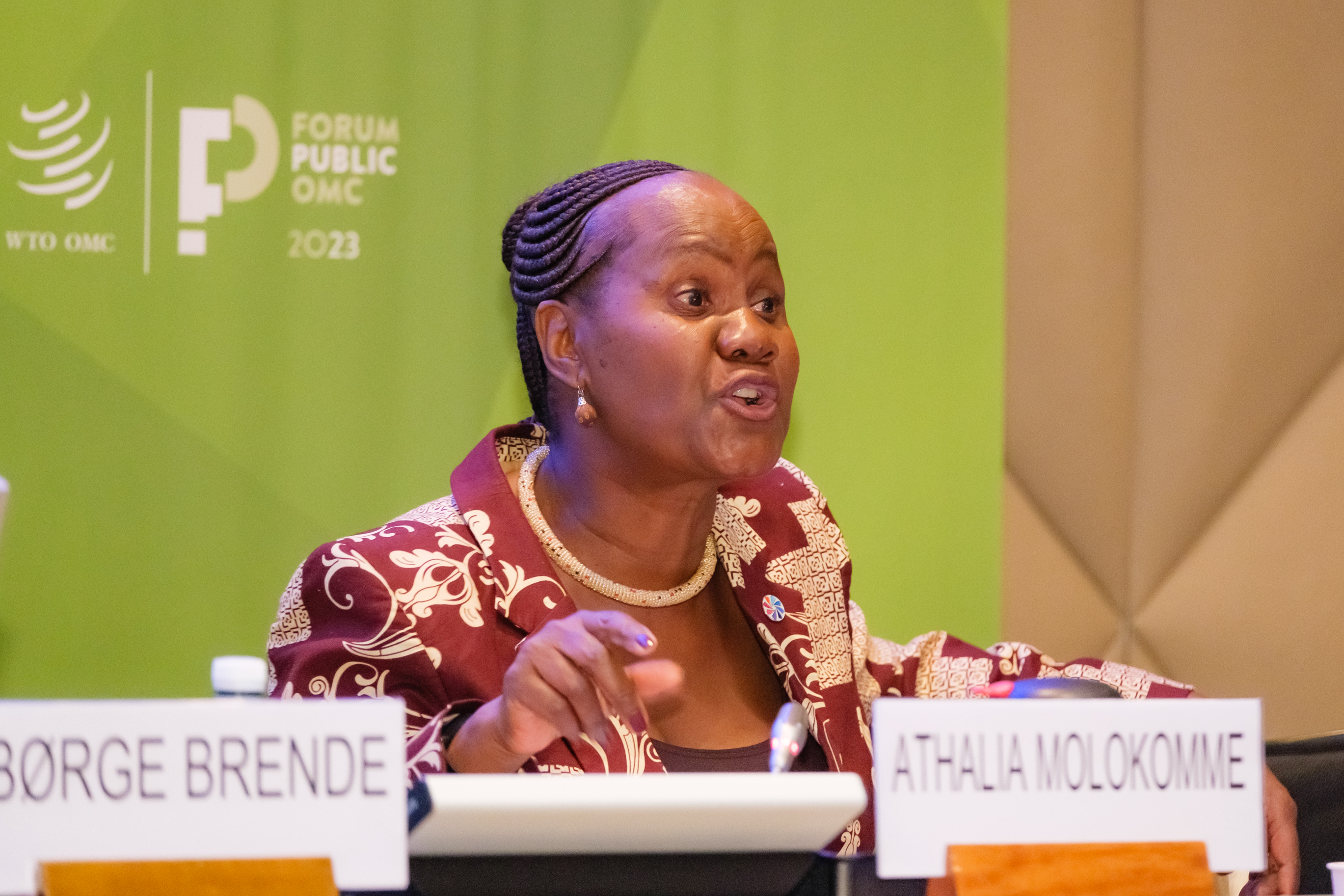
- Molokomme in 2023

Personal details
- Born: 4 December 1959 (age 66) Francistown, Botswana
- Education: University of Botswana, Swaziland

Athaliah Molokomme was the attorney general of Botswana until 2017 and is the first woman to hold that position. Molokomme has been committed to advocacy for women's rights at conferences, workshops, and seminars around the world. Dr. Athaliah Molokomme was appointed as Permanent Representative of Botswana to the UN in Geneva and Ambassador to Switzerland in May 2018.

== Early life and education ==
Athaliah Maoka Lesiba Molokomme was born on 4 December 1959 in Francistown, Botswana. She was the second of nine children born to teachers Imelda Mishodzi Molokomme and Rufus Oka Kabiwa Molokomme.

Molokomme holds degrees from the University of Botswana and Swaziland. In 1983, she obtained a master's degree in law from Yale Law School in the United States. She also obtained a PhD in law from Leiden University. Her thesis, Children of the Fence: The maintenance of extra-marital children under law and practice in Botswana, was published soon after.

== Education ==
She has a Bachelor of Laws from the university of Botswana and Swaziland; a Masters in Law from Yale Law School, USA and a Doctorate in Law from Leiden University, the Netherlands. She attained a Diploma in International Commercial Arbitration from the Chartered Institute of Arbitrators, London. She was a senior lecturer at the University of Botswana from 1981 to 1996.

== Career ==
Molokomme has worked as a politician and a professor. Between 1981 and 1996, she taught law as a senior lecturer at the University of Botswana, and has researched and published extensively in the fields of family law, women and law, customary law and employment law.

Since the 1990s Molokomme has been a regular speaker at national, regional and international conferences, workshops and seminars in her areas of expertise.

She is a founding member of several organisations, such as Emang Basadi, Women and Law in Southern Africa (WLSA), and Women, Law and Development International (WLDI).

From July 1998, she was the founding head of the Gender Unit at the Secretariat of the Southern African Development Community, where she was an advisor on gender issues and developed policies and programmes on the empowerment of women and gender mainstreaming, until May 2003 when she was appointed a judge of the High Court of Botswana.

She later served as a co-chair of the World Trade Organisation's Trade and Gender Informal Working Group with Einar Gunnarson and Ana Patricia Benedetti Zelaya. She had stepped down by 2023 when Simon Manley and Clara Manuela da Luz Delgado Jesus joined as co-chairs of the Working Group.

She was the first female attorney general of Botswana in 2005. In April 2014 it was expected that Molokomme would resign from her position as attorney general to contest the presidency of the International Criminal Court Assembly of State Parties, but she did not resign.

Molokomme is an active member of the Justice Leadership Initiative. Ambassador and Permanent Representative of Botswana to the UN and other International Organizations in Geneva.

“In Setswana, we say ‘go ruta mosadi ke go ruta sechaba’ meaning that ‘to educate a woman is to educate a nation’.” - Athaliah Molokomme, Speech at the Embassy of France, The Hague, 10 March 2014 on International Women's Day.

She serves on several Boards including the Africa Group on Justice and Accountability; the Advisory Council of the International Nuremberg Principles Academy; the Justice Leadership Group and Justice Rapid Response.

== Publications ==
- Molokomme, A. and Takirambudde P. N. (1994). The New Labour Law in Botswana
- Molokomme, A. (1991). " Children of the fence": the maintenance of extra-marital children under law and practice in Botswana (No. 46). African Studies Centre. ISBN 90-70110-91-1
- Molokomme, A. (1990). Disseminating family law reforms: Some lessons from Botswana. The Journal of Legal Pluralism and Unofficial Law, 23(30-31), 303–329. doi:10.1080/07329113.1990.10756432
- Molokomme, A. (1989).The multi-party system in Botswana
- Molokomme, A. and Kethusegile B. M. Sadc Gender Monitor
- Molokomme, A. (1986). Custom, Law and Ethnicity: Effects on the Status of Women in Botswana. Canadian Woman Studies.

== Honors and awards ==
Among the awards she has received are the Women's Human Rights Award from Women, Law and Development International in 1993, and the Presidential Order of Meritorious Service for Exceptional Service to Botswana in 1999.

== See also ==
- First women lawyers around the world
