= Jiří Šitler =

Czech diplomat and historian

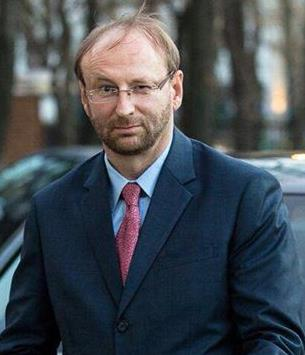
Jiří Šitler in Stockholm as Ambassador of the Czech Republic

Jiří Šitler (born 22 December 1964) is a Czech diplomat and historian. Since 2022, he is Ambassador Extraordinary and Plenipotentiary of the Czech Republic in Vienna, Austria.

== Biography ==
Šitler was born on December 22, 1964, in the statutory city of Hradec Králové, located in north-eastern Bohemia at the confluence of the Elbe and the Orlice rivers. He is married and has two children.

When he is not on a diplomatic mission and on home leave, he lives with his wife Gabriela Irina, their daughter Alexandra and their son Jan Adam in Všestary, a municipality and village about seven kilometres to the west of Hradec Králové.

== Education ==
Šitler attended the Faculty of Philosophy at Charles University in Prague, where he graduated in history, May 1988. In April 1990, he obtained a doctoral degree in history, also at Charles University in Prague.

He also gave lectures and spent time at several research stays (at the Catholic University of Eichstätt-Ingolstadt and LMU Munich in 1992–1993) in Germany; Italy, State Archives Venice and University of Perugia (1990, 1991, 1992); USA, German Marshall Fellowship, Woodrow Wilson Foundation Program (1995, 1996); United Kingdom, Chevening Scholarship, Thai studies at the School of African and Oriental Studies in London (1997); lectures and seminars on Czech foreign policy at Charles University, Prague (1996-2001).

Šitler is a founding member of the Board of Trustees of the German Federal Foundation “Remembrance, Responsibility and Future”. Moreover, he is the author or co-author of numerous essays, articles and books, especially on Czech-German relations, World War II – related issues, Czech political history and South-East Asian history.

== Early career ==
After graduating from Charles University, Šitler started his professional career at the Central Archives of the Academy of Sciences (September 1988 – January 1992). Soon after, he went on to work in the Office of the President of the Republic, Václav Havel, in the Press Department (March 1993 – January 1995). For the next two years (February 1995 – June 1997), Šitler worked in the Foreign Policy Department of the Office of the President, and in parallel, he served as an Advisor for President Havel’s speeches.

== Diplomatic career ==
Šitler started his career in the Ministry of Foreign Affairs of the Czech Republic in July 1997, as Deputy Director of the 1st Territorial Department. In September 1998 he was appointed Director of the Central Europe Department, a position which he occupied until September 2000, when he was designated Ambassador at Large (Special Envoy on World War II-Related Issues). From this position, Šitler has conducted negotiations with Germany, Austria and the US on compensation for forced labour and other Nazi war crimes. In addition to being the chief negotiator of the Czech government, he was also a representative of the International Commission on Holocaust Era Insurance Claims (ICHEIC). During that period, Šitler also chaired the Working Group for the Summarization of Property Wrongs within the Mixed Commission Dealing with the Mitigation of Certain Property Wrongs suffered by Holocaust Victims (presided over by the Deputy Prime Minister Pavel Rychetský).

He was later appointed Ambassador Extraordinary and Plenipotentiary of the Czech Republic to the Kingdom of Thailand, the Kingdom of Cambodia, the Lao PDR and the Union of Myanmar/Burma. Šitler' s mission began in May 2001 and ended in December 2006.

He returned to the headquarters of the Ministry of Foreign Affairs in Prague, as Director of Diplomatic Protocol (December 2006 – November 2007), followed by a position as Director of the Asia and Pacific Department (April 2008 – October 2010). In between, Šitler represented the Czech Republic as special envoy on Myanmar/Burma (December 2007 – March 2008).

Between November 2010 and January 2015, he was Ambassador of the Czech Republic to Bucharest, Romania.

Between March 2015 and January 2016 he was designated by the Ministry of Foreign Affairs of the Czech Republic as Special Envoy for Holocaust Issues and Combat of Antisemitism. He has dealt with World War II-related issues since the 1990s, having served in such offices as press and foreign policy advisor to President Václav Havel (1993–1997), head of the Czech delegation at the 1998 Washington Conference on Holocaust Era Assets, observer in the International Commission on Holocaust Era Insurance Claims, Ambassador-at-Large for World War II - related issues, and chief negotiator for compensation of Czech Nazi victims.

He was Ambassador of the Czech Republic in Stockholm from February 2016 to August 2020.

== Honours ==
=== National honours ===
- Czech Republic: Recipient of the Medal of Honour of the Czech Union of Freedom Fighters
- Czech Republic: Recipient of the Medal of the Union of Forced Labourers

=== Foreign honours ===
- (Romania) Romanian Royal Family:
  - 59th Knight of the Royal Decoration of the Cross of the Romanian Royal House
- Thailand:
  - Knight Grand Cross of the Order of the White Elephant
  - Second Class of the Red Cross Medal of Appreciation

== Publications ==
- Kaiser, Daniel – Šitler, Jiří, Novodobé české dějiny v zrcadle Frankfurter Allgemeine Zeitung (Modern Czech History in the Mirror of Frankfurter Allgemeine Zeitung) In: Dějiny a současnost. Populární historická a vlastivědná revue. Praha : Nakladatelství Lidové noviny 18, č. 5, (1996,) s. 15-19.
- Hon, Jan – Šitler, Jiří, Trestněprávní důsledky událostí v období německé nacistické okupace Československa a v době těsně po jejím skončení a jejich řešení (Criminal Justice System´s Response to the Consequences of the German Nazi Occupation and its Aftermath) In: Studie o sudetoněmecké otázce / Praha : Ústav mezinárodních vztahů, 1996 s. 165-176.
- Šitler, Jiří, Cenzura v předlistopadovém Československu (Censorship in Czechoslovakia before November 1989). In: Dějiny a současnost. Kulturně historická revue. Praha: Nakladatelství Lidové noviny 20, č. 6, (1998,) s. 33-38.
- Šitler, Jiří, Království Sukhothai čili Andělé a ďábli v thajském sporu o rukopisy a nápisy (Kingdom of Sukhothai or Angels and Devils in the Thai Manuscripts and Inscriptions Controversy). In: Dějiny a současnost. Kulturně historická revue. 22, č. 4, (2000,) s. 20-25
- Miroslav Nožina, Jiří Šitler, et al., Siam Undiscovered. Czech-Thai Encounters between the 16th and 21st Centuries. Bangkok 2004
- Miroslav Nožina, Jiří Šitler, and Karel Kučera, Royal Ties: King Norodom Sihamoni and the History of Czech-Cambodian Relations. Prague, Knižní klub, 2006. ISBN 978-80-86938-75-2
- Šitler, Jiří, Československé reparační nároky a konfiskace německého majetku (Czechoslovak Reparation Claims and Confiscation of German Property). In: Marek Loužek (ed.), Česko-německá deklarace. Deset let poté. Prague, 2007, published by CEP
- Šitler, Jiří, History of International Discussions on Compensations to Victims of Nazism as Seen by Delegations Representing Central and Eastern European Countries. In: Holocaust Era Assets: Conference Proceedings, Prague, 2009, published by Forum 2000 Foundation, pp. 291 – 295 and 1202 - 1209

== Publications about J. Šitler ==
- Hořák, Martin (ed.), Compensation 2000 – 2006. The Czech-German Fund for the Future and Payments to Victims of Slave Labour and Forced Labour. Prague 2007
- Goschler, Constantin (Hrsg.), Die Entschädigung von NS-Zwangsarbeit am Anfang des 21. Jahrhunderts. Bd. 3: Nationale Selbstbilder, Opferdiskurse und Verwaltungshandeln. Das Auszahlungsprogramm in Ostmitteleuropa. Göttingen : Wallstein Verlag 2012 ISBN 978-3-8353-1085-8, 246 pp.
- Mink, Andreas, Challenging "Wiedergutmachung". The Slave Labor Negotiations of 1998-2001, Ústav mezinárodních vztahů (Institute for International relations), Prague 2013, 127 pp., ISBN 9788087558072
