= Rapu Molekane =

South African diplomat (born 1961)

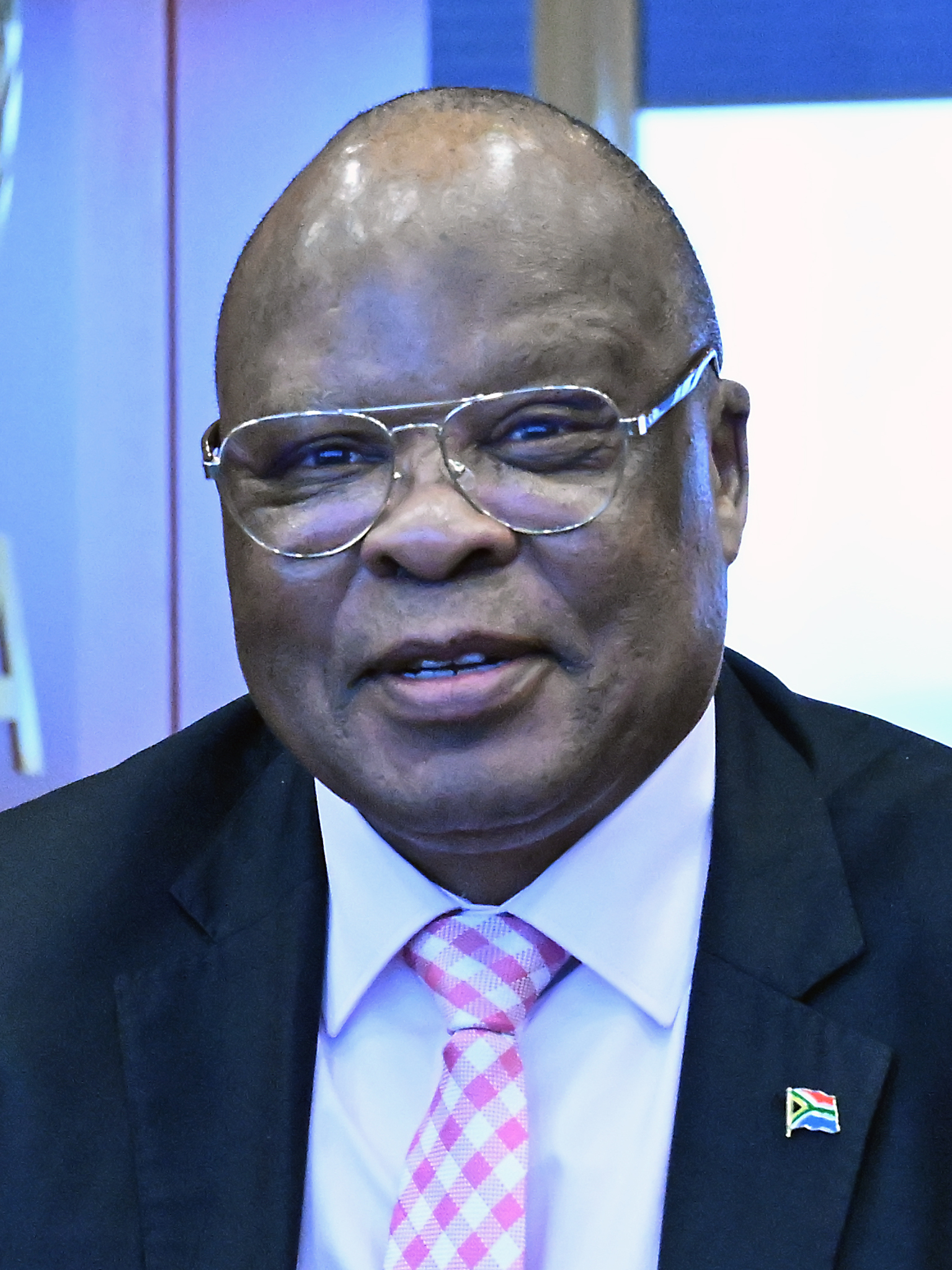
- Molekane at the International Atomic Energy Agency in Vienna, 2024

Member of the National Assembly
- In office May 1994 – June 1999

Secretary-General of the African National Congress Youth League
- In office 1990–1994
- President: Peter Mokaba
- Preceded by: Position re-established
- Succeeded by: Mpho Lekgoro

Personal details
- Born: Rapulane Sydney Molekane; 7 May 1961 (age 65) White City, Soweto; Transvaal, South Africa
- Party: African National Congress

Rapulane Sydney Molekane (born 7 May 1961) is a South African diplomat, politician, and former anti-apartheid activist. He has been South African Ambassador to Austria since 2019. In that capacity, he also has non-resident accreditation to Slovenia and Slovakia and serves as South Africa's permanent representative to various international organisations in Vienna.

During apartheid, Molekane rose to political prominence as a leading figure in the students' movement in Soweto. A member of the United Democratic Front, he was president of the Soweto Youth Congress from 1984 to 1985 and founding general-secretary of the South African Youth Congress from 1987 to 1990. From 1990 to 1994, he was secretary-general of the newly relaunched African National Congress (ANC) Youth League under league president Peter Mokaba.

Molekane represented the ANC in the National Assembly during the first democratic Parliament from 1994 to 1999. Since becoming a career diplomat in 1999, he has served as Consul-General in Germany, High Commissioner to Ghana, and Ambassador to France.

== Early life and activism ==
Molekane was born on 7 May 1961 in White City, a neighbourhood of Jabavu in Soweto. His native language is Setswana; his father belonged to the Barolong ba Rapulane of Thaba Nchu in the former Orange Free State but had moved to Johannesburg in his 20s.

After matriculating from Soweto's Mapetla Tswana High School in 1981, Molekane trained as a teacher in Soweto. During this period, he became a prominent figure in the students' movement against apartheid, including as a founding member of the United Democratic Front in 1983. He also served as president of the Soweto Youth Congress from 1984 to 1985, and therefore become centrally involved in the Congress of South African Students (COSAS). In that capacity, he became a friend and colleague of Peter Mokaba, his counterpart in the Mankweng Youth Congress; they were arrested together for their COSAS activities and detained at Johannesburg Prison (Sun City).

At SAYCO's founding conference in March 1987 in Cape Town, Molekane was elected as inaugural general-secretary of SAYCO, serving alongside Mokaba, who was elected as president. In 1990, SAYCO was superseded by the newly relaunched ANC Youth League, and Molekane and Mokaba reprised their roles: he was secretary-general of the league for two terms from 1990 to 1994. In 1992, he was widely viewed as a plausible candidate to challenge Mokaba for the presidency, but he did not ultimately do so.

== National Assembly: 1994–1999 ==
In South Africa's first post-apartheid elections in 1994, Molekane was elected to an ANC seat in the National Assembly, the lower house of the new South African Parliament. He chaired Parliament's Portfolio Committee on Safety and Security. During this period, according to Molekane, he and a handful of other ANC representatives were handpicked by Foreign Minister Alfred Nzo to undergo diplomatic training and become career diplomats.

== Diplomatic service: 1999–present ==
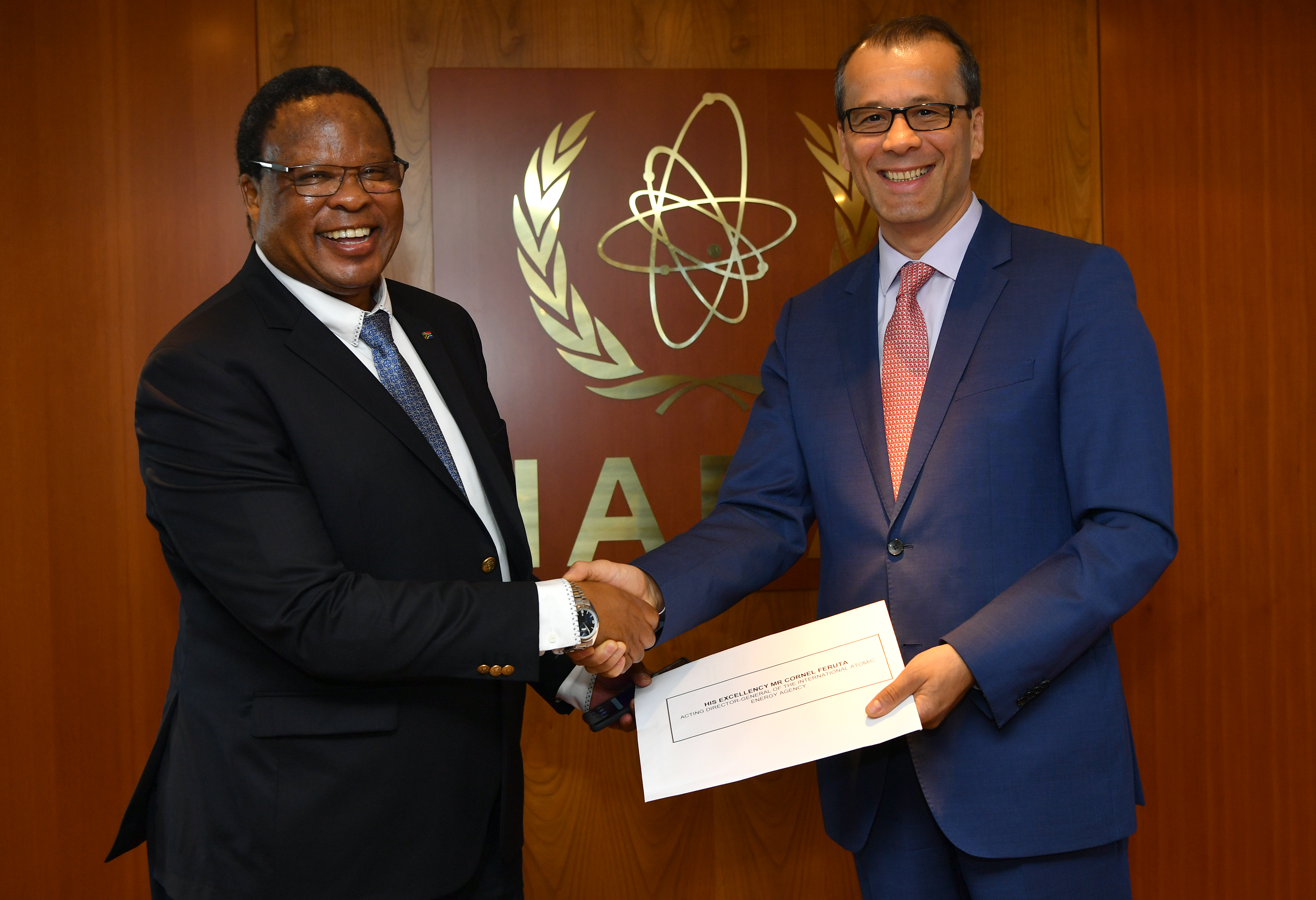
Molekane presents his credentials to Cornel Feruta of the International Atomic Energy Agency, 5 September 2019

Molekane left Parliament after the 1999 general election and joined the Department of Foreign Affairs, first as Consul-General to Bavaria and Baden-Württemberg in Germany from 1999 to 2003. He later served as High Commissioner to Ghana from 2004 to 2008 and as Ambassador to France from 2014 to 2019, with his ambassadorial terms punctuated by stints at the Department of Foreign Affairs, including on the African Union, Middle East, and Europe desks. On 10 July 2019, he presented his credentials as Ambassador to Austria; he also has non-resident accreditation to Slovenia and Slovakia and represents South Africa at international organisations based in Vienna.

== Personal life ==
He is married and has four children.
