= Imelda Molokomme =

Feminist activist and community developer from Botswana

Imelda Mishodzi Molokomme
- Born: 1942 (age 83–84); Botswana
- Education: University of Botswana
- Children: 9, including Athaliah

Imelda Mishodzi Molokomme (born 1942) is a feminist activist and community developer from Botswana, "well known for her active role in the gender agenda". Molokomme married at 17, and did not start her university degree until she was 42, and her daughter, Athaliah Molokomme, the country's Attorney General, was one of her lecturers.

== Early life ==
Imelda Mishodzi Molokomme was born in Botswana, but moved to Cape Town with her father when she was four years old. She returned to Botswana to be educated at secondary school in Mochudi, where she was the only girl in her class. Molokomme did not start a degree until she was 42 years old, and enrolled at the University of Botswana, where her daughter, Athaliah Molokomme, Botswana's Attorney General, was one of her lecturers.

== Career ==
In 2002, she was the co-author of the book Promoting an Integrated Approach to Combat Gender Based Violence: A Training Manual, published by the Commonwealth Secretariat, which is also available for free online.

In February 2007, Molokomme was voted in unopposed as the new president of Emang Basadi, by members of the Botswana women's organisation, with Diana Leagajang elected vice president, beating Rhoda Sekgoroane.

In 2014, she commented on the women's movement in Botswana, "It would seem women have given up and surrendered to the cause. Numbers were higher before and after the period when women returned from the World Conference on Women held in Beijing 1995".

Molokomme runs a consultancy company in Botswana which trains and coaches women in politics and unions.

== Personal life ==
Molokomme married at the age of 17. She is the mother of Botswana's first woman Attorney General, Athaliah Molokomme.

== Publications ==
- Promoting an Integrated Approach to Combat Gender Based Violence: A Training Manual (2002)
- The Phenomenal Woman's Empowerment Handbook Molokomme, I. M. (2006).
- Tautz, S., Jahn, A., Molokomme, I., & Görgen, R. (2000). Between fear and relief: how rural pregnant women experience foetal ultrasound in a Botswana district hospital. Social Science & Medicine, 50(5), 689–701.
- I am Tjibelu: Memoirs of an Inspired Life (2020)
