= Youngor Sevelee Telewoda =

Liberian diplomat

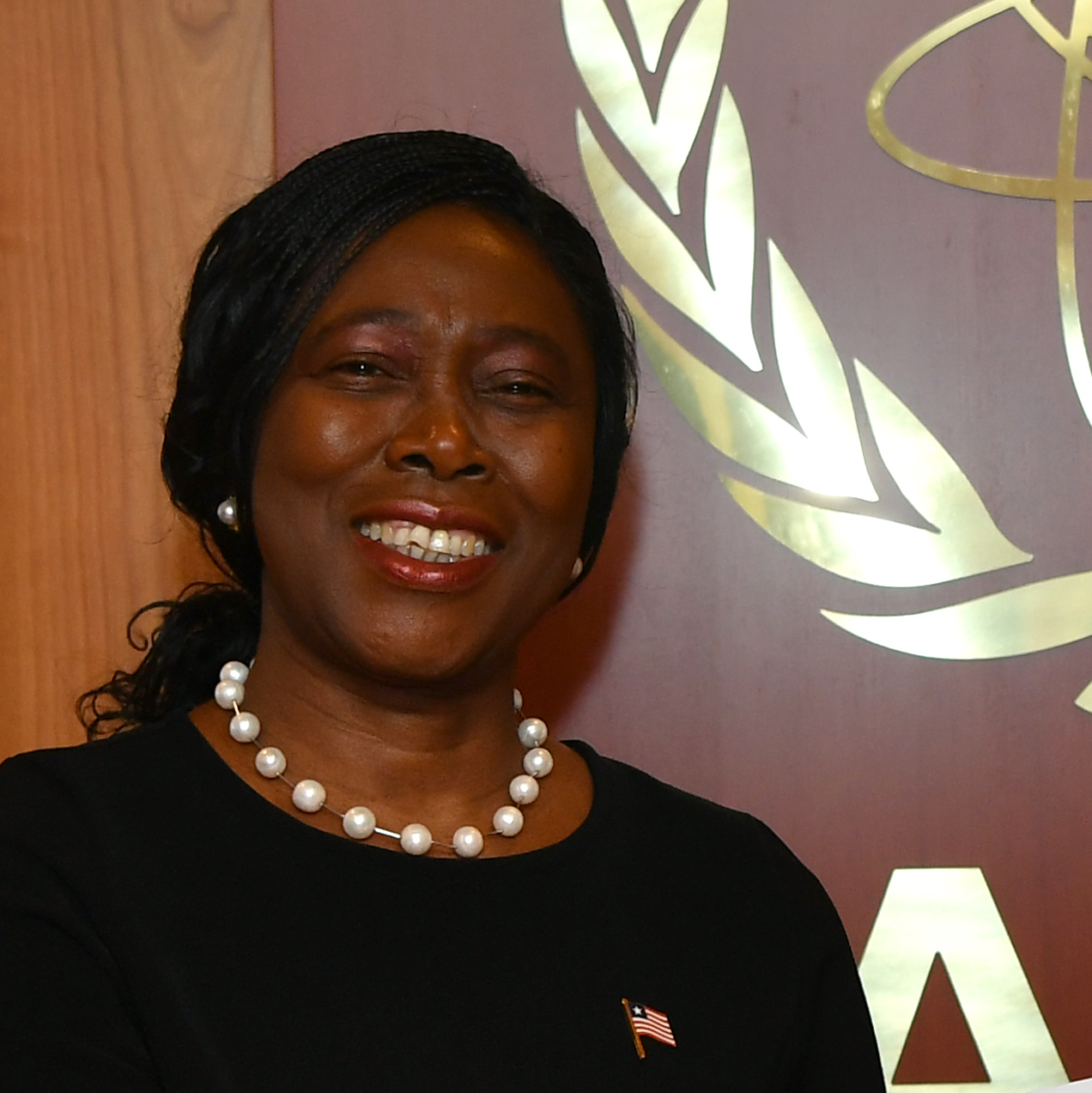
Youngor Sevelee Telewoda

Youngor Sevelee Telewoda (born September 3, 1952, in Firestone, Margibi County, Liberia) is the Liberian ambassador to Germany, Austria, Japan with Co-Accreditation to Indonesia, the Republic of Korea, Malaysia, Singapore, the Philippines, Thailand and New Zealand from 2011 to 2017. From 2003 to 2010, Telewoda served as Liberia’s Ambassador Extraordinary and Plenipotentiary to Belgium with concurrent accreditation to the Netherlands, Luxembourg and the European Union.

== Education ==
- High School Diploma, College of West Africa, Monrovia, Liberia, 1967 – 1970
- Bachelor of Business Administration (Management), University of Liberia, Monrovia, Liberia, 1971 – 1974
- Master´s degree in Business Administration, Pace University, New York, USA, 1976 – 1979
- Diploma in Project Planning and Budgeting for Rural Development in Third World Countries from the University of Bradford, England, April - July 1982.
