= International Nuremberg Principles Academy =

German law and human rights foundation

- Abbreviation: Nuremberg Academy
- Established: 2014
- Founder: Federal Republic of Germany, Free State of Bavaria, City of Nuremberg
- Type: Civil-law foundation
- Location: Nuremberg, Germany
- Director: Christoph Safferling
- Deputy Director: Viviane Dittrich
- Website: www.nurembergacademy.org

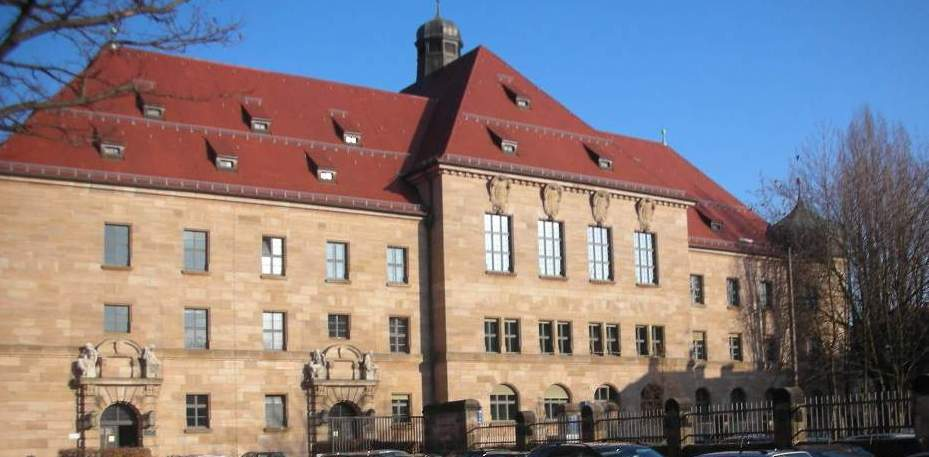
The Nuremberg Academy is situated in the Nuremberg Palace of Justice where the Nuremberg Trials took place.

The International Nuremberg Principles Academy (also called "Nuremberg Academy", German: "Internationale Akademie Nürnberger Prinzipien") is a civil-law foundation dedicated to the advancement of international criminal law and related human rights. It was founded in 2014 by the Federal Republic of Germany, the Free State of Bavaria and the City of Nuremberg and is situated in Nuremberg, Germany.

== Mission ==
The International Nuremberg Principles Academy aims to safeguard peace through the means of the law and preserve the legacy of the Nuremberg trials and the resulting Nuremberg principles. It supports the fight against impunity for universally recognised international core crimes: genocide, crimes against humanity, war crimes and the crime of aggression. Human activities leading to severe environmental harm usually also violate human rights which potentially qualifies them as a crime such as genocide, crimes against humanity or war crimes.

== Topics ==
The activities of the International Nuremberg Principles Academy cover international criminal law and related human rights. The Academy refers, also by name, to the Nuremberg Principles, which emerged from the Nuremberg Trials and are considered the cornerstone of modern international criminal law. The Academy is based in Germany, but its activities have an international focus and reach.

== Fields of Activities ==
The Academy contributes to the public discourse in the field of international criminal law, among other things by publishing guidelines, recommendations, principles and declarations.

=== Capacity Building ===
The Academy cooperates worldwide with international, national and regional partner organisations. The aim is to provide practitioners and institutions with knowledge and skills in international criminal law so that they can prosecute core international crimes. Annual programmes include the Nuremberg Summer Academy for young professionals on international criminal law and the Nuremberg Moot Court, a court competition for law students from all over the world, held together with Friedrich-Alexander University Erlangen-Nuremberg and its International Criminal Law Research Unit.

=== Interdisciplinary and Applied Research ===
The Academy conducts research with a practice-oriented approach on topics of international criminal law. Its research projects aim to contribute to the improvement of practices and international, hybrid and national jurisprudence. The research projects cover topics such as electronic evidence, the length of the proceedings at the International Criminal Court, private investigations in international criminal justice and hate speech in the context of international criminal law.

=== Events ===
The Academy organises international meetings, seminars, panel discussions and conferences. The annual conference Nuremberg Forum serves “as an international forum for current issues in international criminal law for people involved in the theory and practice of this field, as well as for diplomats, multipliers and civil society”.

=== Publications – Nuremberg Academy Series ===
The Nuremberg Academy Series covers practice-relevant topics in international criminal law. It focuses on existing and pressing legal issues and is dedicated to the challenges of combating impunity for crimes under international criminal law in the 21st century.

- Two Steps Forward, One Step Back: The Deterrent Effect of International Criminal Tribunals (2017) edited by Jennifer Schense and Linda Carter
- Islam and International Criminal Law and Justice (2018) edited by Tallyn Gray
- The Tokyo Tribunal: Perspectives on Law, History and Memory (2020) edited by Viviane E. Dittrich, Kerstin von Lingen, Philipp Osten and Jolana Makraiová
- Integrity in International Justice (2020) edited by Morten Bergsmo and Viviane E. Dittrich
- The Past, Present, and Future of the International Criminal Court (2021) edited by Alexander Heinze and Viviane E. Dittrich

== Advisory Council ==
The Academy is supported by a panel of internationally renowned experts.

- Silvia Fernández de Gurmendi (President)
- Serge Brammertz (Vice President)
- Stefanie Schmahl (Vice President)
- Piotr Hofmański
- Peter Frank
- Brenda Hollis
- Athaliah Molokomme
- Betty Kaari Murungi
- Navanethem Pillay (President until 2024)
- Bertram Schmitt
- Sang-Hyun Song
- Ivana Hrdličková
- Leila N. Sadat
