= Clara Manuela da Luz Delgado Jesus =

Ambassador of Cape Verde

- in 2025
- Education: Kyiv University
- Occupation: diplomat
- Known for: Ambassador

Clara Manuela da Luz Delgado Jesus is an ambassador of Cape Verde. From 2021 she was the ambassador to Switzerland, the United Nations and the World Trade Organisation

== Life ==
Da Luz Delgado completed her master's degree at Kyiv University. In 2009 she had been working for three years at a ministry when she was appointed to be a chargé d'affaires in her country's embassy in Luxembourg. She speaks Russian, English, French and Portuguese.

In 2015 she was promoted to be a minister plenipotentiary. For four years starting in 2016 she was as advisor to Jorge Carlos Fonseca, the president of Cape Verde.

In 2021 she became the ambassador to Switzerland and the permanent representative of Cabo Verde to the United Nations and World Trade Organization.

In June 2023 she became a World Trade Organisation's Trade and Gender Informal Working Group co-chair.

In 2026 she was elected to be the chair of the Committee on Regional Trade Agreements replacing the ambassador from Ecuador. She was still the Capo Verde's ambassador to the International Atomic Energy Agency (IAEA). Her country signed its first programme with the IAEA which covered 2026 to 2031.
