= Regional Guard Brigades =

- لشكری پشتیوانی هەرێمی romanized: Leshkrey Piştîwanî Herêmî
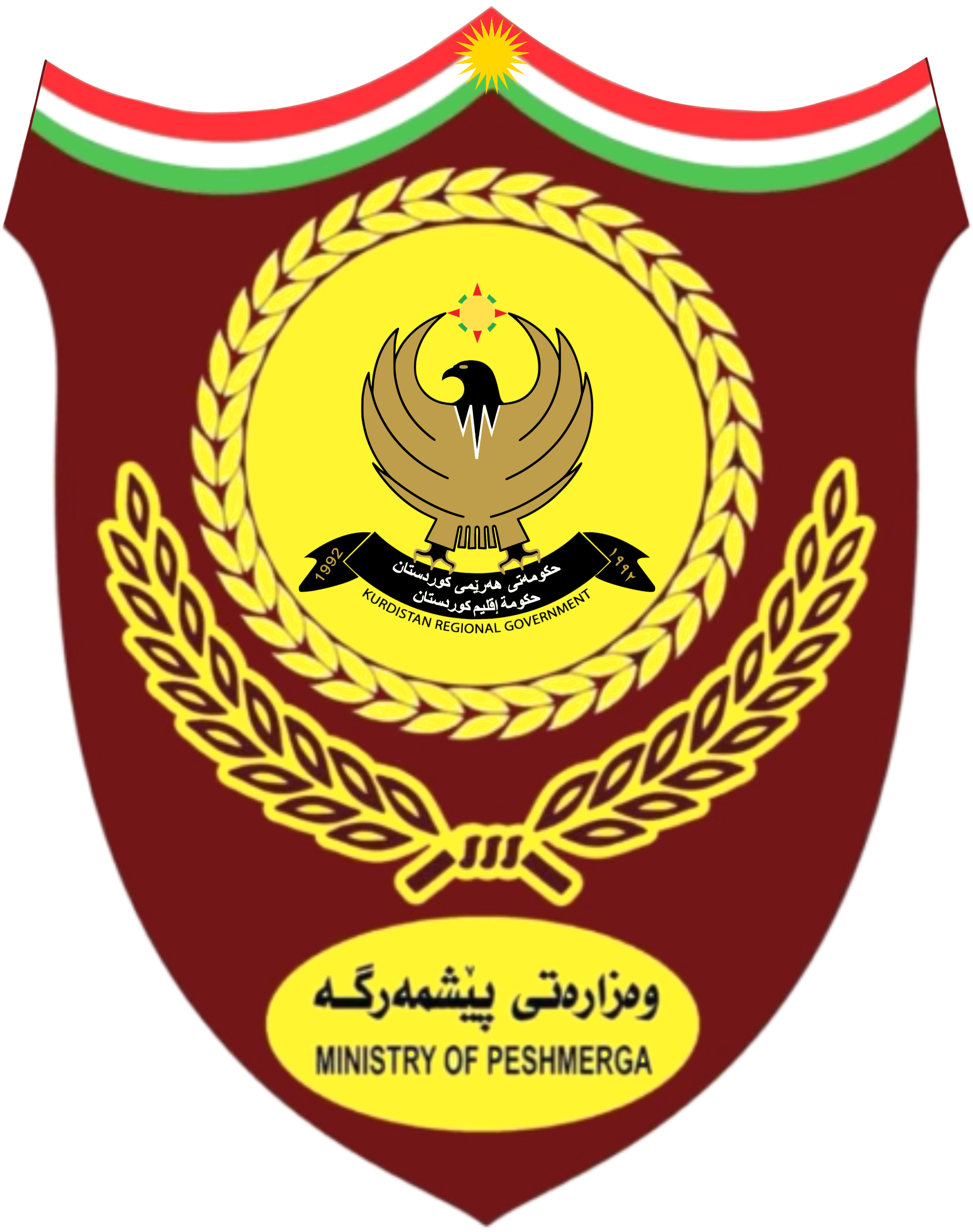
- Emblem of the Ministry of Peshmerga Affairs
- Active: 2010–present
- Country: Iraq
- Allegiance: Kurdistan Regional Government
- Branch: Peshmerga
- Type: Infantry
- Role: Territorial Defense, Counterinsurgency, Counterterrorism, Security
- Size: 74,400
- Part of: Ministry of Peshmerga Affairs
- Garrison/HQ: Zakho, Qalachulan

Commanders
- Minister of Peshmerga Affairs: Shoresh Ismail Abdulla

The Regional Guard Brigades (Kurdish: لشكری پشتیوانی هەرێمی, romanized: Leshkrey Piştîwanî Herêmî, RGBs) are one of the main military formations of the Peshmerga, the armed forces of the Kurdistan Region. The brigades were created as part of efforts to unify the party-based Peshmerga forces under a more centralized command. Numbering several dozen brigades, they are formally under the authority of the Kurdistan Regional Government's (KRG) Ministry of Peshmerga Affairs (MoPA), though in practice many remain aligned with the two dominant Kurdish political parties, the Kurdistan Democratic Party (KDP) and the Patriotic Union of Kurdistan (PUK). As part of international efforts to depoliticize and professionalize the Peshmerga, the Regional Guard Brigades have received more extensive training than the party-affiliated units. The Regional Guard Brigades have been deployed most notably in the War against the Islamic State (ISIS) from 2014 onward.

== History ==
=== Establishment of the MoPA ===
The MoPA was established following the creation of the autonomous Kurdistan Region in Iraq in the early 1990s as an attempt to place the Peshmerga under a unified civilian authority. Based on the 50-50 power sharing principle the KDP and PUK passed Law No. 5 transforming the Peshmerga into a regular armed force under the MoPA and prohibiting political parties from maintaining private militias. In practice, however, the ministry held little real power, as the armed forces remained divided between the KDP and the PUK. This lack of centralized control became evident during the Kurdish civil war (1994–1997), when the two parties used their separate Peshmerga forces against each other. After the conflict, the 1998 Washington Agreement, the 2006 KRG unifcation agreement following the Fall of Saddam Hussein, and the organisational reunification of the parties’ separate Peshmerga ministries in 2009, the MoPA was gradually revitalized. Under the Multinational Forces in Iraq and Article 117 of the new 2005 Iraqi Constitution the Peshmerga was legalized as one of the permissible regional groups responsible for security in the KRG.

=== 2010-2014 ===
In January 2010, the first Regional Guard Brigade was established under the ministry's authority and three more RGBs were formed in the following months. In the same year, the Iraqi Prime Minister Nouri Al-Maliki officially recognised the four RGBs as full members of the Iraqi Security Forces, therefore allowing them training and incorporation under the oversight of the United States Forces in Iraq. A total of 14 supposedly apolitical RGBs were eventually formed, comprising 40,000 KDP and PUK fighters. Partisanship within the RGB remained a problem.

=== 2014-2017 ===
Following the War against the Islamic State and 2017 Kirkuk Crisis, two conflicts which exposed partisanship whitin the RGBs, the Netherlands, the US, the UK, and Germany formed the Multi-National Advisory Group (MNAG) to support the establishment of a unified "modern, effective, affordable, and accountable Peshmerga" under the MoPA. The MNAG pressured the KDP and PUK to establish more mixed RGBs in condition for further aid and funding. In turn the two parties united 12 to 14 brigades in the following years under the RGB.

=== 2017-2025 ===
A 35-point plan (now refined to 31 points) for unification, jointly developed with the US, UK, and Germany was being implemented by the MoPA between 2017 and 2022.

In 2021 and 2022, the KDP's 1st Support Forces and the PUK's 2nd Support Forces were integrated into the MoPA, a move described by Col. Todd Burroughs, deputy director of the US-led coalition's Military Advisor Group North, as a 'significant step in the Peshmerga reform process.' These units provide unprecedented support functions for the RGBs.

==== 2022 MoU ====
A major step towards unification was reached in 2022, when a four-year memorandum of understanding (MoU) between the US Department of Defense and Ministry of Peshmerga Affairs was signed, outlining conditions and timelines for integration into MoPA, effective until September 2026.

By 2025, unification was in its final phase, with 10 additional RGBs formed. As of Q2 2025, 28 Regional Guard Brigades were unified, 4 divisions operational, biometric enrollment exceeded 85%, and a four-year budget was submitted for a 138,000-strong force. Salary digitization via 'MyAccount' was nearing completion.

=== Future outlook ===
In spite of all reforms, officers partially still continue to report to and take orders from their party leaders who also control the deployment of forces loyal to them and appoint front-line and sector commanders. Critical reforms stalled include the full integration of Unit 80 and Unit 70 into the RGBs and additional division HQs, amid U.S. frustration over partisanship. Peshmerga officials repeatedly affirm that full unification will be completed by 2026, if not sooner and U.S. officials stress that they will continue supporting unifying efforts.

== Structure ==
With 28 unified Regional Guard Brigades (RGB), the Ministry commands 74,400 Peshmerga soldiers, of whom 34,900 are based in the Erbil Governorate, 23,800 in the Duhok Governorate, and 15,700 in the Sulaymaniyah Governorate.

The 1st Support Forces and the 2nd Support Forces provide the RGBs with critical support functions.

The MoPA is aiming to establish enough RGBs so that they can form 11 divisions by 2026. As of November 2024 the RGBs are organized within 4 MoPA divisions.

== Training ==
As part of international efforts to depoliticize and professionalize the Peshmerga, the Regional Guard Brigades have received more extensive training than the party-affiliated units. Much of this training has been conducted at Kurdistan Training Coordination Center (KTCC) facilities, operated by a nine-nation coalition. Trainers are provided by Italy, Germany, Hungary, the Netherlands, Norway, Finland, the United Kingdom, and Turkey, with Slovenia contributing an administrative officer. The United States has supplied weapons and equipment in support of the program.
