= Battle of Kirkuk =

The Battle of Kirkuk may refer to several historical battles over several conflicts:

- Battle of Kirkuk (1733) during the Ottoman–Persian War (1730–35)
- Battle of Kirkuk (1991), part of the 1991 uprisings in Iraq
- Battle of Kirkuk (2014), part of the War in Iraq (2013–2017)
- Battle of Kirkuk (2015), part of the War in Iraq (2013–2017)
- Battle of Kirkuk (2016), part of the War in Iraq (2013–2017)
- Battle of Kirkuk (2017), part of the War in Iraq (2013–2017) and 2017 Iraqi-Kurdish Conflict
