= 1st Support Forces Command =

Kurdistan Region military unit

- هێزەکانی پشتیوانی یەکەم
- Active: 2003–present
- Country: Iraq
- Allegiance: Kurdistan Regional Government
- Branch: Peshmerga
- Type: Support unit
- Role: Artillery and training support
- Part of: Ministry of Peshmerga Affairs
- Colors: Green
- Engagements: Iraq War; War against the Islamic State; Battle of Kirkuk; Battle of Mosul; 2017 Iraqi–Kurdish conflict; Battle of Kirkuk; Battle of Altun Kupri
- Website: Official X account

Commanders
- Commander: Lt. Gen. Sihad Barzani

The 1st Support Forces Command (Kurdish: هێزەکانی پشتیوانی یەک, romanized: Hêzekanî Piştîwanî Yek, SFC) or First Support Forces is a unit of the Peshmerga, the military forces of the Kurdistan Region. The unit is part of the Ministry of Peshmerga Affairs (MoPA) and focuses on support roles, including artillery and officer training.

The First Support Forces were established as part of structural reforms to professionalize the Peshmerga. The unit has organized training programs and graduation ceremonies for newly recruited members and other Peshmerga unites. The force is closely linked to the Kurdistan Democratic Party but is formally under the Ministry of Peshmerga of the Kurdistan Regional Government.

== Training and activities ==
The Support Forces Command plays an important role in the defense structure of the Kurdistan Region. Through regular artillery training courses, the unit reflects the ongoing modernization of the Peshmerga and its cooperation with international coalition partners in military education and preparation.

In 2022, the forces held their fourth artillery training graduation as part of ongoing efforts to improve artillery capacity within the Peshmerga.

On 31 January 2025, the seventh infantry training and discipline course under the supervision of Lt. Gen. Sihad Barzani, was completed. Each course has included between 250 and 600 Peshmerga participants, with coalition commanders overseeing the training.

The U.S. Consulate General in Erbil announced the delivery of several lightweight 105 mm howitzers to the First and Second Support Forces. During the handover ceremony, Ministry of Peshmerga Affairs Chief of Staff Issa Ozer emphasized that the Peshmerga still require support from the U.S.-led coalition in weapons, logistics, and training.

== Command ==
The First Support Forces are commanded by Lt. Gen. Sihad Barzani, who has overseen training and organizational development.

== See also ==
- Regional Guard Brigades
- 2nd Support Forces Command
- Parastin u Zanyari
- Zeravani
