= 2nd Support Forces Command =

- هێزەکانی پشتیوانی دووەم romanized: Hêzekanî Piştîwanî Dûwem
- Emblem of the 2SFC
- Active: 2003–present
- Country: Iraq
- Allegiance: Kurdistan Regional Government
- Branch: Peshmerga
- Type: Combat support
- Role: Artillery support, Combat engineering, Air defense
- Size: < 10,000
- Part of: Ministry of Peshmerga Affairs
- Colors: Green
- Website: Official X account

Commanders
- Current Commander: Maj. Gen. Mariwan Muhammed Amin
- Deputy Commander: Maj. Gen. Hawraman Ahmed Mohammed

The 2nd Support Forces Command (Kurdish: هێزەکانی پشتیوانی دووەم, romanized: Hêzekanî Piştîwanî Dûwem, 2SFC) or 2nd Support Forces is a combat support unit of the Peshmerga, the military forces of the Kurdistan Region. The unit operates under the Ministry of Peshmerga Affairs (MoPA) and specializes in support functions such as artillery, heavy artillery, air defense, mobility assets, anti-tank measures, maintenance and engineering for the Regional Guard Brigades (RGB).

== History ==
Historically, the 2nd Support Forces belonged to the Patriotic Union of Kurdistan's (PUK) Peshmerga, operating specifically within the 70 Unit. However, in response to ongoing reform efforts within the Kurdistan Region's military sector, the unit was integrated into the MoPA in June 2021. The unit's integration followed the earlier incorporation of the Kurdistan Democratic Party's (KDP) 1st Support Forces into the MoPA. According to Col. Todd Burroughs, deputy director of the US-led coalition's Military Advisor Group North, the "unification of both 1st and 2nd Support Forces Commands under the MoPA is a significant step in the Peshmerga Reform process.”

== Structure ==
The exact size of the force is unclear, but together with the 1st Support Forces, they are estimated to number around 10,000 soldiers.

2nd Support Forces Command

- 1st Mortar Battalion (Unit 955)
- 2nd Mortar Battalion (Unit 515)
- Field Artillery Battalion (Unit 121)
  - Women's Artillery Battery
- 107mm MLRS Artillery Battalion (Unit 101)
- 1st 122mm MLRS Artillery Battalion (Unit 106)
- 2nd 122mm MLRS Artillery Battalion (Unit 757)
- 105mm Artillery Battalion (Unit 118)
- Defence and Tasks Regiment (Unit 103)
- Armored Battalion (Unit 104)
- Transportation and Logistics Battalion (Unit 105)
- Combat Engineering Battalion (Unit 545)
- Mechanised Infantry Battalion (Unit 616)
- Tank Battalion (Unit 617)
- 1st AA Artillery Battalion (Unit 888)
- Special Forces Unit
  - Tactical Company

== Capabilities and equipment ==
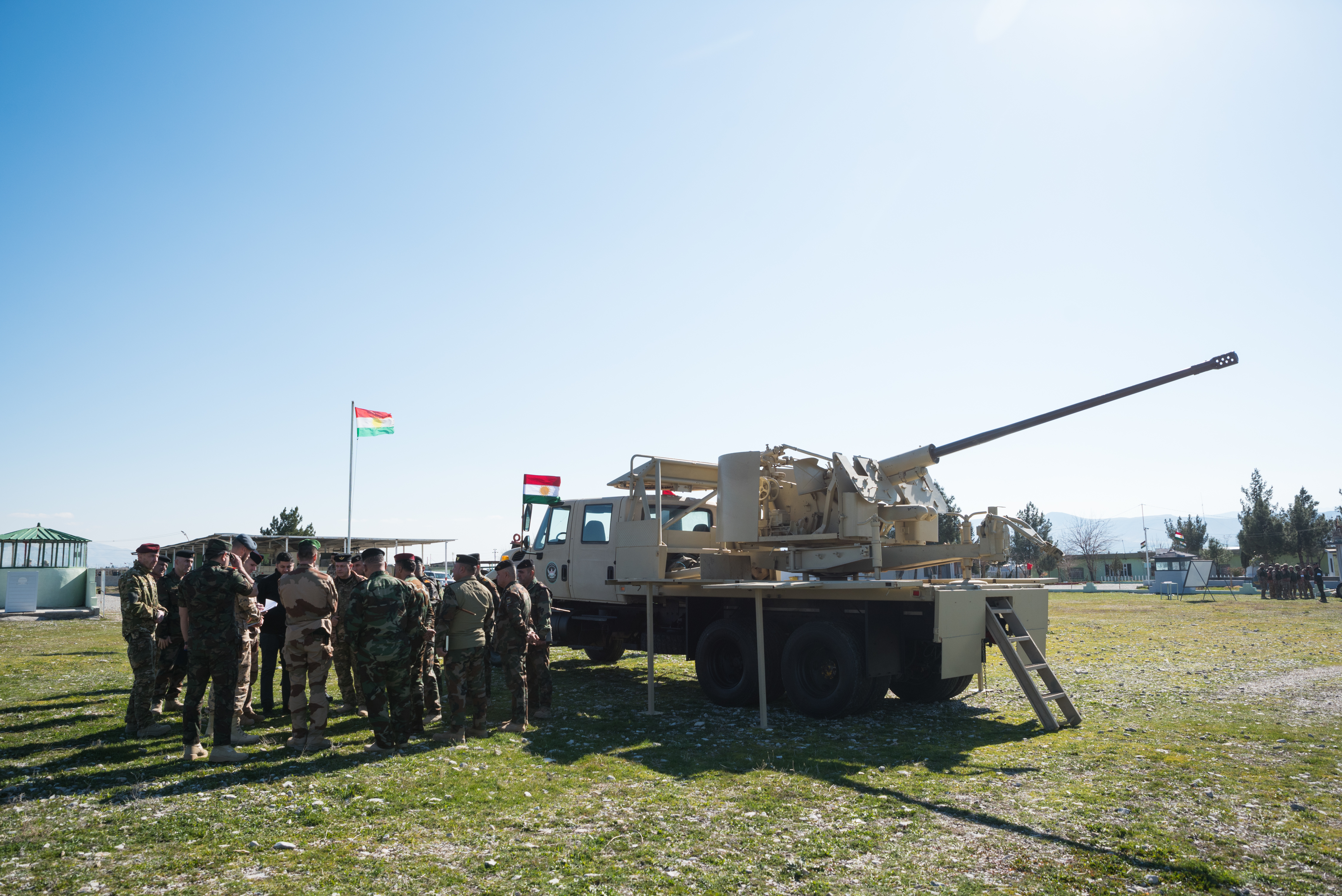
Coalition advisors and Peshmergas of the 2nd Support Forces Command next to a vehicle mounted AA gun

According to the Pentagon's quarterly inspector general report to the U.S. Congress on August 1, 2024, the MoPA's artillery capabilities reside within the 1st and 2nd Support Forces Commands. “Both commands have demonstrated proficiency in delivering accurate indirect fires; however, they have not supported combined arms operations since 2017,” the report noted. The report also explains how “Artillery regiments (within the units) hold exercises twice a year with live ammunition, but only in battery and smaller-sized formations that are disconnected from maneuver formations."

The unit employs a wide range of artillery systems, including howitzers and multiple launch rocket systems (MLRS). Following the unit's integration into the MoPA, the United States delivered ammunition and several lightweight 105 mm howitzers to the force, a move which was criticised by Mohammed al-Halbousi, the head of the Al-Taqadum Party, as according to him "their (Peshmerga) basic duty is only to maintain internal security within their area of responsibility."

In addition to heavy artillery, the unit is equipped with light mortars, anti-tank self propelled guns, and anti-aircraft weapons such as large and small caliber autocannons designed for ground-to-ground operations, some mounted on mechanized vehicles, along with tanks like the T-55.

== See also ==
- Regional Guard Brigades
- 1st Support Forces Command
