= Peshmerga =

Internal security forces of Iraq's Kurdistan Region

- پێشمەرگه; Pêşmerge
- Flag of Kurdistan, used by the Peshmerga
- Motto: Ey Reqîb
- Founded: 1946; 80 years ago (Mahabad Republic)
- Current form: 2003; 23 years ago (Kurdistan Region)
- Headquarters: Erbil, Kurdistan Region, Iraq
- Website: gov.krd/mopa

Leadership
- President of Kurdistan Region: Nechirvan Barzani
- Minister of Peshmerga Affairs: Shoresh Ismail Abdulla

Personnel
- Military age: 21–41
- Conscription: None
- Active personnel: 138,000 (planned end strength by 2026; current estimates 150,000–200,000)

Industry
- Domestic suppliers: (Iraq) Iraqi Ministry of Defense
- Foreign suppliers: Current: Albania Australia Austria Belgium Bulgaria Canada Croatia Cyprus Czech Republic Denmark Estonia Finland France Germany Greece Hungary India Italy Netherlands New Zealand Norway Romania Russia Slovakia Slovenia Sweden United Kingdom United States (continued via CTEF); Former: Czechoslovakia Soviet Union

Related articles
- History: 19th century - 21st century: Before 2003: Mehmûd Berzencî revolts; Ehmed Barzanî revolt; 1943 Barzanî revolt; First Iraqi–Kurdish War; Second Iraqi–Kurdish War; PUK insurgency; Iran–Iraq War; 1983–1986 Kurdish rebellions; Kurdistan Region–PKK conflict; Anfal campaign; Gulf War; 1991 Iraqi uprisings; Battle of Sulaymaniyah; Kurdish Civil War; Islamist insurgency in the Kurdistan Region; After 2003: 2003 invasion of Iraq; Operation Viking Hammer; First Iraq War; Iraqi insurgency (2003–2011); Iraqi civil war (2006–2008); Iraqi insurgency (2011–2013); War in Iraq (2013–2017); US intervention in the Syrian civil war; 2017 Iraqi–Kurdish conflict; Iraqi insurgency (2017–present); Operation Inherent Resolve; Attacks on US bases during the Gaza war; 2026 Iran war; 2026 Iranian strikes on the Kurdistan Region
- Ranks: Military ranks of the Peshmerga

The Peshmerga (Kurdish: پێشمەرگه, romanized: Pêşmerge, lit. ''Those Who Face Death'') are the internal security forces of the Kurdistan Region of Iraq. According to the Constitution of Iraq, federal regions (such as the Kurdistan Region) are responsible for "the establishment and organization of the internal security forces for the respective regions, such as police, security forces, and regional guards."

The history of Kurdish armed forces dates back to antiquity, with Kurdish military forces becoming more organized between the 16th and 19th centuries, when they served Kurdish tribal leaders and principalities, as well as the Ottoman and Safavid states as auxiliary and border forces. During the 20th century, these forces developed into increasingly organized guerrilla movements associated with Kurdish nationalist movements. The modern Peshmerga emerged in 1946 as the self-declared national army of the Republic of Mahabad. In the late 20th and beginning of the 21st century, the Peshmerga became institutionalized as the armed forces of the Kurdistan Regional Government (KRG). The term Peshmerga has also been used for a variety of Kurdish militias and armed groups, especially in Iranian Kurdistan, such as for the armed wings of the KDPI, PAK and Komala.

Formally, the Peshmerga are under the command of the Ministry of Peshmerga Affairs (MoPA) of the KRG. On September 10 2026, the Ministry of Peshmerga Affairs announced the completion of the process to unify and reorganize all Peshmerga forces under the Ministry, bringing the former 70 and 80 Forces into a unified command-and-control structure. Since the establishment of the Kurdistan Region in 1992, the Peshmerga was largely divided between the two main Iraqi Kurdish political parties, the Kurdistan Democratic Party (KDP) and the Patriotic Union of Kurdistan (PUK). Its integration under the Ministry of Peshmerga Affairs was pursued over subsequent years, including through a 2022 U.S.–KRG memorandum of understanding.

Other security institutions of the Kurdistan Region include the Zêrevanî, Asayish, Parastin u Zanyarî, and the Kurdish police force.

== Etymology ==
The word "Peshmerga" can be translated to "to stand in front of death", and Valentine states it was first used by Qazi Muhammad in the short-lived Mahabad Republic (1946–47). The word is understandable to Persian speakers. Because, the name was also used to refer to an elite unit within the Sassanid Empire's military, specifically a sub-unit of the Pushtigban, called the Gyan-avspar. These warriors were renowned for their unwavering loyalty and bravery, often serving as the last line of defense for the Sassanid kings. The Persian expression "pishmarg-e kesi shodan" literally meant "to die before someone."

== History ==
=== 20th century Kurdish revolts ===
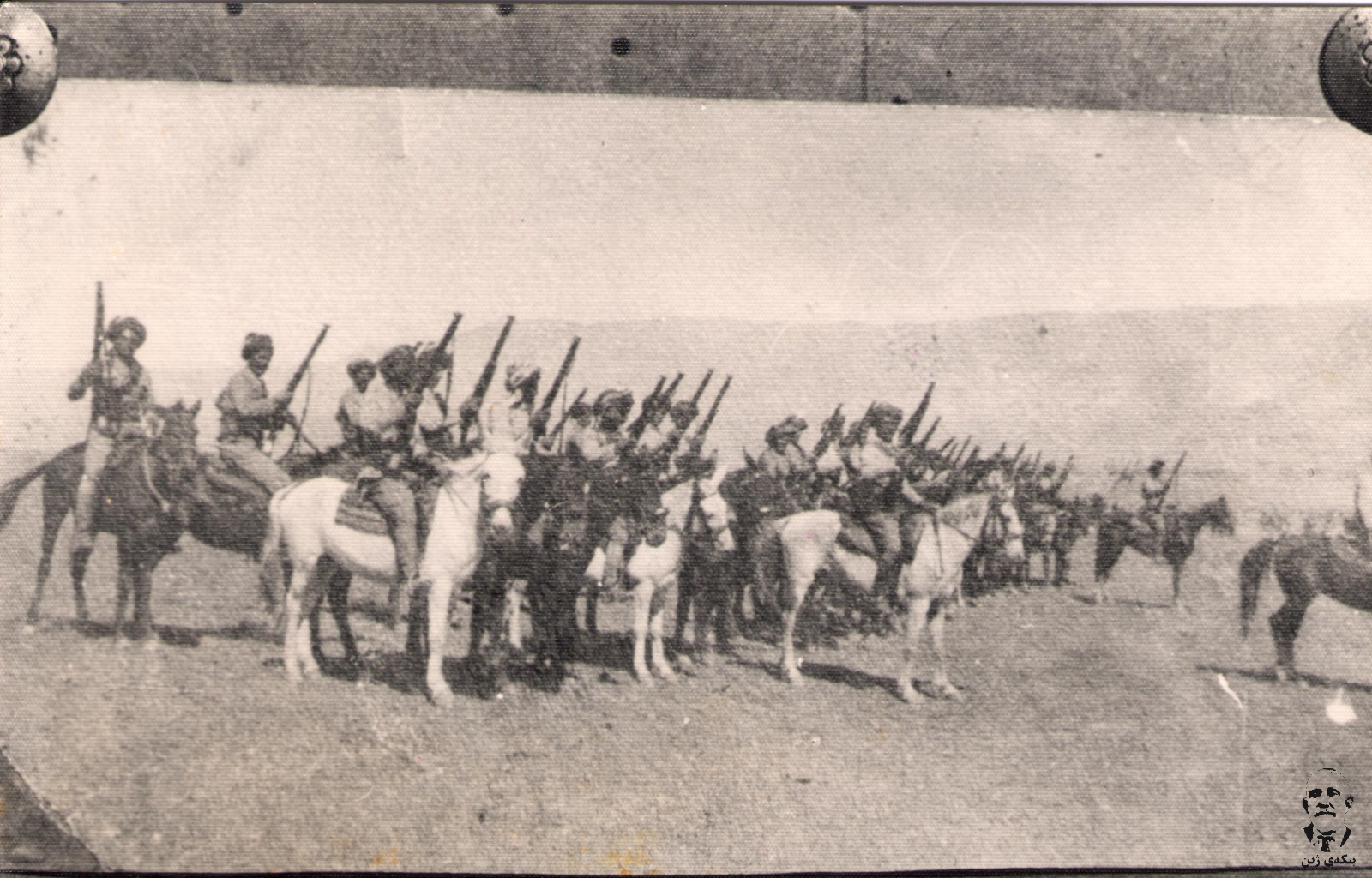
Kurdish cavalry under Mahmud Barzanji.

The Kurdish revolts of the early 20th century, such as the uprisings led by Sheikh Mahmoud Barzanji, the Ali Batı Revolt, the Koçgiri rebellion, the Beytüşşebab rebellion, the Sheikh Said rebellion, the Ararat Rebellion, and the Ahmed Barzani revolt, played an important role in the development of the modern Peshmerga. These events provided early experience in guerrilla and non-conventional warfare against state authorities and contributed to the spread of Kurdish nationalism among Kurdish fighters. They also strengthened the Barzani tribe, from which key leaders like Ahmed Barzani and Mustafa Barzani emerged.

Building on the military experience gained during these uprisings, Mustafa Barzani later organized Kurdish forces in order to liberate Kurdistan. In 1943, he led approximately 2,000 Kurdish fighters in an uprising against the Iraqi Army and British forces, an event often regarded as a precursor to the modern Peshmerga forces that would later emerge, particularly during the period of the Republic of Mahabad.

=== Mahabad Republic ===
During the brief existence of the self-declared Republic of Mahabad (1946–1947), a contingent of Kurdish fighters led by Mustafa Barzani served as its official national army after Barzani crossed the Iraq–Iran border to support the establishment of the Kurdish state in Iranian Kurdistan.

According to Kurdish lore, the leaders of Mahabad gathered to choose a name for their army. As the story goes, they struggled to find a suitable word for 'soldier.' A server, overhearing their discussion, suggested peshmerga, a slang term from his nearby village. The name was adopted, and the force was formally named the Peshmerga. Furthermore, under president Qazi Muhammad’s orders, a committee of “hand-picked litterateurs and writers” also developed distinct Kurdish military terminology to define ranks and positions.

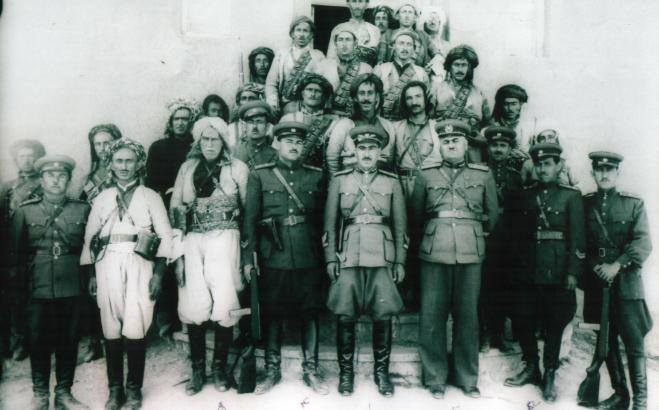
Mustafa Barzani (center front) with other Kurdish military officials of the Republic of Mahabad.

The relative of Simko Shikak, Amr Khan Shikak, along with the tribal leader of Baneh, Hama Rashid, Khan Banei, and Zero Beg Herki, were appointed as Marshals of the Peshmerga army by the Minister of War, Mohammed Hossein Saif Qazi. Due to his extensive warfare experience Mustafa Barzani was appointed as Marshal and chief of staff of the army. Officers maintained a professional appearance through their Soviet-style uniforms, further advised and organized by the Soviet military officer Captain Salahaddin Kazimov. The Soviets continued their influence by sending at least 60 Kurdish officers to Soviet Azerbaijan for additional military training. The Mahabad army consisted of about 70 officers, 40 non-commissioned officers, and 1,200 privates. As one of the senior leaders, Mustafa Barzani was responsible for appointing officers within the ranks.

In order to protect the republic's sovereignty, the Peshmerga engaged in their first fight during the Battle of Qahrawa, near the town of Saqqez. They ambushed an Iranian garrison, killing 21 soldiers, wounding 17, and capturing 40. By mid-May 1946 Kurdish forces numbered approximately 12,750 Peshmerga, but most Kurdish offensives were limited to minor skirmishes.

==== Fall of the republic ====
The withdrawal of Soviet support and the subsequent collapse of the republic, including the execution of its head of state, Qazi Muhammad, dismantled the Peshmerga's organization, who had agreed with the Iranians to peacefully withdraw from the capital of Mahabad, to avoid civilians casualties. Peshmerga forces led by Barzani remained active in rural areas of Iranian Kurdistan for a period following the collapse of the republic and engaged Iranian Army units in March 1947. During these clashes, the Peshmerga reportedly inflicted significant casualties and captured several Iranian officers, particularly during the Battle of Nalos, including Lieutenant Jahanbani, the son of General Nader Jahanbani.

Iranian attacks continued against the remaining Peshmerga forces, prompting Barzani to order a retreat toward his home region of Barzan in Iraqi Kurdistan. Upon reaching the Iraqi–Iranian border, several returning Peshmerga officers were arrested by the Iraqi Army and executed, despite earlier assurances of amnesty. In an effort to capture Barzani, Iraqi authorities subsequently deployed large numbers of troops to the region. Anticipating further action, Barzani and his followers fled once again, moving along the Turkish–Iranian border and eventually into the Soviet Union, where they remained in exile until 1958.

=== Iraqi Kurdistan ===
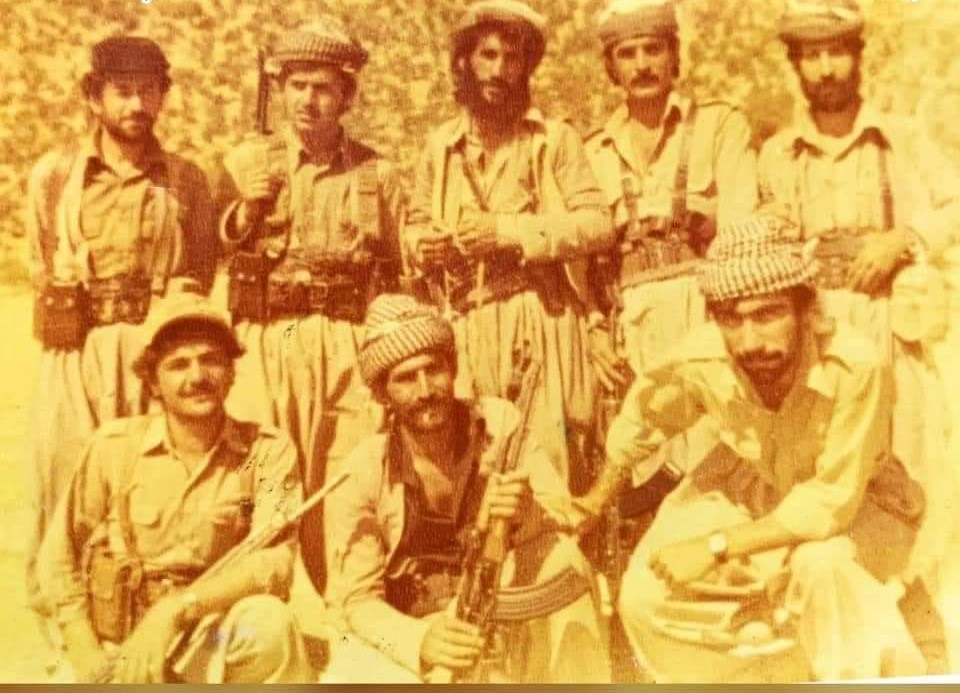
Mid-20th-century Peshmerga fighters with the famous Kurdish guerrilla fighter Mama Risha (center back).

Following the 1958 Iraqi military coup, exiled Peshmerga fighters led by Barzani and his newly established Kurdistan Democratic Party (KDP) were permitted to return to Iraq by Abdul-Karim Qasim. In return, Barzani’s Peshmerga initially supported Qasim's efforts to establish a multiethnic Iraqi state against Arab nationalist revolts. However, as Barzani's influence grew, Qasim declined to meet Kurdish demands, leading to increasing tensions between the two sides. By the end of 1961, Barzani had succeeded in uniting many Kurdish tribes under the Peshmerga and controlled large parts of Iraqi Kurdistan. These developments, combined with Qasim’s concerns over Barzani’s expanding power, culminated in the outbreak of the First Iraqi–Kurdish War in 1961. The conflict, which lasted until 1970, marked the first major war fought by the Peshmerga in Iraqi Kurdistan, with Barzani and his forces seeking Kurdish independence. The war resulted in the signing of the Iraqi–Kurdish Autonomy Agreement between the Kurds and the Ba'athist regime, which had replaced Qasim in 1963. Kurdish autonomy had failed to be implemented by 1974, which led to the Second Iraqi–Kurdish War in 1975. Jalal Talabani, a leading member of the KDP, left the same year to revitalize the resistance and founded the Patriotic Union of Kurdistan (PUK). This event created the baseline for the political discontent between the KDP and PUK that divides Peshmerga forces and much of Kurdish society to this day. After Mustafa Barzani's death in 1979, his son Masoud Barzani took over his position. Political tensions increased between the KDP and PUK in the years after, while Peshmerga forces fought to keep Iraqi Kurdistan under their own party's control, whilst also fighting off the Iraqi Army's incursions.

In 1988, the Ba'athist Iraqi regime launched the Anfal campaigns against the Peshmerga and their civilian supporters in rural areas of Iraqi Kurdistan, resulting in the deaths of hundreds of thousands of people, most of them civilians. During the fighting against the Peshmerga, the Iraqi army was at times supported by Kurdish collaborators, commonly referred to as jash.

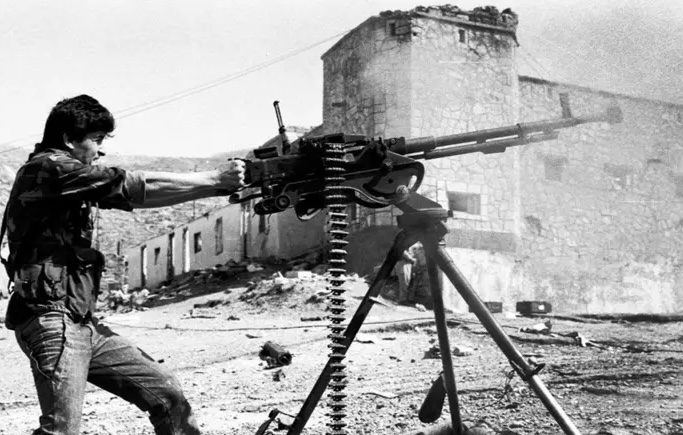
Kurdish fighter during the 1991 Iraqi uprisings (Raperîn)

Following the First Gulf War, the 1991 uprisings (Raperîn) broke out, which led to de facto autonomy for the Kurdistan Region. Both party-affiliated and non-party-affiliated Peshmerga played a significant role during the uprisings, while their fighting capabilities were greatly enhanced by the Iraqi no-fly zones, which stayed in place until 2003. Killed Peshmerga were commemorated as martyrs. The memory of killed, injured and veteran Peshmerga fighters became widespread in public life through paintings, sculptures, and memorials, as well as through regular representation on radio and television and in commemorative rituals. Most Kurdish collaborators were granted amnesty, and some were subsequently incorporated into the Peshmerga forces of their respective parties.

After gaining autonomy, the Kurdish Civil War broke out, a conflict between the rivaling KDP and PUK parties, in which Peshmerga forces were used to fight against each other. The civil war officially ended in September 1998 when the Barzanis and Talabanis signed the Washington Agreement establishing a formal peace treaty. In the agreement, the parties agreed to share oil revenue and power, deny the use of Iraqi Kurdistan to the Kurdistan Workers' Party (PKK), and to not allow Iraqi troops into the Kurdish regions. By then, around 5,000 Peshmerga and civilians had been killed on both sides, and many more had been evicted for being on the "wrong side".

Throughout the decades of conflict, the Peshmerga were widely considered to be liberators of the Kurdish population.

=== 2003-2011 invasion and occupation of Iraq ===
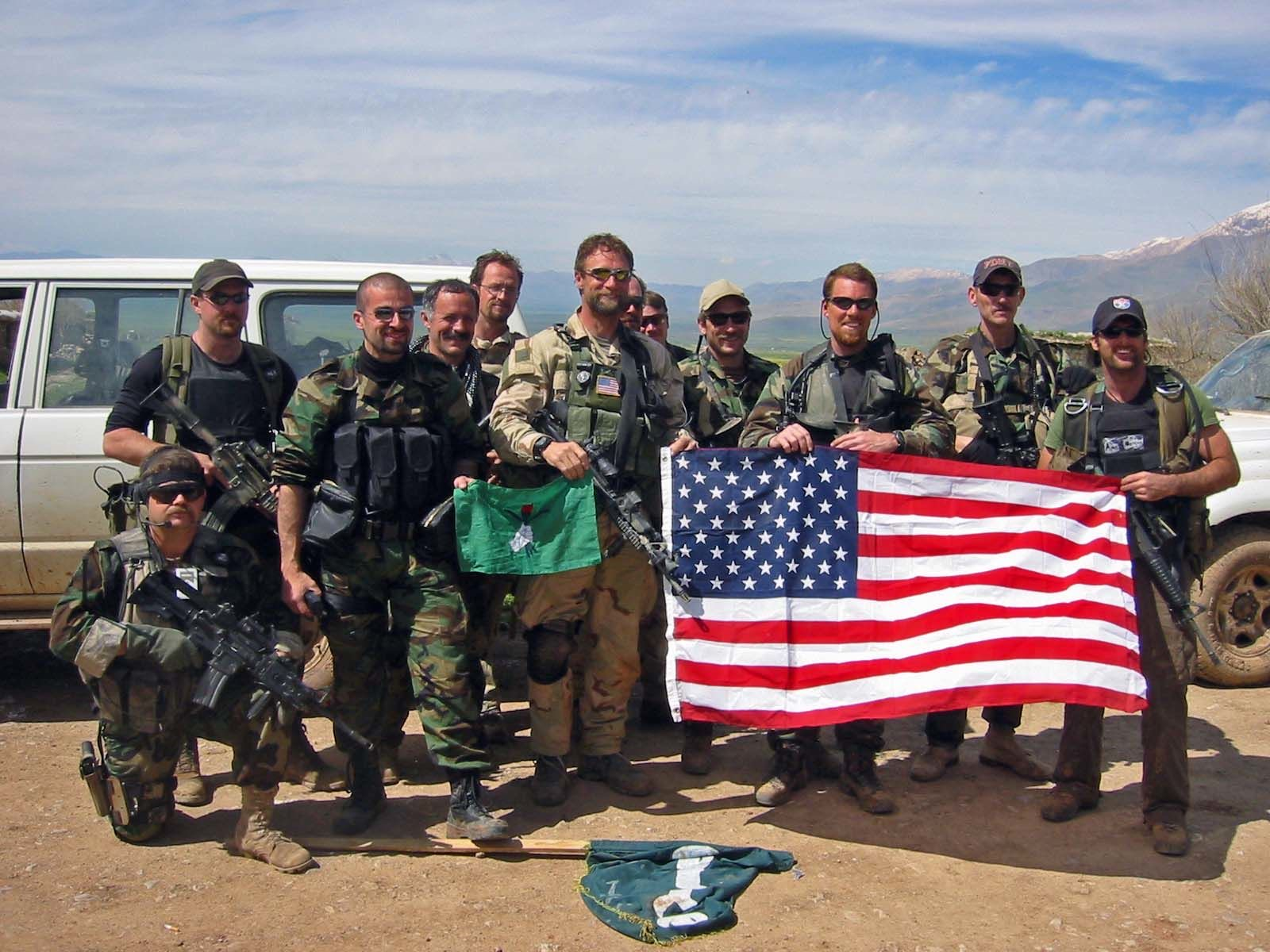
Kurdish Peshmerga and U.S. special forces after defeating Ansar al-Islam during Operation Viking Hammer in Halabja, Iraqi Kurdistan.

In the years after, tensions remained high, but both parties came closer to each other, and in 2003 both of them, jointly took part in the overthrowing of the Baathist regime as part of the Iraq War and the broader Global War on Terror. The CIA and other US special forces, who arrived in Iraq in early 2002, conducted unconventional warfare operations with the Peshmerga against Ansal al-Islam terrorists. Furthermore Peshmerga were organized to form a 'northern Front' against Saddam Hussein's troops. As the bombing campaign and subsequent invasion of Iraq began, Peshmerga forces, operating alongside U.S. Special Forces, advanced beyond the Kurdistan Region and took control of large areas that were widely regarded as Kurdish but had previously been outside Kurdish control. These areas included Sinjar, Tuz Khurmatu, Khanaqin, and Kirkuk. By tying down Saddam Hussein’s 5th Division in northern Iraq, the Peshmerga, helped facilitate the coalition’s invasion of southern Iraq and reduced the number of Iraqi forces available to oppose coalition operations elsewhere, likely saving hundreds if not thousands of lives. The Peshmerga also played a key role in helping the United States on the mission to capture Iraqi dictator Saddam Hussein.

After the overthrowing, the Peshmerga were politically recognized and obtained a special legal position. This improvement came from the Coalition Provisional Authority (CPA) with issuing orders that recognized the Peshmerga and exempted them from disbandment. However, the decision was preceded by disagreements between Kurdish leader Masoud Barzani and the U.S. Administrator of Iraq, Paul Bremer, who regarded the continued existence of the Peshmerga as a "red line" in the formation of the new Iraqi state. Barzani rejected calls for disbandment, reportedly telling Bremer to "be a man and come to Kurdistan to disband [the] Peshmerga." Bremer subsequently abandoned his efforts to disband the Peshmerga. In August 2003, parts of the Peshmerga were assigned to border security and oil pipeline protection, while others trained with coalition troops. Peshmerga units collaborated closely with U.S. forces on patrols, interrogations, and security missions. At one point, the Peshmerga made up 30% of the new Iraqi Army.

In 2004, CTG Kurdistan captured Saudi-born Pakistani terrorist Hassan Ghul, who was operating for al-Qaeda in Iraq. Ghul was turned over to American intelligence officers shortly afterwards, which eventually led to the killing of Osama bin Laden in a covert American military operation in Pakistan in 2011.

==== Legal recognition ====
Article 117 of the new 2005 Iraqi Constitution allowed federal regions (such as the Kurdistan Region) to establish their own internal security services; that is, the "police, security forces and guards of the region." The Peshmerga are legally recognized as one of these permissible regional internal security forces.

In 2006, a major conference in Erbil, involving the KRG, Iraqi Government, and Multinational Forces in Iraq, further clarified the Peshmerga's role: defending the Kurdistan Region, supporting federal security efforts, fighting terrorism, and preserving constitutional institutions.

==== Post-recognition phase ====
Following recognition by international powers and under the Iraqi Constitution, the situation in the Kurdistan Region during the occupation of Iraq remained relatively stable, allowing the Peshmerga to reorganize and train their forces at military academies in the Zakho–Duhok and Qalachulan–Sulaymaniyah areas, while staying divided between the KDP and the PUK.

Over the course of the occupation of Iraq, the Peshmerga’s role gradually evolved from primarily providing security to participating in active counterinsurgency operations, in coordination with Iraqi security forces and multinational forces, against former Ba’athist elements, Al-Qaeda, Sunni tribal fighters, and foreign combatants. Anti-terror operations carried out by the Peshmerga contributed to making the Kurdistan Region one of the more stable areas in Iraq.

In 2009 to 2010, growing accusations of corruption against both parties led to the defection of many party-affiliated Peshmerga to the Gorran Movement, which called for the dissolution of party militias and the elimination of corruption. Following the death of its leader, Nawshirwan Mustafa, the movement’s popularity declined, and most Peshmerga fighters remained under the control of the KDP and PUK.

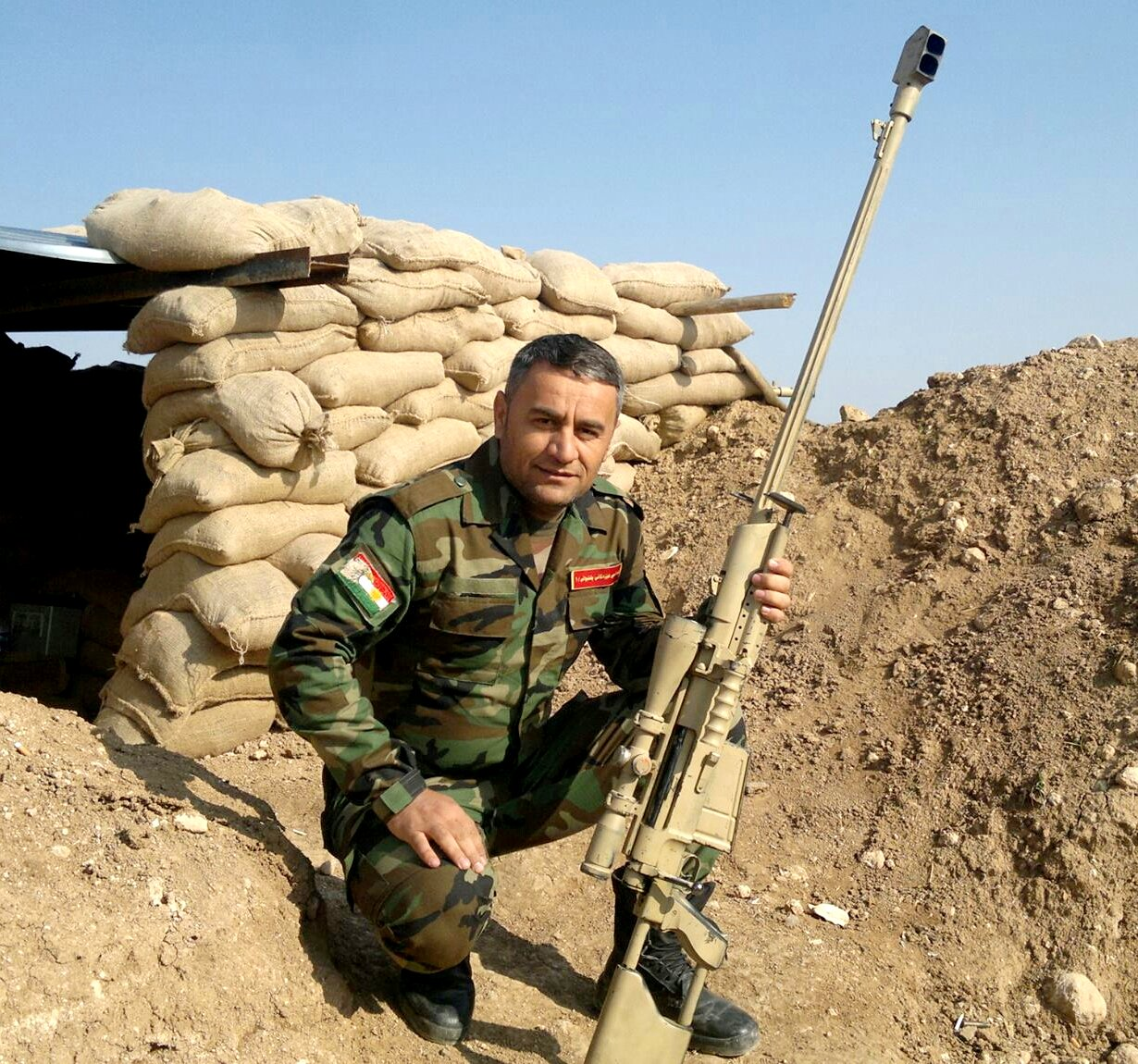
Kurdish Peshmerga soldier with an M93 rifle.

=== 2014 war against the Islamic State ===
In the first half of 2014, during the Islamic State’s (ISIL/ISIS) offensive, the Iraqi Armed Forces rapidly collapsed in much of Sunni-majority western Iraq, leading to the fall of Mosul and other strategic areas. Peshmerga forces, many of whom had not experienced major combat for over a decade, swiftly moved into positions abandoned by Iraqi forces in disputed territories with significant Kurdish populations, including Sinjar, Jalawla, Tuz Khurmatu, Rabia and the oil-rich city of Kirkuk. Most of Iraqi Kurdistan's southern regions, including Jalawla, Tuz Khurmatu and Kirkuk remained under Peshmerga control until 2017 and were defended on numerous occasions against ISIS offensives.

2015 VOA report about Peshmerga fighting IS south of Erbil

In the second half of 2014, however, the Peshmerga proved unable to hold their newly gained positions to Iraqi Kurdistan's west (Nineveh Plains/Nineveh governorate), including Sinjar, which was followed by widespread massacres committed by the Islamic State, including the Yazidi genocide. After initially withdrawing, with the regional capital Erbil coming within approximately 30 minutes of an Islamic State advance, the Peshmerga later counterattacked and recaptured the entire Erbil governorate, large areas to Iraqi Kurdistan's west, in Nineveh Governorate, and to Iraqi Kurdistan's south, in the Diyala and Kirkuk governorates. These operations were carried out in coordination with U.S. air support and Kurdish forces from the People’s Protection Units (YPG) and the Kurdistan Workers’ Party (PKK), which cooperated with the Peshmerga during several offensives in Nineveh Governorate, including the Sinjar offensives. The Sinjar offensives marked one of the first cross-border military collaborations between Kurdish forces from different parts of Kurdistan in the 21st century.

In September 2014, during the Siege of Kobani, approximately 300 Peshmerga fighters were deployed to Syrian Kurdistan to assist Kurdish forces there, marking the first official deployment of the Peshmerga outside Iraq. Equipped with heavy weaponry, the Peshmerga crossed two international borders and were greeted by large crowds of Kurds in Turkey during their transit.

According to Myles B. Caggins III, the Senior Spokesperson for the Global Coalition to Defeat ISIS at the time, the Peshmerga made the "ultimate sacrifice" in the war Against the Islamic State with over 1,300 Peshmerga fighters being killed, and upwards of 8,000 being wounded. As stated by a report of the German Federal Office for Migration and Refugees, the Peshmerga are seen by locals as heroes due to their involvement in the fight against ISIS.

=== Post-2017 reforms ===
Following the defeat of ISIS in 2017, conflicts with the Iraqi government, supported by Shi'ite militas and the IRGC renewed, leading to the 2017 Iraqi–Kurdish conflict.

Post-ISIS Peshmerga reforms focused on unification and modernization. In September 2022, the U.S. and KRG renewed a MoU to create a unified, nonpartisan force under MoPA command by 2026, including disbanding partisan Units 70 and 80, establishing two Area Commands and 11 light infantry divisions, and achieving a planned strength of 138,000. By mid-2025, four divisions were operational, biometric enrollment exceeded 85%, and unification entered its final phase, with completion expected by year-end. Advancements included the 2025 'Peshmerga Medical Force Readiness Initiative' and proposals for air defense systems. Continued Coalition support via CTEF provided stipends, vehicles, and equipment. However, progress has been slowed by KDP-PUK division, ISIS' threat, and disputes with the central government in Baghdad.

== Structure ==
=== Party affiliations ===
The Peshmerga are mostly divided among forces loyal to the Kurdistan Democratic Party (KDP) and those loyal to the Patriotic Union of Kurdistan (PUK), while other, minor Kurdish parties such as the Kurdistan Socialist Democratic Party also have their own small Peshmerga units. The Kurdistan Islamic Movement also had its own Peshmerga unit, which became an official Peshmerga branch during the Iran-Iraq war, and was disarmed in 2003. In daily life and the media, Peshmerga are referred to as Peshmerga i parti (KDP) or Peshmerga i yaketi (PUK) – i.e., KDP peshmerga or PUK Peshmerga. The KDP and PUK do not disclose information about the composition of their forces with government or media. Thus there is no reliable number of how many Peshmerga fighters exist. Media outlets have speculated that there are between 150,000 and 200,000 Peshmerga, but this number is highly disputed. The Peshmerga are divided into a KDP-governed "yellow" zone covering Dohuk Governorate and Erbil Governorate and a PUK-governed "green" zone covering Sulaymaniyah Governorate and Halabja Governorate. Each zone has its own branch of Peshmerga with their own governing institutions that do not coordinate with the other branch.

=== Unification efforts ===
As a result of the split nature of the Peshmerga forces, there is no central command center in charge of the entire force, and Peshmerga units instead follow separate military hierarchies depending on political allegiance. Multiple unification and depoliticizing efforts of the Peshmerga have been made since 1992. Many deadlines have been missed, reforms have been watered down, and most of the Peshmerga are still under the influence and command of the KDP and the PUK.

==== Ministry of Peshmerga Affairs ====
After gaining autonomy in 1991 the Kurdistan Region created its own proto-defence ministry: The Ministry of Peshmerga Affairs (MoPA). The Ministry was established to professionalize, unify, and centralize command of the party-affiliated Peshmerga forces, but in its early years it lacked real authority, something that became evident during the Kurdish civil war. Following the end of the civil war the KDP and PUK agreed to the re-establishment of the unified Ministry of Peshmerga Affairs, which was favoured by the overall KRG Unification Agreement, and formally took place in 2006. In January 2010, the MoPA created the first, to itself subordinate, integrated Peshmerga brigade, called a Regional Guard Brigade (RGB). Three more RGBs were formed in March of the same year. Mario Fumerton and Wladimir van Wilgenburg commented, "The KDP’s temporary alliance with Saddam Hussein to expel the PUK from Erbil in 1996 is still remembered as a grave betrayal; conversely, many KDP members recall being driven out of other territories by the PUK. In part for these reasons, each side keeps a portion of its own forces under direct party control as a final guarantee to maintain the balance of power."

In 2016 and 2017, following the events of the Iraqi Civil War, the United States and several European nations pressured the PUK and KDP to set up more mixed brigades as a condition for aid and funding. The PUK and KDP united 12 to 14 brigades under the RGB, which were then placed under the command of the Ministry of Peshmerga Affairs. The Netherlands, the US, the UK, and Germany form the Multi-National Advisory Group (MNAG) that supports the project to establish a "modern, effective, affordable, and accountable Peshmerga." In addition, to support reform efforts, the United Kingdom appointed a Special Defence Adviser to the MoPA.

In 2022, the KDP's 1st Support Force and the PUK's 2nd Support Force were integrated into the MoPA, a move described by Col. Todd Burroughs, deputy director of the US-led coalition's Military Advisor Group North, as a 'significant step in the Peshmerga reform process.'

==== 2022 Memorandum of understanding ====
A major step towards unification was reached in 2022, when a four-year memorandum of understanding (MoU) between the US Department of Defense and Ministry of Peshmerga Affairs was signed, outlining conditions and timelines for integration into MoPA, effective until September 2026.

By 2025, unification was in its final phase, with 10 additional brigades formed, two command regions planned, and salary payments digitialized via the 'MyAccount' system. An Inspector General Report for Operation Inherent Resolve report noted progress in establishing four divisions, but highlighted delays in the development of Area Commands and persistent partisanship. As of Q2 2025, 28 Regional Guard Brigades were unified, 4 divisions operational, biometric enrollment exceeded 85%, and a four-year budget was submitted for a 138,000-strong force. Salary digitization via 'MyAccount' was nearing completion.

==== Future outlook ====
In spite of all reforms, officers partially still continue to report to and take orders from their party leaders who also control the deployment of forces loyal to them and appoint front-line and sector commanders. Critical reforms stalled include the full incorporation of Units 80 and 70, and additional division HQs, amid U.S. frustration over partisanship. Peshmerga officials repeatedly affirm that full unification will be completed by 2026, if not sooner and U.S. officials stress that they will continue supporting unifying efforts.

=== Combat Forces ===
Both the KDP and the PUK Peshmerga rely heavily on irregulars in times of conflict to increase their ranks. However, both maintain several professional military brigades. The Peshmerga forces are described as a secular force with a Muslim majority and smaller Assyrian, Chaldean Catholic, Yazidi, Shabak and Kaka'i units. Though some units are composed of minorities, they are not segregated and serve in regular infantry divisions too. In 2016 the MoPA intended to create a military division for the Arabs and Turkmen of Kirkuk Province, but financial difficulties halted the project. Most minority units have been formed, when the Peshmerga took over the disputed territories in the War against the Islamic State.

The following units are affiliated with or have been identified within the Peshmerga force:

Force	Estimated size	Command	Description
MoPA-affiliated units
Regional Guard Brigades (RGB)	73,000 (as of 2025, with 28 unified brigades)	Şoreş Îsmaîl	MoPA's main force. Supposedly apolitical.
1st Support Forces Command	10,000 combined with the 2nd Support Forces.	Lt. Gen. Sihad Barzani	Transferred to MoPA from KDP in 2022. Focuses on support roles, including artillery and officer training.
2nd Support Forces Command	10,000 combined with the 1st Support Forces.	Maj. Gen. Mariwan Muhammed Amin	Transferred to the MoPA from PUK in 2022. Focuses on support roles.
KDP-affiliated units
80 Unit	50,000–60,000	Najat Ali Salih	KDP. In process of integration into MoPA by 2026.
Zeravani	51,000–120,000 active personnel and 250,000 reservists	Masoud Barzani	KDP's militarized police force.
Gulan Forces	6,000 (2016)	Mansour Barzani	Commanded by Mansour Barzani.
Peshmerga Roj	3,000–6,000 fighters	Ibrahim Biro and Brig. Gen. Mohammed Rejeb Dehdo	Military wing of the ENKS. Consists of Kurds from Syria. Located in the KRG, Pro-KDP and takes orders from Masoud Barzani.
Counter Terrorism Department (Kurdistan Region)	N/A	N/A	Counterterrorism unit part of the Kurdistan Region Security Council.
Barzan Forces	N/A	N/A	Brigade formation, consisting of men recruited from the Barzani clan. Its also known as Barzan Army.
Black Tiger unit	N/A	Sirwan Barzani	Formed to confront the Islamic State in 2014 under Sirwan Barzani, who carries the nickname 'Black Tiger'.
Presidential Guard (Kurdistan Region)	N/A	Nechirvan Barzani	Military unit tasked with protecting the President of Kurdistan Region.
PUK-affiliated units
70 Unit	50,000–60,000	Sheikh Jaafar Sheikh Mustafa	PUK. In process of integration into MoPA by 2026.
Defense and Emergency Forces (DEF)	32,000	N/A	PUK's equivalent of KDP's Zeravani. They are also known as Black Forces.
CTG Kurdistan	5,000	Wehab Helebcî	
Hezekani Kosrat Rasul	2,000–3,000	Kosrat Rasul Ali	Kosrat Rasul Ali's personal protection brigade, one of the last remaining units to defend during the Kirkuk crisis.
Kurdistan Commando Forces	500–10,000	Diyar Omar	Well-equipped Commando unit.
Golden Force	N/A	Barham Sheikh Mohammed	Sub-unit of the Kurdistan Commando Forces.
Presidential Peshmerga Brigade	N/A	Hero Ibrahim Ahmed (Jalal Talabani formerly)	A unit which was stationed in Baghdad during the presidency of Jalal Talabani.
Minority units
Êzîdxan Protection Force or "Yazidi Peshmerga"	7,000–8,000–10,000	Haydar Shesho and Qasim Shesho	Pro-KDP. Yazidi Democratic Party. Incorporated into MoPA.
Jazeera Brigade	2,000	Brig. Gen. Bolond Hussayn	Brigade of Ethnic-Arabs from Zummar and Rabia. Affiliated with the MoPA. Formed by the KDP.
Battalion of the Assyrian Democratic Movement	~ 360 (1993), ~ 2,000 (2014)	William Ishaya (formerly)	Neutral between the KDP and PUK. Affiliated with the MoPA. Military wing of the Assyrian Democratic Movement.
Nineveh Plain Guard Forces (NPGF) or "Christian Peshmerga"	1,500–2,500	Sarkis Aghajan Mamendo (unconfirmed)	Pro-KDP. Affiliated with the MoPA. Chaldean Syriac Assyrian Popular Council.
Shabak Battalion	~ 1,000	Col. Mahmood Shabak	Battalion made up of the Shabak minority.
Kaka'i Battalion	~ 680 (August 2015)	Nezar and Adel Kakai	Battalion made up of the Kaka'i religious minority. Affiliated with the MoPA.
Tiger Guards	~ 600 (March 2015)	N/A	Christian brigade under the authority of the KRG.
Nineveh Plains Force (NPF)	~ 500 (July 2015)	Romeo Hakari	Pro-KDP. Affiliated with the MoPA. Bet-Nahrain Democratic Party.
Dwekh Nawsha	~ 100–250	Lt. Col. Odisho	Pro-KDP. Military wing of the Assyrian Patriotic Party. Not as clearly acting as official sub-units of Kurdish forces as the NPGF or NPF.
Asayish (security force)
KDP Asayish	Unknown	Barzan Qassab	KDP. Affiliated with the Ministry of Interior.
PUK Asayish	Unknown	N/A	PUK. Affiliated with the Ministry of Interior.
PUK Asayish SWAT units	Unknown	N/A	PUK.
Others
KDPS Peshmerga	3,000	N/A	Peshmerga force of the Kurdistan Social Democratic Party.

==== Specialized Units ====
The Peshmerga Media Cell is one of the specialized units of the MoPA. Established in January 2022, it was created to professionalize the force's information and media operations. The unit acts as the official channel for statements on Peshmerga activities, with responsibilities that include safeguarding operational security, protecting journalists reporting from conflict zones, and ensuring the dissemination of accurate information to local and international audiences. It has also received support from international coalition advisers in developing media and information management practices.

=== Peshmerga in the Iraqi Army ===
Due to limited funding and the vast size of the Peshmerga forces, the KRG planned to downsize its forces from large numbers of low-quality forces to a smaller but much more effective and well-trained force. Consequently, in 2009, the KRG and Baghdad engaged in discussions about incorporating parts of the Peshmerga forces into the Iraqi Army in what would be the 15th and 16th Iraqi Army divisions. However, after increasing tension between Erbil and Baghdad regarding the disputed areas, the transfer was largely put on hold. Some Peshmerga were already transferred but reportedly deserted again, and there are allegations that former Peshmerga forces remained loyal to the KRG rather than their Iraqi chain of command; regardless, thousands of members of the 80 Unit of KDP and the 70 Unit of PUK are based in Baghdad and cooperate well with other Iraqi forces.

The Presidential Peshmerga Brigade of the PUK was stationed in Baghdad and paid by the Iraqi government during the presidency of Jalal Talabani.

=== Ranks ===
In the Kurdistan Region, Peshmerga officers can be commissioned through one of two military academies: Zakho Military College or Qalachwalan Military College. Officers can be promoted by the President of the Kurdistan Region for outstanding military and civil achievements.

The Peshmerga, despite wearing a variety of uniform types, consistently maintain proper standards of dress. This includes the correct display of rank insignia for both enlisted personnel and commissioned officers, as well as the proper wear of headgear. In addition, they have designated ceremonial and duty uniforms that project a highly professional appearance.

== Inventory and capabilities ==
Peshmerga forces largely rely on old arms captured from battles. The Peshmerga captured large stockpiles of weapons during the 1991 Iraqi uprisings. Several stockpiles of weapons were captured from the old Iraqi Army during the 2003 U.S. invasion of Iraq, in which Peshmerga forces were active. Following the retreat of the new Iraqi Army during the June 2014 Islamic State offensive, Peshmerga forces reportedly again managed to get hold of weapons left behind by the Iraqis. Since August 2014, Peshmerga forces have also captured weapons from the Islamic State.

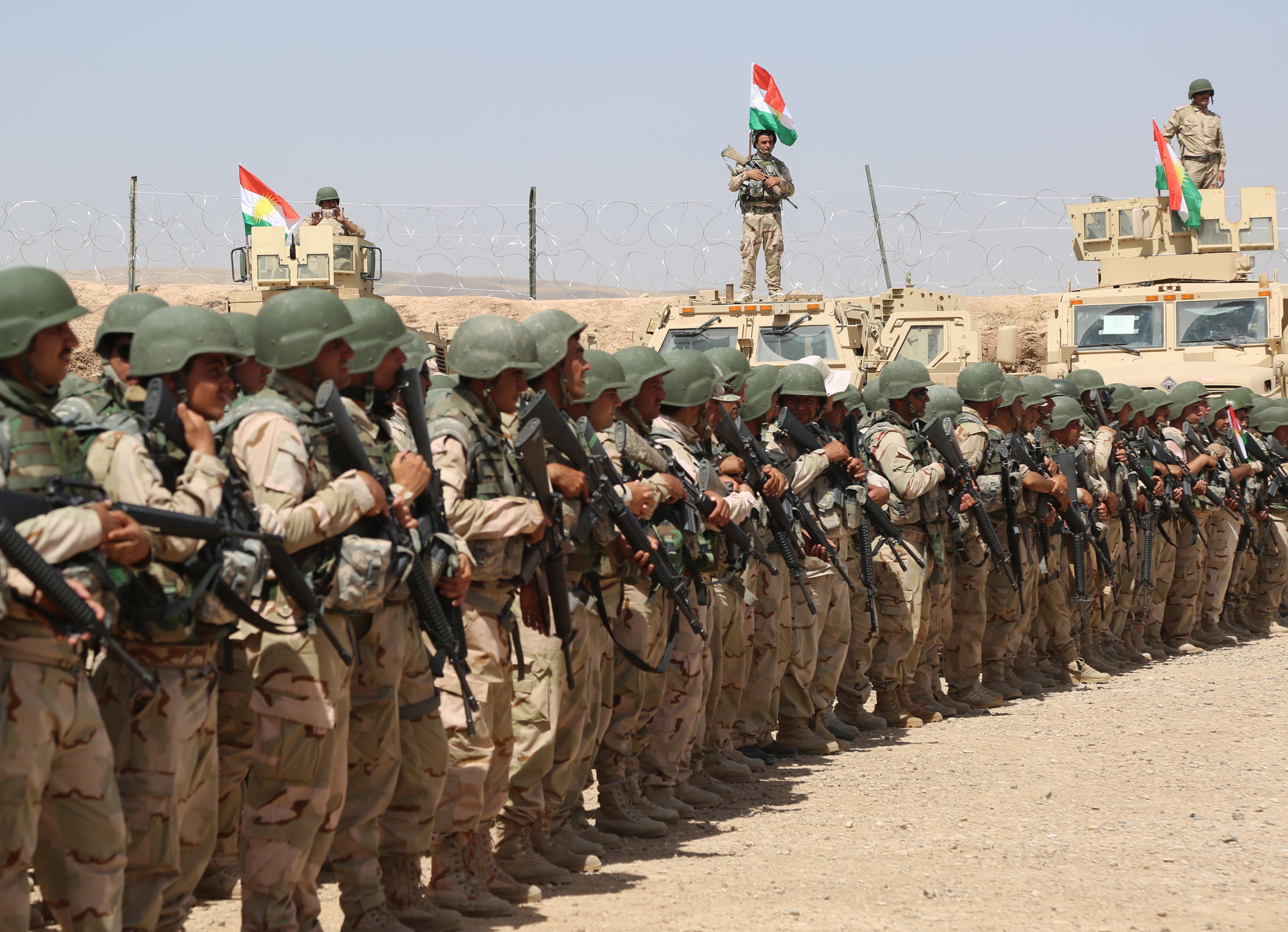
Peshmerga soldiers stand in formation during the Modern Brigade Course graduation ceremony.

The Peshmerga arsenal is limited and confined by restrictions because the Kurdish Region has to purchase arms through the Iraqi government. Due to disputes between the KRG and the Iraqi government, arms flows from Baghdad to Kurdistan Region have been almost nonexistent, as Baghdad fears Kurdish aspirations for independence. After the Islamic State offensive of August 2014, multiple governments armed the Peshmerga with light arms, night-vision devices, and ammunition. However, Kurdish officials and Peshmerga stressed that they were not receiving enough and Baghdad was blocking arms from reaching the KRG, emphasizing the need for weapons to be sent directly and not through Baghdad. In this context, in July 2016, US Acting Assistant Secretary of Defense Elissa Slotkin signed a memorandum with the KRG providing for direct funding of the Peshmerga without routing the funds through Baghdad. Despite this, the US has maintained that the government of Iraq is responsible for the security of Iraqi Kurdistan and that Baghdad must approve all military aid.

The Peshmerga lack a proper medical corps and communication units. This became apparent during the Islamic State offensive in 2014 where the Peshmerga found itself lacking ambulances and frontline field hospitals, forcing wounded fighters to walk back to safety. There is also a lack of communication tools, as Peshmerga commanders are forced to use civilian cellphones to communicate with each other. Under the guidance of the US-led coalition the Peshmerga started to standardize its weapons systems, replacing Soviet-era weapons with NATO firearms. In 2015, for the first time, Peshmerga soldiers received urban warfare and military intelligence training from foreign trainers of the CJTF–OIR. Some Peshmerga of the MoPA have also been trained by American private military contractors like DynCorp. By 2025, advancements included the Peshmerga Medical Force Readiness Initiative to address field hospital shortages. As of 2025, continued CTEF support provided vehicles, heavy equipment, small arms, ammunition, and non-lethal aid, with proposals for air defenses in the 2024 NDAA.

== Controversies ==
Peshmerga has been accused of corruption, partisanship, nepotism and fraud.

=== Corruption and partisan control ===
In addition the KDP and PUK have used the Peshmerga to exert a monopoly on the use of force within their zones. In 2011 KDP Peshmerga fired on anti-government protesters in Sulaymaniyah, and the PUK later used its own security forces to break up these protests, leading to criticism from all of the opposition parties in the Kurdistan Region Parliament. In 2014 the KDP used its Peshmerga forces to stop delegates from the Gorran Movement to enter Erbil and attend parliament.

Concerns about persistent partisanship remain. In 2025, U.S. reports expressed frustration over stalled unification due to party lines, despite commitments.

The Peshmerga was accused of listing "ghost employees" who do not exist or do not show up for work, but receive salaries. Those setting up the scam split the salary with these employees.

=== Abandonment of Yazidis in Shingal (2014) ===
On 3 August 2014, as ISIL attacked Sinjar District, the roughly 8,000 Peshmerga stationed in the district's Yazidi towns and villages withdrew without engaging ISIL forces, and Sinjar City's administration was handed over orderly, with offices and official buildings, as well as even official records, relinquished to the new ISIL powerholders without resistance. The decision to withdraw was not effectively communicated to the local population, no evacuation orders were issued, and most villages were unaware of the collapse in security until ISIL fighters arrived. The episode is described in academic and journalistic sources as the abandonment of the Yazidis of Sinjar, and interviewed four days after the attack, Yazidi militia founder Sheikh Khairy Khedr called it "a betrayal of the Yazidi which we will not forget". The withdrawal is widely cited as a precipitating factor in the Sinjar massacre and the genocide of Yazidis that followed.

In the weeks beforehand, Sarbast Babiri, the Kurdistan Democratic Party (KDP) official overseeing Peshmerga security in Sinjar, had publicly pledged that Peshmerga forces would "defend Shingal down to the last drop of their blood". He and the KDP leadership nonetheless refused a request by local Yazidi politician Haydar Shesho to arm and organise a roughly 3,500-strong Yazidi self-defence force, and Peshmerga security personnel separately confiscated most of the weapons Yazidi soldiers had retained after Iraqi army, police and border-guard units in the area dissolved.

The top security and administrative positions in Sinjar were consistently held by Muslim Kurds rather than by Yazidis, the district's majority population. According to Barber, Babiri "was ultimately responsible for all security" in Sinjar, and the Peshmerga generals responsible for troops in the district at the time were, like Babiri, all Muslim Kurdish rather than Yazidi or local to Sinjar.

Explanations for the withdrawal have differed. Some Peshmerga sources attributed it to being outgunned relative to ISIL forces, which had captured heavy weapons and armoured vehicles from fleeing Iraqi Army units after the fall of Mosul two months earlier. Shesho has disputed this account, arguing that the Peshmerga's confiscation of Yazidi weapons meant they were, if anything, better armed than before, and that the retreat was militarily unnecessary. The Kurdistan Region's own military spokesman at the time, Brigadier General Halgurd Hikmat, similarly rejected the tactical-retreat framing, stating there had been "categorically no order to withdraw from any front" and attributing it to negligence.

Sinjar's KDP-aligned Peshmerga units withdrew from the district a second time in October 2017, in the aftermath of the Kurdistan independence referendum. On 17 October 2017, one day after Kurdish forces evacuated Kirkuk amid the confrontation with the Iraqi federal government that followed the referendum, PDK Peshmerga began withdrawing from Sinjar City, and by that afternoon had also withdrawn from the northern part of the district; the town of Sinûnê was subsequently taken over by the PKK-aligned YBŞ and its women's units, the YJŞ. Schmidinger notes that this second withdrawal was comparatively more orderly than the events of 2014, and that it was specifically the Muslim-majority, KDP-aligned Peshmerga units that retreated, whereas Haydar Shesho's HPÊ, a Yazidi-aligned Peshmerga-affiliated force, held its ground at Şerfedîn temple rather than withdrawing. The 2017 withdrawal further damaged the KDP's standing among Yazidis in Sinjar.

=== Treatment of minority communities ===
Outside of Kurdistan Region the Peshmerga has been criticized for using force to exert control of local Arab, Yazidi and Assyrian communities, particularly during the Iraqi Civil War.

== Role of women ==
=== Historic involvement ===
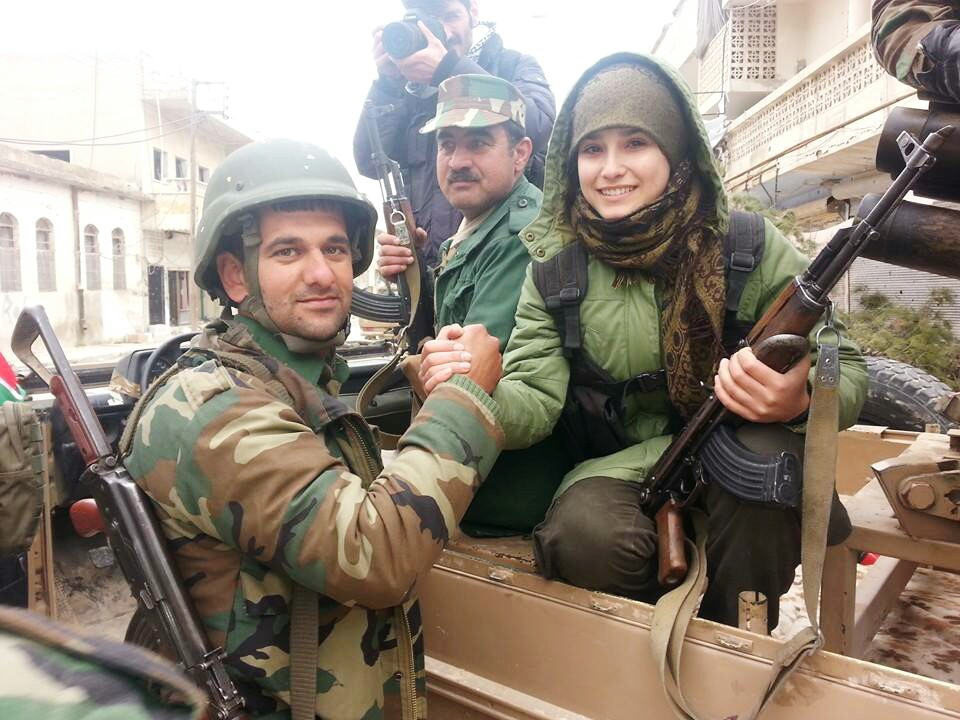
People's Defense Units' (YPG) woman volunteer with Peshmerga soldier

Women have played a significant role in the Peshmerga since its foundation, compared to other Middle Eastern militaries. The Kurdish Zand tribe was known for allowing women in military roles. During the Iraqi–Kurdish conflict the majority of women served within the Peshmerga in supporting roles such as building camps, taking care of the wounded, and carrying munitions and messages. Several women brigades served on the front lines. The PUK started recruiting women during the Kurdish Civil War. Women were given a 45-day basic training, which included parade drills and basic marksmanship training with various rifles, mortars, and RPGs.

=== Modern era ===
In the months leading up to the 2003 U.S. invasion of Iraq, the United States launched Operation Viking Hammer which dealt a huge blow to Islamic terrorist groups in Iraqi Kurdistan and uncovered a chemical weapons facility. The PUK later confirmed that female Kurdish fighters had participated in the operation.

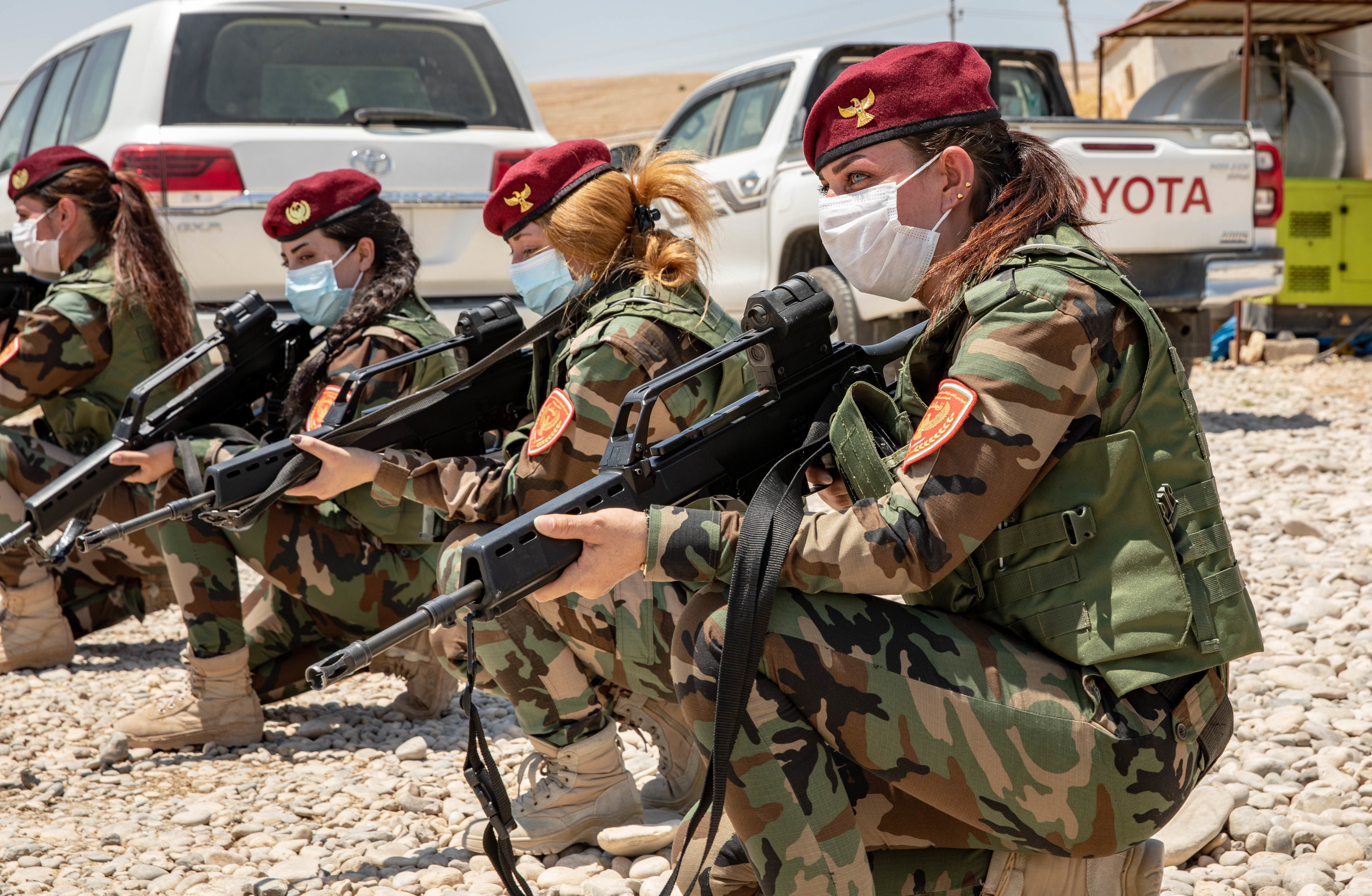
Female Peshmerga soldiers training with G36's

In 2014 the Peshmerga had at least 600 women in their ranks. The number of women increased significantly during the war against ISIS due to a shortage of manpower and the desire for revenge. The Peshmerga have one entirely female brigade. In the KDP, these Peshmerga women have been refused access to the frontline and are mostly used in logistics and management positions, while PUK Peshmerga women are deployed on the front lines and are actively engaging in combat. Women are paid the same as men.

=== Famous female fighters ===
Margaret George Malik was an iconic Assyrian guerilla fighter and commander within the Peshmerga who was given a leading position in important battles such as the Battle of Zawita Valley. She was nicknamed "Joan of Arc of Kurdistan" for the courage she displayed in combat. In 1995 Colonel Nahida Rashid created the first women's Peshmerga unit. Other well known female Peshmergas are Hero Ibrahim Ahmad, Amineh Kakabaveh, Pakhshan Zangana, and Kafiya Suleiman.

== Gallery ==
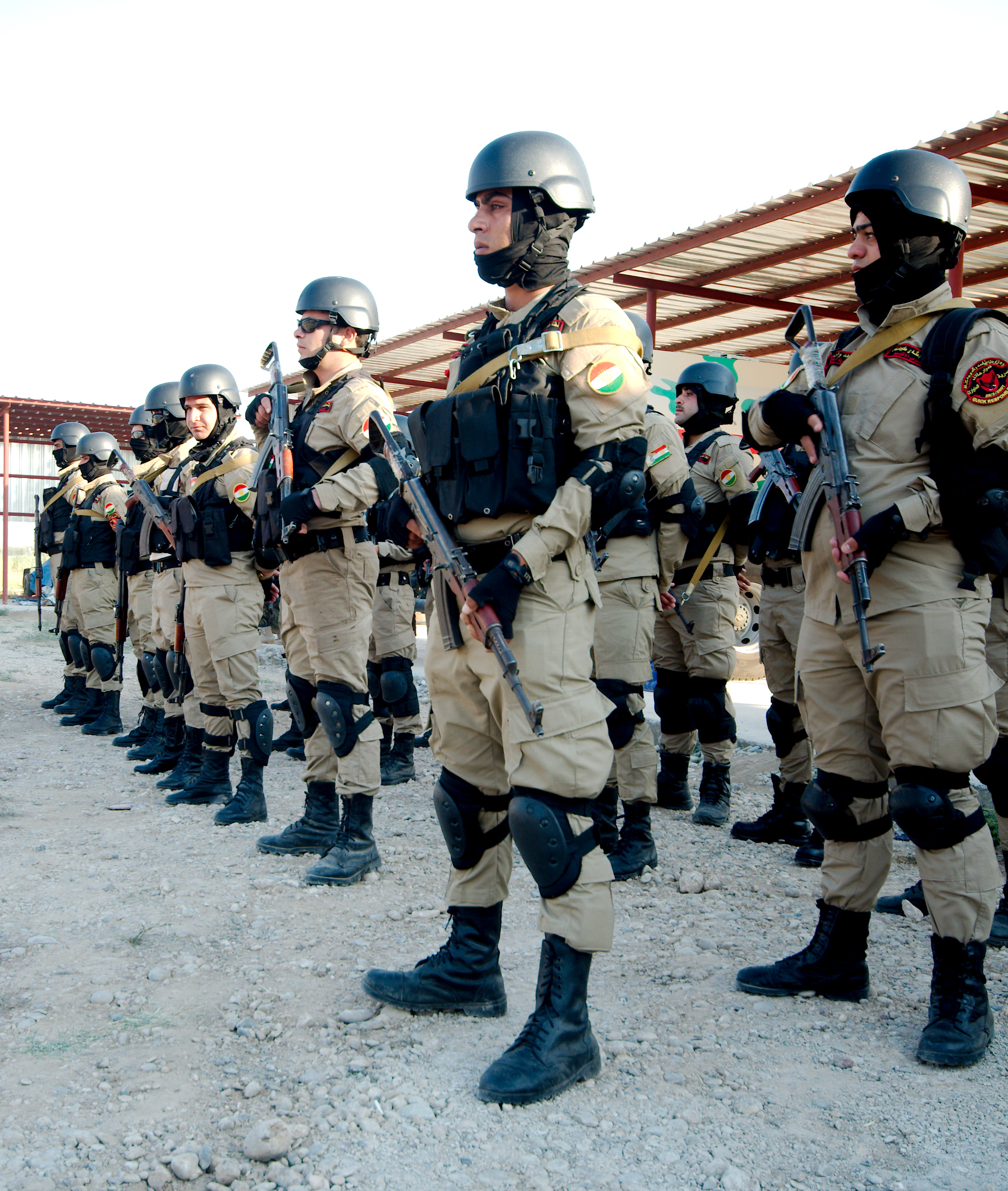
Peshmerga gathered near the Syrian border in 2014

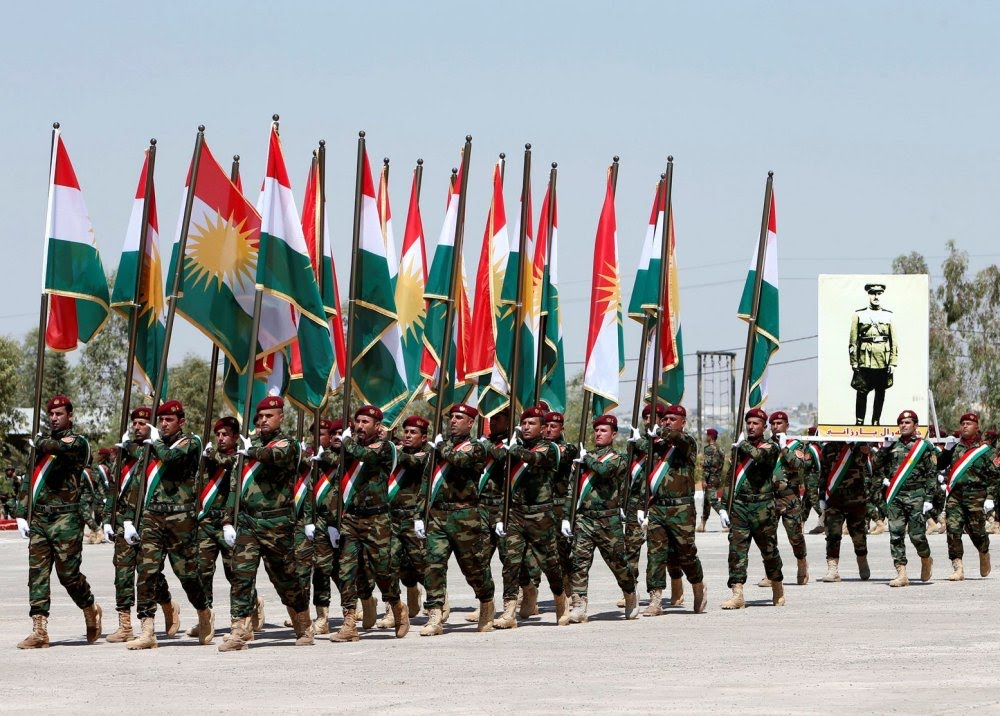
Peshmerga soldiers in ceremonial gear

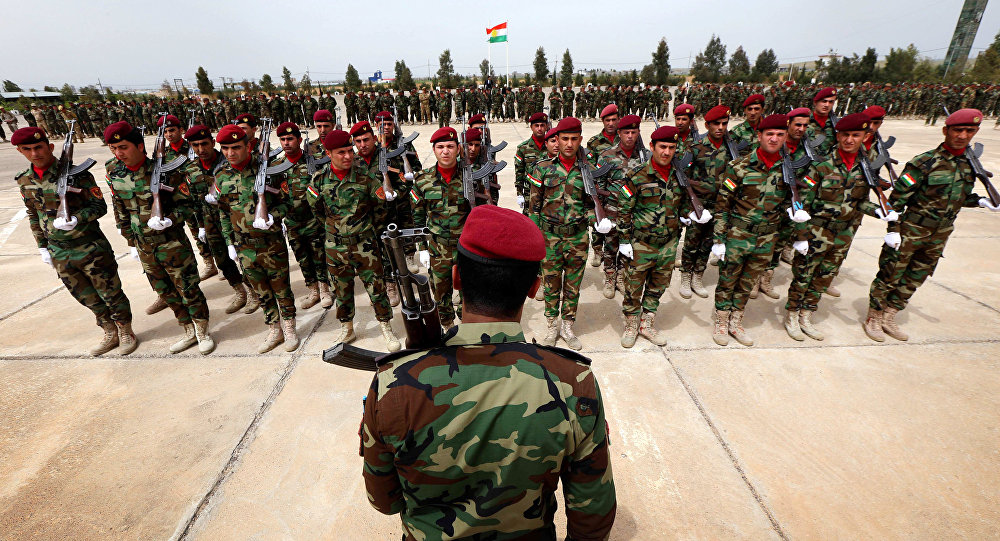
Peshmerga Parade

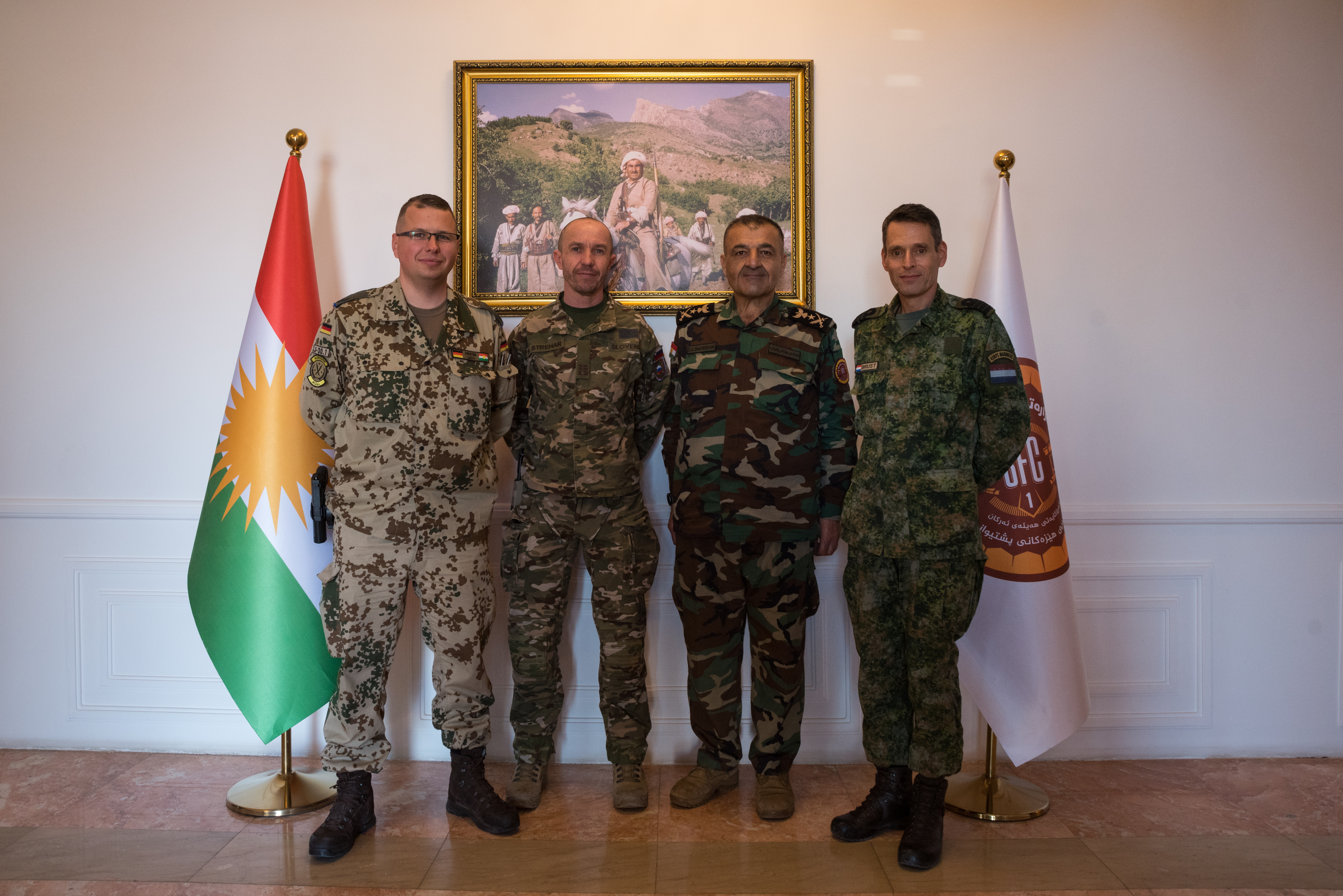
Peshmerga meet Anti-IS Coalition advisors
