= Military ranks of the Peshmerga =

The Military ranks of the Peshmerga are the military insignia used by the internal security forces of the Kurdistan Region, the Peshmerga.

== Current ranks ==
=== Commissioned officer ranks ===
The rank insignia of commissioned officers.

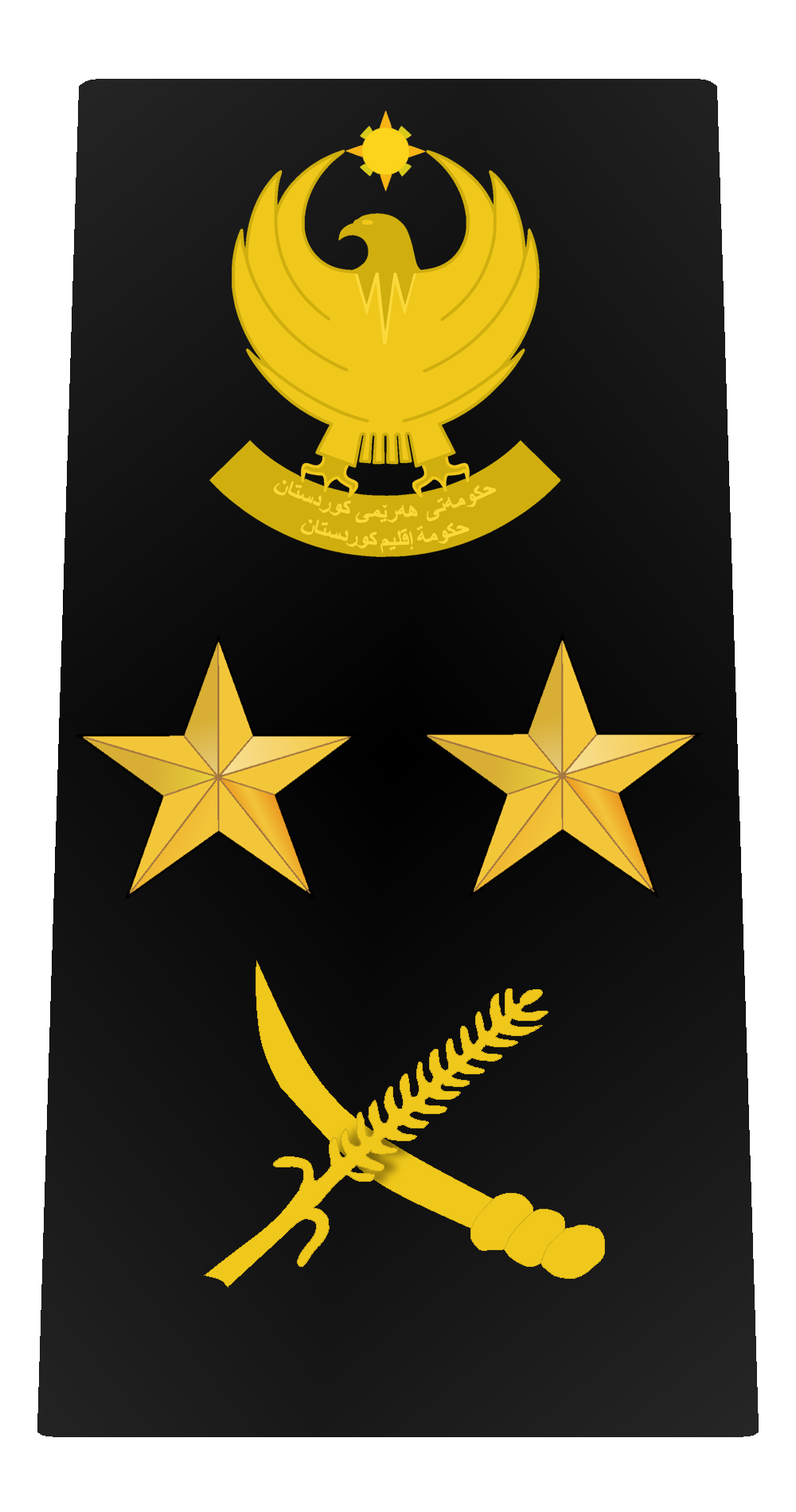
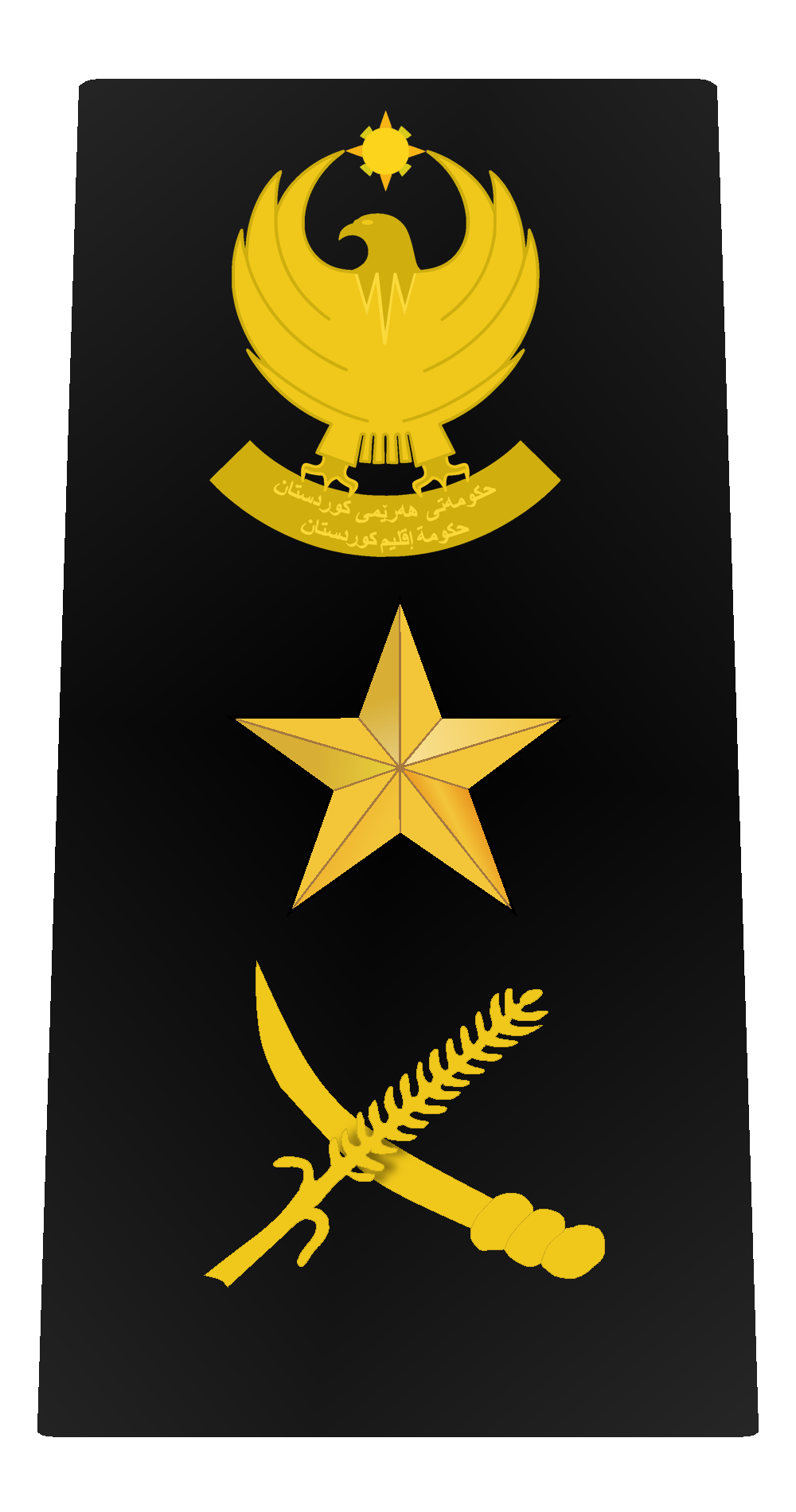
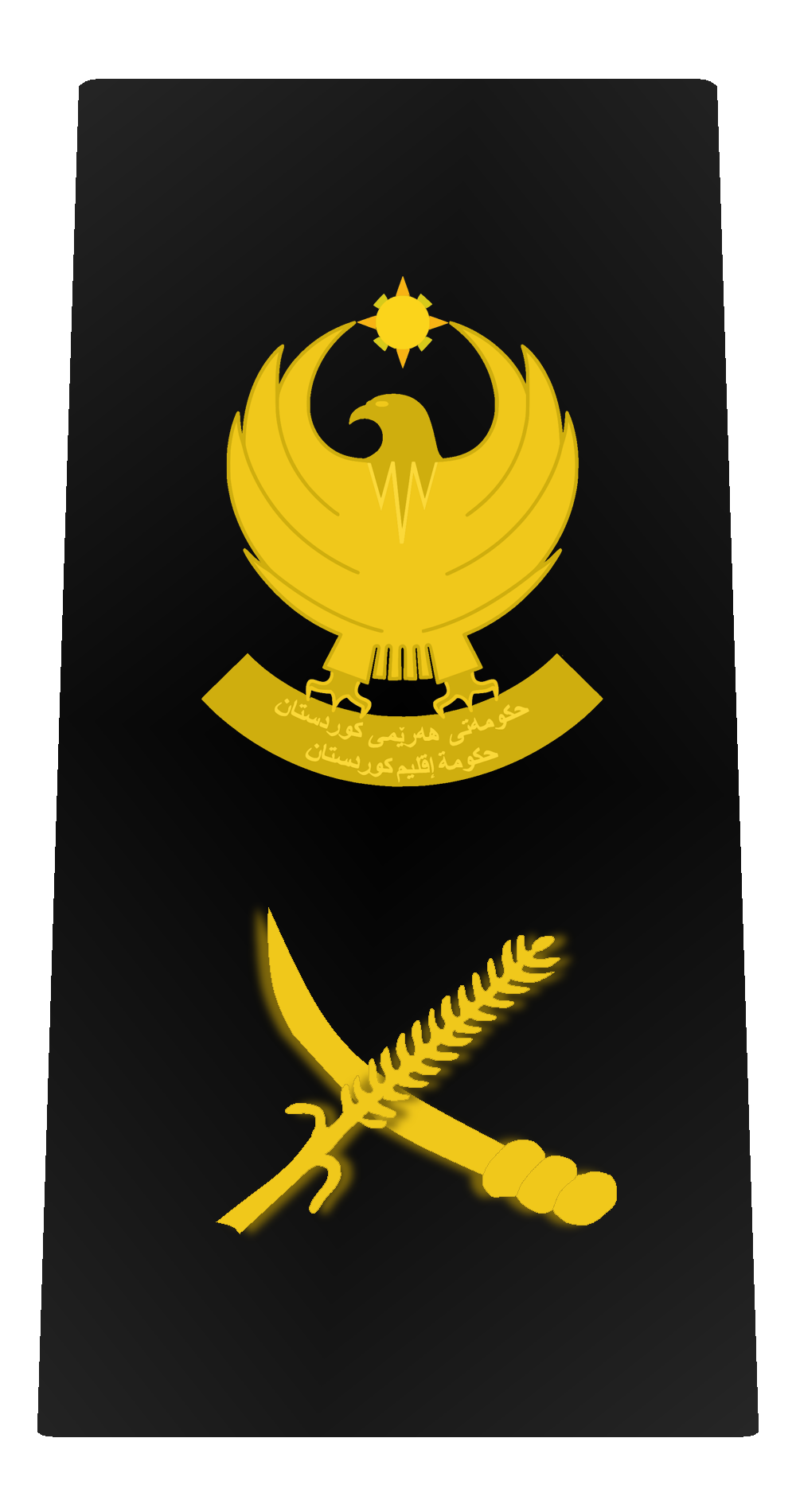
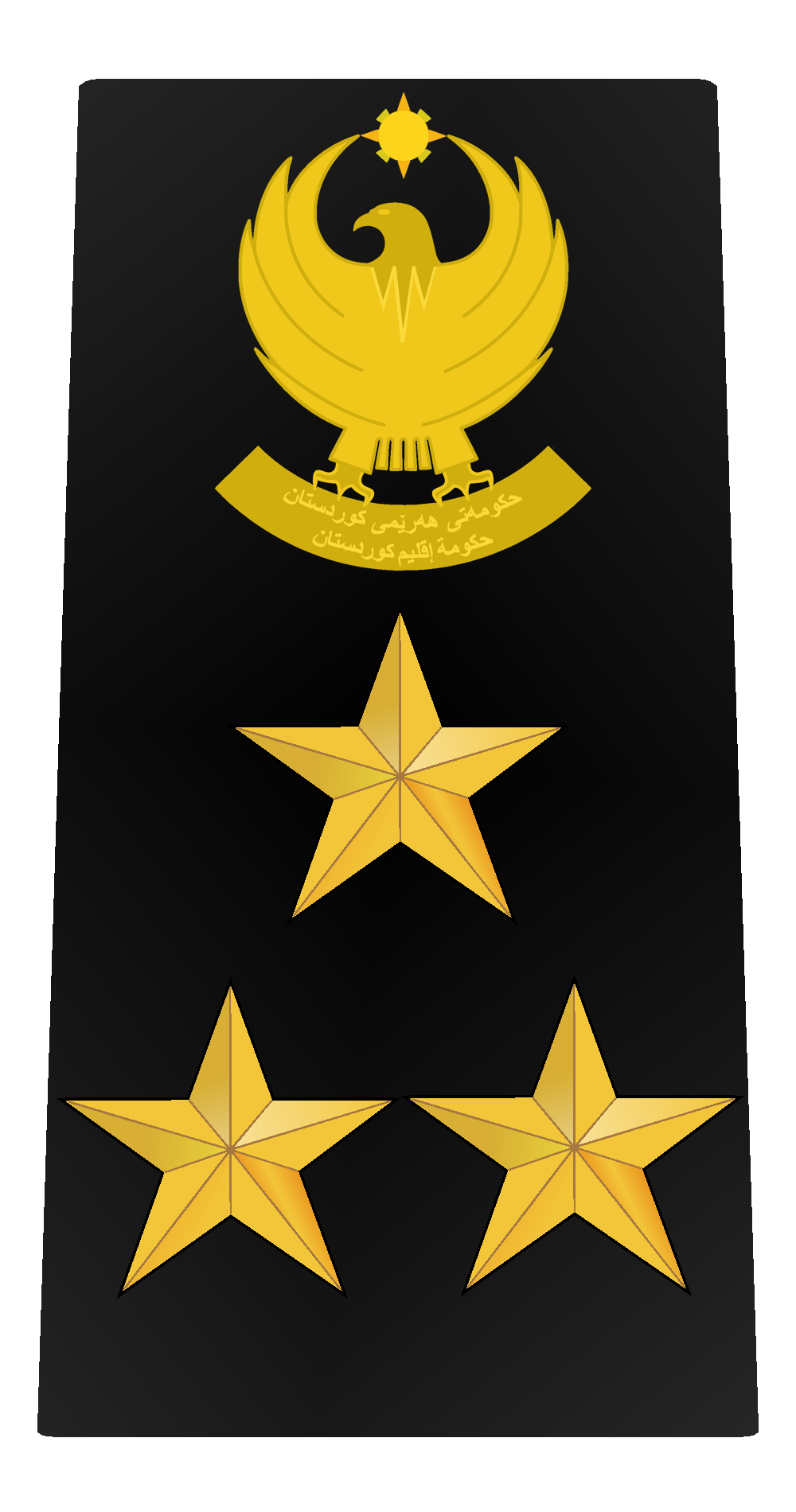
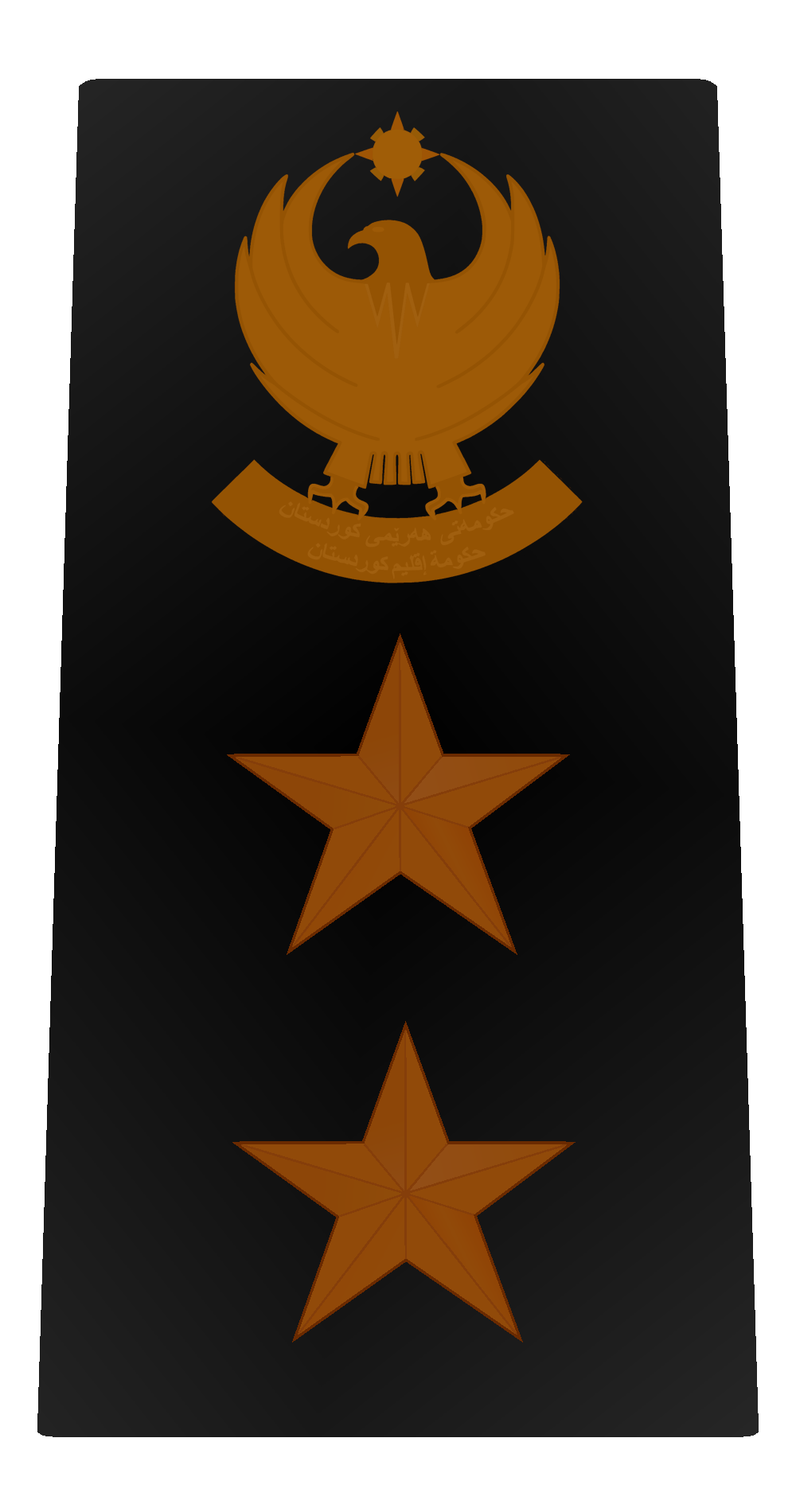
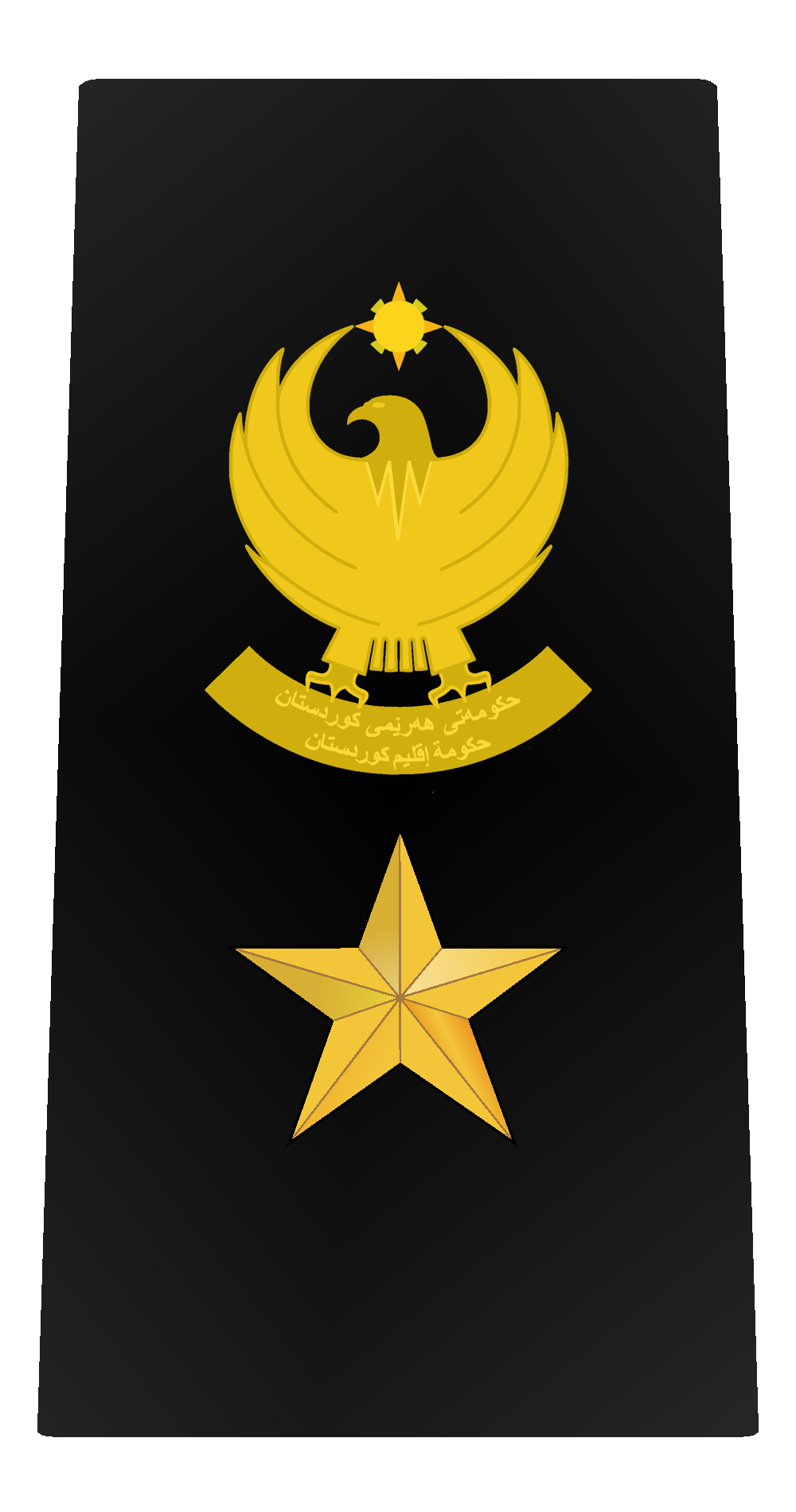
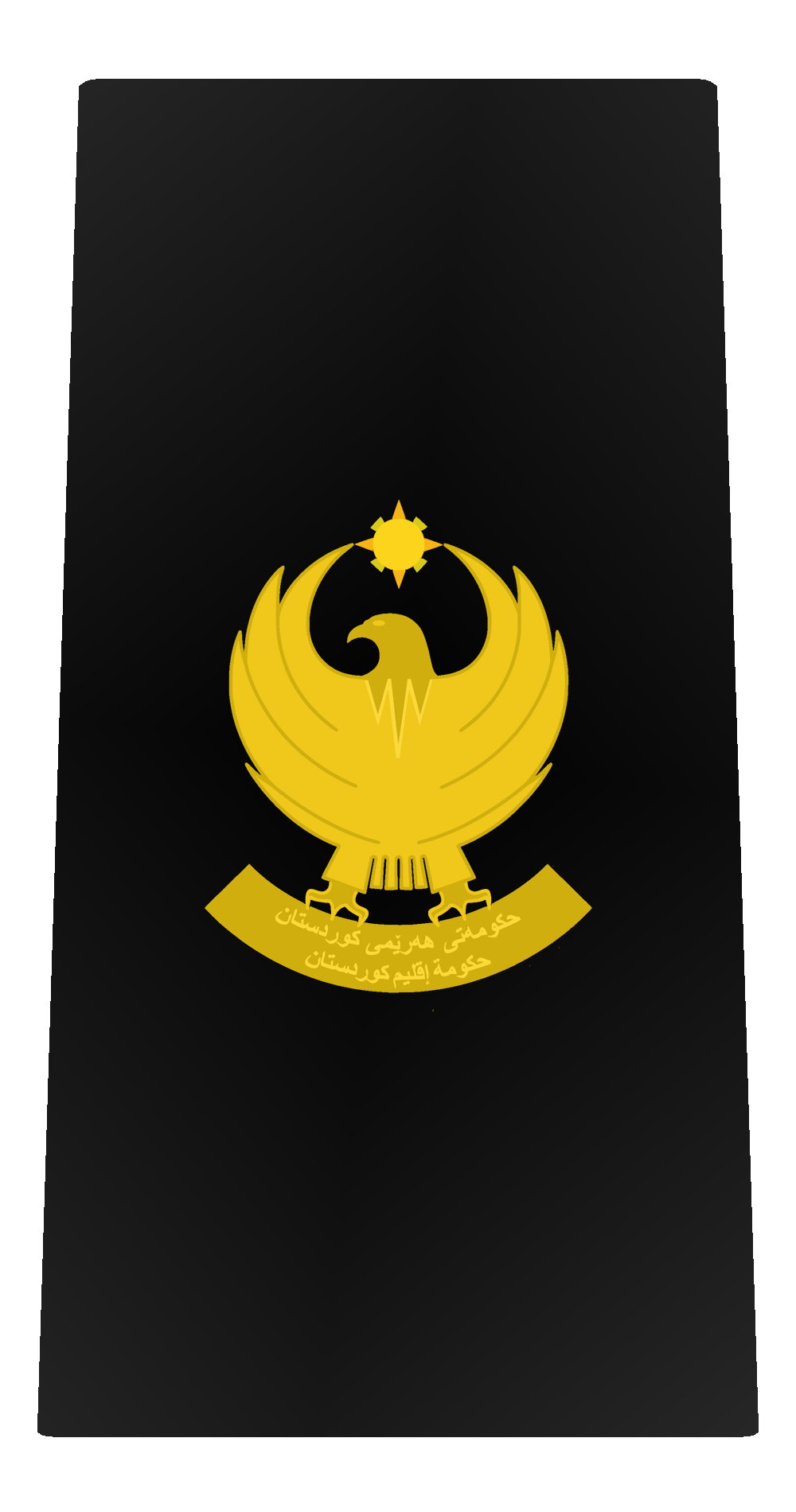
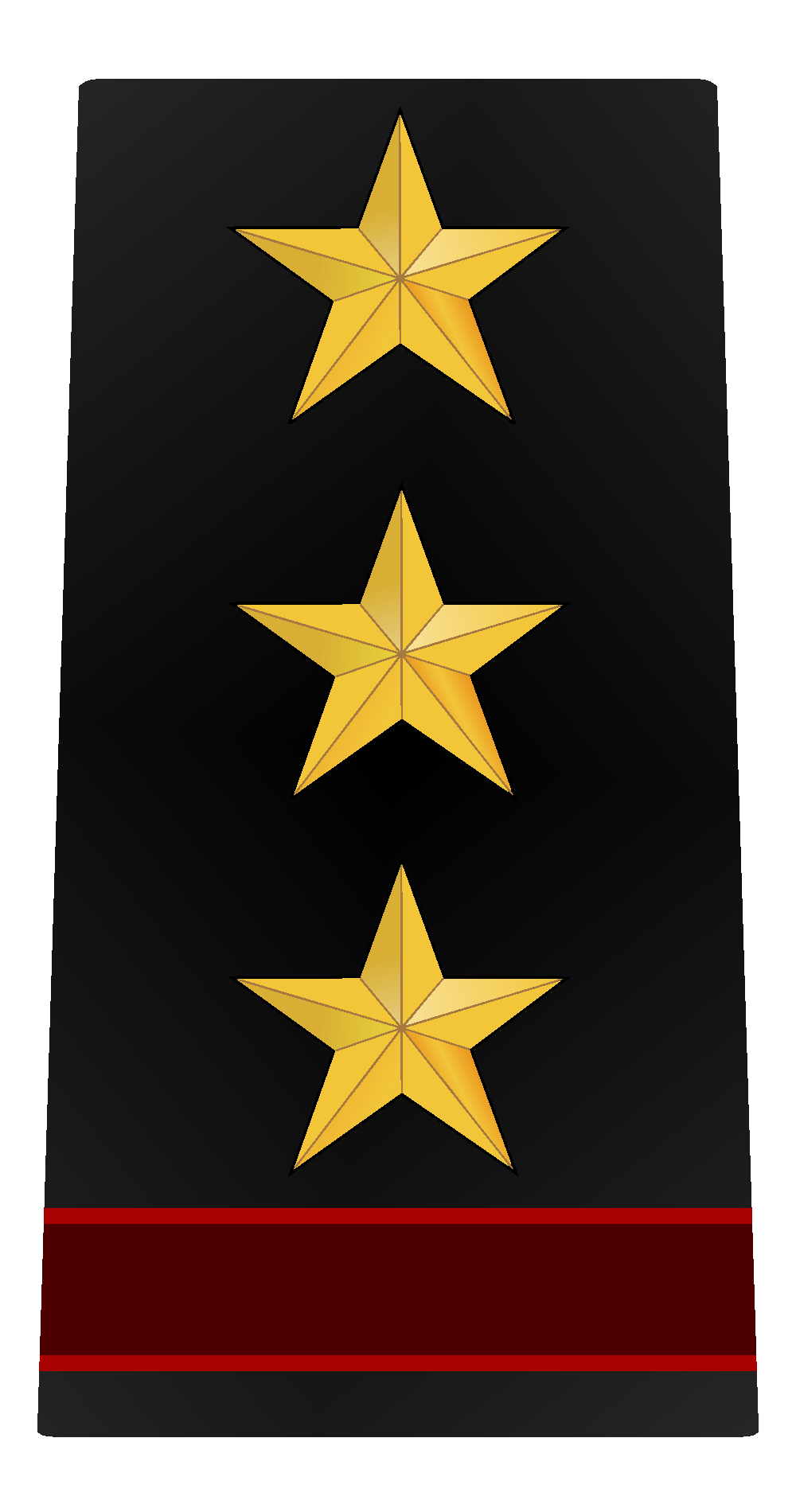
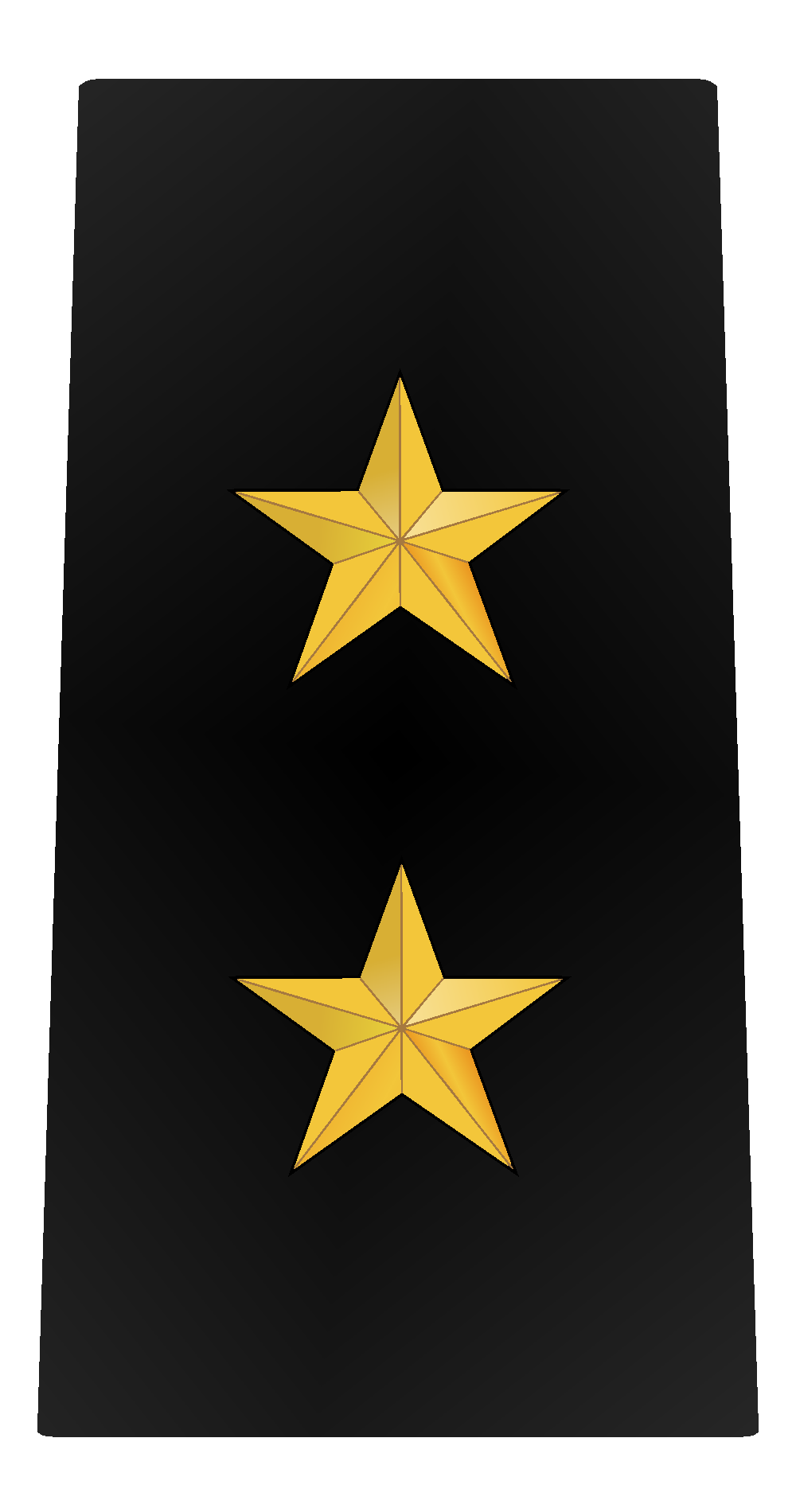
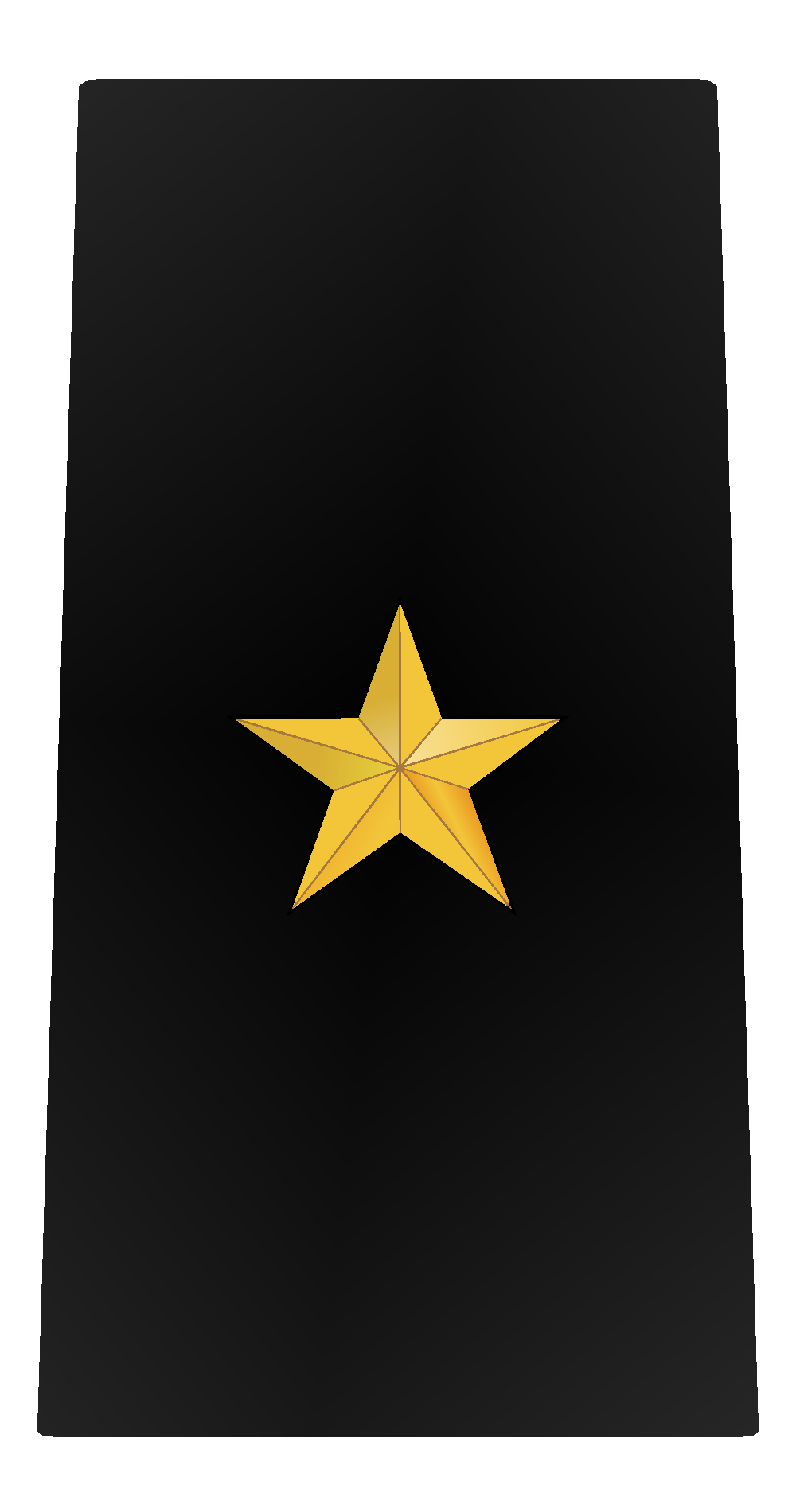
Rank group	General / flag officers				Senior officers			Junior officers
Rank	ژەنەڕاڵ	سەردار	سالار	سەرتیپ	سەرھەنگ	پێشکار	پێشڕەو	پێشەنگ	جێداری یەکەم	جێدار
Romanization	Jenerall	Serdar	Salar	Sertîp	Serheng	Pêşkar	Pêşřew	Pêşeng	Cêdarî Yekem	Cêdar
U.S. equivalent	General	Lieutenant General	Major General	Brigadier	Colonel	Lieutenant Colonel	Major	Captain	Lieutenant	Lieutenant 2nd Class
Insignia

== See also ==
- Ministry of Peshmerga Affairs
