= Ministry of Peshmerga Affairs =

Kurdistan Region ministry

- وەزارەتی کاروباری پێشمەرگە; Wezaretî Pêşmerge
- Emblem of the Kurdistan Region

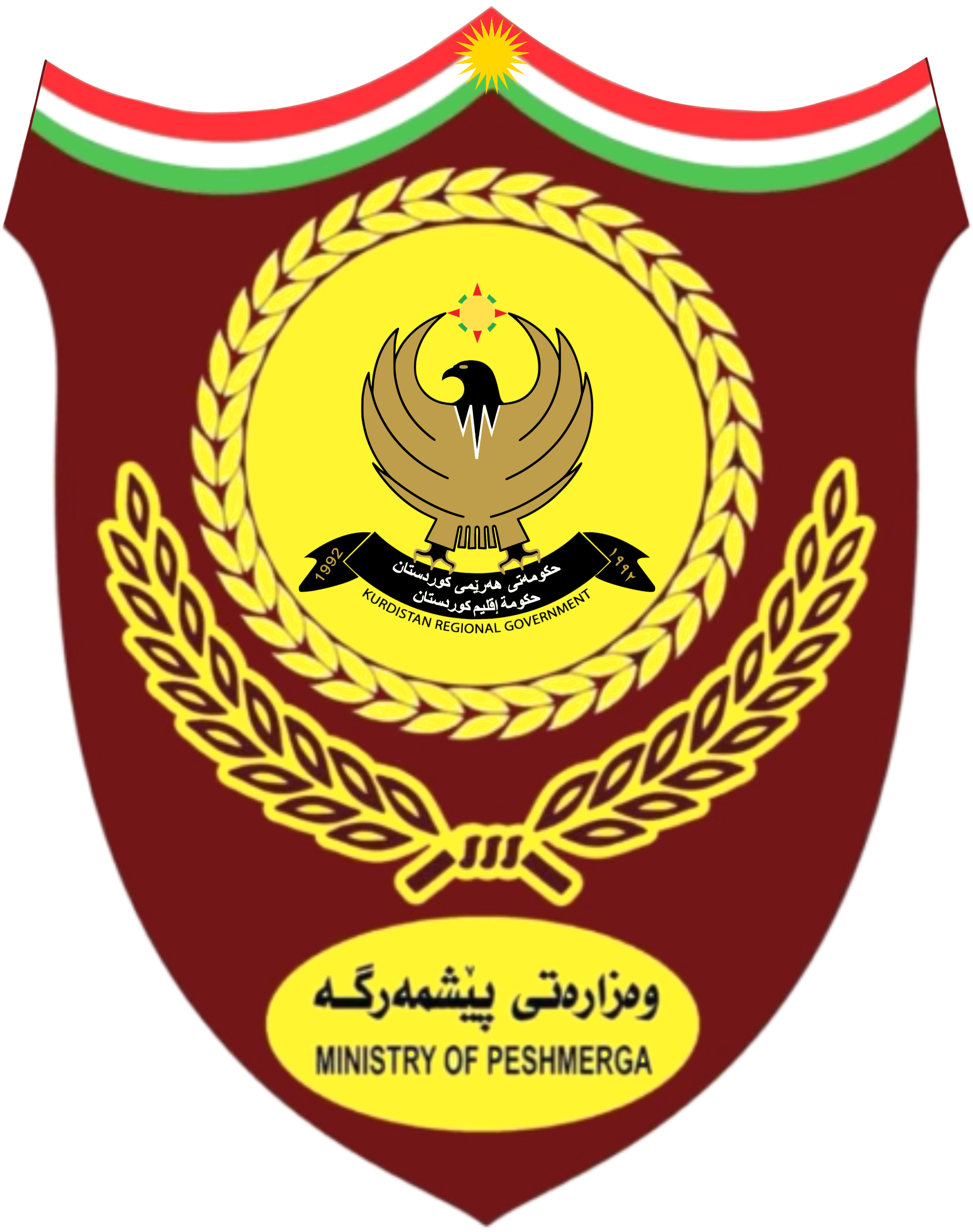
- Emblem of the Ministry of Peshmerga Affairs

Ministry overview
- Formed: 18 December 1991
- Jurisdiction: Kurdistan Region
- Headquarters: Erbil, Kurdistan Region
- Motto: "Biji Kurdistan" (non-official)
- Employees: 9000
- Ministry executives: Masrour Barzani, Chancellor; Shoresh Ismail Abdulla, Minister; Hoshmand Heyder, Deputy Minister; Jabbar Yawar, Secretary-General
- Child Ministry: Parastin u Zanyari
- Website: Official website

The Ministry of Peshmerga Affairs (MoPA) (Kurdish: وەزارەتی پێشمەرگە, romanized: Wezaretî Pêşmerge) is a ministry of the Kurdistan Regional Government (KRG) responsible for the organization and command of the Peshmerga, the armed forces of the Kurdistan Region of Iraq. It oversees defense policy, coordination with international partners, and the protection of citizens' security and freedoms.

== History ==
The Peshmerga have their roots in Kurdish armed movements of the 20th century, gradually evolving from partisan militias into a regional military force. Following the establishment of the Kurdistan Region in the 1990s, efforts were made to centralize the command structure, leading to the eventual formation of the Ministry of Peshmerga Affairs as part of the KRG institutions.

== Structure ==
The ministry commands several so-called Regional Guard Brigades (RGBs) and administrative units, though parts of the Peshmerga remain aligned with the region’s main political parties (KDP and PUK). It plays a central role in unifying and professionalizing the force within the wider framework of Kurdistan’s security institutions.

With 28 unified RGBs, the Ministry commands 74,400 Peshmerga soldiers, of whom 34,900 are based in the Erbil Governorate, 23,800 in the Duhok Governorate, and 15,700 in the Sulaymaniyah Governorate.

The 1st Support Forces and the 2nd Support Forces, who have been integrated into the MoPA in 2021 and 2022, provide the ministry's RGBs with critical support functions.

== Reform efforts ==
Since the war against the Islamic State (ISIS), reform has been a priority for the ministry. In January 2024, the ministry discussed steps toward restructuring and modernizing the Peshmerga with representatives of the United States and other members of the US-led coalition. In December 2023, the inaugural meeting of the Peshmerga Executive Steering Committee, a joint initiative with the coalition, was held to coordinate reform and integration measures.

== Leadership ==
The ministry is headed by the Minister of Peshmerga Affairs, appointed by the KRG cabinet. Since 2019, the position has been held by Shoresh Ismail Abdulla, a veteran Peshmerga commander and member of the KRG’s ninth cabinet.

== See also ==
- 1st Support Forces Command
- 2nd Support Forces Command
- Peshmerga Roj
- Ministry of Interior (Kurdistan Region)
