= Shoresh Ismail Abdulla =

Minister of Peshmerga Affairs

- شۆڕش ئیسماعیل عەبدوڵڵا
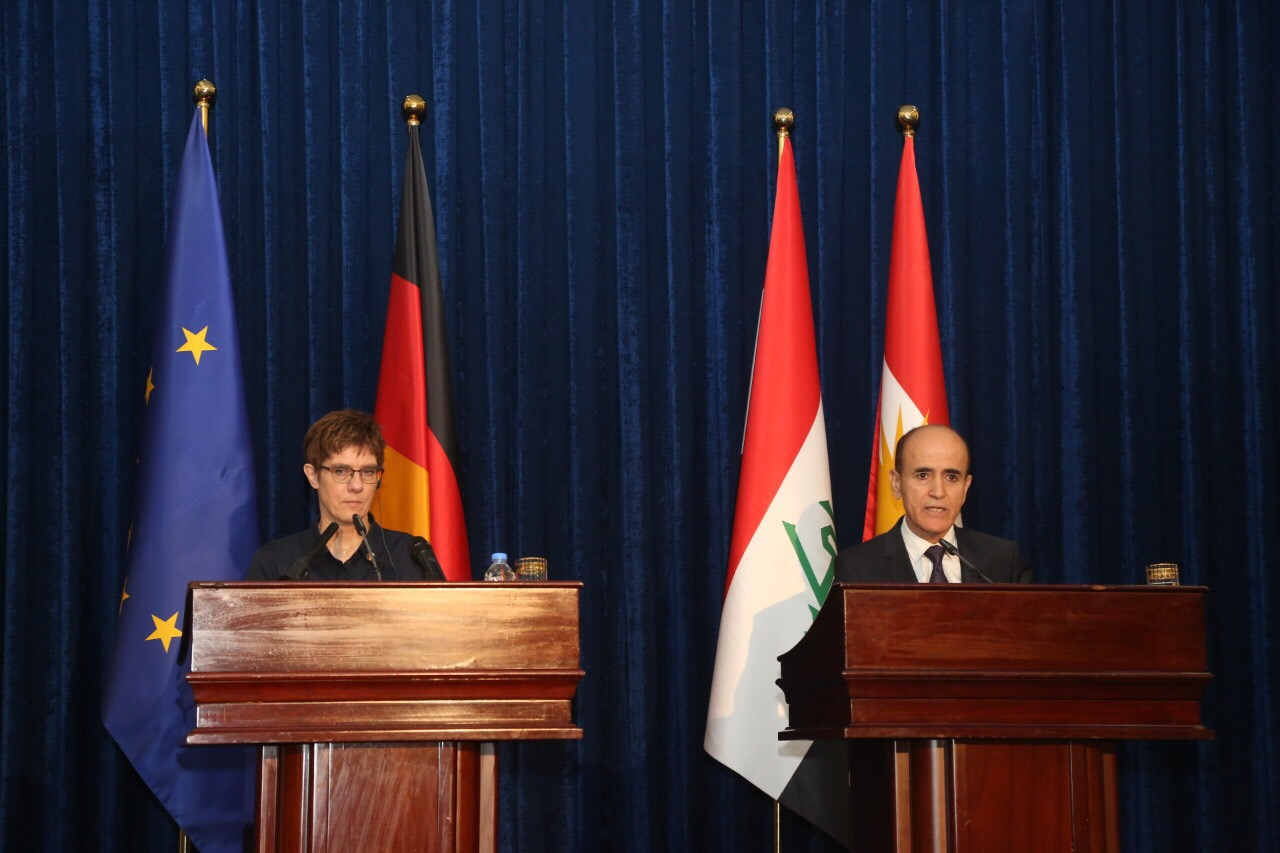
- Annegret Kramp and Shoresh Ismail

Minister of Peshmerga Affairs
- Incumbent
- Assumed office 10 July 2019
- Prime Minister: Masrour Barzani
- Parliamentary group: Patriotic Union of Kurdistan (PUK)

Head of PUK headquarters, Sulaymaniyah
- In office 1993–1994
- Parliamentary group: Patriotic Union of Kurdistan (PUK)

Head of PUK headquarters, Shahrizor
- In office 1994–1997
- Parliamentary group: Patriotic Union of Kurdistan (PUK)

Shoresh Ismail Abdulla (Kurdish: شۆڕش ئیسماعیل عەبدوڵڵا) born in 1956 is a Kurdish politician who has been the Minister of Peshmerga Affairs in the Kurdistan Regional Government since July 10, 2019, on behalf of the Patriotic Union of Kurdistan (PUK). Shorsh has a bachelor's degree in law.

Abdulla was the head of the PUK headquarters in Sulaymaniyah (1993–94) and Shahrizor (1994–97). He was then head of the Gali Kurdistan Martyr's Organization in Sulaymaniyah (2002–05) and deputy head of the Kurdistan Patriotic Union Party's Organization (2005–08). Since 2008, he has been head of the electoral Kurdistan Patriotic Union Party's office.
