= Armoured warfare of the Islamic State =

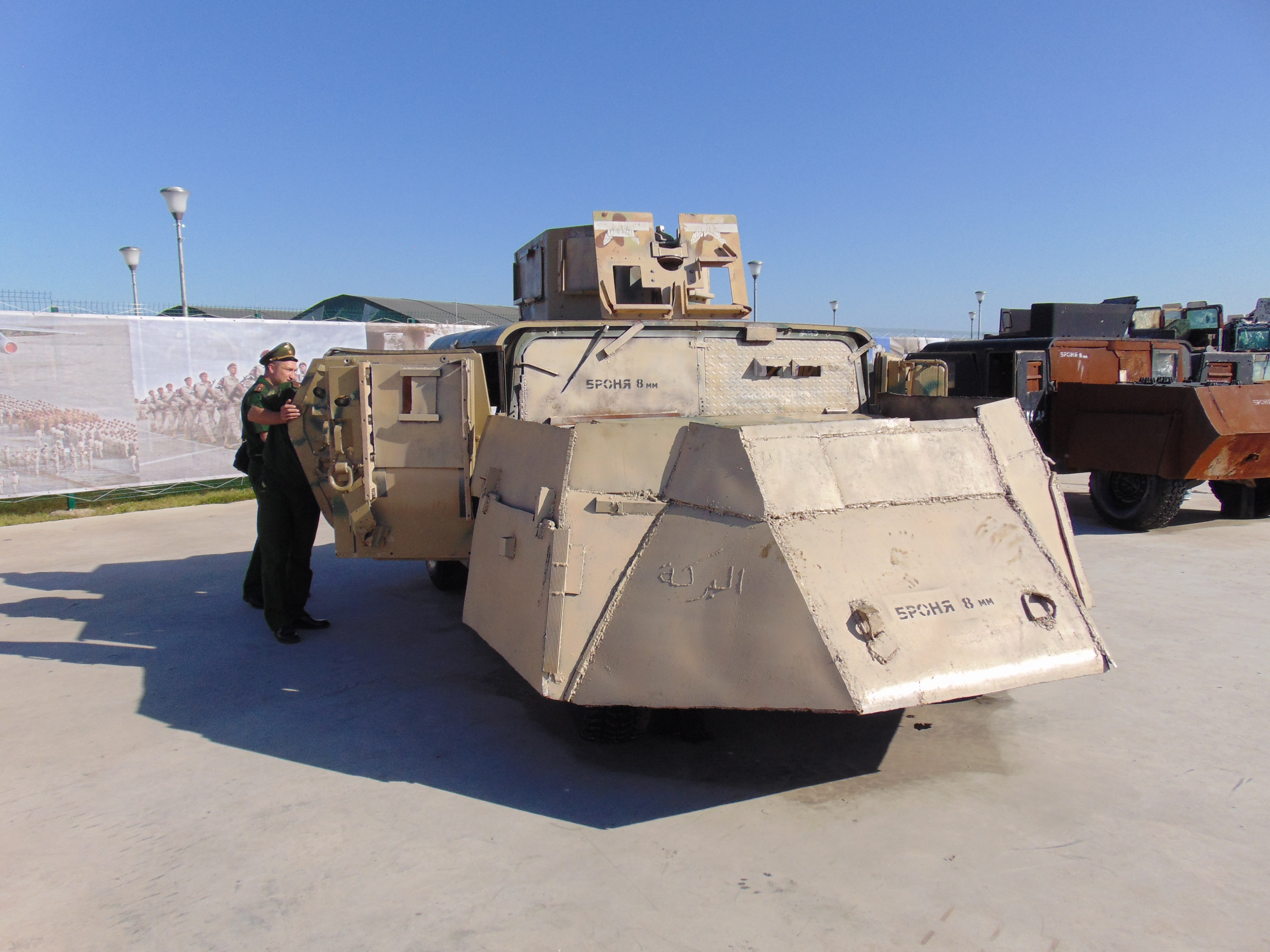
Homemade IS armored cars at an exhibition of trophies in Patriot Park (2018)

The Islamic State (IS) is known to extensively use armoured fighting vehicles (AFV) in both conventional and unconventional armoured warfare. From 2013/14, the military of IS captured hundreds of AFVs, including main battle tanks and armoured personnel carriers, and pressed them into service in Syria and Iraq. Besides using them conventionally, IS also converted many AFVs into vehicle-borne improvised explosive devices (VBIEDs) which were used to great effect in suicide attacks, as well as armouring regular vehicles for similar attacks. By 2017, most of the Islamic State's armour in the Middle East had been destroyed by the various anti-IS forces; however, African affiliates of IS are known to continue to operate AFVs.

== History ==
Although IS originated as an insurgent movement, its historical core membership included a significant number of ex-members of Ba'athist Iraq's military. Many of these veterans eventually became high-ranking commanders within IS. In consequence, the group had not just experience in insurgent but also regular warfare even before it emerged as actual proto-state. After the Syrian Civil War's outbreak in 2011, IS began to gradually grow in power and seized large swaths of Syrian and Iraqi territory during major offensives in 2014. It also captured great quantities of weaponry, including hundreds of AFVs. IS captured around 200 tanks and 70 BMP-1 infantry fighting vehicles in Syria alone. To defend its new holdings, IS reorganized its armed forces into a hybrid insurgent-conventional army, including units specifically designed to field AFVs. Several self-proclaimed provinces of IS set up workshops to support AFVs, although only a few actually created an industry surrounding these vehicles.

The Islamic State extensively used its armour in several battles. The organization deployed tanks during the Battle of Kirkuk (2014), where they failed to defeat Iraqi Kurdish Peshmerga, but were able to stall counter-attacks as the Peshmerga lacked sufficient anti-tank weapons. The Islamic State's armoured forces played an important role in the Siege of Kobani (2014–2015) when it deployed between 30 and 50 T-55s and T-72s in an attempt to crush the YPG/YPJ defenders. In the initial advance on Kobani, the IS tanks were tactically well used for breakthrough operations. However, the IS armoured forces lost many vehicles amid the urban combat and as a result of airstrikes by the United States Air Force in the siege's later stages. In the process, the tanks gradually lost their importance for the group as they became easy targets for the increasingly active anti-IS coalition. This change was displayed in the Battle of Ramadi (2015–2016), when IS mainly used armoured vehicles to clear obstacles or as suicide tank bombs.

In August 2015, the Islamic State's "Platoons of Special Tasks" deployed several tanks and armoured personnel carriers (APCs) during two mechanized assaults aimed at capturing the besieged Kuweires Military Aviation Institute. Both attacks failed to breach Kuweires' extensive fortifications, resulting in heavy losses among IS troops. Tanks were also heavily involved in battling the Syrian Democratic Forces, with IS relying on sophisticated camouflage to avoid being targeted by the anti-IS coalition's air forces. As time went on, however, several defeats on the ground and the constant aerial bombardments gradually whittled down the Islamic State's armoured forces. One of the last operations which saw the mass use of IS AFVs was the Palmyra offensive (December 2016). By 2017, most of its AFVs were destroyed and its ability to maintain conventional armed units greatly degraded. In late 2017, IS moved a large number of its remaining tanks and APCs from Iraq to Syria in an attempt to turn the tide during the Battle of Deir ez-Zor (September–November 2017). Since the Battle of Baghuz Fawqani in early 2019, IS no longer controls significant territorial holdings in the Middle East aside from some desert enclaves, and has returned to waging an insurgency in Syria and Iraq.

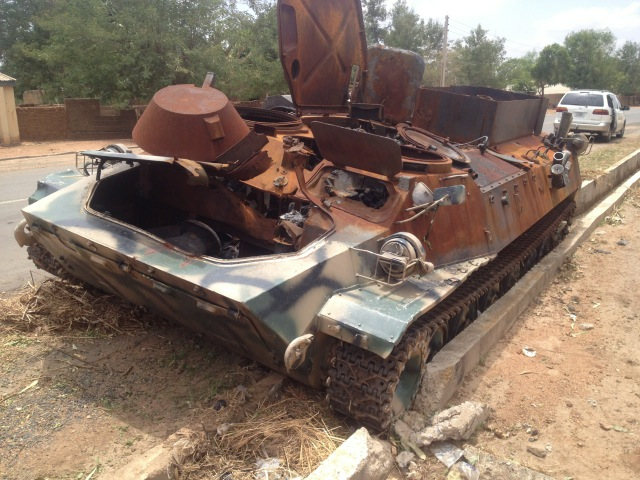
MT-LB which had been captured and used by the Islamic State – West Africa Province before its destruction in March 2015.

IS still holds territories outside the Middle East, however, and some of its forces still maintain small numbers of AFVs. Most notably, Islamic State's West Africa Province (ISWAP) captured and then deployed several tanks during the Chad Basin campaign (2018–2020). ISWAP even mounted speakers onto their tanks, blasting jihadist battle songs when using them in combat.

== Organization ==
Several units of the Islamic State's military are known to use armoured fighting vehicles; five of these are known in Syria: The Tank Battalion (Arabic: كتيبة الدبابات), the Platoons of Special Tasks (often called the "Caliphate Army"), the Uthman ibn Affan Division (فرقة عثمان بن عفان), the Abu Ubaidah ibn al-Jarrah Division (فرقة أبي عبيدة بن الجراح), and the Zubayr ibn al-Awwam Division (فرقة الزبير بن العوام). The latter three are named after companions of Muhammad. Main battle tanks are mainly employed as part of the Tank Battalion, while the other four formations are known to employ less heavy AFVs (though exceptions exist). The AFVs most commonly deployed by the Tank Battalion were T-55, T-62, and T-72 tanks, of which over a hundred were in use in Syria and Iraq. The Islamic State possessed at least two to four T-62s, and fielded about 19 T-72s by 2017. The "Platoons of Special Tasks" instead relied more on BMP infantry fighting vehicles and technicals. However, IS often used these units in tandem for operations, for example outfitting the "Platoons of Special Tasks" with tanks and artillery if the situation demanded it. Tank crews were also attached to non-armoured units during offensive operations, such as in the Palmyra offensive (May 2015), as IS hoped to capture tanks and directly press them into service. In general, teams of observers were attached to IS tank and artillery units and helped them to select targets.

The Islamic State's AFVs were supported by a large and complex logistical network. The armour was moved around in a fleet of low loaders and disguised in various ways to survive the regular aerial bombardments of the anti-IS coation. In addition, many small industrial sites and scavenging teams were set up that harvested abandoned allied or enemy vehicles, repaired damaged vehicles, produced spare parts as well as ammunition, and modified. Two main facilities existed in Syria at which IS repaired, built and modified its AFVs. Known as "The Workshops", one was located in Deir ez-Zor and the other south of al-Thawrah. The latter was more prominent and modified about 400 vehicles before being captured by the Syrian Army during the 2017 Southern Raqqa offensive.

IS armour also included armored cars such as Humvees of which the Islamic State captured about 2,300 from the Iraqi military in 2014. In addition, IS fielded armoured vehicle-borne improvised explosive device (VBIEDs). Although most VBIEDs are modified cars, some are cars outfitted with armour or outright AFVs. These armoured bombs cannot be destroyed by small arms or machine gun fire, making them more fitting for attacks on well-armed opponents, while AFV suicide bomb can hold more explosives in a tighter shell which results in an even greater destructive potential than those of regular car bombs.

== Tactics ==
The Islamic State's AFVs usually do not operate on their own, and are instead employed as part of mobile ad hoc combined arms reaction forces. In Syria and Iraq, these included tanks, technicals, and artillery which were stationed at hidden positions, often in vicinity of the frontline. If enemy forces broke through in some area or an offensive was launched by IS, the small reaction forces would launch an attack in two waves, with VBIEDs acting as spearheads which destroy hostile strongholds or cause confusion, followed by the AFVs and technicals. These assaults were often very successful, resulting in the rout of anti-IS forces. In the Siege of Kobani, IS tanks were sophistically deployed to soften up targets for infantry assaults; in this regard, one United States special operations forces officer stated that the Islamic State used its tanks "the way that the [United States] and the Russians would doctrinally use armor".

The Islamic State's use of tanks in Syria and Iraq became severely hampered as its enemies waged an increasingly effective air campaign. Researcher Ido Levy argued that after the Siege of Kobani, "reliance on concentrated firepower became a liability because of the ease with which coalition airpower could target slow-moving heavy weapons and SVBIEDs". Thus, tanks became less and less important to overall IS operations.

=== Camouflage and decoys ===
To protect its armour from airstrikes, IS makes extensive use of camouflage and decoys. "The Workshops" would commonly add multi-spectral camouflage to tanks. In addition, some tanks were outfitted with camouflage consisting of leather strips and camouflage nets which made the vehicles harder to spot from the ground and the air. At least one tank was even outfitted with a superstructure which made it look like a truck from above. IS troops also built wooden dummy tanks during the Battle of Mosul (2016–17) to divert airstrikes.

== Crews ==
Posing with their tanks, photographing them from different angles and even becoming members of tank enthusiast groups on Facebook, their presence on social media certainly provides for an interesting insight into the life of Islamic State fighters one doesn't get to see often.

— Researcher Stijn Mitzer

The troops which are given access to heavy weapons such as tanks are usually those regarded by IS as being the most loyal and capable ones. IS tank crews and technicians are known to have formed tight-knit groups within the Islamic State's military, often socialising with each other even when not on duty. Researcher Stijn Mitzer noted that many IS tank crews and technicians had a strong presence on social media where they actually communicated with tank crews from opposing armies such as the Syrian Army, bonding over their shared passion for AFVs despite being enemies. Many IS tank drivers were also part of Facebook tank enthusiast groups, sharing photos taken with their tanks with others, including non-Sunni Muslims. Over time, most IS tank crews in Syria and Iraq were killed in action.

== Propaganda ==
Syrian and Iraqi tank crews were also often featured in IS propaganda. In at least one instance in October 2015, IS used a tank to execute a Syrian Army prisoner by running him over, claiming that the prisoner had been a tank driver who had crushed IS fighters in one battle. The video material of the execution was subsequently included in IS propaganda.

== See also ==
- Military history of Iraq
- Military history of Syria
- History of the tank
