= Gun trick =

Gun trick may refer to:

- Bullet catch, a conjuring illusion in which a bullet appears to be caught safely by a magician at whom the bullet was fired
- Quaker Gun trick, a simulated cannon made from a wooden log, sometimes painted black, used to deceive an enemy into believing a foe possesses excess guns
