= Dummy tank =

Decoy military tank

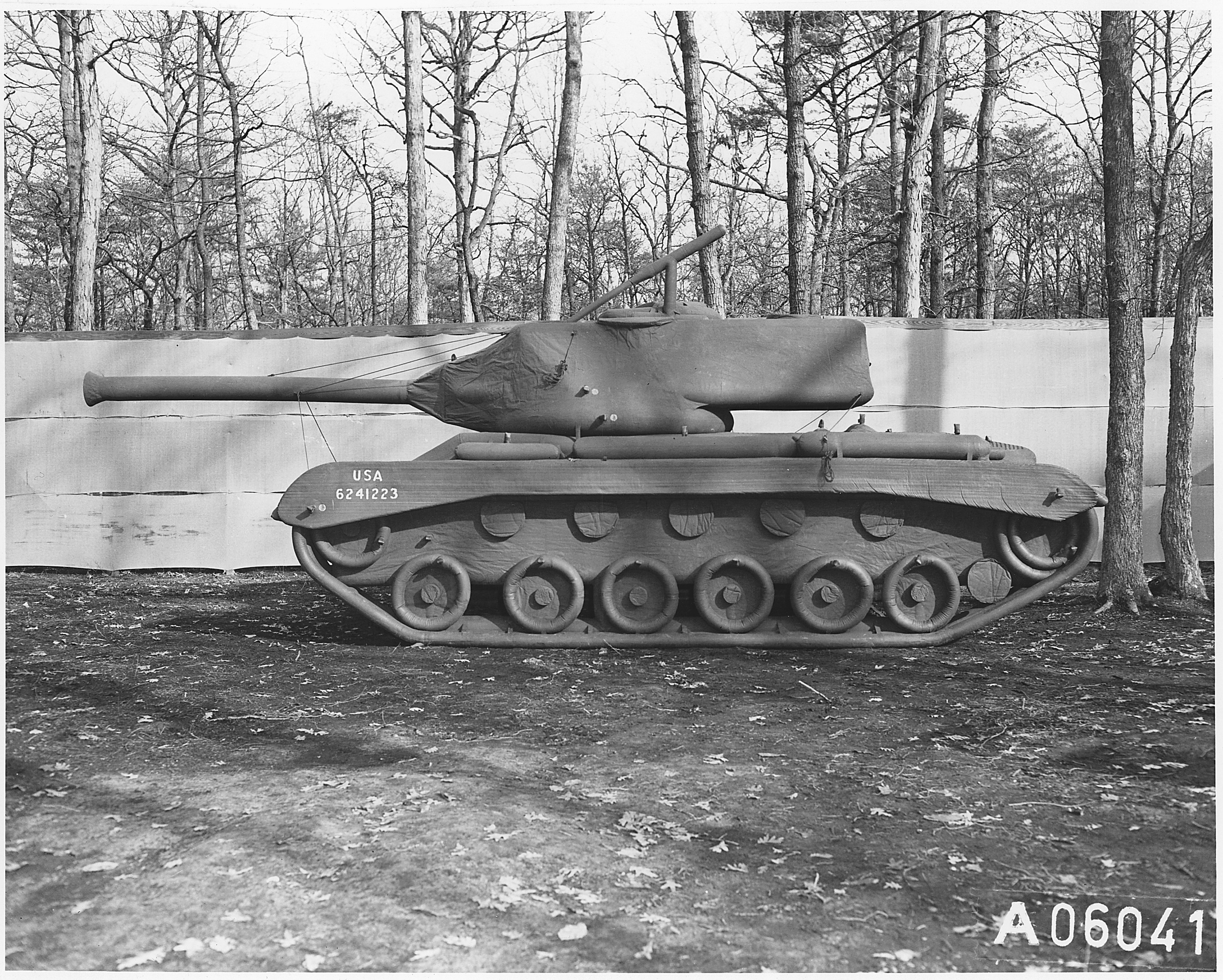
Inflatable M47 Patton mock-up

Dummy tanks superficially resemble real tanks and are often deployed as a means of military deception in the absence of real tanks. Early designs included wooden shells and inflatable props that could fool enemy intelligence; they were fragile and only believable from a distance. Modern designs are more advanced and can imitate heat signatures, making them more effective illusions.

== World War I ==
During World War I, Allied forces made use of dummy versions of the British heavy tanks. These were constructed from a wooden framework and covered with painted Hessian cloth. The tracks, too, were non-functional, so some were fitted with wheels underneath and were towed from place to place by a pair of horses. Dummy tanks, representing Allied models, were also found to have been constructed by the Germans, even though they deployed only a small number of real tanks. It is possible they were used in training, rather than for military deception.

== World War II ==
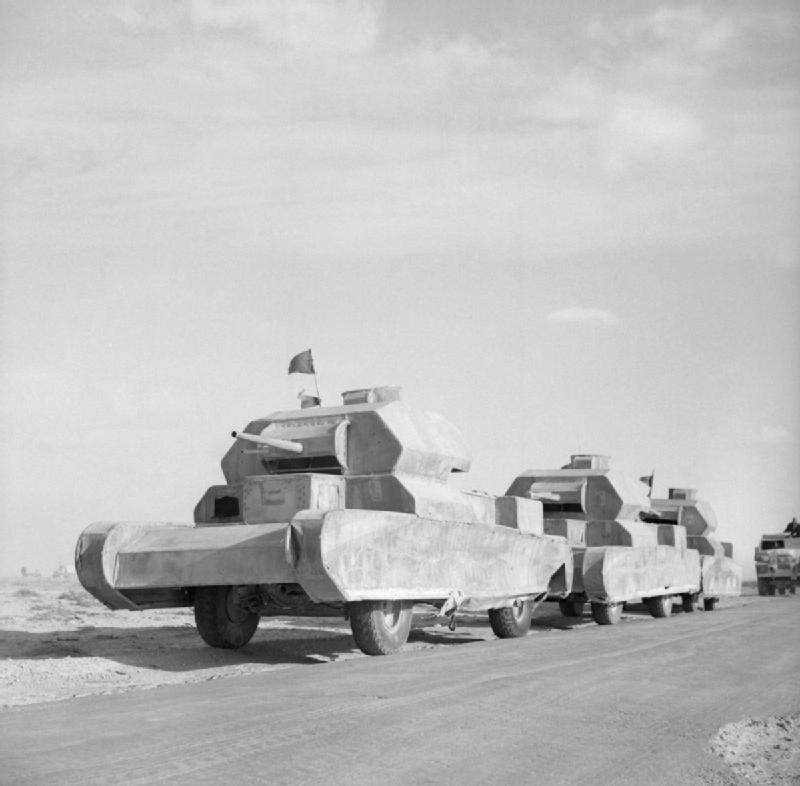
Dummy tanks, mounted on trucks, going to the forward areas in the Western Desert, 13 February 1942

Dummy tanks saw significantly more use during World War II by both the Allies and the Axis. German forces utilized mock tanks prior to the start of the war for practice and training exercises. Their use in military deception was pioneered by British forces, who termed them "spoofs".

One of the first uses of dummy tanks during the Second World War was in the North African Campaign. The Royal Engineers stationed there constructed two per day; between April and June 1941, they were able to build three dummy Royal Tank Regiments, and another in November that same year. These were foldable, and thus portable; and the Royal Engineers improved them further. Jeeps were used to make the "spoofs" more mobile: a steel frame covered with canvas was placed on them, making a self-propelled dummy tank. The Jeep did not realistically simulate the noise or movement of a tank, but allowed the dummy to be deployed quickly. Meanwhile, the reverse was also done, to make tanks look like trucks. A further device was put into use that both created simulated tank tracks and erased real ones.

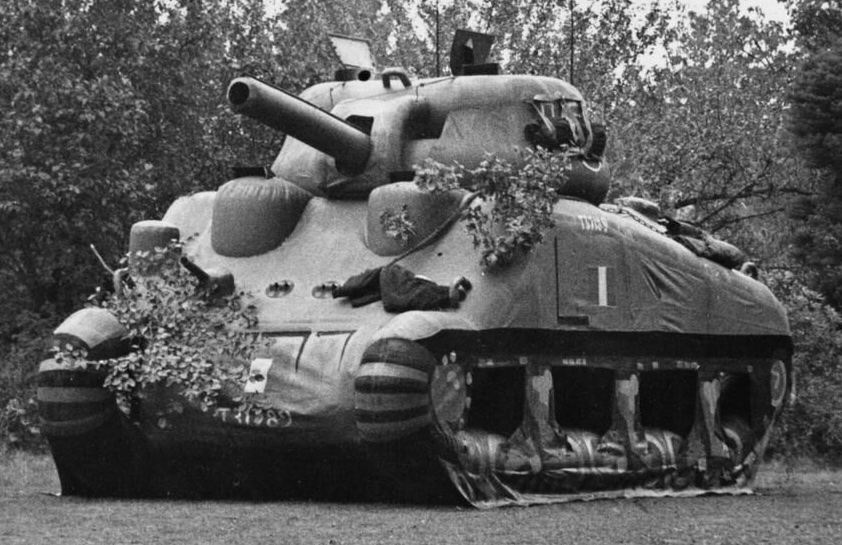
An inflatable dummy tank, modeled after the M4 Sherman

Inflatable dummies consisted of a fabric covering supported by a network of pressurized rubber tubes that formed a kind of "pneumatic skeleton". These were generally preferred in the field, despite their tendency to rapidly deflate if punctured by accident or shellfire. In one operation in September 1944, the British deployed 148 inflatable tanks close to the front line and around half were "destroyed" by fragments from German mortar and artillery fire, and by Allied bombs falling short.

Contrary to common wisdom there is actually no evidence that inflatable dummy tanks were used during Operation Fortitude, the massive deception plan enacted prior to the landings at the Normandy Beaches, while there was a limited use of other dummy vehicles, mostly made of wood, sheet metal and canvas. However, dummy vehicles played only a small part of the overall deception plan as, at that stage of the war, the Germans were unable to fly reconnaissance planes over England and such effort would have been wasted. Fortitude deception was largely double agents and false radio traffic.

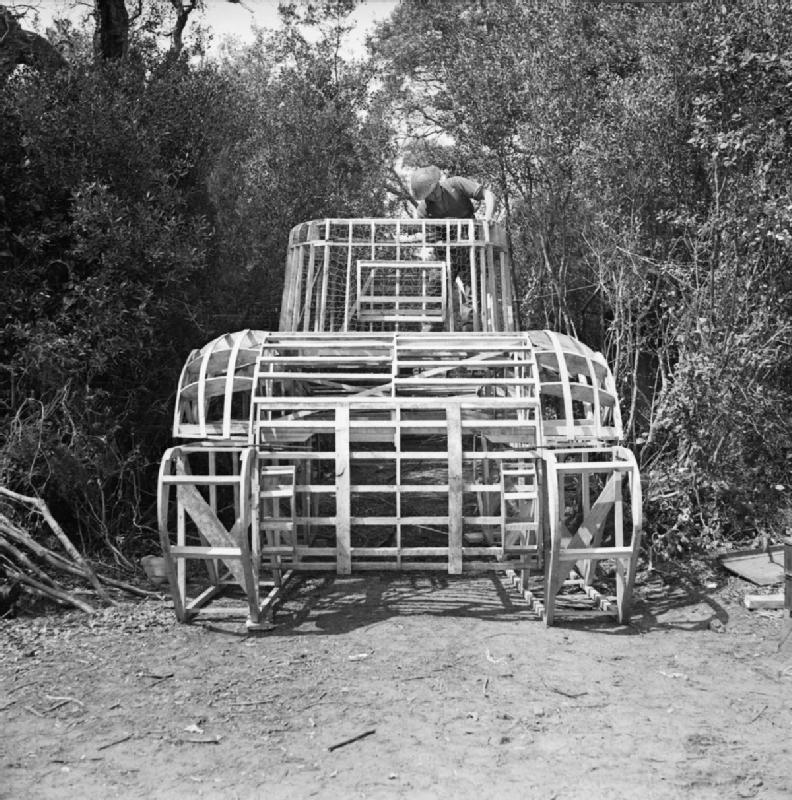
A dummy Sherman tank under construction by 6 Field Park Company, Royal Engineers, in the Anzio bridgehead, 29 April 1944.

During Operation Shingle at Anzio, Italy, inflatable Sherman tanks were deployed when the real tanks were elsewhere. In the Pacific Theater of Operations, the Japanese also utilized decoys; one recorded instance was during the Battle of Iwo Jima. A "tank" was surrounded by American infantry, which had been under artillery bombardment: they found it was not real, but merely a sculpture carved out of volcanic ash.

The Red Army employed dummy tanks to increase their apparent numbers and mask their true movements.

== Modern era ==
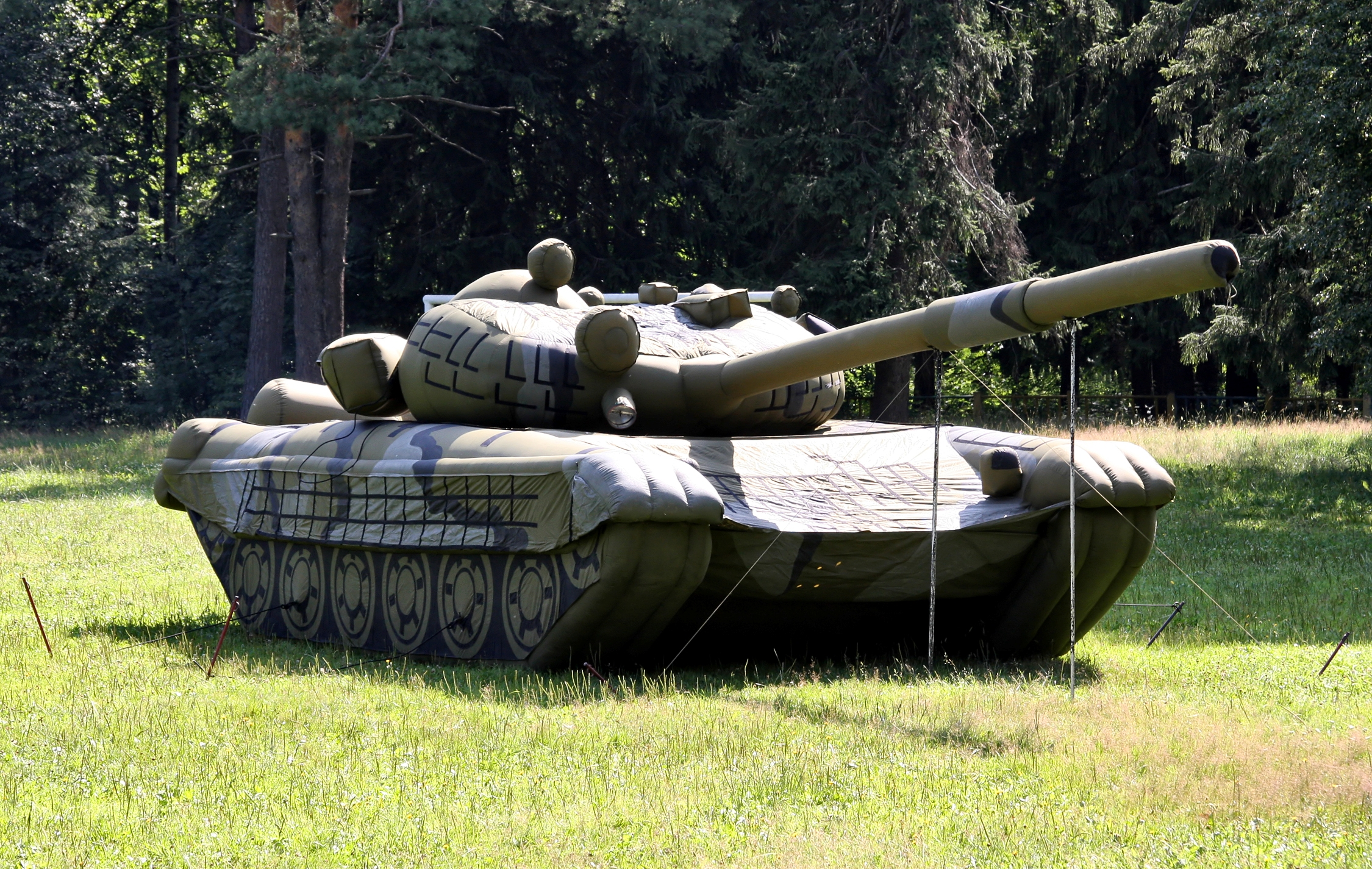
Inflatable mock-up of a T-72 tank

During the Kosovo War, the Serbian army regularly placed dummy tanks in Kosovo, which misled NATO forces into thinking that they were destroying far more tanks than they really were.

The United States Army has developed a modern dummy tank. It imitates the M1 Abrams tank not only in appearance, but also in its heat signature, in order to appear real to infrared detectors. One of these decoys can take fire from the enemy and still appear to be operational, thus delaying the enemy by as much as an hour, as they are forced to destroy the decoy. These M1 decoys cost only $3,300, compared to $4.35 million for a real M1. The decoy is also practical: when disassembled, it weighs only 50 pounds (23 kg), and is roughly the same size as a duffel bag. Its generator—about the size of a 12 inches (30 cm) television—facilitates inflation, so that two people can erect the decoy in a few minutes. Occasionally, real tanks carry a dummy on board, to deploy when needed.

During the Battle of Mosul (2016–2017), the Islamic State of Iraq and the Levant constructed and deployed wooden mockups of various vehicles in order to distract Coalition airstrikes.

The German army uses a small number of GRP dummy tanks exclusively for training purposes. In its original form, the Camouflage and Deception Technology Base is a relic of the Cold War. Specialists from the National People's Army (NVA - Nationale Volksarmee) of the former DDR built amazingly lifelike mock-ups of Warsaw Pact military technology and combat vehicles here. The purpose of it all: Whether tanks, radar systems or missile launchers - the dummies were visibly set up to deceive the enemy about their own strength or to provoke attacks as dummy targets and thus exhaust the enemy's resources. After reunification, the Bundeswehr took over the site and its capabilities. Since then, however, the troops have set different priorities. Instead of large full dummies, mock-ups of small combat equipment or tank turrets are usually produced for training purposes.

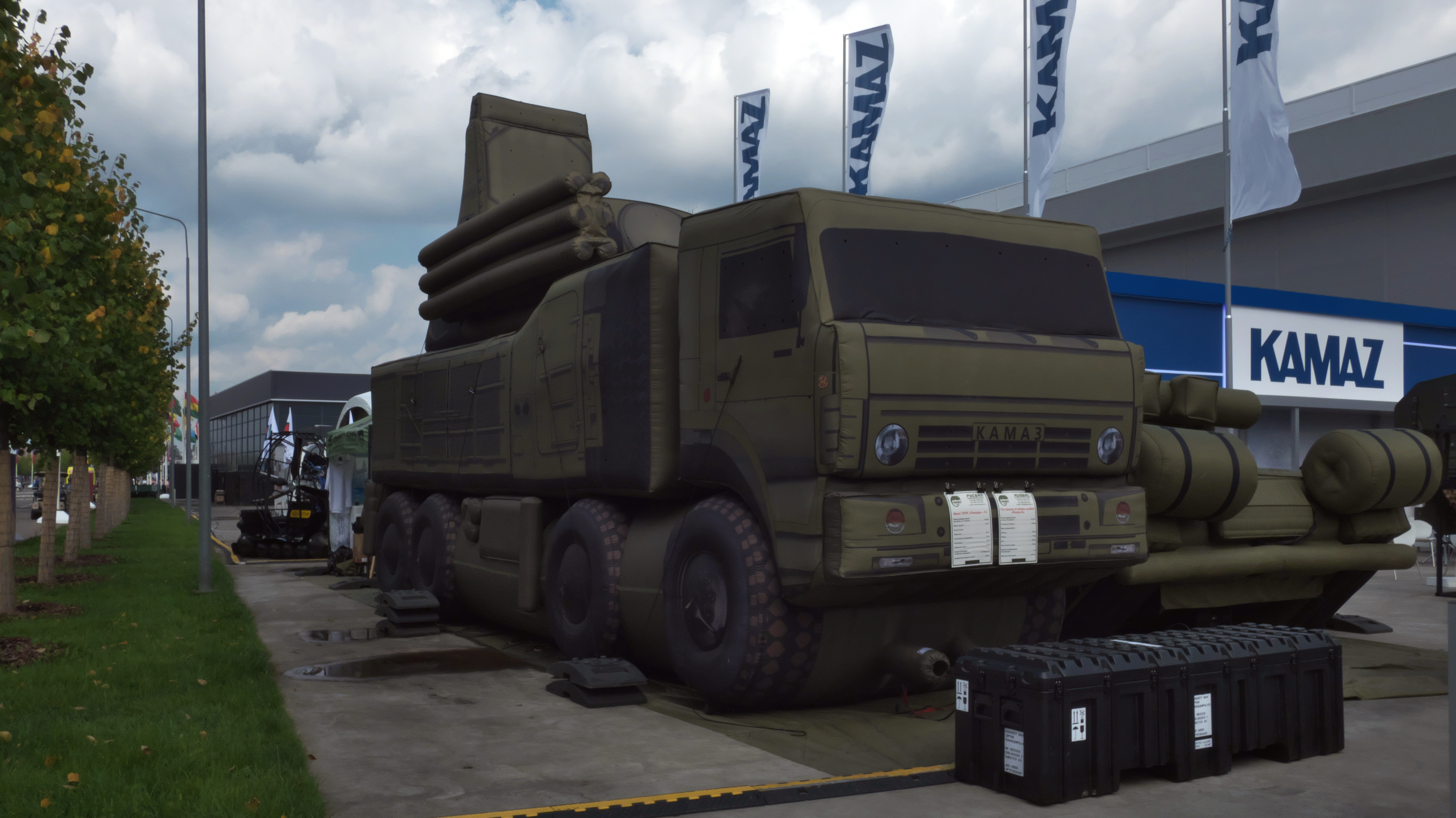
Dummy Pantsir-S1 anti-aircraft truck

Dummy tanks manufactured by the Czech company Inflatech are also being employed by the Armed Forces of Ukraine during the Russian invasion of Ukraine, in order to waste Russian resources by attracting missile and drone attacks.

== See also ==
- Military deception
- Military dummy
- Paradummy
- Quaker gun
