= Military dummy =

Fake military equipment intended to deceive the enemy

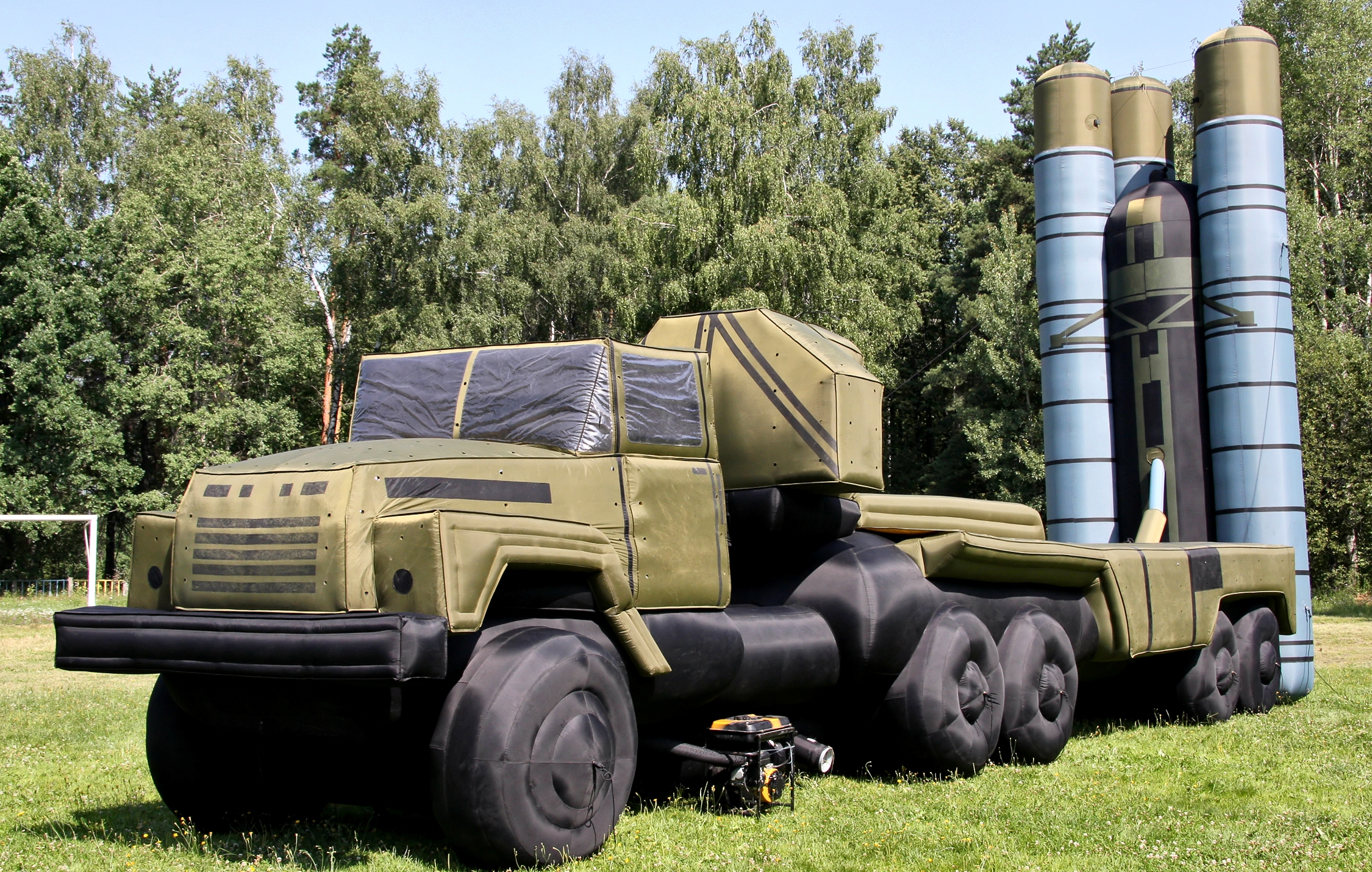
Inflatable S-300 missile system

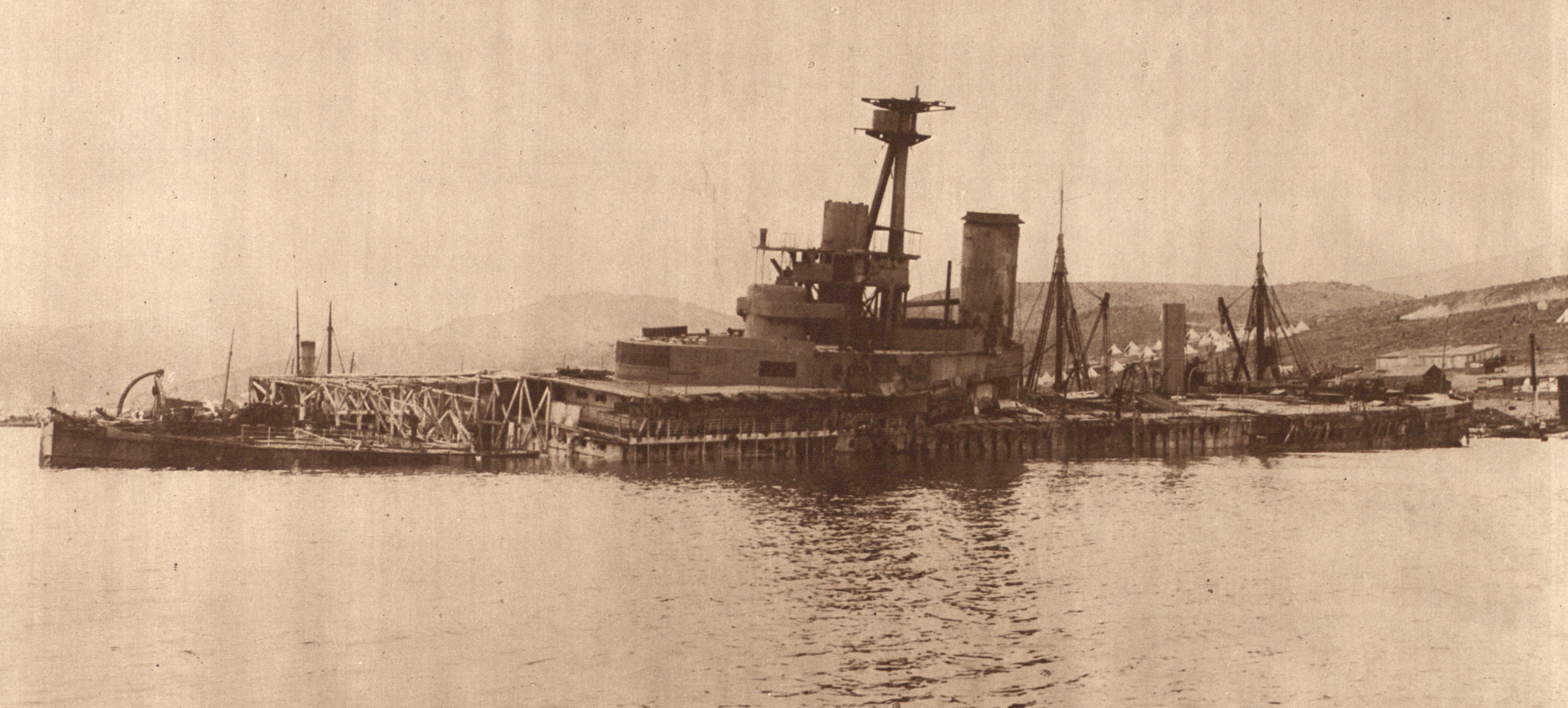
One of the British squadron of dummy wooden battleships used to deceived the German military during World War I

Dummies and decoys are fake military equipment that are intended to deceive the enemy. Dummies and decoys are only one aspect of military deception.

== Examples ==
During World War II, dummy airfields and even towns were used in England to divert German bombers from the real targets. At the Battle of La Ciotat in 1944, American aircraft dropped hundreds of dummy paratroopers (paradummies) just north of La Ciotat, France. The goal of this operation was to divert German troops away from the main landing zones of Operation Dragoon. Additionally, during World War II, Operation Quicksilver was an attempt to mislead the Germans as to the location of the D-Day invasion using dummy military equipment.

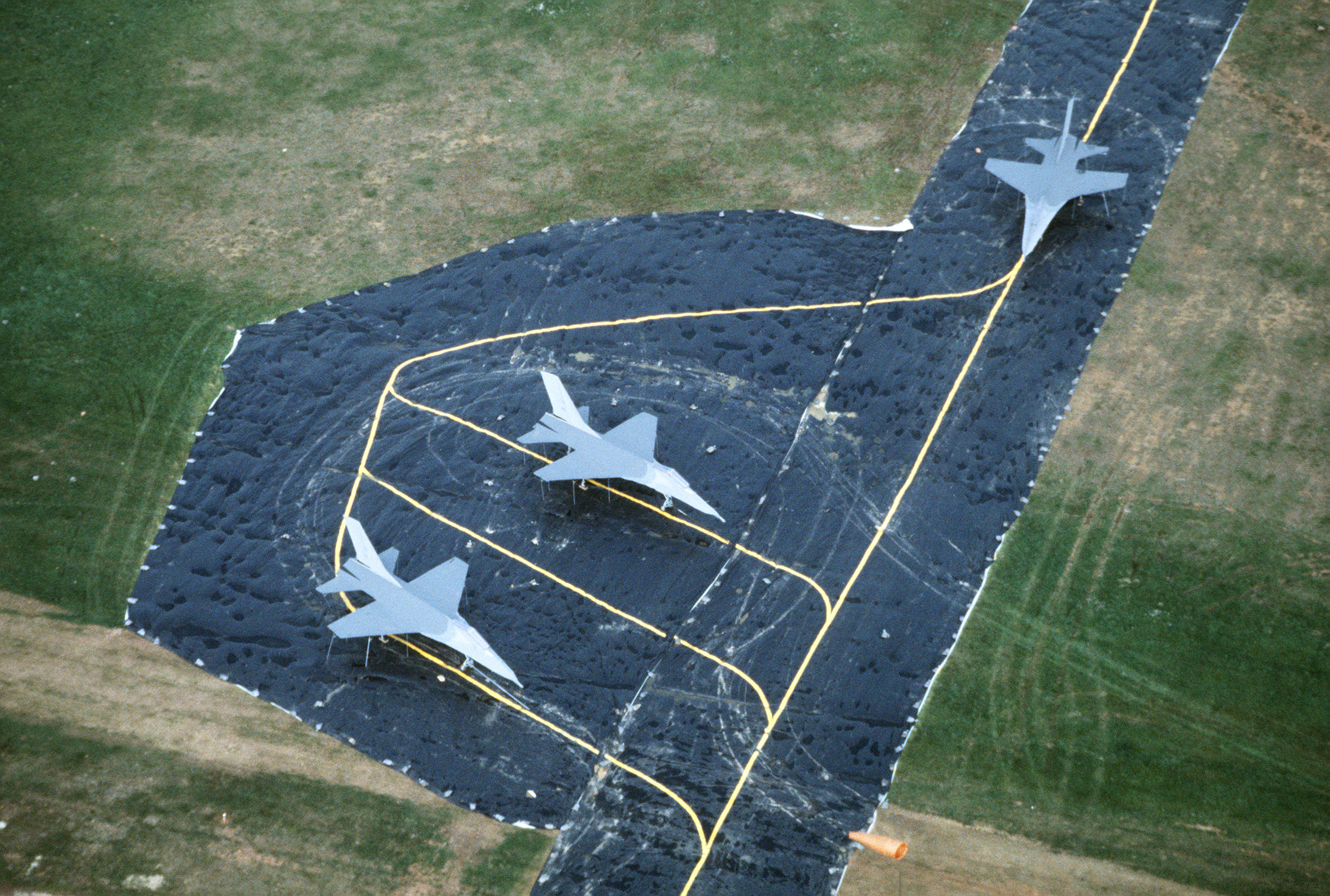
F-16 mockups on a fake taxiway at Spangdahlem Air Base, 1985

A naval example was the British battleship HMS Centurion. Obsolete and disarmed by World War II, she spent two years in the Mediterranean fitted with wooden guns, to make British naval forces in the area seem stronger than they were. Likewise, Fleet tender was the codename for a number of British merchant ships that fitted with dummy structures to resemble warships. During the late Cold War, East German S-200 surface-to-air missile sites employed decommissioned and modified PRV-9 height finding radars as decoys to confuse NATO electronic signals intelligence gathering operations.

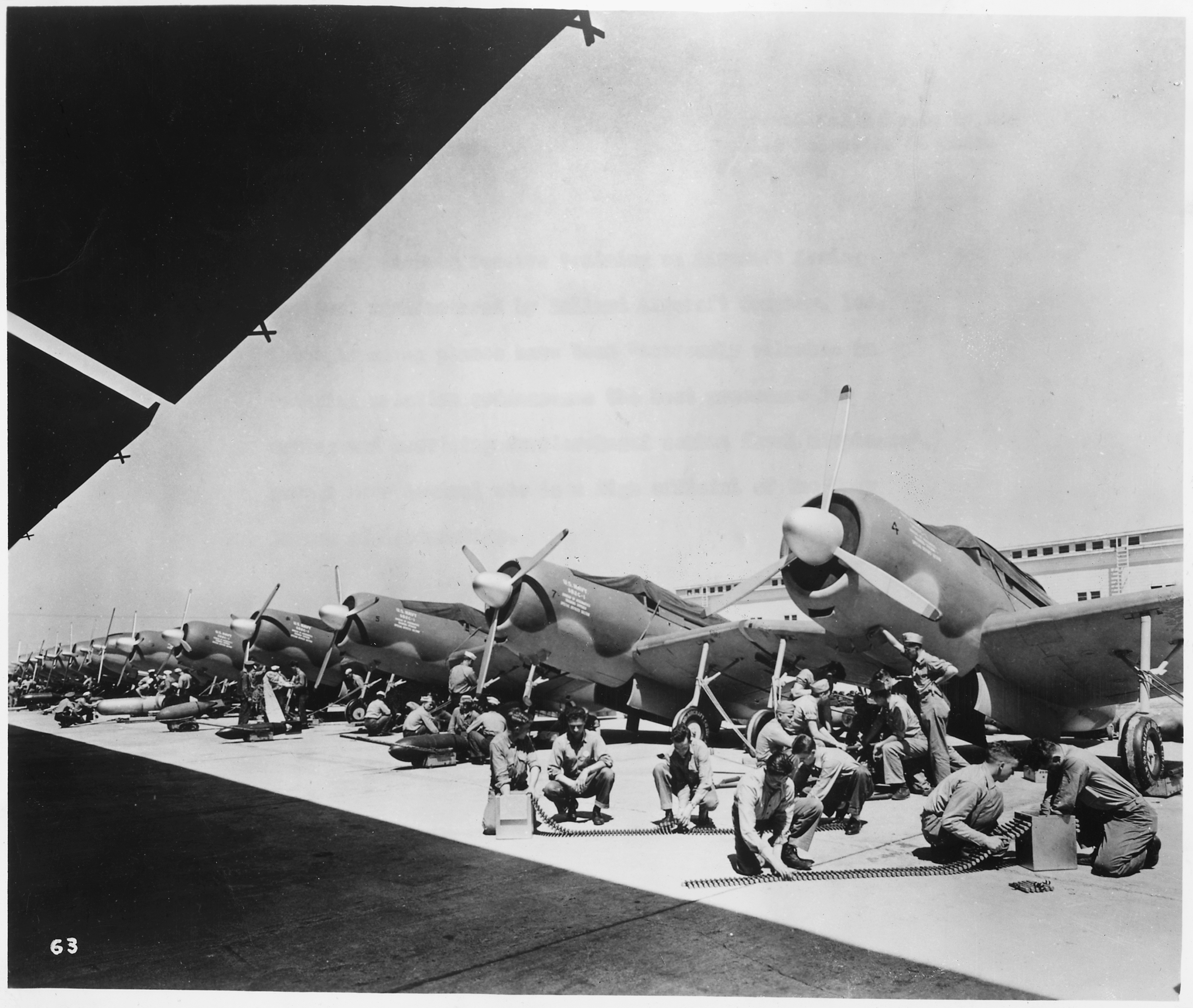
Dummy replica aircraft used by US Navy to train aircraft ordnance technicians during World War II

In the 1991 Persian Gulf War, BQM-74C Chukar III drones were used as decoys during the initial air attacks into Iraq. One group of drones flew over 500 kilometers (310 miles) at 630 km/h (390 mph), then began to circle Baghdad for up to 20 minutes. Iraqi air defense radars which probed for the drones were engaged by allied strike aircraft firing AGM-88 HARMs (High-speed Anti-Radiation Missiles).

During the Kosovo War, NATO claimed to have destroyed over 100 Serbian tanks and 200 armored personnel carriers using expensive precision-guided munitions, while various estimates place that number much lower. Numerous remains of decoys made of wood and canvas, or from out-of-commission vehicles are instead said to have been found by reporters.

In Russia, a former hot air balloon factory has continued in the 2010s to make dummy tanks, aircraft, missile launch pads, radar stations, and rocket launchers. The inflatable dummies are designed to present a realistic image to enemy radar and thermal imaging.

During the Russian invasion of Ukraine, AFU successfully used wooden dummies of HIMARS in order to divert Russian missile strikes.

An intercontinental ballistic missile may release decoys in addition to one or more warheads.

Military aircraft on SEAD missions may carry decoy missiles such as the ADM-160 MALD which can create aircraft-like return signals on enemy radars.

=== Russo-Ukrainian War ===
Ukraine has made widespread usage of decoys in the current Russo-Ukrainian War. In particular, the usage of fake M777 howitzers costing $1000, whereas the actual weapon costs "several million dollars" to make. Such decoys are primarily constructed of steel and wood. This is done in order to match the infra-red signature that a real M777 would give off. It also gives a false impression of the strength and composition of deployed Ukrainian weaponry to enemy observers. This is in line with fake HIMARS launchers that have been used by Ukraine since August 2022. Russia has also used fake trenches filled with explosives to kill Ukrainian soldiers.

In April 2024, the UK's Ministry of Defence (MoD) reported that Russian occupied Kirovske air base had Su-30 fighter decoys painted on its hardstands and that at least a dozen more Russian air bases had painted similar decoys. The MoD believed the decoys were a reaction to Ukrainian attacks following the Russian invasion of Ukraine.

== See also ==
- Dummy round
- Dummy tank
- Ghost Army
- Military deception
- Paradummy
- Maskirovka
- Q-ship
- Quaker gun
- Rubber duck
- Sonar decoy
- Victor Jones
