= Paradummy =

Military deception device

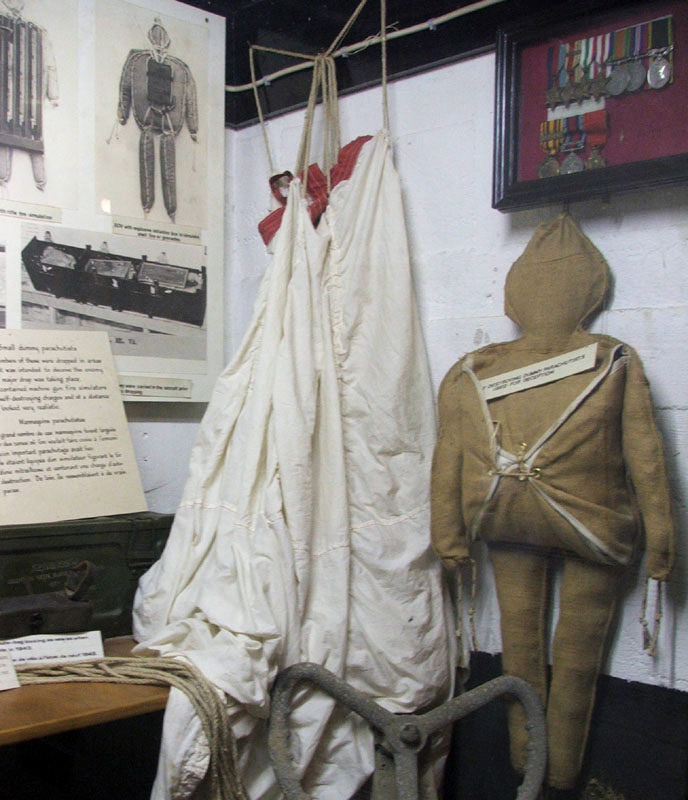
British "Rupert" at Merville Gun Battery Museum in France

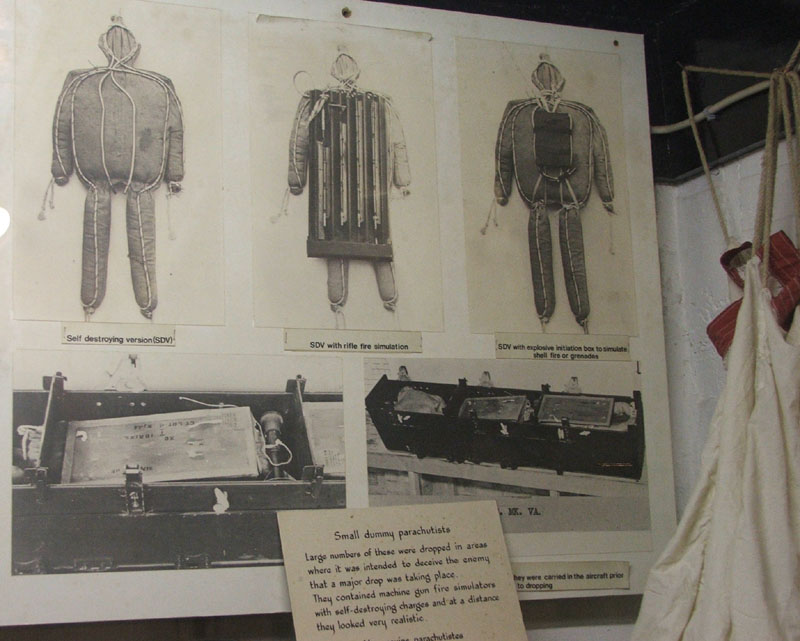
British "Rupert" at Merville Bunker D-Day Museum in France

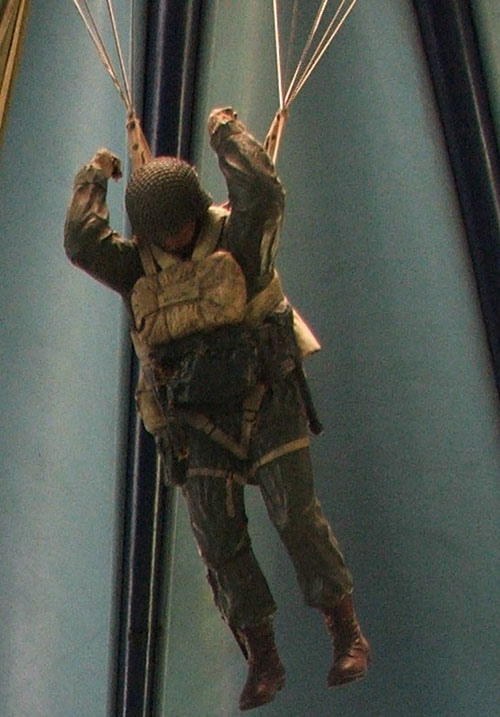
Film prop from the 1962 war film The Longest Day at Airborne Museum of Sainte-Mère-Église in France

A paradummy is a military deception device first used in World War II, intended to imitate a drop of paratroop attackers. This can cause the enemy to shift forces or fires unnecessarily, or even lure enemy troops into staged ambushes.

The dolls used for Operation Titanic, deception activities to conceal the location of the D-Day landings, were nicknamed Rupert by British troops and Oscar by American troops. The official name was "Device Camouflage No. 15". They were made of burlap and filled with straw or green waste. The dolls were immobile and about 85 cm tall, consequently smaller than a person, but on the ground during twilight it was difficult to discern the difference between them and real parachutists. The dummies contained explosives which detonated on impact with the ground, in order to confuse nearby defenders. In addition, real parachutists would hang motionless from their parachutes during the jump, so the ground troops could not discern them from real jumpers or comrades who had been shot while airborne.

Some were found in a warehouse on an old British airfield in the 1980s. Some of the original dolls from this find are now exhibited in war museums.

== See also ==
- Dummy tank
- Military deception
- Military dummy
- Quaker gun
