= Cherry gun =

Wooden artillery weapon

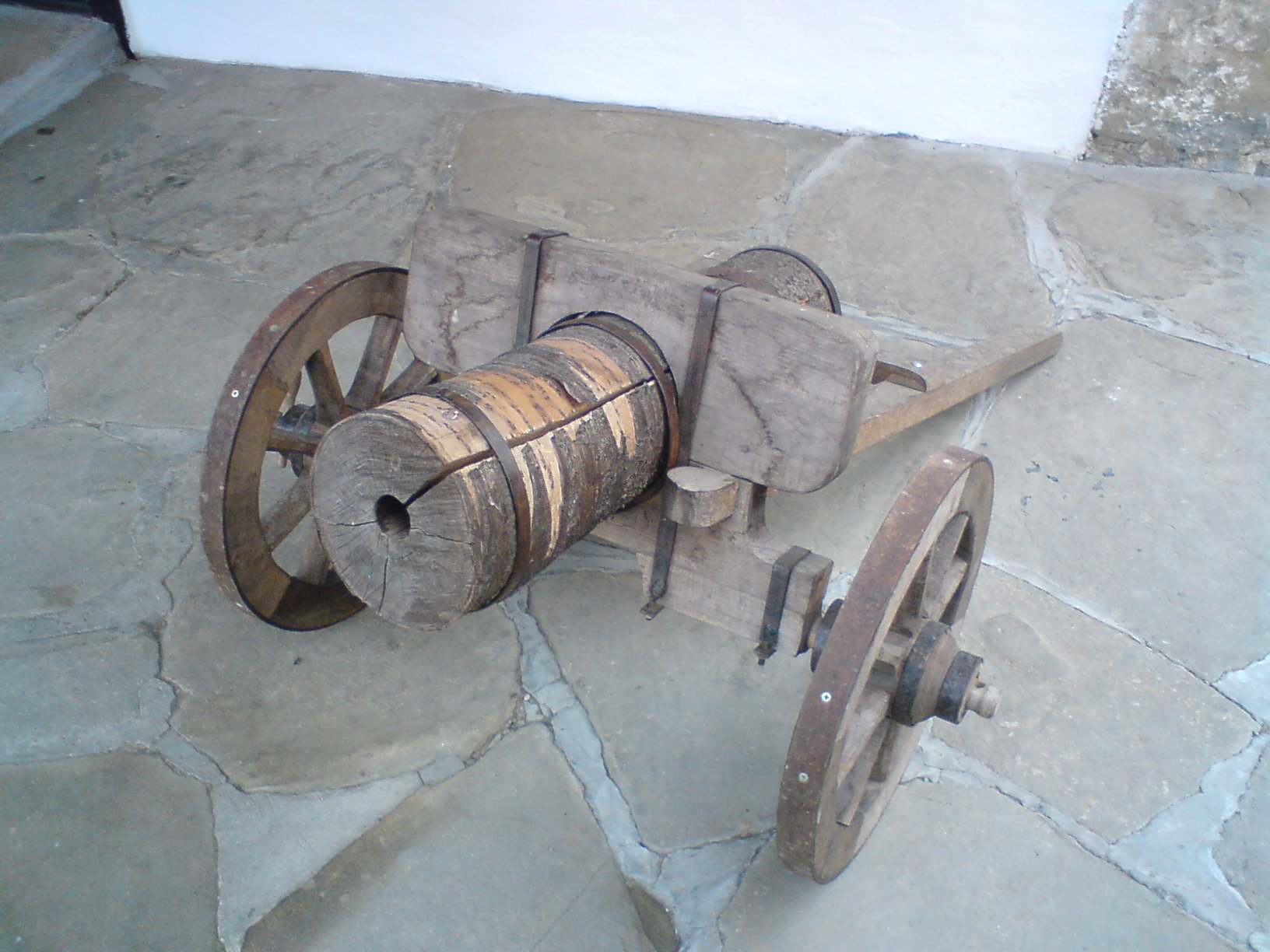
Reconstruction of a Bulgarian cherry cannon in Troyan.

The Cherry cannon (Bulgarian: Черешово топче, Chereshovo topche; Macedonian: Црешево топче, Creševo topče) is a wooden cannon and artillery weapon whose body is made entirely from acacia or cherry. It has no significant combat value, as the wood shatters under explosion after only a few shots, but it is very easy to make a cannon from cherry wood in a very short time, and easy to transport from one place to another.

== History ==
It was first used by Bulgarian anti-Ottoman revolutionaries in the April Uprising. It was used to arm the under-equipped Bulgarian rebels against the Ottoman army. Balance scale masses and pieces of metal were used as ammunition for the cherry cannon. The first cherry guns were created in the spring of 1876. Later cherry guns were used by the Bulgarian anti-Ottoman revolutionaries in the Kruševo Republic and at other places of insurgency during the Ilinden–Preobrazhenie Uprising in 1903. In practice, this uprising was designed as a belated replica of the April Uprising of 1876.

=== Legacy ===
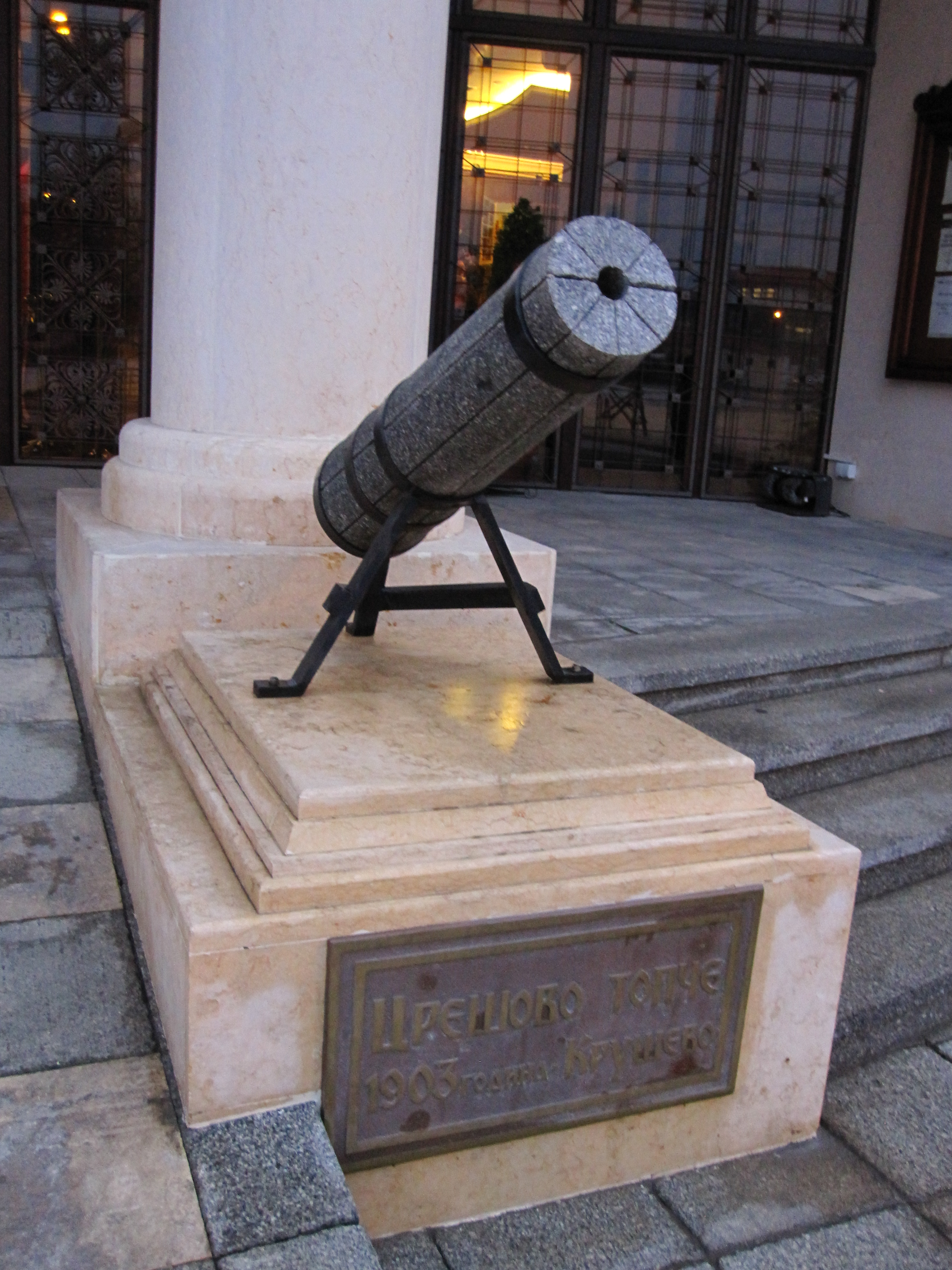
A replica of a cherry gun, in front of the Museum of the Macedonian Struggle in Skopje.

The only original cherry cannon from the April Uprising of 1876 is kept in the museum of Bratsigovo, Bulgaria. The only cherry cannon that survived the Ilinden–Preobrazhenie Uprising is the one captured in 1903 by the Ottoman army after the battle with the insurgents near Kruševo, after an entire insurgent company died defending the concession in the escape of the population from Kruševo. That cherry cannon was then transferred by the Turks to the Istanbul Military Museum.

In 2003, on the occasion of the 100th anniversary of the Ilinden Uprising, a cherry cannon from the museum in Istanbul was loaned for three months for an exhibition in the national museum in then Republic of Macedonia. In 2014, Macedonian historians visited the Istanbul military museum for research purposes and discovered that two cherry guns from the Ilinden Uprising have been stored there. The exhibits from the beginning of the 20th century appeared as being from the "Bulgar millet". After an official protest from the Macedonian delegation, the origin of the guns was changed to "Makedon millet". However, from a historical perspective a Macedonian millet never existed.

== Sources ==
- Bakalov, Georgi (2007). Military history of Bulgarians from the Antiquity to present day (in Bulgarian). TRUD Publishers. p. 309. ISBN 978-954-621-235-1.
