= Albrecht mortar =

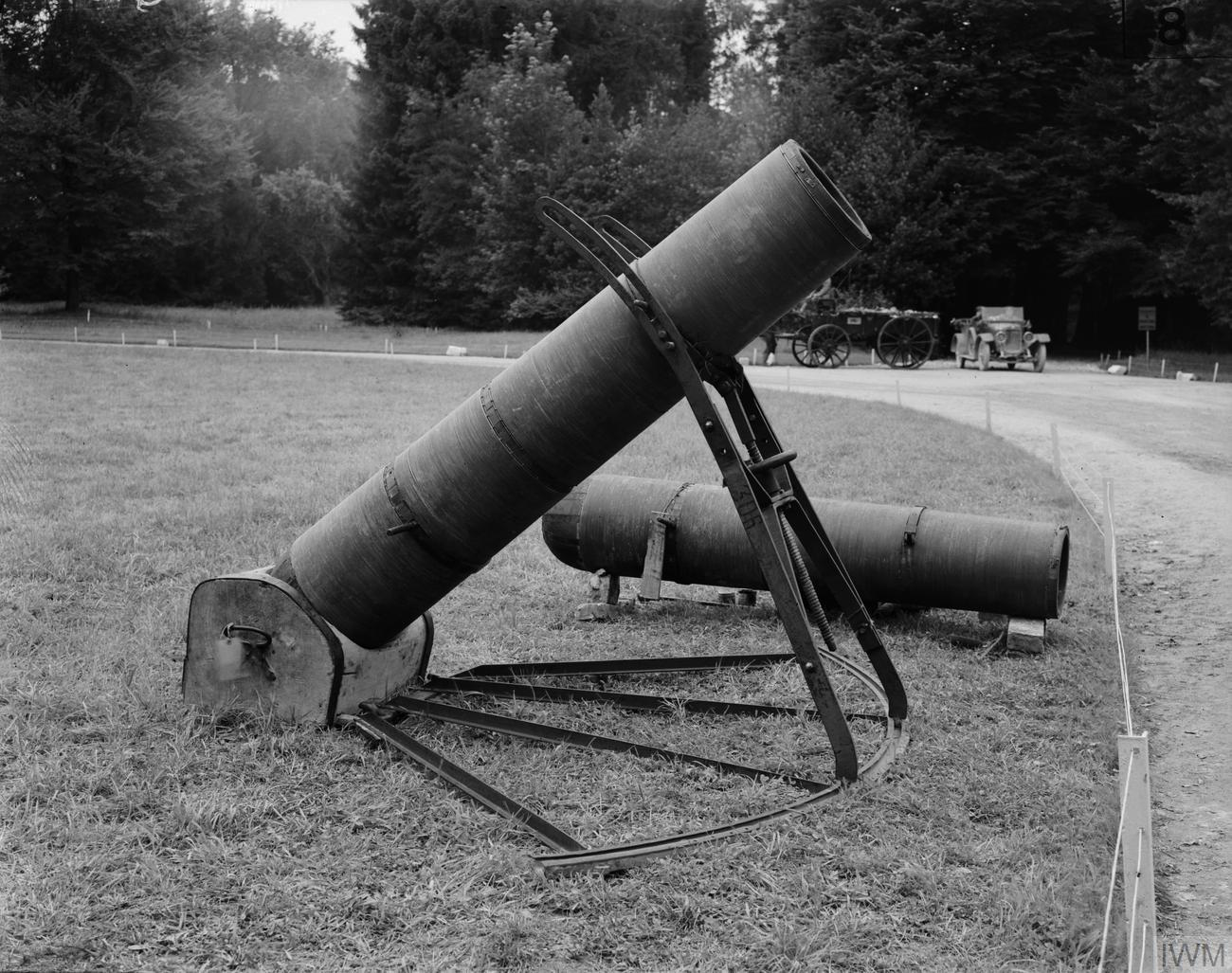
- A 25 cm sMW
- Type: Heavy mortar
- Place of origin: German Empire

Service history
- In service: 1916–1918
- Used by: German Empire
- Wars: World War I

Production history
- Designer: Albrecht
- Designed: 1915
- Manufacturer: Albrecht
- Produced: 1916–18
- Variants: 25 cm 35 cm 45 cm

Specifications
- Mass: 289 kg (637 lb)
- Length: 1.8 m (5 ft 11 in)
- Width: 2.3 m (7 ft 7 in)
- Height: 1.6 m (5 ft 3 in)
- Shell: Separate loading charge and 23.5 kg (52 lb) projectile
- Caliber: 25 cm (9.8 in)
- Breech: Muzzle loaded
- Recoil: None
- Carriage: Two-wheeled
- Elevation: 45°
- Traverse: None
- Maximum firing range: 600 m (660 yd)

Albrecht mortars or Albrecht Schwerer Minenwerfers ('heavy mortar launchers') were a series of wooden heavy mortars used by the Imperial German Army during the First World War.

== History ==
Although the majority of combatants had heavy field artillery prior to the outbreak of the First World War, none had adequate numbers in service, nor had they foreseen the growing importance of heavy artillery once the Western Front stagnated and trench warfare set in.

Besides land mines, machine guns and trenches, barbed wire was a persistent threat to attacking infantry. Often barbed wire was used to channel attackers away from vulnerable areas of a defenders trenches and funnel attackers into predefined kill zones where overlapping fields of machine gun fire could be brought to bear. Rows of barbed wire could also be used to delay attackers allowing defenders time to man their trenches and to hold attackers at a safe distance to allow defenders to call in defensive artillery fire.

What was needed to overcome the deadlock and give attackers an advantage was light, portable, simple, and inexpensive heavy firepower. A way to provide this was by designing a series of heavy trench mortars which could be brought to forward area trenches to launch heavy, short ranged preparatory bombardments to clear obstacles and neutralize enemy defenses.

== Design ==
The Albrecht mortars came in a number of lengths and diameters 25–45 cm (10–18 in) each with their own projectiles. They consisted of a muzzle loaded smooth bore barrel built from wooden staves and wound with galvanized wire for reinforcement. The base of the mortar was a large wooden block and there was a crescent-shaped adjustable metal stand with a hand wheel to adjust elevation.

== Ammunition ==
The propellant and projectiles were loaded separately and the projectile was a simple metal can with a reinforced wooden base and a wooden lid with handle. The projectile was filled with explosives and metal fragments. Range 50–600 m (55–656 yd) was controlled by a combination of varying elevation and amounts 50–700 g (2 oz – 1 lb 9 oz) of propellant.

Projectiles weighed from 23.5 kg (52 lb) for the 25 cm, to 100 kg (220 lb) for the 35 cm, and 200 kg (440 lb) for the 45 cm model. Accuracy, velocity, and range were all considered to be poor. The early projectiles also had poor aerodynamics, so later projectiles became more conical in shape. Due to poor aerodynamics, the projectiles sometimes fell on their side instead of their noses so timed fuses were used instead of impact fuses. The slow-moving projectiles were given the nickname of "coal buckets" by the French.

== Photo gallery ==
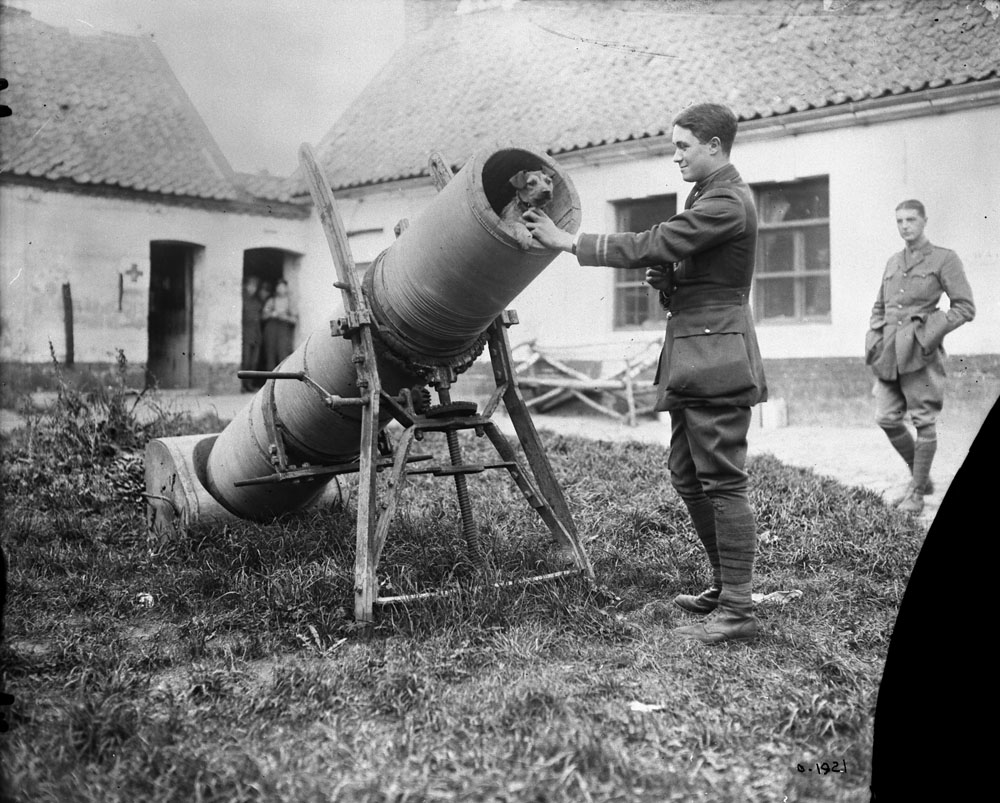
A captured Albrecht mortar showing its size

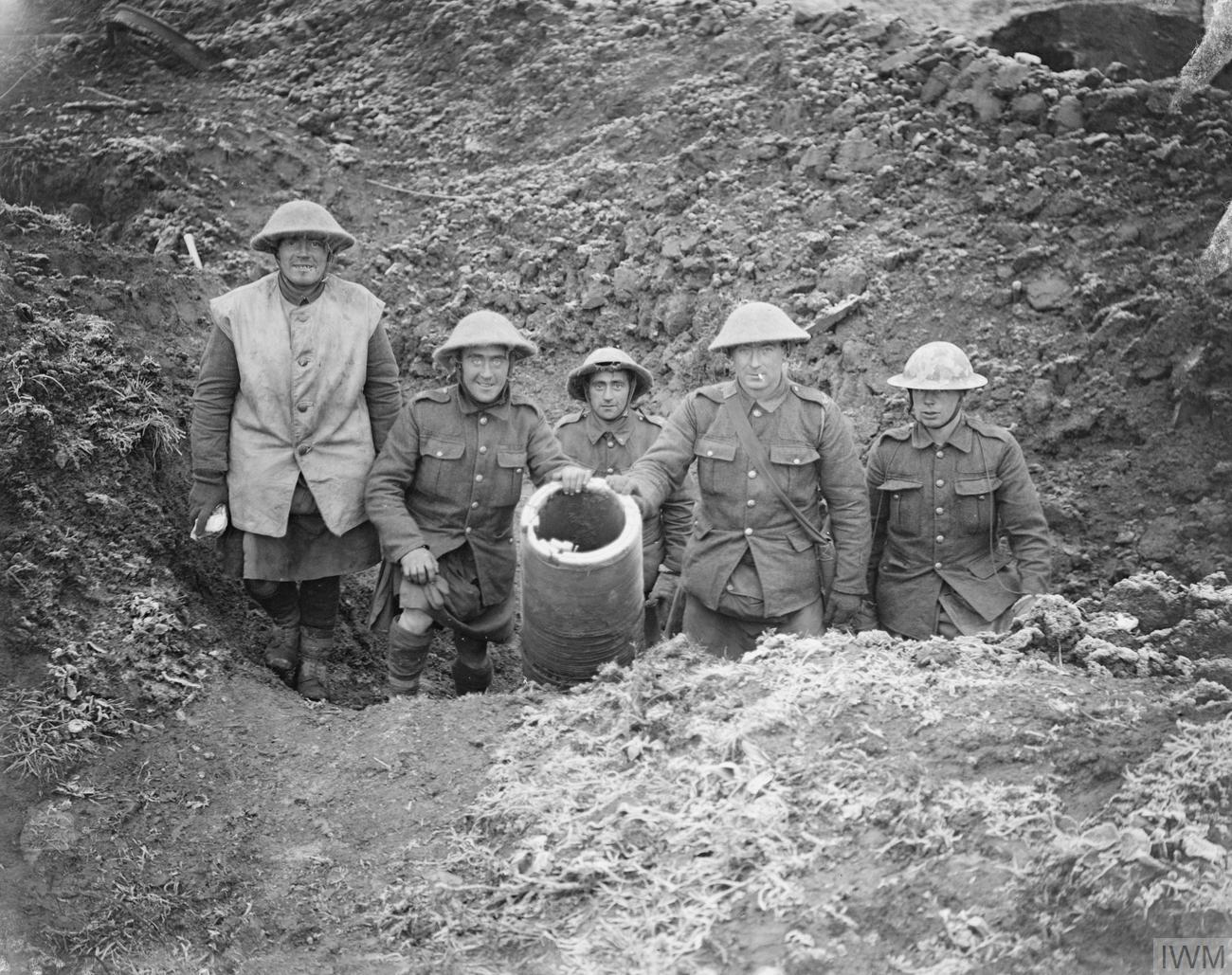
British soldiers with a mortar captured during the Battle of the Somme

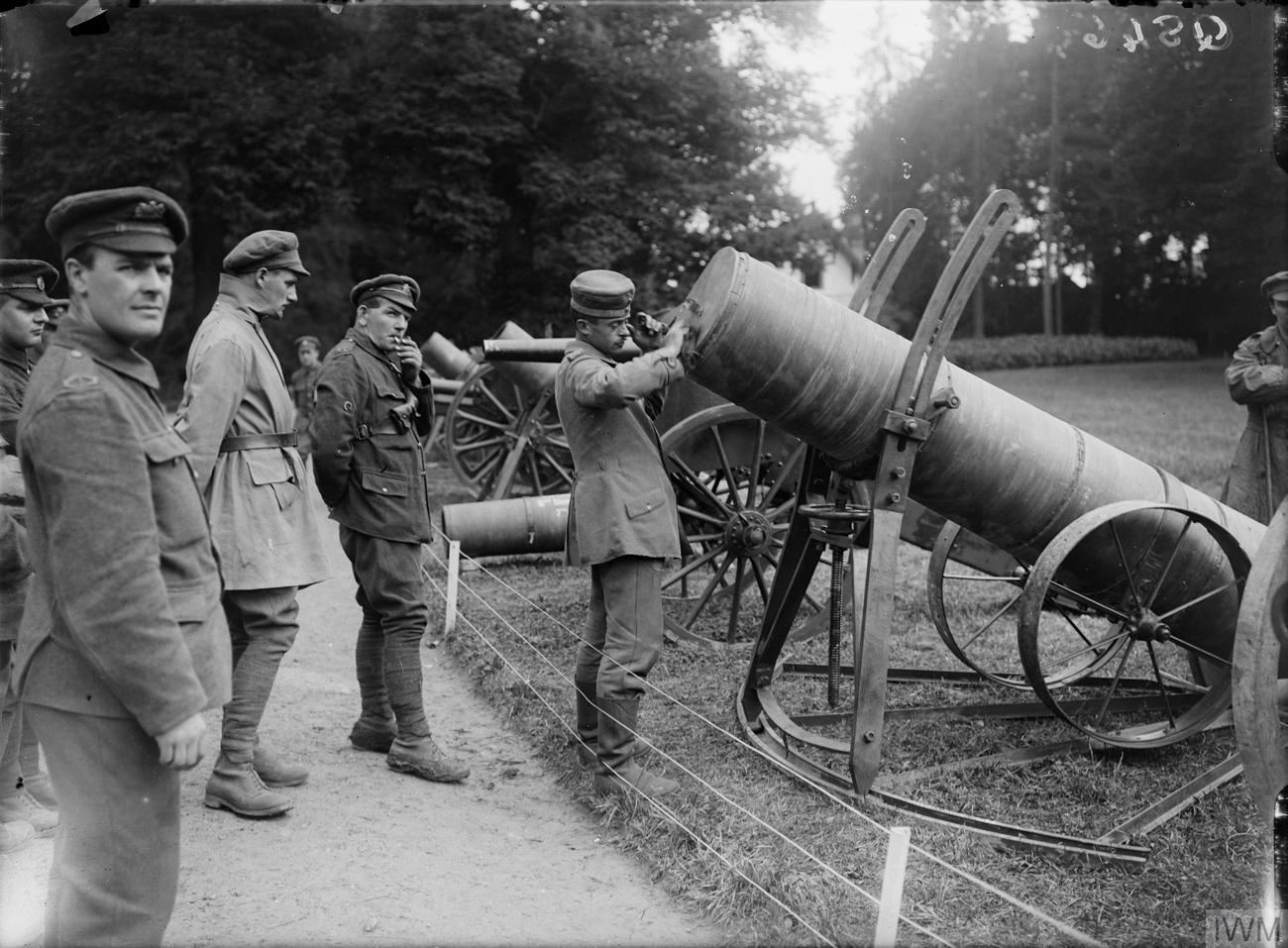
German artillery captured during the Battle of the Somme
