= Wooden cannon =

Type of gunpowder artillery made primarily of wood instead of the usual metal

Wooden cannons have been manufactured and used in wars in many countries. The wooden parts were invariably strengthened with metal fittings or even rope.

== Expedient technique ==
The use of wood for cannon-making could be dictated either by the lack of metal or the lack of skill to engineer metallic cannons. Wooden cannons were notoriously weak, and could usually fire only a few shots, sometimes even just one shot, before bursting. The balls for use in such wooden-barreled cannons could be made of various materials such as wood, stone, ceramics, or steel.

The barrel could be sometimes coated with tin in the interior, having the exterior reinforced with 8–10 iron rings. The firing system was identical with the one used on flintlocks.

The cannons could fire a variety of projectiles, from cannonballs made of iron, wood, or rock, to incendiary materials and a type of grapeshots (a load of smaller rocks with sharp edges to increase damage upon attacking compact infantry formations). Also, they were used as a psychological weapon, firing without projectiles, simply for the sound, which was enough to create a state of panic in enemy ranks, thinking that they are being attacked by artillery. In the mountains, the sound was reverberated by the mountain slopes, the sound being thus repeated and amplified.

Wooden cannons have been used at various times. Aurangzeb in the Deccan used such cannons for defensive purposes, as he lacked regular cannons but had abundant wood available.

Wooden cannons were used by the Vietnamese against the French during the Cochinchina campaign in 1862. Some Japanese forces used wooden cannons during the Boshin war in 1868. Native peoples of South America used wooden cannons against the Spanish and Portuguese during the 17th and 18th centuries. The Native Americans in North America used improvised wooden cannons against fortifications. Squire Boone also constructed a wooden cannon used in the defense of Boonesborough, Kentucky in 1778 Siege of Boonesborough.

Wooden cannons were used in Europe on various occasions. Russian Tsar Peter the Great is known to have built several as a childhood pastime.

Romanians (moți) from the Apuseni Mountains in Transylvania manufactured this type of cannon extensively for use against the Hungarian army in 1848–49. The wooden cannons had various calibers, up to 120–150 millimetres, and were made from fir, cherry, or beech trees. They were made using man-powered drills to obtain the desired caliber. In battle, the largest-caliber cannons were employed from fixed positions, whereas cannons of smaller calibers could be deployed in the field, carried on man-drawn or horse-drawn carriages, or transported on horseback via pack saddles.

During the April Uprising in 1876, the Bulgarians used 52 cherry-wood cannons. The barrels were lined inside with copper tubes. After a few shots, the guns would begin to crack, and were reinforced with ropes soaked in tar. During the Ilinden-Preobrazhenie Uprising in 1903 the Bulgarian partisans in Macedonia likewise produced cherry-wood cannons.

During World War I the Imperial German Army developed a series of heavy wooden mortars.

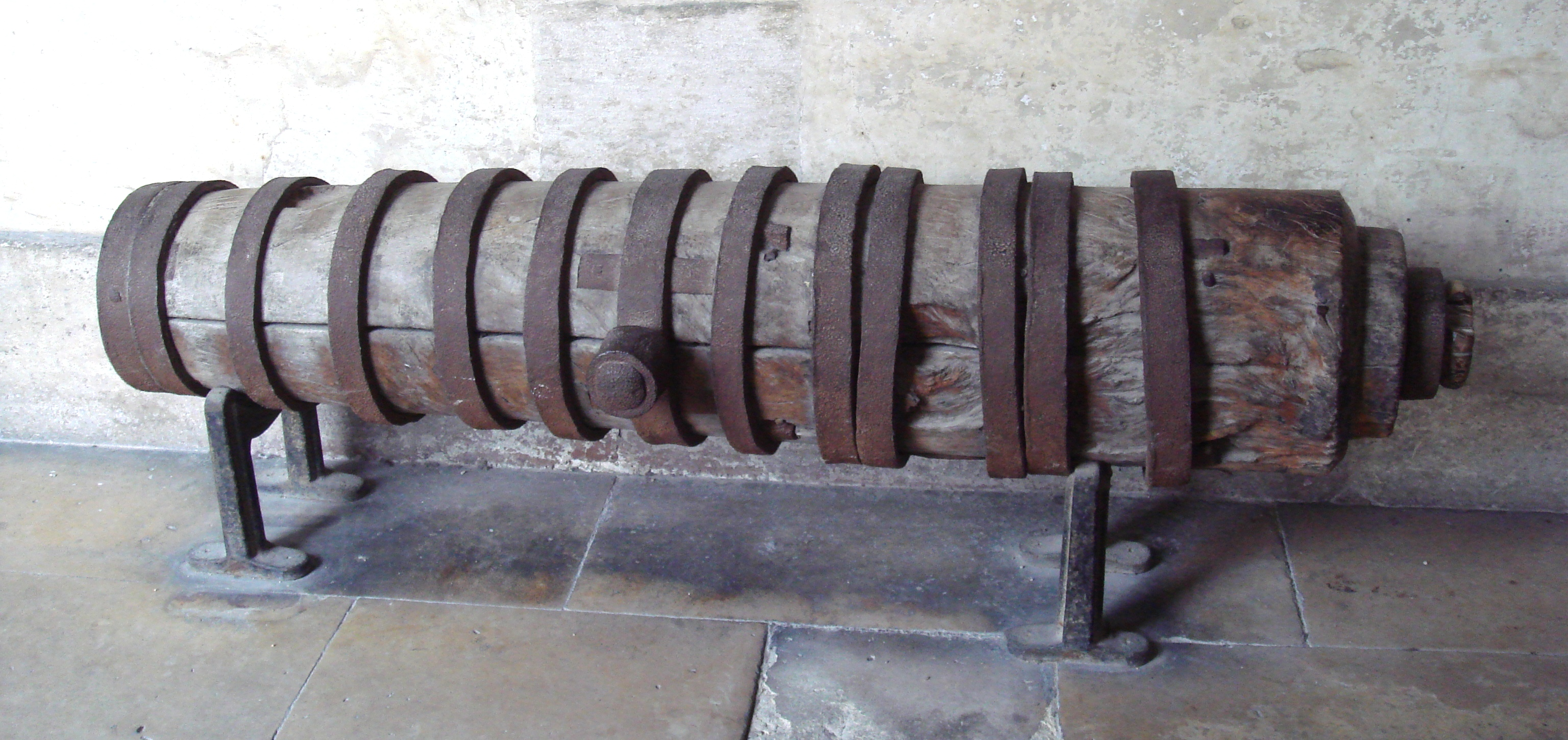
Vietnamese wooden cannon captured at the Vinh Long citadel by the French on 23 March 1862. Muzzle diameter: 97 mm. Length: 1.90 m. Musée de l'Armée, Paris

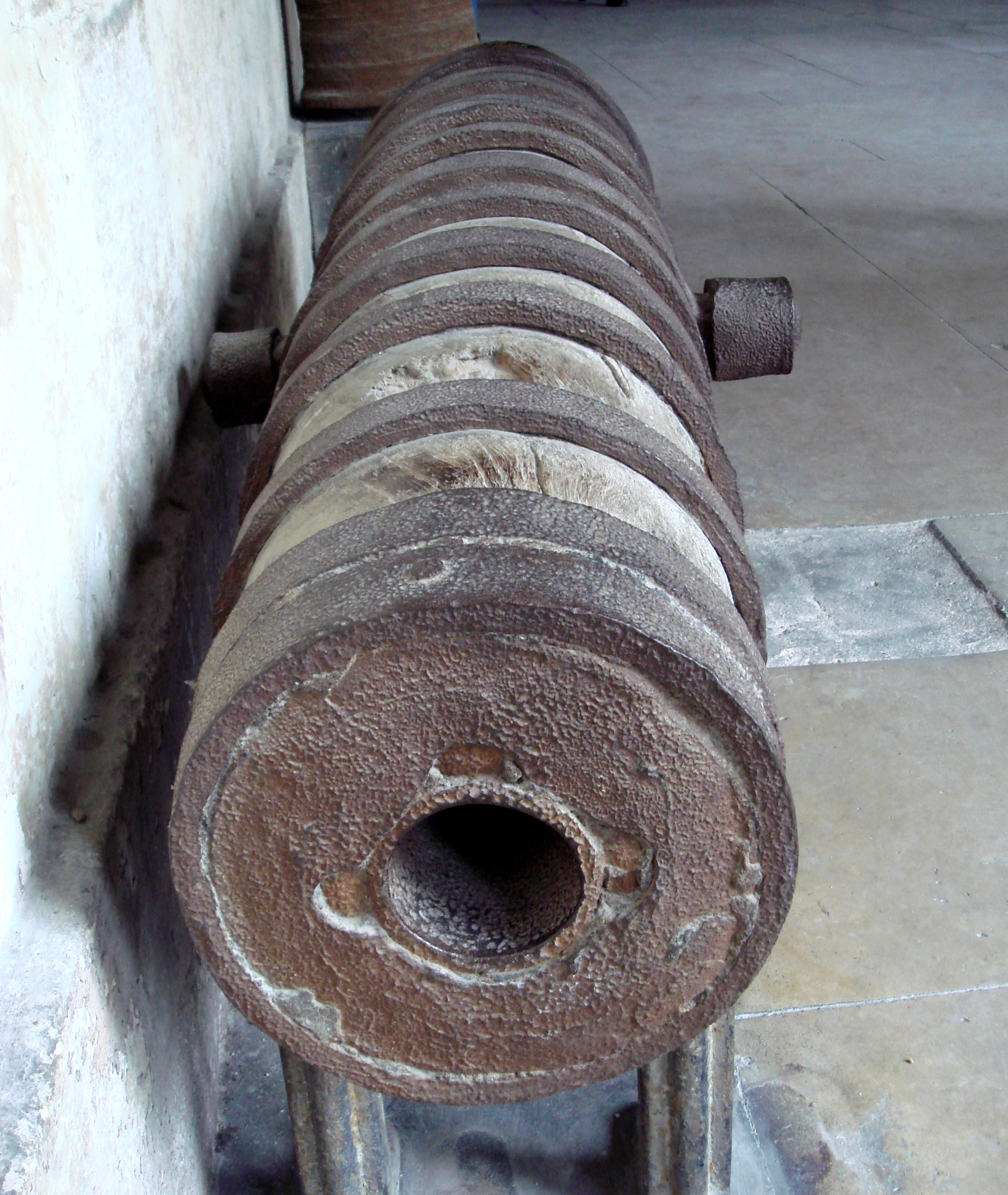
Muzzle of Vietnamese wooden cannon, 1862, Vĩnh Long

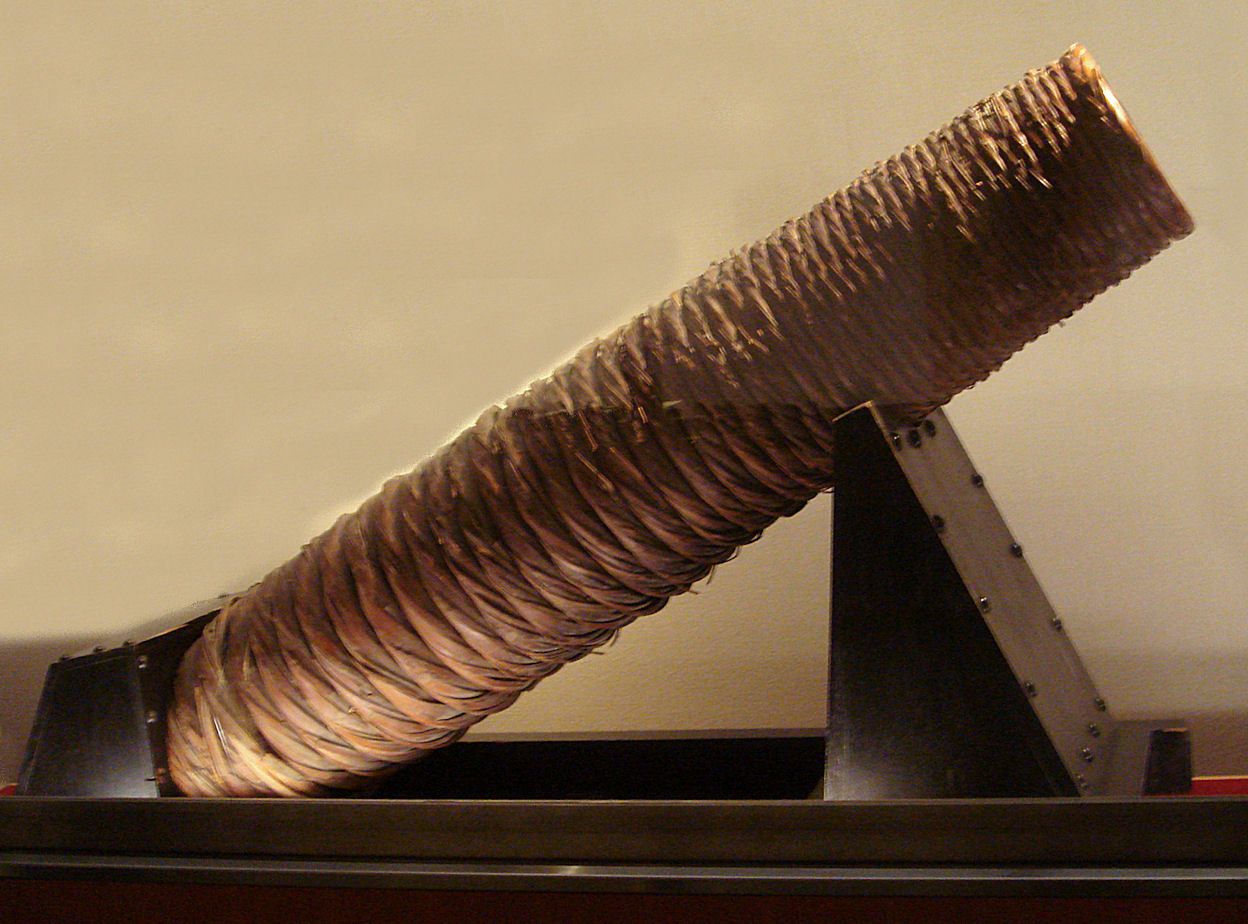
Japanese coastal wooden cannon built by the daimyōs at the Bakufu's order for Commodore Perry's arrival. 1853–54

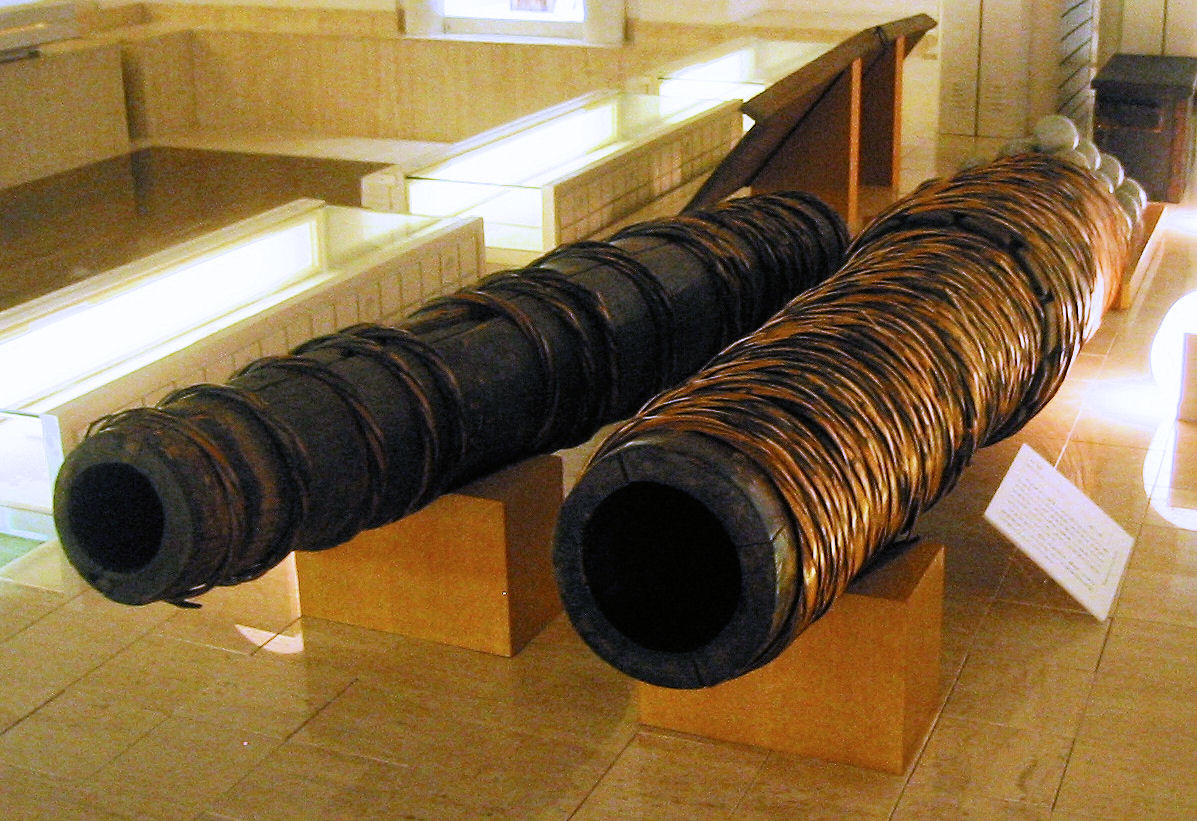
Wooden cannons used by the Sendai fief during the Boshin War in Japan in 1868. Sendai City Museum

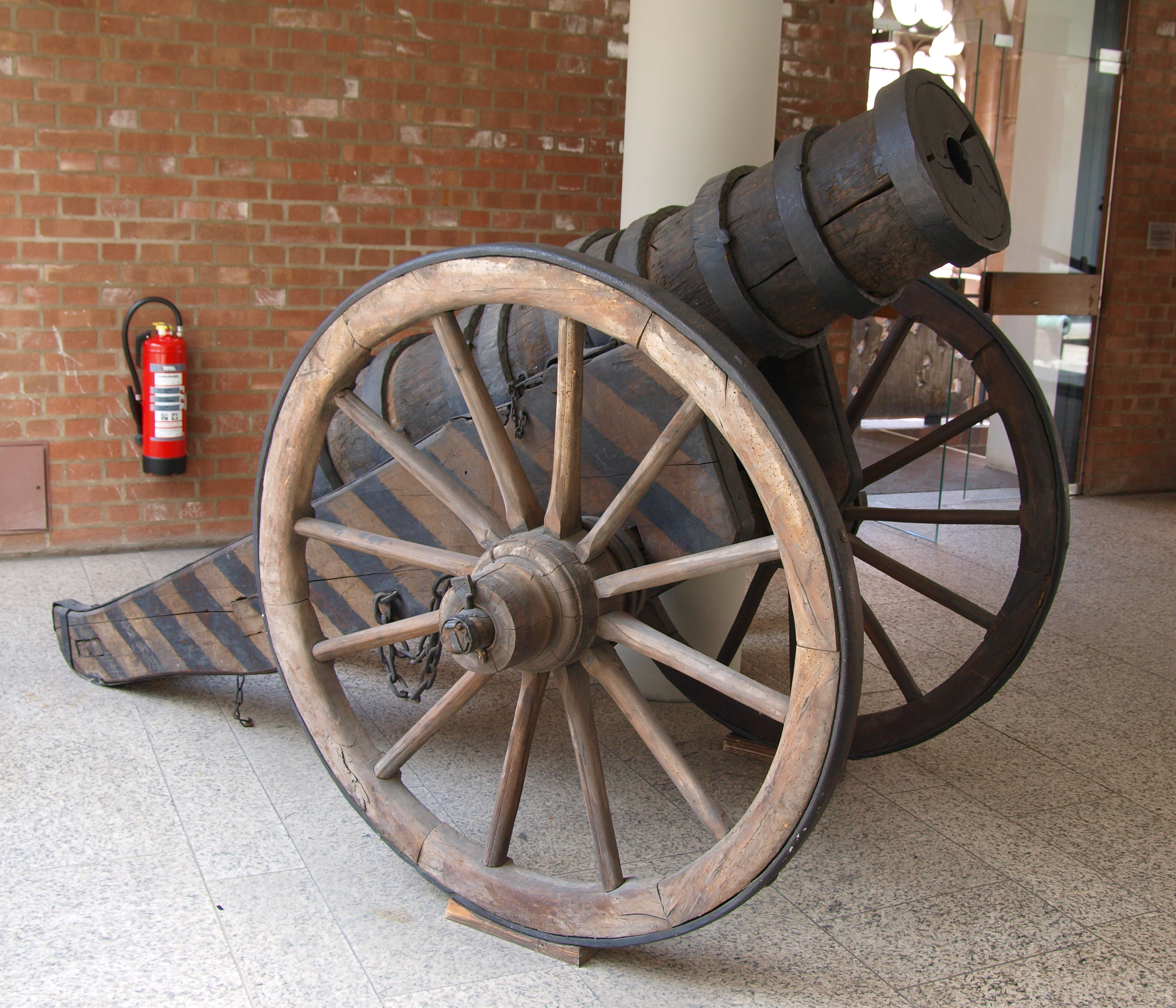
European wooden cannon. Muzzle diameter: 90 mm. Wooden barrel with thin iron insert and iron rings supporting the barrel. Germanisches Nationalmuseum Nuremberg

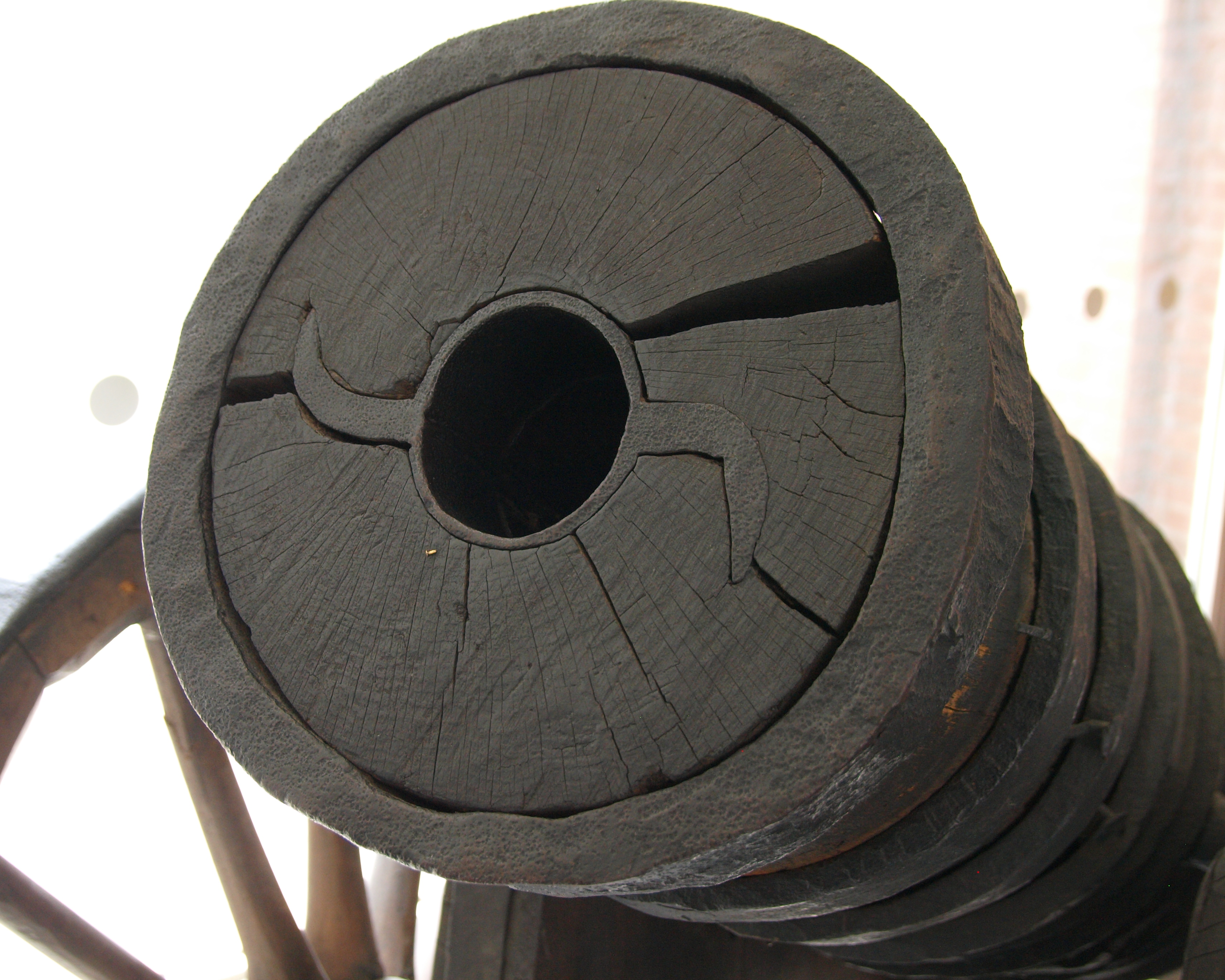
Muzzle of the cannon shown in the previous picture

== Deception method ==
In some wars, fake cannons made from a wooden log, sometimes painted black, were used to deceive an enemy. Misleading the enemy as to the strength of an emplacement was an effective delaying tactic. Both sides of the American Civil War used such faked weapons, called Quaker guns. The name derives from the Religious Society of Friends or "Quakers", who have traditionally held a religious opposition to war and violence in the Peace Testimony.

== See also ==
- Bamboo cannon
- Leather cannon
