= Leather cannon =

Type of 17th century artillery

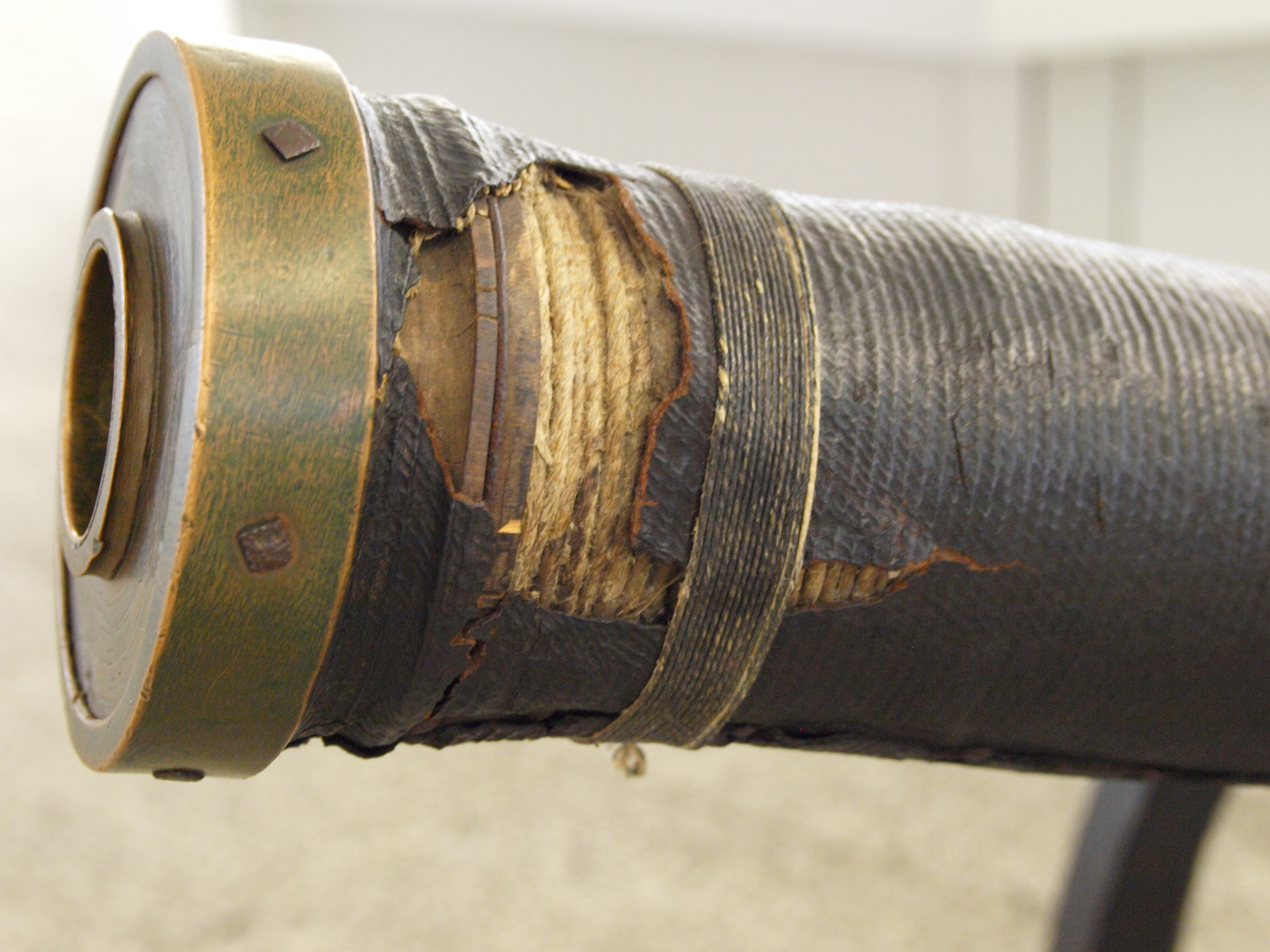
The muzzle of a leather cannon in the collection of the Germanisches Nationalmuseum

The leather cannon, or leather gun, was an experimental weapon, first used in northern Europe in the 1620s. The aim was to construct a light and cheap weapon that would bridge the gap between the hand-held musket and the heavy stationary cannon. The varnished leather from which the gun got its name acted merely as the outer protective surface of the piece.

The first working examples were built by Swiss and Austrian engineers. The first attempts to use them in combat were made by Gustavus Adolphus of Sweden, during the Polish–Swedish War (1626–1629), but were largely unsuccessful. They were used extensively during the English Civil Wars in the 1640s and 1650s, especially in Scotland.

== Background ==
Cannons in the early 17th century were of a plethora of calibers. In order to simplify logistics Gustavus Adolphus reduced the number of calibers to guns firing 24-, 12- and 6-pound cannonballs (roughly 11, 5.4 and 2.7 kg). Guns made from cast iron were too heavy to be moved during battle, and were used only in fortresses or aboard ships. Guns used in the field were limited to bronze cannon, but only the very lightest pieces could be moved during battle and usually only if the terrain was even.

Gustavus Adolphus' tactics were based on use of effective firepower. While heavy cannon were effective at the start of the battle, they could not be moved from the hill that they usually were deployed on (the guns themselves weighed from roughly 300 kilograms (660 lb) to 3 tons (3,000 kg). As such, the artillery could not respond effectively to developments in battle.

== Leather cannon ==
To fill the gap, the so-called leather cannon was developed. A relatively thin copper tube was reinforced by heavy cords and finally clad in leather (alternatively clad in leather straps first and then rope cords). While the weapon was light enough to be mobile (it required only a two-man crew to pull into position and operate), and at the same time was cheaper in construction, the basic design proved to be flawed. The reinforcing materials acted as an insulator, and did not allow heat to dissipate fast enough. After only a few shots the gun would be too hot to use. The heat would also deform the tube and drastically decrease accuracy. Once damaged thus, even after being allowed to cool, the barrel was prone to bursting, severely injuring the loader. As a field weapon it was too unreliable to be viable.

The weapon had achieved one important success – it demonstrated the usefulness of mobile fire support. Before Sweden's entry in the Thirty Years' War, a new weapon had been developed, the bronze 3-pounder regimental cannon. This could be towed by a single horse or three men and had a rate of fire 50% faster than the muskets of the period.

== Use in Scotland and Korea ==
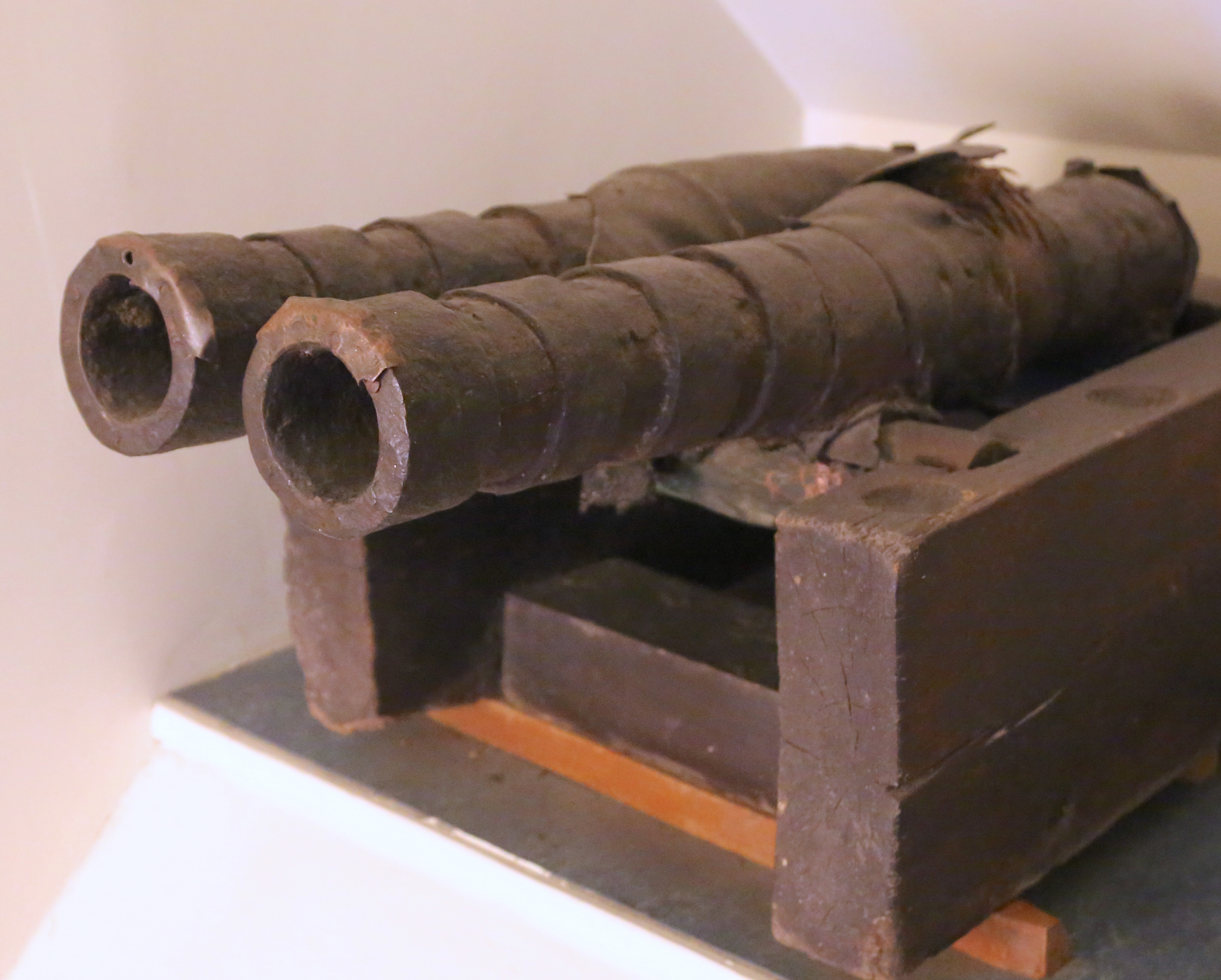
A pair of leather cannon in the West Highland Museum

While short-lived, the leather cannon was copied by numerous nations of Europe, most notably Scotland.

In Korea, during the Joseon Dynasty, leather guns make their appearance in government records from at least 1649. They were hailed for their lightness, and therefore, superior manoeuvrability. The only difference between the Korean leather cannon and that of Europe was that the Korean counterpart was covered in thick Korean paper heavily saturated with grease. For several decades after its adoption, hundreds of leather cannon were produced, indicating their popularity. Similar to its European counterpart, it also fired iron shot weighing about 4 pounds (1.8 kg).

== Survivors ==
Very few original leather cannon have survived to modern times. There is one in the Palace Armoury museum in Valletta, Malta.

== See also ==
- Bamboo cannon
- Battalion gun
- Wooden cannon
- Grasshopper cannon
- Carl-Gustaf recoilless rifle - A modern weapon that since 1991 uses a thin pipe which is tightly wound with carbon fibre thread to help withstand the pressure of the explosion, thus saving a lot of weight.

== Bibliography ==
- Adair, John (1997-04-24). Roundhead General: Campaigns of Sir William Waller. Sutton Publishing Limited. ISBN 0-7509-1312-6.
- Brzezinski, Richard, The Army of Gustavus Adolphus: (2) Cavalry, Oxford: Osprey, 1993, especially pp. 17–20.
- Lappalainen, Jussi T., Sadan vuoden sotatie, Suomen sotilaat 1617-1721, Jyväskylä: Gummerus 2001 ISBN 951-746-286-7
