= Quaker gun =

Fake gun used as a deception tactic in warfare

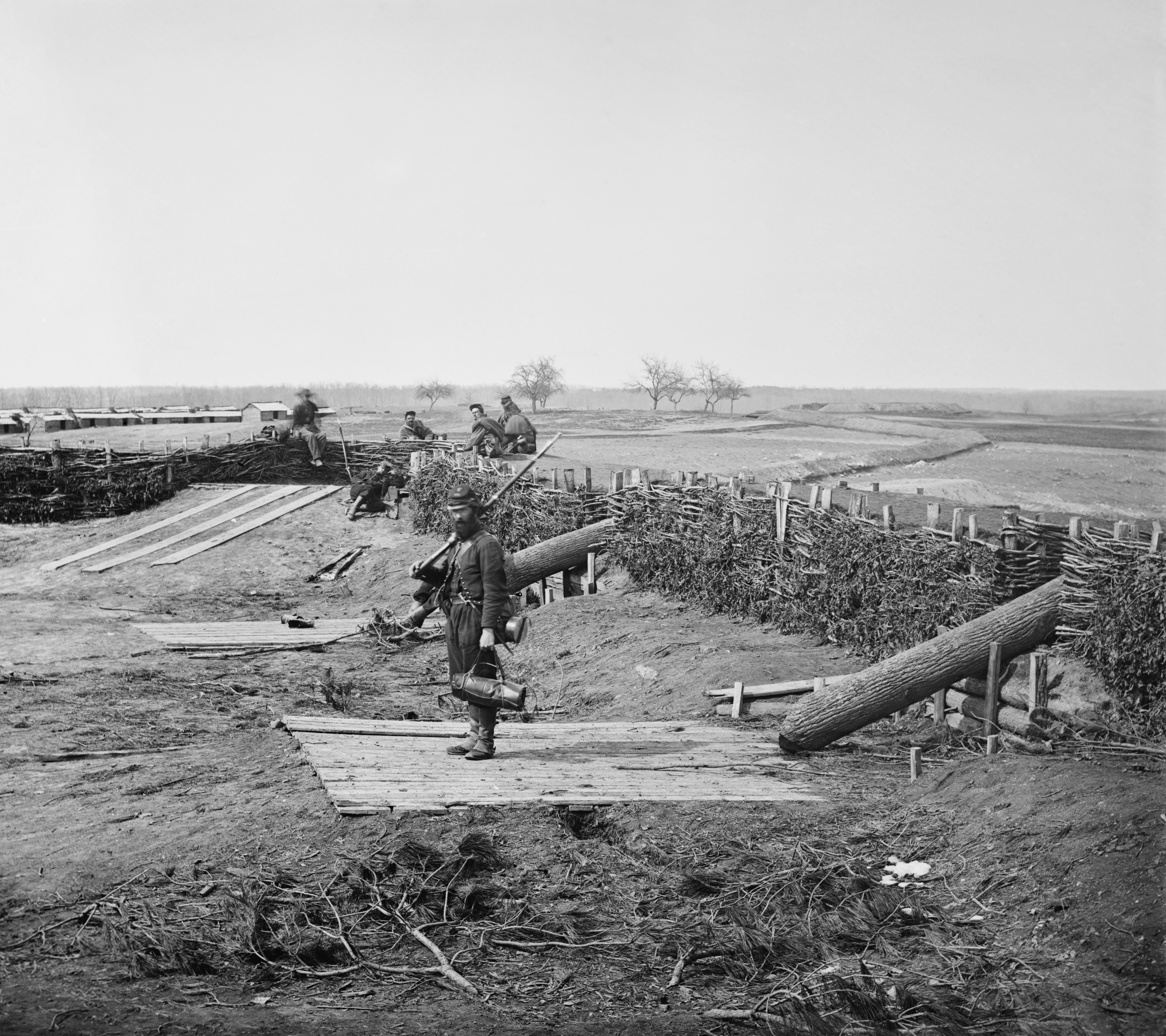
"Quaker guns" (logs used as ruses to imitate cannons) in former Confederate fortifications at Manassas Junction March 1862

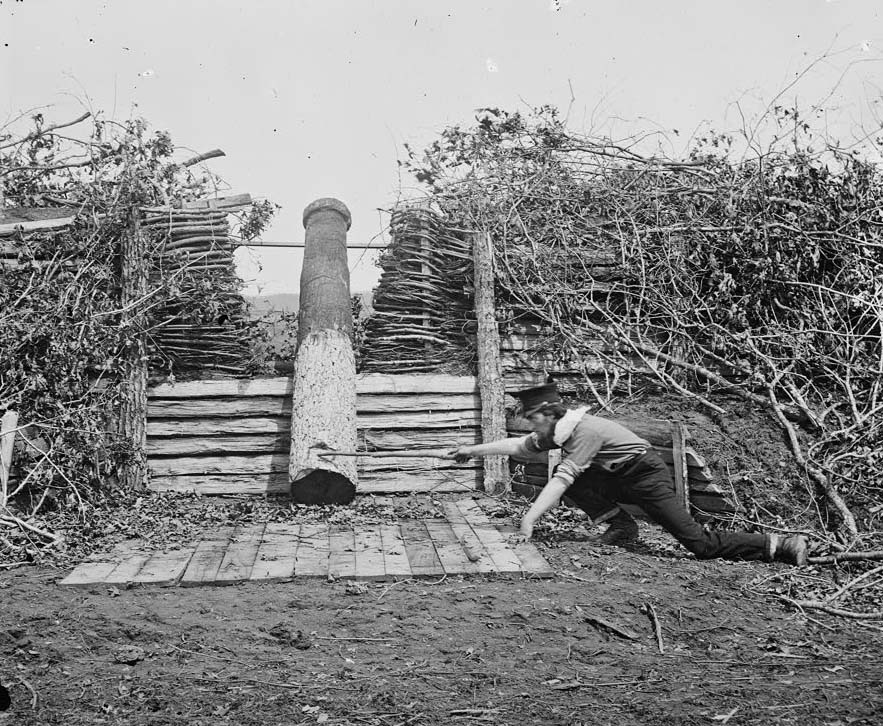
Quaker gun near Centreville, Virginia, in March 1862, after the Confederate withdrawal; a man with a stick is pretending to "fire" it with a linstock

A Quaker gun is a deception tactic that was commonly used in warfare during the 18th and 19th centuries. Although resembling an actual cannon, the Quaker gun was simply a wooden log, usually painted black, used to deceive an enemy. Misleading the enemy as to the strength of an emplacement was an effective delaying tactic. The name derives from the Religious Society of Friends or "Quakers", who have traditionally held a religious opposition to war and violence in the Peace Testimony.

== The original "Quaker gun trick" ==
During the American War of Independence, after nearly a year of brutal backcountry conflict between American Colonel William Washington and the British commander Lieutenant Colonel Banastre Tarleton, Colonel Washington had retreated to North Carolina in October 1780.

Ordered to leave a regular force of colonial dragoons in the North Carolina theater by Brigadier General Daniel Morgan, Colonel Washington still lacked the proper artillery to dislodge the Loyalists. On December 4, the Americans were able to trap the Loyalist Colonel Rowland Rugeley and his force of about 125 men in Rugeley's house and barn near Camden, South Carolina. Washington told his cavalrymen to dismount and surround the barn. Out of Rugeley's sight, Washington's men prepared a pine log to resemble a cannon.

The "Quaker gun trick" worked. Colonel Washington aimed the wooden "cannon" toward the buildings in which the Loyalists had barricaded themselves and threatened to open fire if they did not immediately surrender. Rugeley quickly surrendered his entire force without a single shot being fired.

== Use in Europe ==
During the Siege of Genoa in 1800, the French forces commander, Andre Massena, placed wooden dummy cannons on the city walls to confuse and divert the besieging Austrian army.

== Use during the American Civil War ==
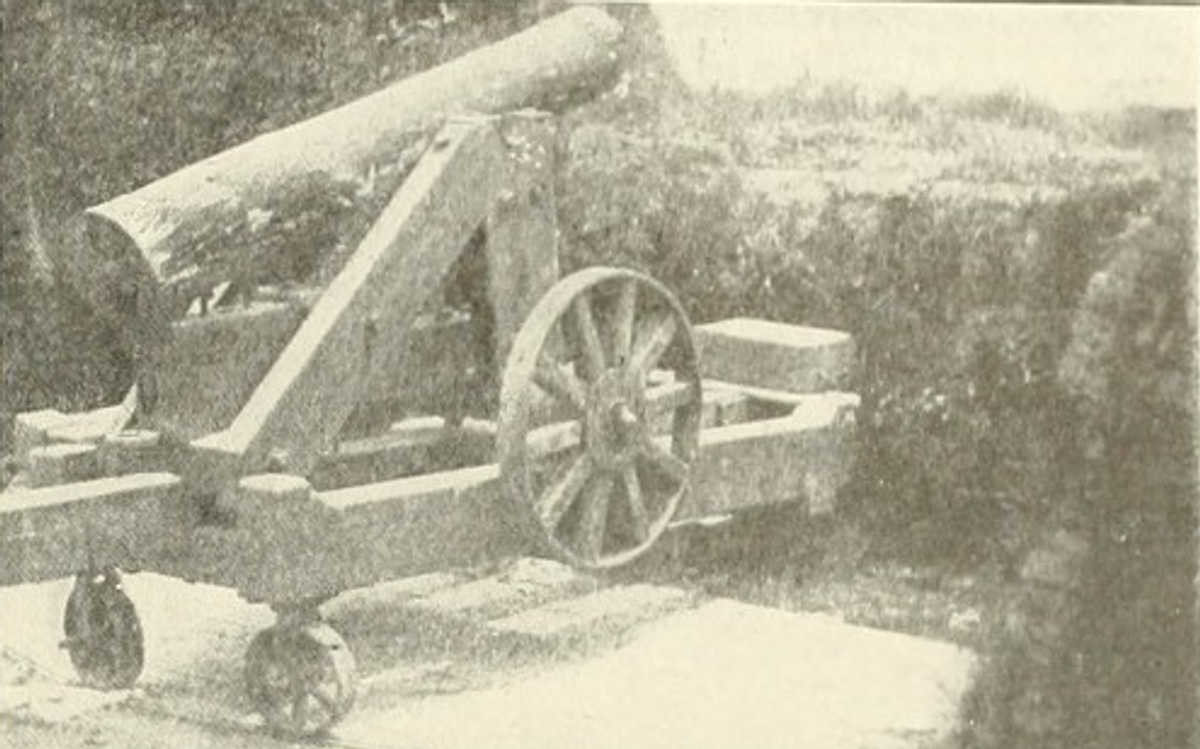
Quaker guns made of pine logs were mounted in a ruse to fool the Union into believing that the Confederates were much better armed at the Siege of Port Hudson, Louisiana in 1863 than they were. Black rings were painted on the end of the logs to make the muzzles look convincing. It worked. After Admiral Farragut's two vessels passed by Port Hudson, the Union chose never to attack from the river again.

Quaker guns were extensively used in the American Civil War. The Confederate States Army frequently resorted to them because of its shortage of artillery. The wooden guns were painted black and positioned in fortifications to delay Union assaults. Sometimes actual gun carriages were used in the deception.

One notable use of a Quaker gun was by Confederate General Joseph E. Johnston, who placed them in his field works around Centreville, Virginia, in March 1862, to give the appearance that the works were still occupied, while his men were actually withdrawing to the Rappahannock River.

Another example happened during the Siege of Corinth. "During the night of May 29, the Confederate army moved out. They used the Mobile and Ohio Railroad to carry the sick and wounded, the heavy artillery, and tons of supplies. When a train arrived, the troops cheered as though reinforcements were arriving. They set up dummy Quaker guns along the defensive earthworks. Camp fires were kept burning, and buglers and drummers played. The rest of the men slipped away undetected..."

Quaker guns were also used to bolster Confederate fortifications during the Siege of Petersburg. They assisted in prolonging the Confederates' hold on their positions against the overwhelmingly superior numbers of Union troops.

== Use during World War I ==
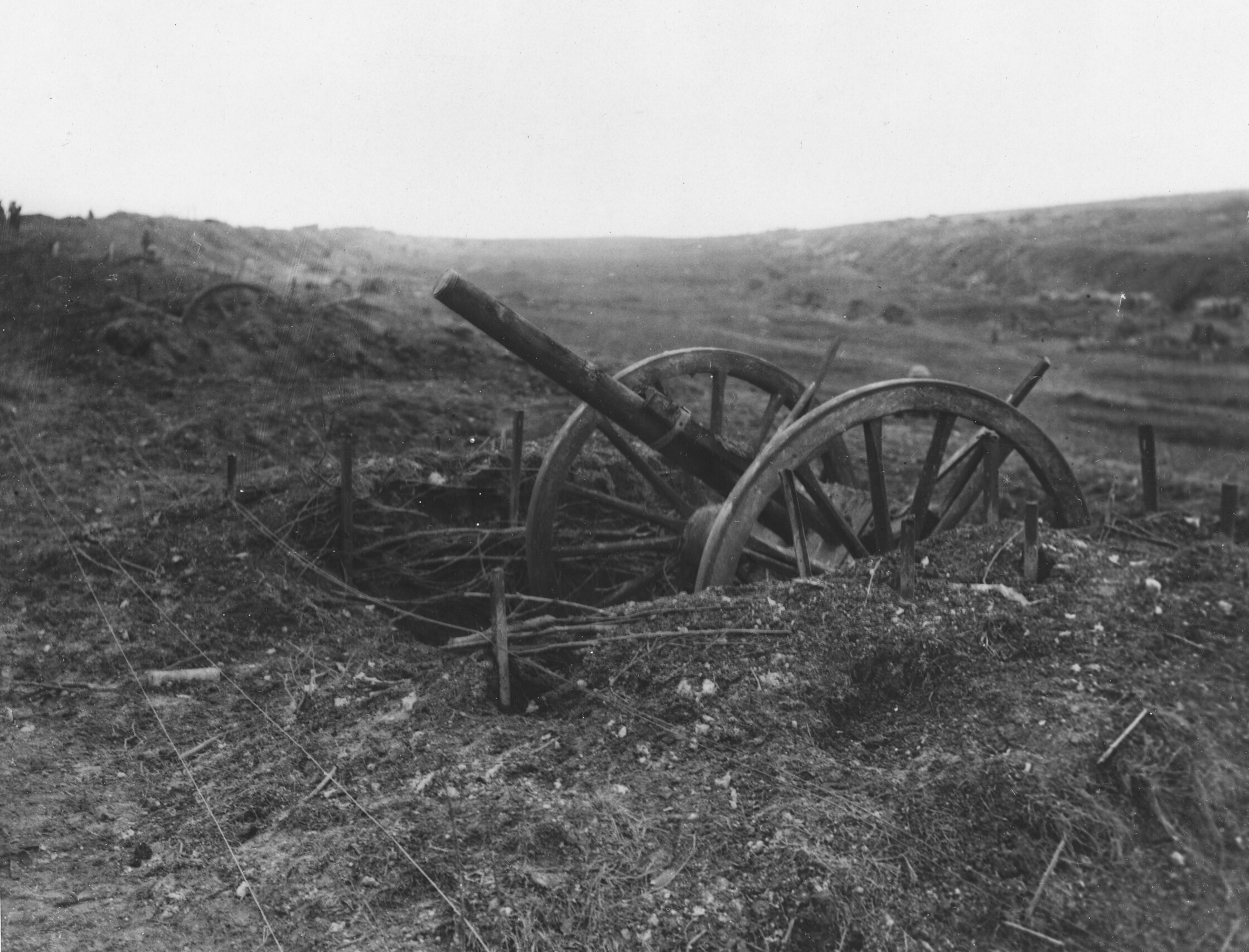
A fake German artillery piece in World War I, created to draw fire.

The widespread adoption of aerial reconnaissance in World War I led both sides to experiment with both deception operations and aerial camouflage.

== Use during World War II ==
A similar idea was employed during the Doolittle Raid, which occurred in the early stages of the Pacific War of World War II, where Lieutenant Colonel Jimmy Doolittle led a squadron of B-25 Mitchells to bomb Tokyo. The early model B-25B lacked any protective guns installed in the tail section, leaving them vulnerable to attacks from the rear. While modifying the bombers for the mission at Eglin Field, Florida, Doolittle had fake machine guns consisting of a pair of broomsticks painted black mounted at the tail end of the fuselage to simulate tail guns.

Similarly, while preparing for the coming invasion of France, the German forces on Pointe du Hoc moved their artillery battery and replaced it with upturned logs and barrels to spoof the photo-reconnaissance and fool the invading Allied forces. Dummy equipment was also used extensively by the Allies in Operation Fortitude, to persuade the Germans that a non-existent field army was preparing to attack Calais.

The pre–World War I British battleship HMS Centurion was obsolete and disarmed by World War II. However, from 1942 to 1944, she was fitted with wooden guns and stationed in the eastern Mediterranean, to make British naval forces in the area seem stronger than they were.

Fake gun emplacements, quickly constructed from local timber, were widely employed in the Soviet Union to fool and mislead German air reconnaissance.

== Wooden cannon ==
Unlike a Quaker gun, a wooden cannon is a functional weapon, albeit notoriously weak and only able to fire a few shots, sometimes even just one shot, before bursting. These were used by those without access to metal or the skill to construct metallic cannons.

== See also ==
- Dummy tank
- Empty Fort Strategy
- Military deception
- Military dummy
- Paradummy
- Victor Jones
