= Battle of Kirkuk (2014) =

Battle between Iraqi Kurdish forces and ISIL in Iraq

- Part of the Northern Iraq offensive (June 2014) during the War in Iraq (2013–2017)
Date	17 July–26 November 2014 (4 months, 1 week and 2 days)
Location	Kirkuk, Kirkuk Governorate, Iraq
Result	Kurdish victory; ISIL offensive is repelled multiple times; ISIL temporarily captures at least 4 villages

Belligerents
Kurdistan Region; Kurdistan Workers' Party; CJTF–OIR (air support)	Islamic State of Iraq and the Levant

Commanders and leaders
Masoud Barzani (President of Iraqi Kurdistan); Shirko Rauf (Brigadier General); Sherko Fatih Shwani (Major General)	(Islamic State) Abu Bakr al-Baghdadi (Self-declared "Caliph" of ISIL)

Units involved
Peshmerga; People's Defence Forces; Counter-Terrorism Group; Federal Police; Local gunmen	Military of the Islamic State

Casualties and losses
Many killed and injured	(Islamic State) Hundreds killed and injured
- At least 17 civilians killed and more than 20 injured in a ISIL car bombing

In the Battle of Kirkuk (2014) the Islamic State of Iraq and the Levant (ISIL) launched a series offensives against Peshmerga forces in Kirkuk city and its surrounding areas, which lasted from July 2014 to November 2014.

== Background ==
In May 2013, Peshmerga fighters took up positions on the outskirts of Kirkuk after Iraqi security forces (ISF) were redeployed elsewhere to deal with Sunni militants.

On 10 June 2014, ISIL and JRTN forces captured the second biggest city in Iraq, Mosul, after a 6-day battle in the city.

== The battle ==
On 17 June 2014, ISIL forces started an offensive with intent to capture Kirkuk. Soon after, the group attacked the village of Bashir 15 km south of Kirkuk city, where they clashed with local gunmen and police forces, assisted by the Peshmerga. After an hour of fighting the militants captured the village, leaving a senior Kurdish police brigadier wounded and six of his bodyguards killed. After taking control of the village ISIL massacred 52 Shi’a Turkmens.

With Bashir captured, ISIL moved forward and temporarily captured two sub-districts of the Kirkuk city: one in the west of it (Multaqa sub-district) and one in the south (Taza sub-district). Later that day, Peshmerga forces, with support of U.S.-led Coalition airstrikes, recaptured both sub-districts.

On 18 June, ISIL launched another offensive toward Kirkuk, this time targeting the northern part of the city and attempting to seize its oil fields. However, Peshmerga forces successfully repelled the attack and defended the city.

At the end of July, the Badr Organization recruited Shi’a Turkmen locals to recapture the village of Bashir in an attempted counter-offensive, which ultimately failed.

In December, ISIS claimed responsibility for a suicide car bomb attack on Kirkuk that killed at least 17 people and injured more than 20. The attack, according to ISIS, was meant to send a message to the Kurdish people and Peshmerga fighters.

== Aftermath ==
On the nights of 29 January and 30 January, ISIL attacked Kirkuk once again, leading to a new battle.
