= Ministry of Interior (Kurdistan Region) =

Kurdistan Region ministry

- وەزارەتی ناوخۆ; Wezaretî Nawxo
- Emblem of the Ministry of Interior

Ministry overview
- Formed: 1992
- Jurisdiction: Kurdistan Region
- Headquarters: Erbil, Kurdistan Region, Iraq
- Ministry executives: Masrour Barzani, Prime Minister; Rebar Ahmed Khalid, Minister
- Website: gov.krd/moi-en

The Ministry of Interior of the Kurdistan Region (Kurdish: وەزارەتی ناوخۆ, romanized: Wezaretî Nawxo) is the cabinet ministry of the Kurdistan Regional Government (KRG) responsible for internal security, law enforcement, civil administration, and the management of displaced persons and refugees within the Kurdistan Region. Headquartered in Erbil, it oversees the region's police forces, civil registration and residency services, and a range of internal security forces that operate under its authority.

== History ==
The Ministry of Interior was established in 1992, following the formation of the Kurdistan Regional Government in the aftermath of the 1991 Iraqi uprisings and the subsequent imposition of a no-fly zone in northern Iraq by the United States, the United Kingdom, and France. Together with the Ministry of Peshmerga Affairs (MoPA), it was among the first institutions of the nascent Kurdish self-governing authority. Whereas the MoPA focused on professionalising the existing party militias as an armed force, the Ministry of Interior was tasked with supervising the establishment of a police apparatus and the Asayish security forces to preserve order and prevent crime.

The formal legal basis of the ministry was the Law of the Ministry of Interior, No. 9 of 1993, passed by the Kurdistan Parliament. The Asayish, whose units had already been operating since late 1992, were given official legal recognition in March 1993, placing them under the ministry's authority and granting them jurisdiction over economic crimes, espionage, and acts of sabotage.

The outbreak of the Kurdish civil war in 1994 fractured the unified government, causing the Kurdistan Democratic Party (KDP) and the Patriotic Union of Kurdistan (PUK) to each operate their own separate administrations, each with its own distinct Ministry of Interior. This partition continued de facto until 2006, even though the Washington Agreement of 1998 formally ended hostilities. Following the 2003 US-led invasion of Iraq and the collapse of the Ba'ath Party regime, the two parties signed a power-sharing arrangement known as the "Strategic Agreement", under which the KDP and PUK agreed to share power equally and reunify their institutions. The ministry was formally reconstituted as a single institution in 2006.

In 2006, the KDP and the PUK transferred tens of thousands of their respective party-affiliated paramilitary forces into the Ministry of Interior and reclassified them as internal security forces: the KDP transferred approximately 45,000 Zeravani fighters, while the PUK transferred approximately 16,000 into what became the Defense and Emergency Forces (DEF). Together, these forces grew to approximately 90,000 personnel by the time of the Middle East Institute's 2021 assessment—an increase of roughly 30,000 since the initial transfer.

The legal framework governing the ministry's broader security mandate was reinforced by the 2005 Iraqi Constitution, Article 121 of which recognised the right of federal regions to establish and organise their own internal security forces, including the police and security services. In May 2009, when the KRG's Ministry of Interior was nominally unified in law, the Asayish was likewise formally unified. In practice, however, the parallel partisan chains of command within the ministry's forces persisted, with the KDP retaining primary influence over the Zeravani and the PUK over the Defense and Emergency Forces.

== Security forces ==
The Ministry of Interior oversees several armed formations that, in terms of manpower and operational significance, constitute the primary security presence in the Kurdistan Region following the withdrawal of Kurdish forces from disputed territories after the failed 2017 Kurdistan independence referendum.

=== Zeravani ===
The Zeravani (Kurdish: زێرەڤانی, "Guardian") are a militarised paramilitary gendarmerie force primarily affiliated with the KDP. They were established in 1997 to provide security for government property, electricity stations, water resources, embassies, consulates, and other sensitive infrastructure, including Erbil International Airport. After being formally transferred to the Ministry of Interior in 2006, the Zeravani expanded significantly. They participated in combat operations against the Islamic State (ISIS) as part of Operation Inherent Resolve and received training from the Italian Carabinieri as well as from Canadian, British, German, and other coalition forces.

=== Defense and Emergency Forces ===
The Defense and Emergency Forces (Kurdish: ھێزەکانی بەرگری و فریاکەوتن, romanized: Hêzekanî Bergirî û Firiyakewtin, DEF) are the PUK-affiliated counterpart to the Zeravani and were likewise formally transferred to the Ministry of Interior in 2006. The two formations together constituted the main armed components of the ministry, and as a combined institution they have been described by researchers as the Kurdistan Region Interior Forces (KRIF).

=== Kurdistan Region Police ===
The General Directorate of Police is the civilian law enforcement arm of the ministry, responsible for routine policing, public order, criminal investigations, and emergency response. It also encompasses a General Directorate of Traffic Police, whose regional headquarters is located in Erbil. Municipal police are responsible for traditional civil and traffic enforcement, environmental policing, immigration enforcement, and facilities protection, with emergency police units handling major criminal cases.

== Departments and directorates ==
The Ministry of Interior encompasses multiple general directorates. These include:

- General Directorate of Police – responsible for civilian policing across the region's governorates.
- General Directorate of Traffic Police – responsible for road traffic regulation and driver licensing.
- General Directorate of Citizenship and Civil Affairs – responsible for passports, civil registration, and residency documentation. Its Directorate of Passport operates offices in Erbil and Sulaymaniyah.
- General Directorate of Combating Violence against Women and Families (DCVAW) – formed in 2007 to receive, investigate, and respond to cases of violence against women. It operates branches in each of the three main governorates, maintains offices in districts across the region, and runs a hotline (119).
- Joint Crisis Coordination Centre (JCC) – established in May 2015, the JCC is responsible for humanitarian affairs and displacement policy, including the administration and coordination of IDP and refugee camps across the Kurdistan Region.

== Ministers ==
Name	Cabinet	Notes
Karim Şingalî	The 4th, 5th, 6th, 7th, and 8th KRG cabinets	From 2001 until 2019
Rebar Ahmed Khalid	9th KRG cabinet	Appointed from July 2019.

== See also ==
- Ministry of Peshmerga Affairs
- Kurdistan Region Security Council
