= Immigration to the Kurdistan Region =

Immigration to the Kurdistan Region, particularly to the territory of the modern Kurdistan Region of Iraq (KRI), has been a significant part of the region's history.

Its attraction for immigration, especially for refugees and internally displaced persons (IDPs), stems from its relative safety compared to the rest of Iraq, and it has therefore been described as a "safe haven" for many. While the KRI has historically been multiethnic, conflicts in the Middle East during the 21st century have accelerated the arrival of immigrants from diverse backgrounds.

In addition, the region has attracted Kurds from other parts of Kurdistan, as well as migrant workers from Southeast Asia, Africa, and Arabs from other parts of Iraq seeking economic opportunities.

== History ==
After the 2003 invasion of Iraq, the subsequent constitutional recognition of the KRI, and the economic boom following years of isolation, the Kurdistan Region experienced its first significant effects of globalization, as migrant workers arrived from Southeast Asia (Indonesia, the Philippines, Bangladesh), Africa (Ethiopia, Somalia), and other parts of Iraq. This trend was further accelerated by billions of dollars in investment from Turkey and the United States, along with the start of oil extraction in the KRI in 2007. Foreign immigrants typically took low-paying jobs or positions that Kurds would not give to Arabs, due to longstanding animosity. The strong economic growth of the Kurdistan Region and its relative political protection from historically anti‑Kurdish governments further attracted large numbers of Kurds from Iran, Turkey, and Syria. A Kurdish newspaper estimated that around 50,000 Kurds from Turkey were living in the Kurdistan Region in 2009.

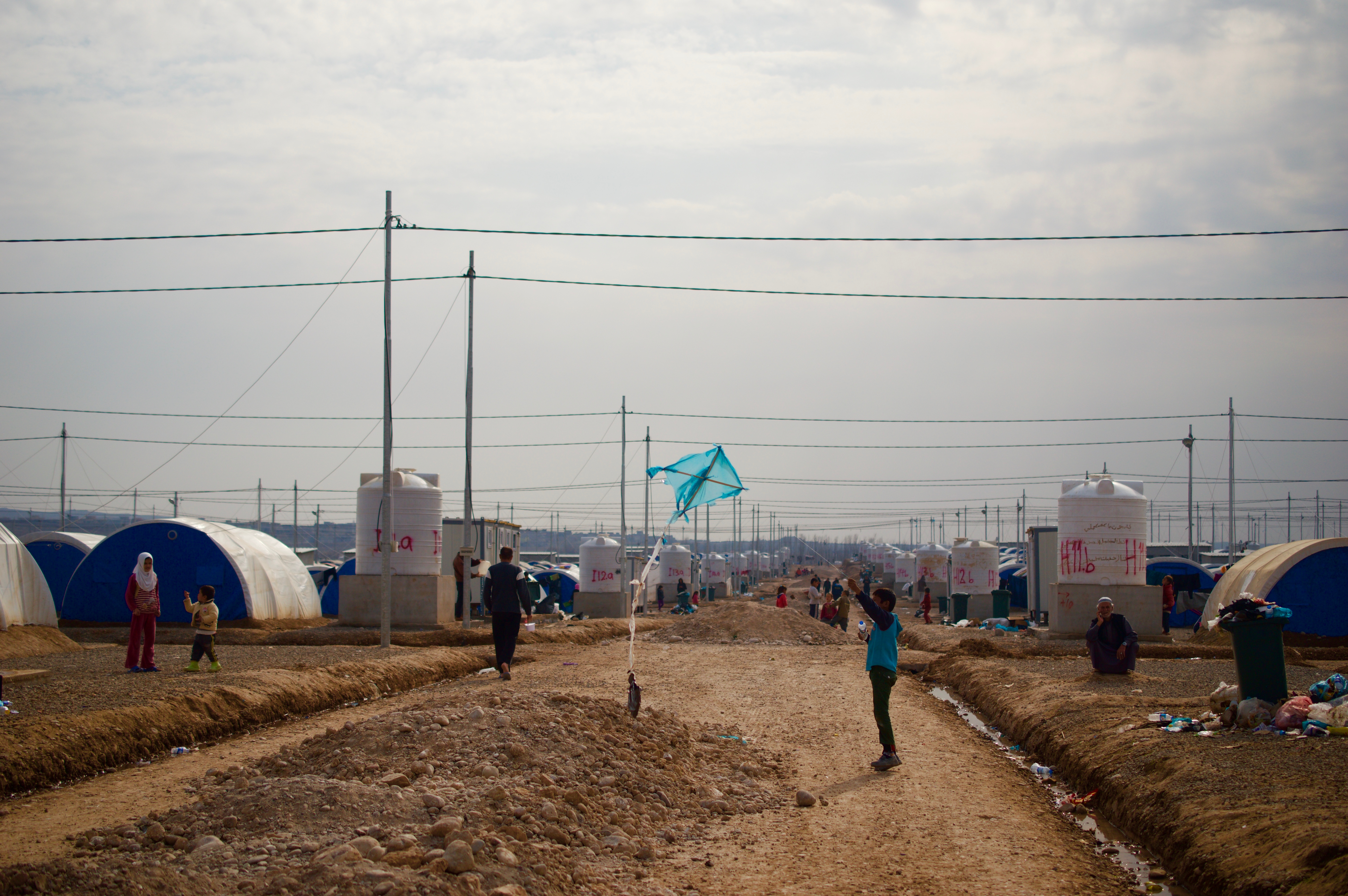
Hassan Sham IDP camp for Arabs, located on the Kurdish-controlled side of the Kurdistan Region–Iraq border between Erbil and Mosul.

When the Islamic State advanced across Iraq and Syria in 2014, the Kurdistan Region received more than 1 million IDPs and approximately 250,000 Syrian refugees fleeing the violence, including religious minorities targeted for genocide. This sudden influx increased the population of the region by around 28% within a few months. Yazidis from Shingal, the largest group, and Arabs from Nineveh fled primarily to Duhok, while Christians, also primarily from Nineveh, including Chaldeans, Assyrians, and Syriacs, have most notably settled in Ankawa, Erbil. Some Turkmen and Arabs from Kirkuk also fled to the KRI.

In October 2021, the Prime Minister of the Kurdistan Region, Masrour Barzani, formally designated Ankawa, a suburb largely settled by Christian immigrants, as a district, granting it greater autonomy in local governance, including the election of officials.

According to a 2021 report by the United States Commission on International Religious Freedom, the Kurdistan Region has continued to host large displaced populations since the war against the Islamic State, with over 900,000 IDPs and refugees still residing in the region.

== Immigration regulations ==
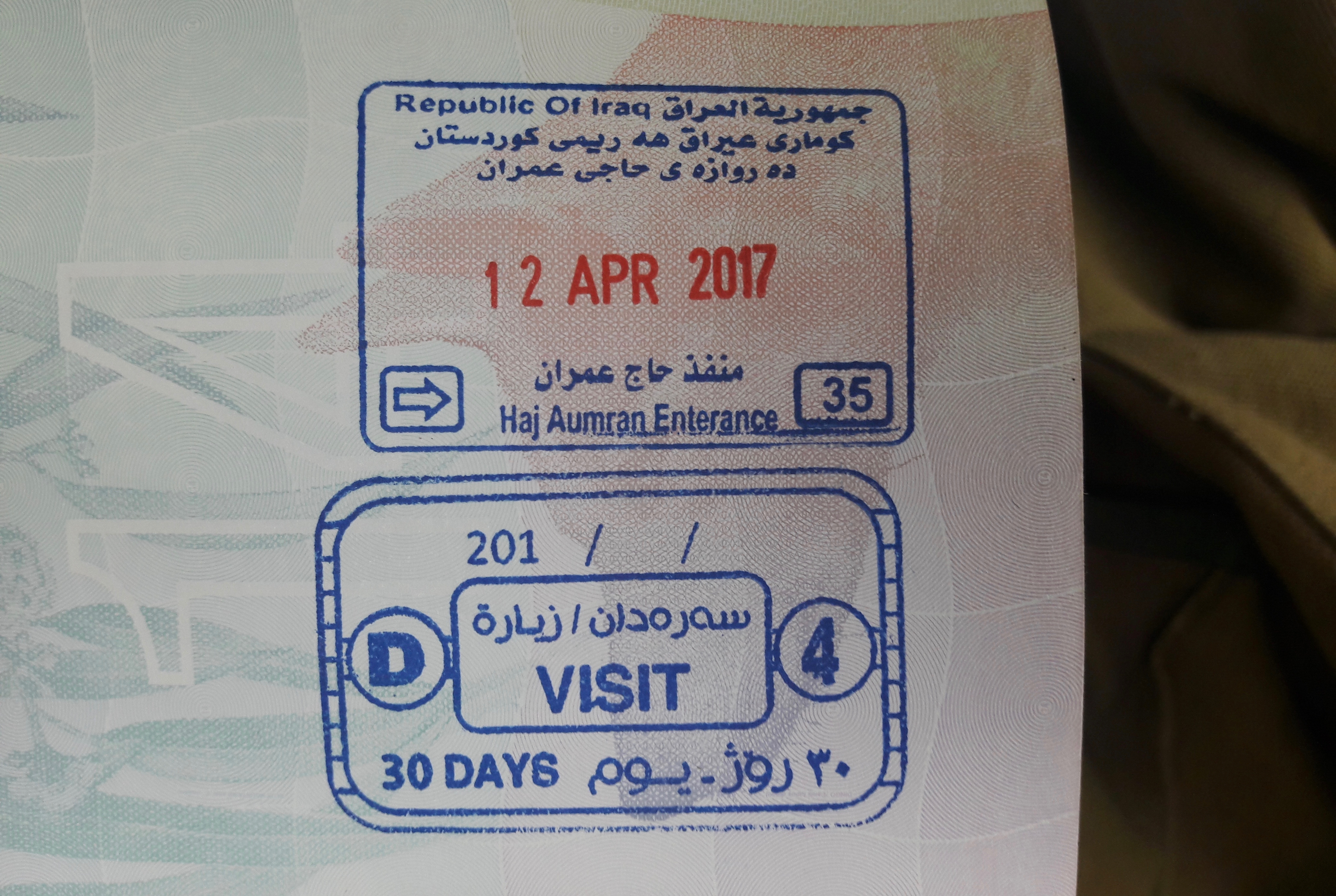
Entry stamp issued at the Haji Omeran border crossing by the Kurdistan Regional Government (KRG), bearing bilingual Arabic and Kurdish text and granting a 30-day visit.

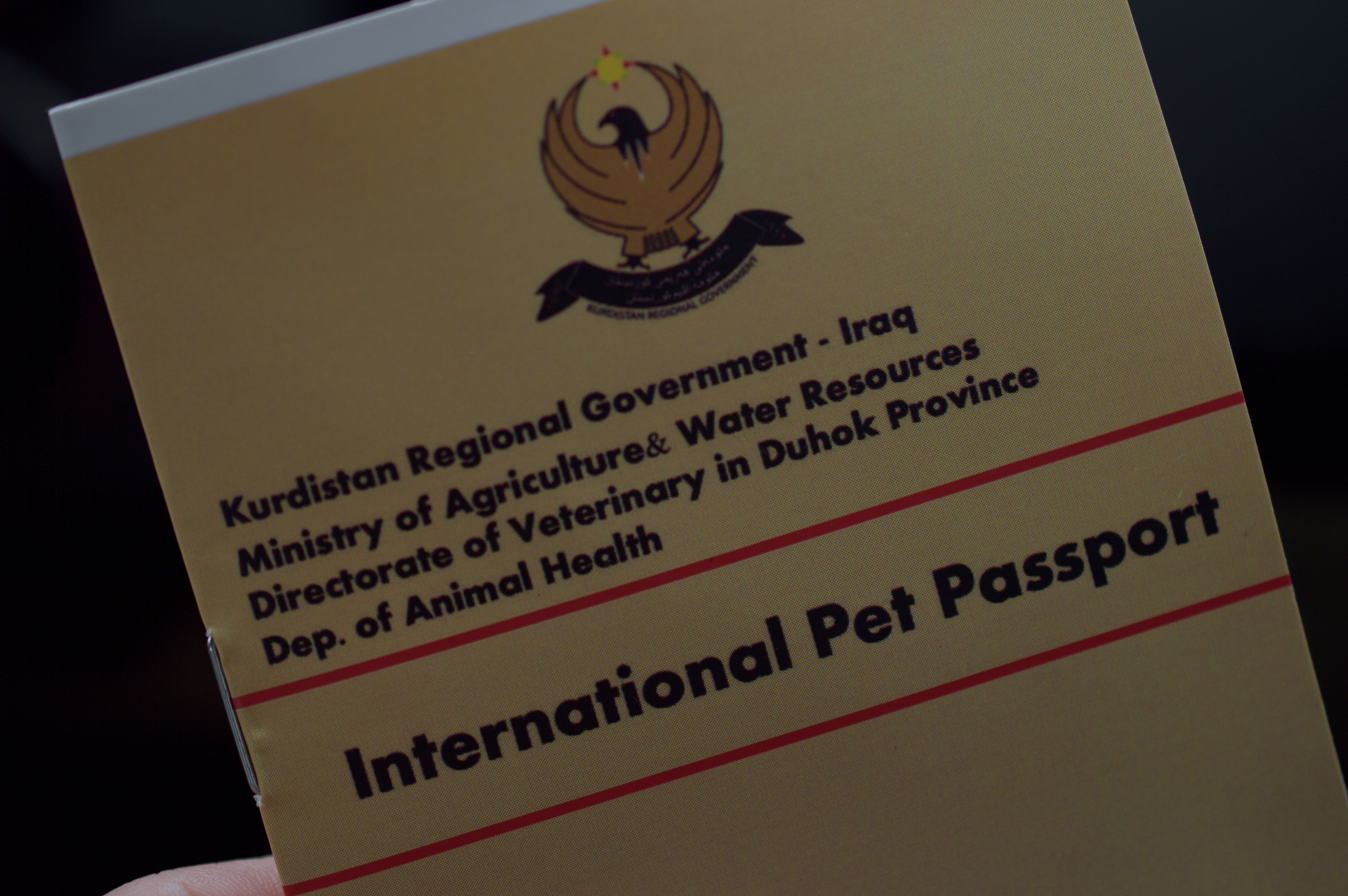
Pet passport issued by the KRG.

The Kurdistan Region has a visa and residency system separate from the rest of Iraq. This system follows an ethno-nationalistic approach to immigration, which has been described as "biopolitics" or a "blood and soil" policy. However, in general, the Kurdistan Regional Government (KRG) upholds the principle of non-refoulement. Separate regulations and procedures apply to Iraqi citizens of different ethnic backgrounds immigrating from federal Iraq, to foreigners, and to Kurds from other parts of Kurdistan who may lack recognized citizenship.

The immigration office, the Asayish, and the Kurdistan Region Police all share responsibility for controlling immigration at borders, checkpoints, and airports.

Temporary permits are generally issued at border crossings for stays of up to 30 days, whereas permanent residence permits for immigrants do not exist in the KRI; instead, residency is granted through annually renewable residency cards.

=== Iraqi citizens from federal Iraq ===
Non-KRI registered Iraqi citizens coming from federal Iraq, especially Arabs, Turkmen, and unmarried individuals, face at times restrictions and harsh treatment when immigrating or crossing to the Kurdistan Region. Regulations vary by KRI governorate and change frequently due to political developments, while Kurds, Yazidis, and, in some governorates, Christians are largely exempt from these restrictions.

For shorter stays, Arab and Turkmen non-KRI Iraqi citizens must cross at one of the checkpoints along the heavily militarized intranational border between federal Iraq and the KRI, where they are singled out by their license plates or dialect. There, they undergo a security check, and if passed, they are issued a "security guarantee" allowing a stay of 30 days. Those entering via airports must visit a local Asayish office within 48 hours to complete the check.

For longer stays of up to one year, which may be renewed, non-KRI Iraqi citizens are required to obtain a residency card, similar to foreigners from other countries.

=== Foreigners ===
Foreigners may enter the Kurdistan Region through official border crossings (e.g.: Ibrahim Khalil, Haji Omeran, Faysh Khabur) with a valid passport and either a visa or KRI residency card. Similar to non-KRI registered Iraqi citizens, shorter stays require a temporary permit obtained at border crossings, while longer stays require a residency card.

=== Residency cards ===
For stays exceeding the 30-day limit of a temporary permit issued at border crossings, a residency card can be requested by non-KRI registered Iraqi citizens and foreigners. Historically, the residency card allowed stays of 3 to 12 months; however, as of 2017, it permits stays of 6 to 12 months. The residency card may be renewed.

To obtain a residency card, applicants must meet the following requirements:

- Support letter from a sponsor in the Kurdistan Region and/or written personal guarantee from an Iraqi citizen in the KRI.
- Evidence of a blood test, which tests for HIV, hepatitis, and other infectious diseases.
- Approval by a local mukhtar (a community head) and Asayish following an interview at the local headquarters, covering the applicant's political orientation, occupation, and family ties.
- Citizens of certain countries require approval from the KRG Ministry of Labor and Social Affairs.

Employers, universities, schools or any offices of government can act as sponsors.

Holders of a residency card can apply to bring their family members to the Kurdistan Region. They may be able to apply for a job, enroll their children in public schools and have access to public healthcare services. The residency card is recognized only within the Kurdistan Region. The residency card may be retained for short-term travel outside the KRI. However, upon permanently leaving the KRI, it must be returned to the Residency Office or at the airport or border crossing.

A Kurdish individual born abroad to a family from the Kurdistan Region, does not require a residency card.
