= Gulan Forces =

- Hezê Gulan
- Active: 2014–present
- Country: Iraq
- Allegiance: Kurdistan Regional Government; KDP
- Branch: Peshmerga
- Type: Special operations
- Role: Dignitary protection
- Size: 6,000 (2016)
- Garrison/HQ: Pirmam, Erbil
- Colors: Red & Golden yellow

Commanders
- Current Commander: Mansour Barzani

The Gulan Forces or Forces of Gulan (Kurdish: Hezê Gulan or Hezekanî Gulan) are an elite unit of the Peshmerga, the military forces of the Kurdistan Region. The unit is affiliated with the Kurdistan Democratic Party (KDP) and being commanded by Mansour Barzani, the son of Masoud Barzani. In peacetime the unit is tasked with defending the KRG President and the presidential compound.

== Name ==
The unit is named after the Gulan Revolution of May 1976, which marked a renewal of organized Kurdish resistance against the Ba’athist regime.

== History ==
The Gulan Forces fought on the Mosul front during the War against the Islamic State. The unit was commanded by Mansour Barzani while his son Yasser Barzani was part of the unit too. In late 2014, the unit liberated the city of Rabia together with the Duhok Anti-Terror Units from ISIS. In August 2016, the unit liberated many Kaka'i and Shabaki areas in the Nineveh Plains from ISIS' control. From August 16 to August 18 2016, Mansour led an offensive that freed several more villages from ISIS. During the offensive, he instructed his forces to prevent the militants from fleeing. Gulan Forces managed to kill 130 ISIS terrorists during the battles.

In 2017, during the Kirkuk crisis, Mansour's Gulan Forces claimed to have destroyed an Iraqi M1 Abrams tank near Zummar.

In January 2024, VOA reported of a drone attack on the unit's base near Pirmam, Erbil. The attack was linked to Iran-backed Shiite militants.

== Strength ==
In 2016, the unit numbered 6,000 specially trained Peshmerga soldiers and around 200 military vehicles.

== Criticism ==
Pro-PKK media outlets, such as ANF News, alleged that the Turkish Armed Forces were deploying members of the Gulan Forces against PKK fighters in Metîna, Garê and the Qandil Mountains in the Kurdistan Region. They also allege that the force had received "special training" by the Turkish private military contractor SADAT.

== See also ==
- Counter Terrorism Department (CTD) – intelligence agency that is part of the Kurdistan Region Security Council
