= Erbil Asayish Directorate =

Erbil Asayish Directorate, Kurdistan Regional Government

- بەڕێوەبەرایەتی ئاسایشی هەولێر مديرية أسايش أربيل
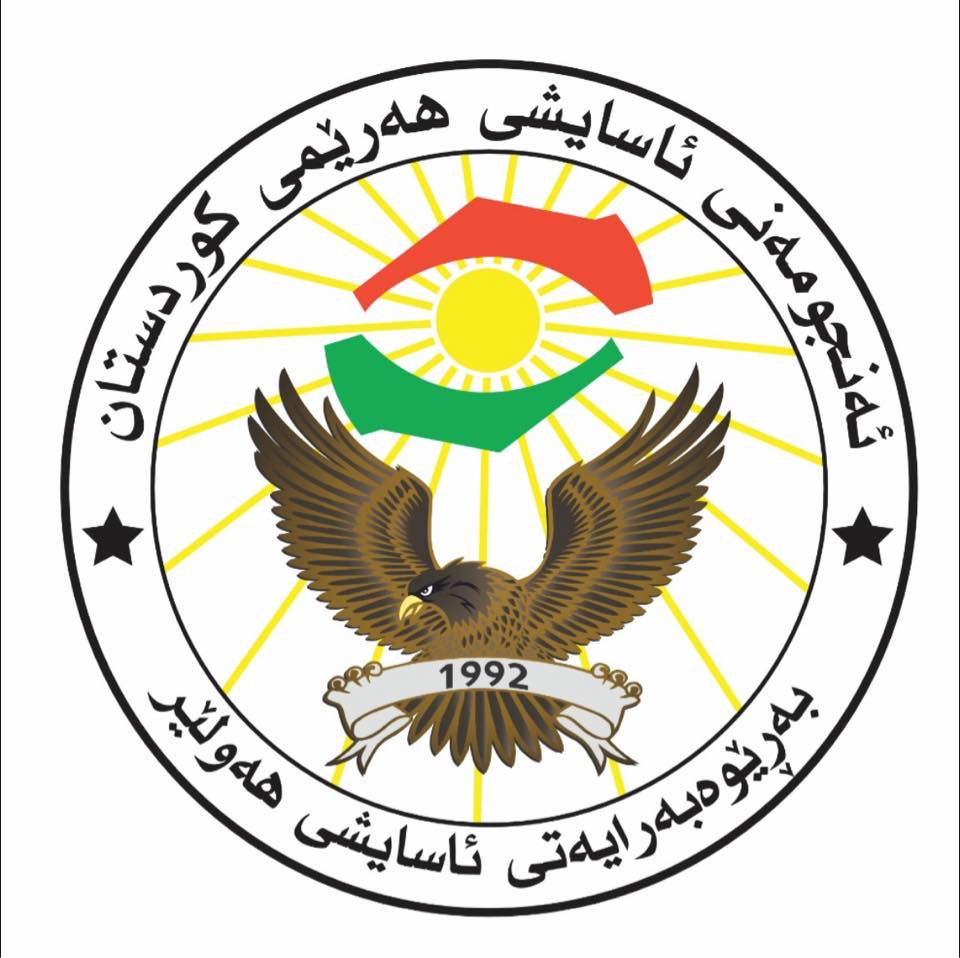

Governmental organization overview
- Formed: 1992; 34 years ago
- Type: Governmental agency
- Jurisdiction: Kurdistan Region, Iraq
- Headquarters: Erbil, Kurdistan Region, Iraq
- Parent department: Kurdistan Region Presidency

The Erbil Asayish Directorate (Kurdish: بەڕێوەبەرایەتی ئاسایشی هەولێر / Arabic: مديرية أسايش أربيل) is an official national institution affiliated with the Kurdistan Region Security Council of Iraq. It was established in 1992 following the Kurdish uprising and the formation of the Kurdistan Regional Government. Its responsibilities include maintaining stability and national security, and ensuring the safety and secuirity of citizens and residents in Erbil, the capital of the Kurdistan Region.

The word "Asayish" means "security", and the directorate is headed by Barzan Qassab.

== Main Duties ==
- Protecting public security Monitoring and neutralizing any attempt to disturb the peace of Erbil.
- Combating terrorism.
- Combating cybercrime.

== See also ==
- Kurdistan Regional Government Website
- Erbil Asayish Directorate Website
- Kurdistan Region Security Council
