= Zeravani =

Kurdistan militarized police force

Pêşmerge Zêrevanî
- زێرەڤانی; Zêrevanî
- Zêrevanî logo
- Active: 1997–2006 (as Kurdish forces); 2006–present (Kurdistan Regional Government)
- Country: Iraq
- Allegiance: Kurdistan Regional Government
- Branch: Peshmerga
- Role: Gendarmerie
- Size: 200,000 active 250,000 reservists
- Garrison/HQ: Zaxo
- Nickname: Zerêvanî
- Engagements: War in Iraq (2013–2017); Syrian Civil War

Commanders
- Commander: Lieutenant General Ezîz Weysî Banî
- Notable commanders: Hana Peshang Miran

The Zerevani (Kurdish: زێرەڤانی, romanized: Zêrevanî, lit. 'Guard or Guardian') or Zeravani, sometimes Zeravani Army are a militarized force (described as a gendarmerie by some) operated by the Kurdistan Regional Government (KRG).

== History ==
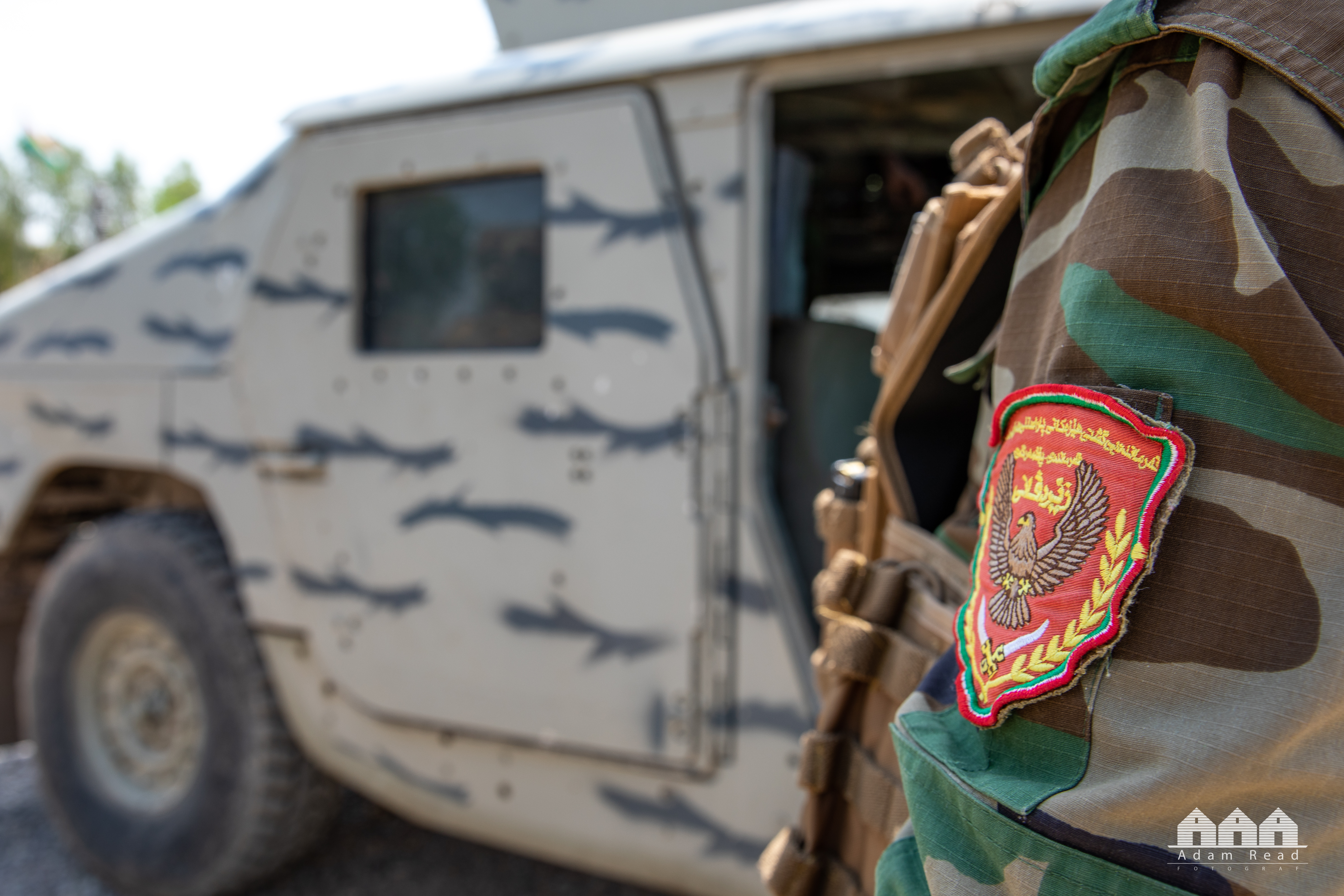
Zêrevanî Commando

The Zerevani were established in 1997 by the Kurdistan Democratic Party (KDP) in order to support the Kurdish police and Asayish forces in providing security for the Kurdistan Region. The Zerevani's role expanded over the years to also ensure security for industrial property, electricity stations and water resources, as well as embassies, consulates, government offices and other sensitive targets. They have also taken responsibility for security at Erbil International Airport.

A Zerevani division led by Colonel Abu Rish fought against the Islamic State (ISIS) near Mosul during the summer of 2015. In 2016 the Zeravani, according to Colonel Abdularrahman Hassan, still occupied frontline positions around Mosul.

== Organisational structure ==
The Zerevani are under the operational control of the KRG's Ministry of Interior but are also sometimes considered to be part of the broader Peshmerga force.

The first Commanding Chief of Zerevani was Faridun Jwanroyi. Jwanroyi resigned in 2010, which followed Aziz Waisi's appointment as the Major General of the Zerevani.

According to Stratfor, in 2004, two Zêrevanî divisions (totaling 30,000 troops) were established in the Iraqi Federal Police. In 2011, the Zerevani strength numbered 47,000 personnel, while in 2017, Zerevani strength numbered 51,000 personnel. Among them are several Christians of Kurdistan Region.

Zerevani accepts recruits aged between 18 and 27. They need to provide an Iraqi national ID, be literate, have a clean record and a recommendation in terms of moral and loyalty issues.

Women are allowed to, and also do, serve.

== Training ==
In November 2009, the Zêrevanî began training alongside the Iraqi Federal Police, in order to conduct effective police work and counter-insurgency operations. Since 2014, the Zeravani have undergone training with the Combined Joint Task Force – Operation Inherent Resolve. For some time, much of the Zerevani training was conducted primarily by the Italian Carabinieri, but also by Canadian, British, German, Dutch, Norwegian, Finnish and Hungarian forces.

== Equipment ==
Because Zêrevanî forces were low on equipment when they began training, the Peshmerga army donated some of their weapons to the Zêrevanî. The Kurdistan Regional Government set them up a base and allowed them to buy their own weapons. The Zeravani are equipped with modern American, Russian and French arms and weapons, unlike the Peshmerga, who often use old Soviet and American weapons from the 1960s.

== Issues ==
In June 2008, the Zêravanî were the subject of an Amnesty International campaign after a Kurdish journalist was allegedly kidnapped. According to Canadian website McLeans.ca, the Zêravanî are considered loyal to the ruling Kurdistan Democratic Party; according to Major General Aziz Waisi, all political activities are forbidden within the Zêravanî, although party membership is allowed.

== See also ==
- Parastin (intelligence service)
- Asayish (security service)
- Peshmerga (armed forces)
