= 2025 Sulaymaniyah clashes =

2025 armed clashes in Sulaymaniyah

Coordinates: 35.5792199°N 45.3821145°E

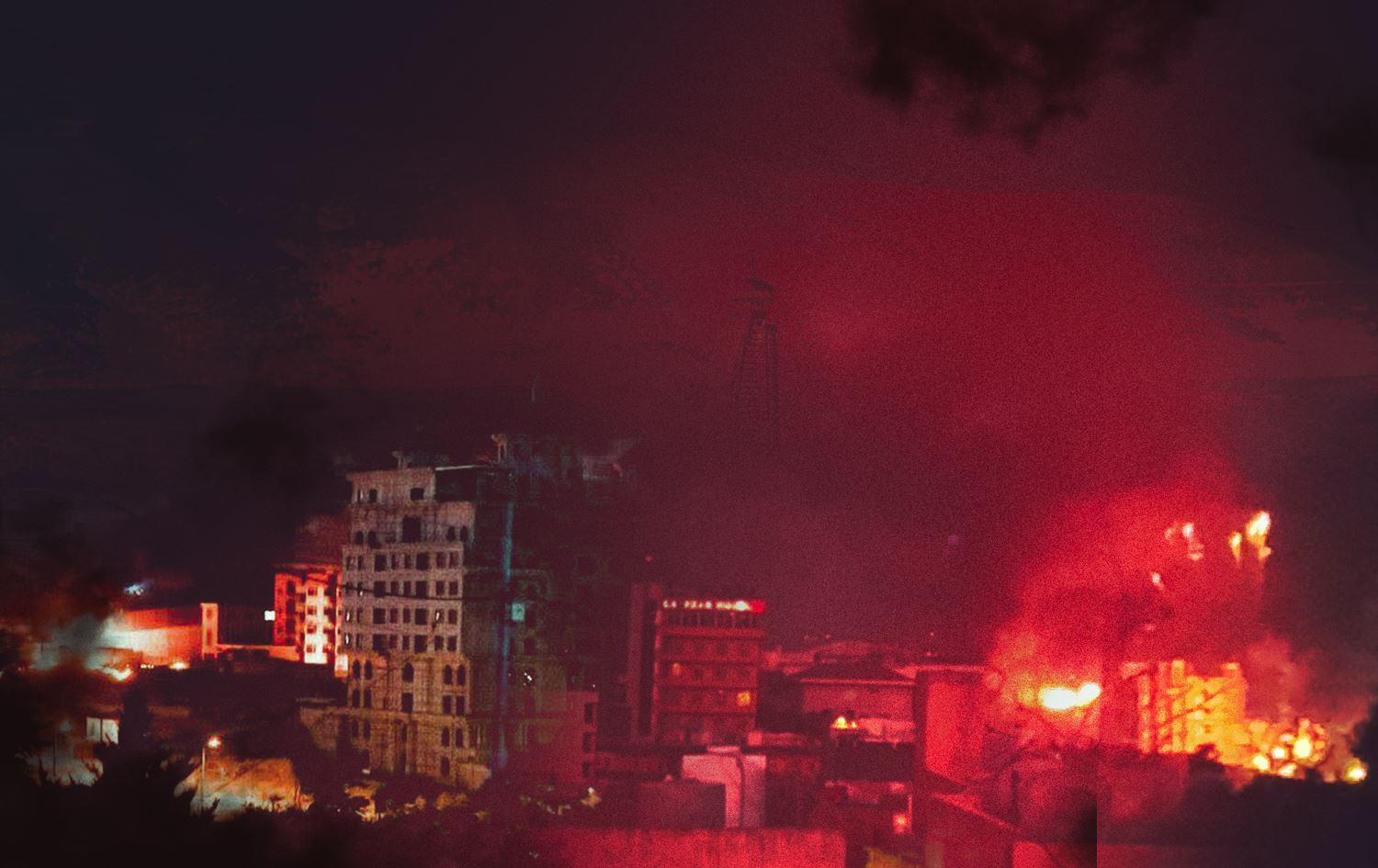
- Sarchnar collision amid the clashes
- Date: 22 August 2025; 03:30 – 08:00
- Location: Lalezar Hotel, Sarchnar, Sulaymaniyah, Kurdistan Region
- Caused by: Claims of conspiracy involving Lahur Talabani, armed supporters of his People's Front, failure to appear in court, (alleged) and internal PUK power struggle
- Result: Arrest of Lahur Sheikh Jangi Talabani and his brother Polad Talabani, and the commander of his force; Several associates detained; Heavy material casualties in the area

Lead figures
Bafel Talabani; Wahab Halabjayi	Lahur Talabani (POW); Polad Talabani (WIA) (POW); Rebwar Hamid (POW)

Units involved
PUK; CTG; Asayish; Special operations; PUK Commandos; Supported by: Iran	Dupishk Forces & Supporters of Lahur Talabani

Number
9 T-55 tanks Several Humvees; 120 UAVs	77 armed fighters

Casualties and losses
3 killed	2 killed (48 arrested) (Note: According to some external sources, the number of fatalities is more than 30)
- 19+ injured Several vehicles, buildings and residential houses were burned and collapsed

The 2025 Sulaymaniyah clashes (Kurdish: ڕووداوەکانی سلێمانی) were armed confrontations that occurred on 22 August 2025 in the city of Sulaymaniyah, Iraqi Kurdistan, following a security raid targeting opposition leader Lahur Sheikh Jangi Talabani. The incident led to the arrest of Lahur Talabani, his brother Polad Talabani, and several of their associates. The clashes drew significant attention and concern across the Middle East.

The arrest of Lahur Talabani comes after the arrest of Shaswar Abdulwahid, the leader of the New Generation Movement, who was also detained in Sulaymaniyah. According to political observers, this series of arrests carried out by Bafel and Qubad Talabani is aimed at consolidating and strengthening the power of the PUK in Sulaymaniyah.

== Background ==
Lahur Talabani, a former co-president of the Patriotic Union of Kurdistan (PUK), was removed from the party's leadership in 2021 after an internal power struggle with his cousin, Bafel Talabani. On 8 July 2021, tensions between the two co-presidents escalated, when the PUK’s Counter-Terrorism Group (CTG), which was under Lahur Talabani's control, was taken over, and he was later formally sidelined from the party's leadership.

He later founded the opposition movement known as the People's Front. His faction maintained significant influence in Sulaymaniyah, often directly competing with Bafel Talabani's leadership within the PUK.

In the months leading up to August 2025, tensions between Lahur Talabani's loyalists and the authorities increased, involving disputes over political influence, armed units, and control of security institutions.

Sulaimaniyah court spokesman, judge Salah Hassan, said an arrest warrant was issued on 21 August 2025 for Lahur Talabani and several others "for conspiracy aimed at destabilising security and stability".

== Events ==
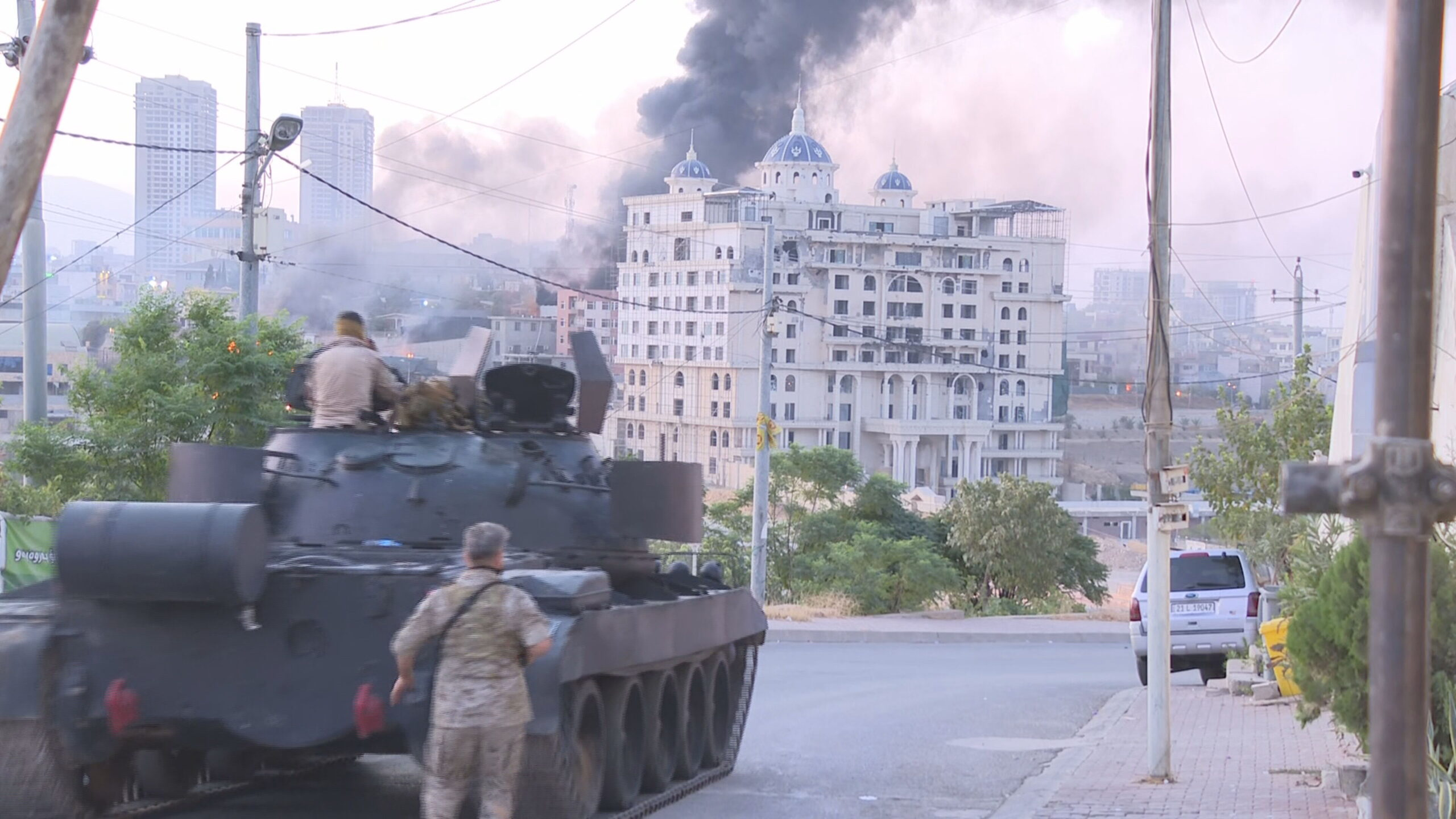
Tanks during the ongoing battle (22 August 2025)

In the early hours of 22 August 2025 (directly, 00:00 to 01:00), security forces launched a raid on the Lalezar Hotel (Note: Kurdish: لالەزار) in Sarchnar, Sulaymaniyah, where Lahur Talabani was staying. The operation was carried out under an arrest warrant issued by Sulaymaniyah court.

Lahur Talabani refused to surrender to the authorities, leading to heavy clashes between security units and armed loyalists of Lahur Talabani in 03:30. Prior to the clashes, power in parts of Sulaymaniyah was turned off. Fighting lasted for several hours and spread to surrounding streets in central Sulaymaniyah. Gunfire and explosions were reported during the confrontation, which caused panic among residents.

During and prior to the clashes, all entrances to Sulaymaniyah and its districts were closed by military and security forces.

Additionally, on the morning of 22 August, two drones were reported near the residence of PUK leader Bafel Talabani, Dabashan, (Note: Kurdish: دەباشان) resulting in visible smoke.

Following the fighting, security forces arrested Lahur Talabani and his brother Polad Talabani. Several of their aides and associates also surrendered or were detained. The detainees were transferred to undisclosed facilities for interrogation.

== Casualties ==
According to official statements, at least five people were killed in the clashes: three members of the security forces and two members of the Dupishk Forces. More than 18 others were injured, including both fighters and bystanders. The violence represented one of the most serious outbreaks of armed confrontation in Sulaymaniyah in recent years.

Later the same day, security checkpoints were set up across Sulaymaniyah, and patrols increased to prevent further unrest. By the afternoon, the city began returning to relative calm.

The deputy governor of Sulaymaniyah said the damaged areas will be restored and people compensated.

== Reactions ==
- UN: The United Nations Assistance Mission for Iraq (UNAMI) expressed concern over the clashes, stating that it "regrets the loss of life and injuries resulting from the recent clashes." UNAMI also called on all parties to "exercise restraint, refrain from any actions that could endanger the lives of civilians, respect human rights, and ensure a fair and impartial judicial process in line with the provisions of the Constitution".
- Kurdistan Region: Masrour Barzani, the Prime Minister of Kurdistan Region, called for restraint from both sides involved in the clashes and emphasized the need to maintain security in Sulaymaniyah. He stated that the confrontations in Sulaymaniyah undermine the stability and safety of the Kurdistan Region.
- United Kingdom: The British consulate in Erbil expressed concern over the loss of life during the clashes. It urged the relevant authorities to ensure that due process is followed, including adherence to principles of transparent and fair justice.
- United States: The spokesperson for the U.S. embassy in Baghdad stated that the United States is closely monitoring the situation in Sulaymaniyah. The embassy condemned any violence that could threaten public safety or regional stability.
- Turkey: The spokesperson for the Ministry of Foreign Affairs, Öncü Keçeli, issued a statement saying that, "For the stability and security of Iraq and the protection of our citizens, we are closely monitoring developments in Sulaymaniyah." The statement also noted that the Turkish consulate in Erbil has coordinated with relevant local authorities and taken the necessary measures to ensure the safety of Turkish citizens.
- Iraq: The Presidency of Iraq, stated in a declaration that it is 'closely following with concern the events that took place in the city of Sulaymaniyah, which led to the killing of members of the city's security forces and the injury of others'. Prime Minister Mohammed Shia' Al Sudani deployed a special investigative committee to Sulaymaniyah to examine the events at the Lalezar Hotel.
