= Kurdistan Commando Forces =

- هێزەکانی کۆماندۆی کوردستان romanized: Hêzekanî Komandoî Kurdistan
- Active: ~ 2012–present
- Country: Iraq
- Allegiance: Kurdistan Regional Government; PUK
- Branch: Peshmerga
- Type: Special Forces
- Role: Commando, Special Operations
- Size: 500–10,000
- Garrison/HQ: Dabashan, Sulaymaniyah

Commanders
- Current commander: Diyar Omar (2025)
- Notable commanders: Akam Omar (co-founder), Barham Sheikh Mohammed (Golden Force)

The Kurdistan Commando Forces (Kurdish: هێزەکانی کۆماندۆی کوردستان, romanized: Hêzekanî Komandoî Kurdistan, KCF or CDO) or PUK Commandos is a special forces unit of the Peshmerga, the military forces of the Kurdistan Region. The unit operates specifically within the 70 Unit of the Patriotic Union of Kurdistan's (PUK) Peshmerga and receives orders directly from Bafel Talabani, the president of the PUK.

== History ==
The Kurdistan Commando Forces were formed by Jaafar Mustafa, during his tenure as Minister of Peshmerga Affairs. Akam Omar was one of the co-founders and first commander of the unit.

The forces played a major role during the War against the Islamic State and received training from the U.S.-led coalition forces, particularly France and Germany.

The Commandos conduct regular anti-ISIS operations against sleeper cells near and inside the Saladin Governorate, Diyala Governorate, Kirkuk Governorate and in the areas of Garmian, Kifri and Tuz Khurmato. Sometimes the force also cooperates with the Iraqi Counter Terrorism Service in joint anti-ISIS operations in the disputed regions.

In 2022, Commando units were deployed to the Khor Mor gas fields.

In 2025, the Commandos took part in the controversial arrest of Lahur Talabani and raided his news outlet, Zoom News.

== Structure ==
According to KURDFILE, an anti-establishment and anti-corruption news outlet, the Commando forces comprised 500 fighters organized within three regiments. However, following the power struggle inside the PUK and ousting of Lahur Talabani, recruitment efforts intensified, and the number of commandos surpassed 10,000 as of 2024.

The Commandos are a well-equipped and trained force, which has advanced weapons including armored vehicles, tanks and non-combat helicopters.

The Commandos consist of four to six battalions. The first battalion is the oldest and is known as the Headquarters Battalion, the second battalion is known as the Golden Force, and the third is called the Cobra Battalion.

=== Golden Force ===
The Golden Force or Golden Division Force is a sub-unit of the Kurdistan Commando Forces. It was too created by Jaafar Mustafa and its current commander is his relative Barham Sheikh Mohammed. In 2021, Bafel Talabani tried to replace Sheikh Barham, which was directly rejected by the unit. A statement of the force read:"No one but Sheikh Barham can command the Golden Force."

The unit is prominently equipped with German G-36 assault rifles.

== Criticism ==
The Commando forces have been described as "instrument to serve the interests of their [...] party (PUK)." Kurdistan24 accused the force of having committed "a series of crimes" in Sulaymaniyah including killings, kidnappings, injuries, and the closure of an educational institution.

The Golden Force faced criticism for allegedly misusing its power during a 2021 shootout with Asayish security forces in Sulaimaniyah. Commander Sheikh Barham refuted the allegations.
