= Territory of the Kurdistan Region =

Semi-autonomous federal region of the Republic of Iraq

The Kurdistan Region's (KRI) territorial extent in Iraq is sparsely documented and has shifted over the decades, reflecting changes in territorial agreements, de facto control, de jure control, and constitutional recognition. Under the Constitution of Iraq (2005), the Kurdistan Region exercises authority in the areas east of the Green Line; however, its control has at times extended beyond this boundary into disputed territories of the wider geocultural region of Iraqi Kurdistan. In 2022, the Kurdistan Regional Government (KRG) stated that it administered approximately 46,862 km^{2} (18,094 sq mi) of territory, an area roughly twice the size of the U.S. state of Vermont.

== Core territory (1970) ==
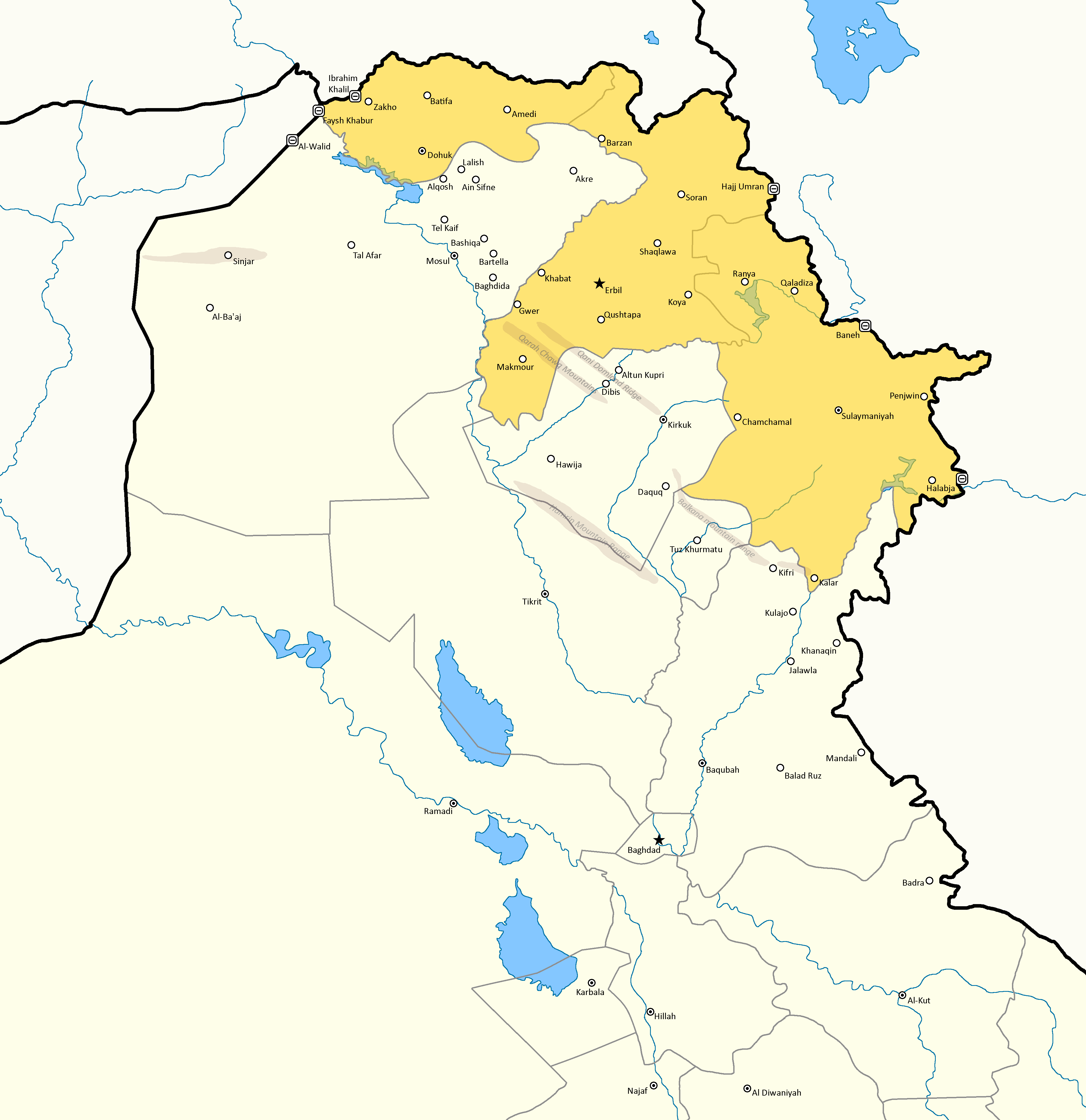
Proposed territory in the 1970 Autonomy Agreement in yellow.

Under the Iraqi–Kurdish Autonomy Agreement of 1970, the governorates of Erbil, Sulaymaniyah, and Duhok were recognized as majority-Kurdish, and it was planned to establish an autonomous Kurdish region in these areas. As a result, these three governorates are typically considered the core of the Kurdistan Region today. The agreement also called for a census to be conducted in other governorates, with the possibility of incorporating them into the autonomous Kurdish region.

However, the autonomy agreement was never fully implemented, and subsequent political and military developments over the following decades altered the territories effectively governed by Kurdish authorities.

== Green Line (1991) ==
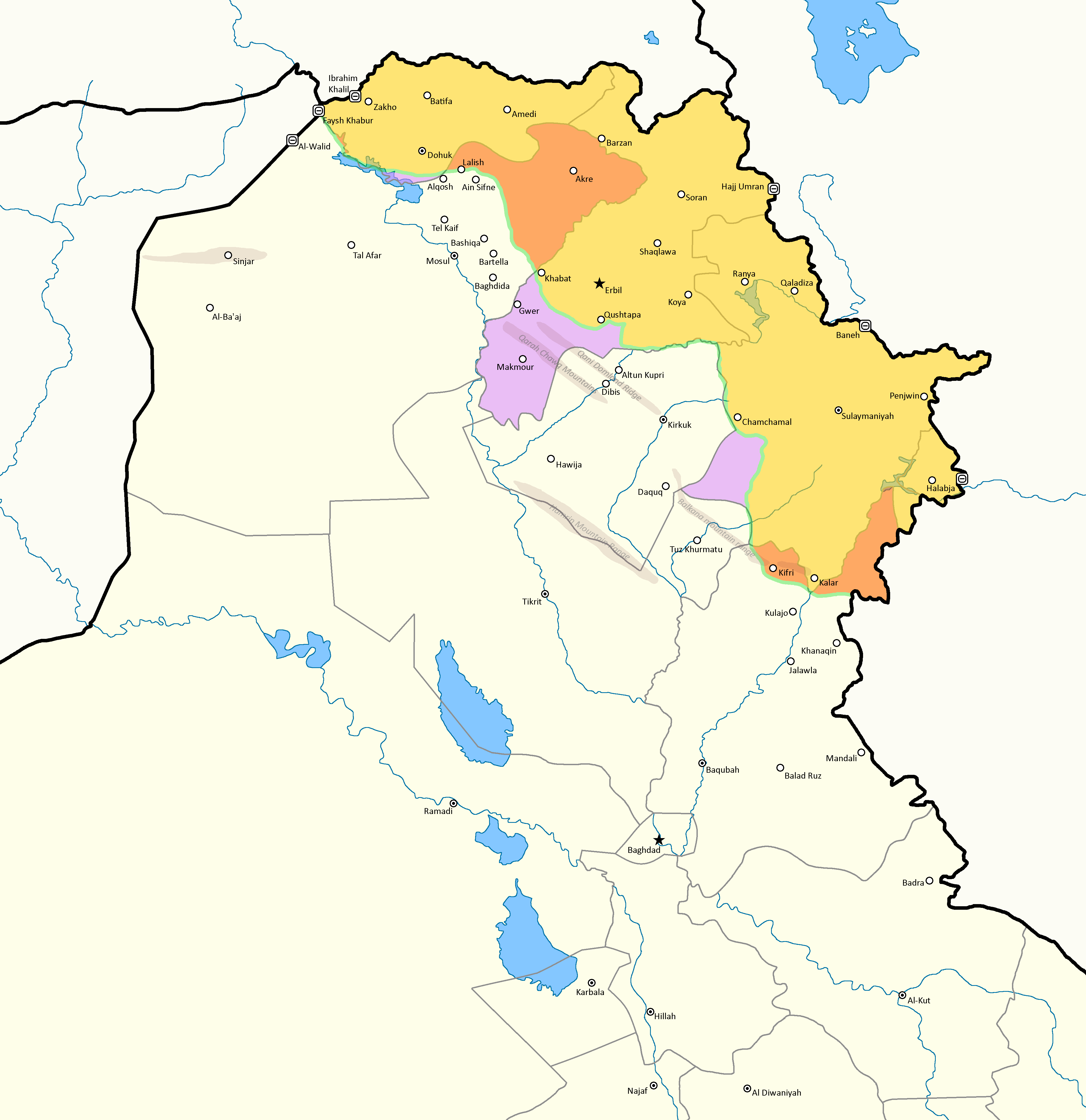
Constitutionally recognized Kurdistan Region shown in yellow and orange, comprising areas east of the "Green Line." Purple represents Iraqi control over areas recognized as part of the Kurdistan Region under the 1970 agreement.

Following the 1991 uprising, Kurdish forces expelled the Iraqi Army from many Kurdish-majority areas. After retreating, the Iraqi Army unilaterally established an ad hoc political boundary known as the Green Line. This line separated Iraqi-controlled territory to the west from Kurdish-controlled territory to the east, encompassing most of the current governorates of Duhok and Sulaymaniyah, all of Halabja, roughly two-thirds of Erbil except for Makhmur District, the northern tip of Diyala Governorate including Kifri, and northeastern parts of Nineveh Governorate including Akre and Lalish, but almost none of Kirkuk governorate. These territories were governed by the Kurdistan Regional Government, which functioned as de facto state in these areas, and the situation remained relatively stable until the 2003 invasion of Iraq.

Following the 2003 invasion, Article 53.A of Iraq's 2004 Transitional Administrative Law recognized "the territories that were administered by that government [the Kurdistan Regional Government, or KRG] on 19 March 2003 (one day before the invasion) in the governorates of Duhok, Erbil, Sulaymaniyah, Kirkuk, Diyala Governorate, and Nineveh Governorate" as the boundary of the Kurdistan Region, corresponding to the Kurdish-administered areas east of the Green Line. This provision was later incorporated into Article 143 of the 2005 permanent Iraqi Constitution, establishing the Green Line as the official and constitutional boundary between the Kurdistan Region and the rest of federal Iraq, which remains in effect today. However, no authoritative rendering of the Green Line exists.

== Trigger Line (2003) ==
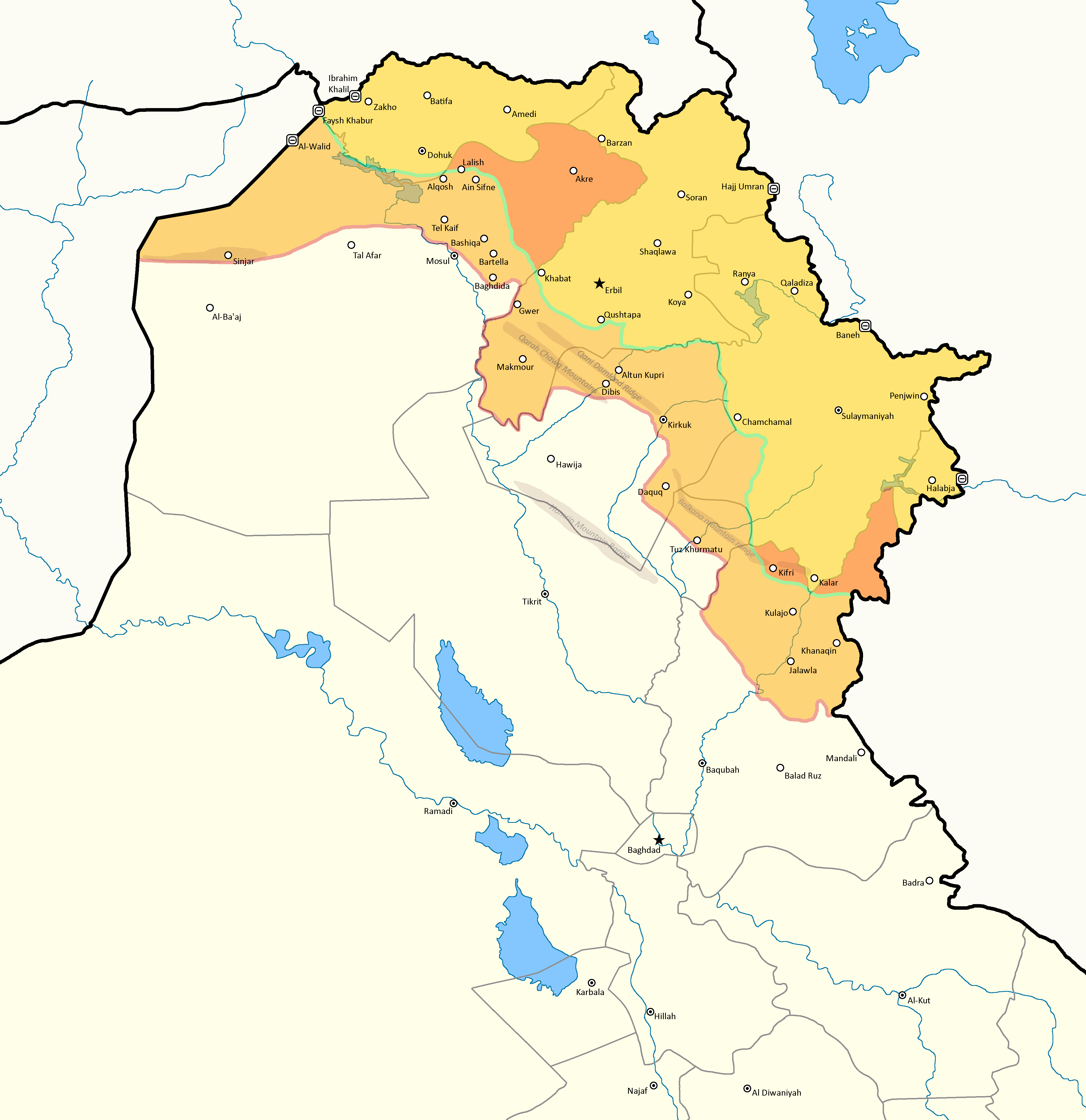
Maximum extent of the Kurdistan Region following the 2003 invasion of Iraq. Kurdish-controlled areas west of the "Green Line" are shown in light orange, while the red line represents the "Trigger Line."

On 20 March 2003, following the US-led invasion of Iraq, Kurdish forces, primarily the Peshmerga, advanced across the Green Line, at times with support from US special forces and air operations, and established control over areas they considered Kurdish or historically linked to Kurdish populations, including Kirkuk, Sinjar, Tuz Khurmatu, Khanaqin, Jalawla, Daquq, Makhmour, Bartella, and Bashiqa, among other areas. In these territories west of the Green Line, Kurdish forces established a new boundary, known as the Trigger Line.

Kurdish control of the areas east of the Trigger Line, which were still officially administered by the Iraqi government, remained firm until 2008 as the Iraqi Army was disbanded and Iraqi state institutions deteriorated. The Peshmerga and Asayish provided security, while KRG administrative structures gradually offered public services and controversially, from 2007 onward, the KRG began awarding contracts to international oil companies for exploration blocks that appeared to extend beyond the Green Line.

== Disputed territories (2005–present) ==
Territorial extent from 2008–present

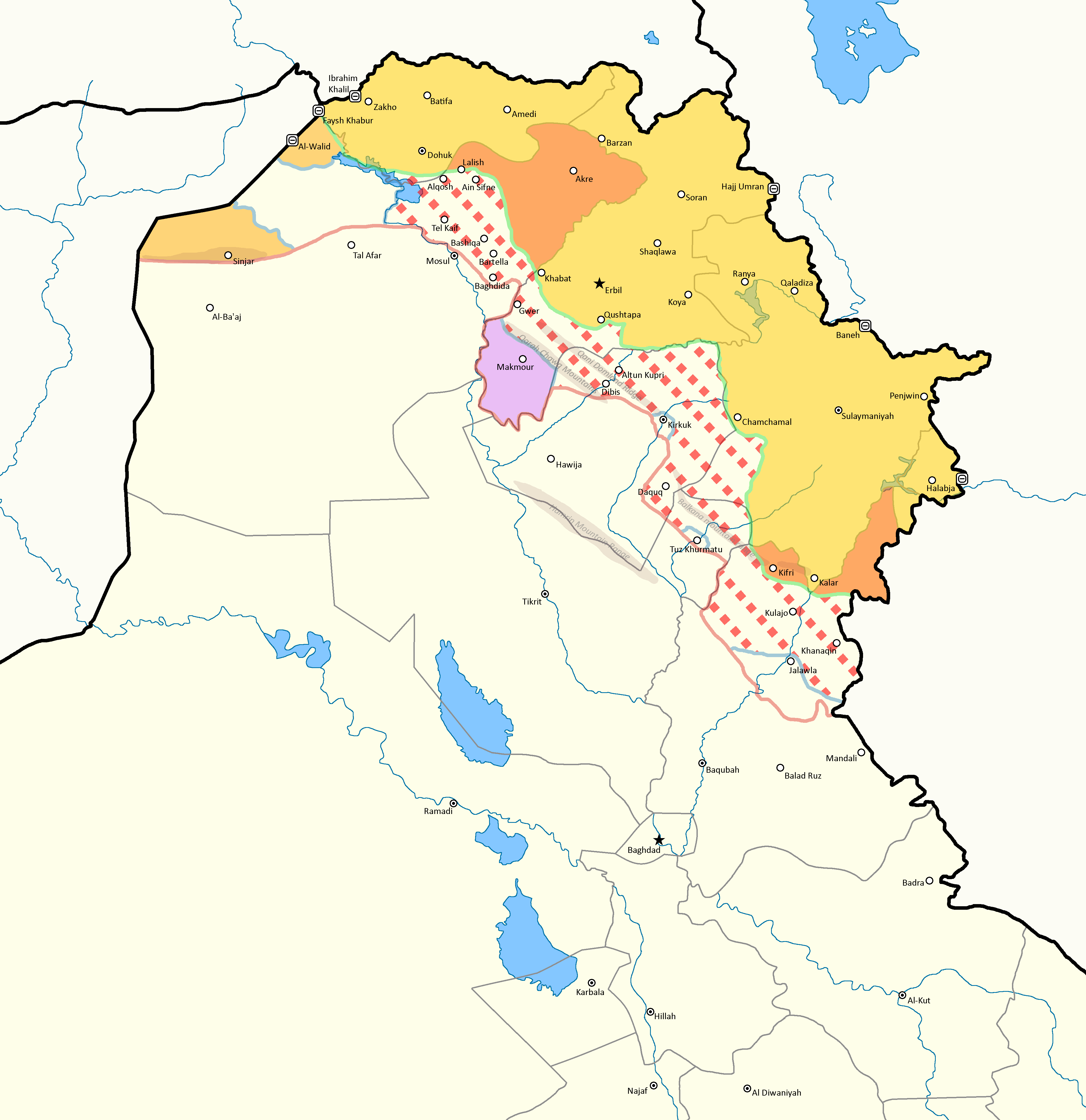
2008–2014
Red dotted areas had changing, disputed or joint control between Kurdish, Iraqi, and US forces.

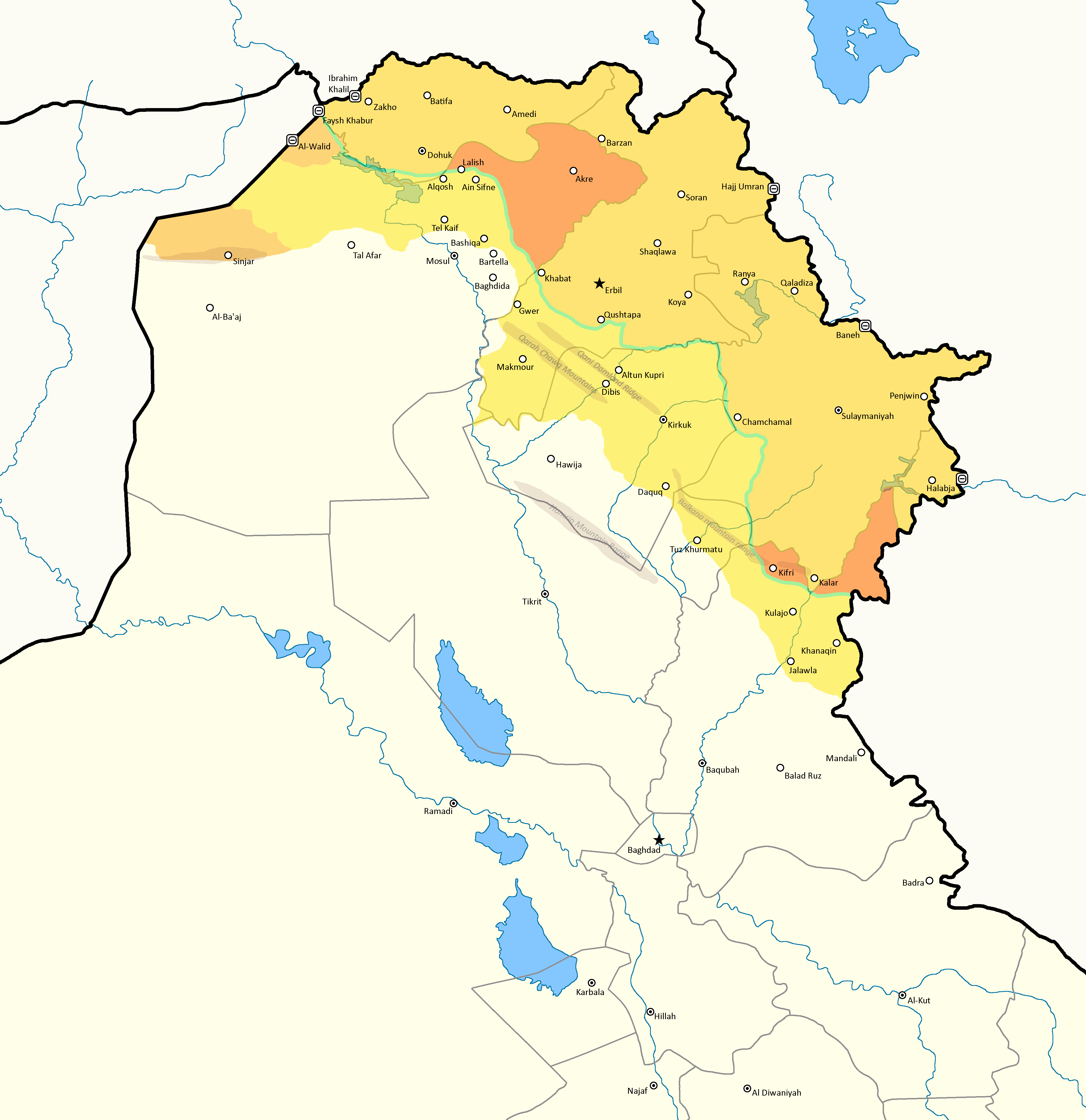
2014–2017
Kurdish control over disputed territories, west of the "Green Line" in light yellow and light orange.

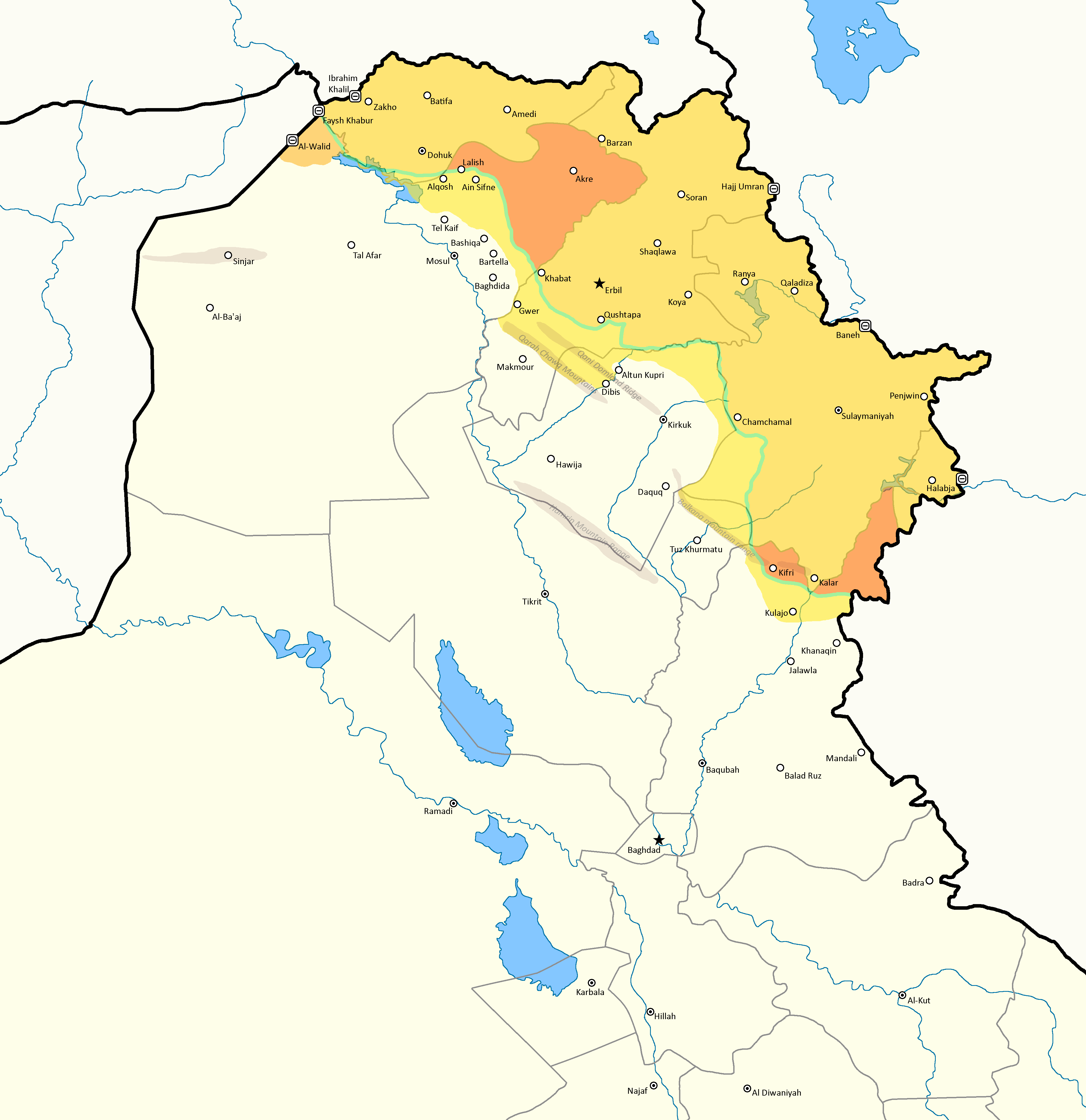
2017–present

Article 140 of the Constitution of Iraq further addresses areas outside the Green Line, defining them as disputed territories that were subject to Arabization policies under previous regimes. It provides a mechanism for their potential incorporation into the Kurdistan Region through a process of "normalization", a census, and a referendum. The deadline for the implementation of this process was 31 December 2007.

The deadline expired without implementation. Following the expiration of the deadline and the reorganization of the Iraqi Army, Prime Minister Nouri al-Maliki initiated efforts in August 2008 to replace Peshmerga forces in the areas between the Green Line and the Trigger Line with Iraqi security forces and assume responsibility for security. This process continued until 2014 and periodically resulted in heightened tensions, standoffs, and even sproadic clashes. A key flashpoint was Kirkuk, where units of the Iraqi Army's 12th Division entered the city in late 2008, alongside the deployment of a US Army brigade. Further, Kurdish forces also withdrew from the ethnically mixed towns such as Jalawla and Qara Tapa, but refused to withdraw from Khanaqin. In other areas, joint patrols by Peshmerga and Iraqi Army units were conducted with mediation by US officers on the ground, while federal police were deployed and, in some cases, US forces were directly deployed to ease tensions.

Following the 2014 Islamic State offensive in Iraq, and the subsequent collapse and retreat of the Iraqi Army toward the predominantly Shia-majority southeast of the country, Peshmerga forces advanced beyond the Green Line and re-established control over much of the disputed territories they had previously withdrawn from, including Kirkuk. Kurdish forces defended these areas against the Islamic State in the following years and, after its defeat, held an independence referendum, including in the disputed territories under their control. The Iraqi government rejected the referendum, and subsequent military operations were launched to reassert federal authority over the disputed territories, leading to the 2017 Iraqi–Kurdish conflict. As a result, Kurdish forces withdrew back to the Green Line, and the Kurdistan Region lost control over most disputed territories it had held, including Kirkuk, Sinjar, and Khanaqin.

== See also ==
- Disputed territories of northern Iraq
- Islamic Emirate of Kurdistan
