= Counter Terrorism Department (Kurdistan Region) =

- Sorani Kurdish: دژه‌ تیرۆری كوردستان romanized: Dijê Tirorî Kurdistan
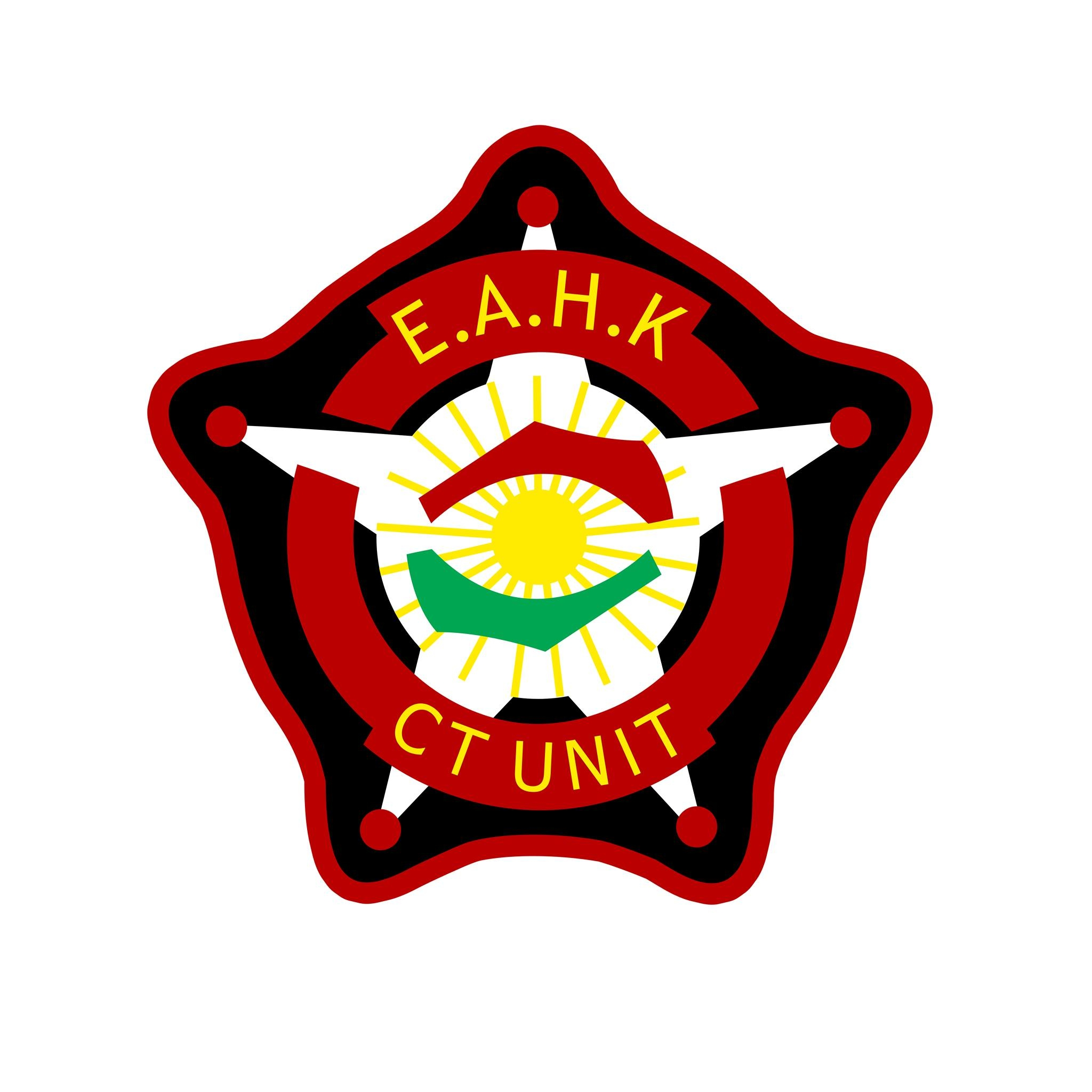
- Active: 2007–present
- Country: Iraq
- Allegiance: Kurdistan Regional Government
- Branch: Peshmerga
- Type: Intelligence
- Role: Counterterrorism
- Part of: Kurdistan Region Security Council
- Headquarters: Erbil, Kurdistan Region, Iraq
- Nicknames: CT Unit, CT Kurdistan

The Counter Terrorism Department (Kurdish: دژه‌ تیرۆری كوردستان, romanized: Dijê Tirorî Kurdistan, CTD) or Counter Terrorism Unit (CT Unit) is a Peshmerga investigative agency within the Kurdistan Region Security Council (KRSC) responsible for analyzing and combating domestic and international terrorism. It shares its intelligence with KRSC members, in particular the Chancellor, to support counter-terrorism efforts and "protect the interests of the Kurdistan Region."

Although the CTD is aligned with the Kurdistan Democratic Party (KDP), it frequently conducts joint operations with the Counter-Terrorism Group Kurdistan, affiliated with the Patriotic Union of Kurdistan (PUK), as well as with the Iraqi Counter-Terrorism Service across the Kurdistan Region and Iraq.

The CTD has also been described as a military "division" of the KRSC.

== History ==
The CTD was established in 2007, and has been a leading partner to the U.S.-led Coalition in targeting members of the ISIL leadership in Iraq and beyond since 2014.

=== 2015 Hawija operation ===
On 22 October 2015, 48 members of the CTD conducted a rescue operation in Hawija backed by 30 US Delta Force operators. The joint U.S.-CTD force freed 69 hostages, killed more than 20 ISIL terrorists and captured 6 others, two of which were considered 'leaders', in a two hour long encounter. During the course of the operation, a US service member, Master Sgt. Joshua L. Wheeler, was killed. The KRSC says its intelligence indicated that the hostages, including Peshmerga officers, were to be executed the following morning as mass graves were being prepared nearby. It announced that there were no Kurds or Peshmerga among the rescued hostages but more than 20 were former members of the Iraqi security force. The US Secretary of Defense at the time, Ash Carter, called the raid 'life-saving' and expected more similar raids with Kurdish partners following the success. Carter added that Kurdish forces collected valuable intelligence, including documents and electronics. The KRSC considered the Hawija operation to be the "single most significant joint rescue operation based out of the Kurdistan region conducted deep in ISIS territory" to date.

=== Rescue of Marlin Stivani Nivarlain ===
On 17 February 2016, Kurdish authorities announced that the CTD rescued a young Swedish girl from ISIL captivity. Marlin Stivani Nivarlain, 16 from Borås, was believed to have been misled by an ISIL member to travel to Syria and later to Mosul to join the group. The KRSC said it was called upon by Swedish authorities and members of Nivarlain's family to assist in rescuing her.

=== Other activities ===
The unit has been monitoring and investigating the clashes between the PKK and Turkish Armed Forces in the Kurdistan Region, the Iranian attacks on the Kurdistan Region in 2022, the attacks on US bases during the Gaza war, including the various drone attacks on oil infrastructure and on the Erbil International Airport and 2026 Israeli–United States strikes on Iran.

On 29 November 2025, CTD personnel provided security for Masoud Barzani during his visit to Cizre in Turkish Kurdistan. During the visit, CTD operators were reportedly equipped with military uniforms, automatic rifles, and patches bearing the Kurdistan flag. The display drew criticism from Devlet Bahçeli, leader of Turkey’s Nationalist Movement Party (MHP), who described it as a “violation of sovereignty rights.” In response, the office of Masoud Barzani rejected the criticism as “the product of a chauvinist mentality,” stating that all security measures during the visit were conducted in accordance with protocols agreed upon with Turkish officials.

== Capabilities ==
Like other Peshmerga forces in the Kurdistan Region the CTD is well equipped, having received international training and funding during the War against the Islamic State.

The unit possesses various mobility assets, including armored Humvees and trucks. The force also operates a small airforce of at least three EC135 helicopters and an unspecified number of EC635 helicopters, of which some are fitted with the Paramount Group FLASH (Flexible Light Armaments System for Helicopters) upgrade. These helicopters were most probably provided by Jordan.

CTD operators have trained with the US' Delta Force for more than a decade. According to a former Delta Force commander, their Kurdish counterparts “are serious professionals, well-trained and committed," contrasting them with elements of the Iraqi military, which he described as less reliable.

== See also ==
- Gulan Forces – Peshmerga unit affiliated with the Kurdistan Democratic Party
- CTG Kurdistan – Peshmerga unit affiliated with the Patriotic Union of Kurdistan
