= Mansour Barzani =

Kurdish politician and army officer (born 1978)

- مەنسوور بارزانی
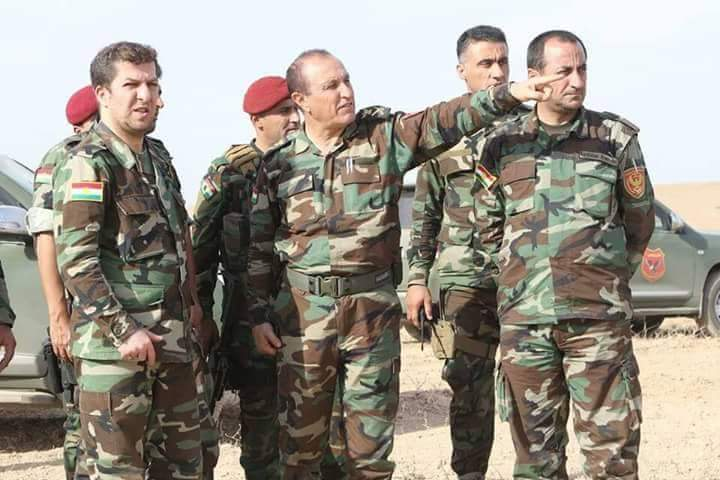
- Front row, from left to right, Mansour Barzani, Bahjat Selki, and Serdar Doski.
- Born: June 19, 1978 (age 48)
- Military career
- Allegiance: Kurdistan Democratic Party
- Service: Peshmerga
- Service years: 2003–present
- Rank: Major General
- Units: Gulan Special Forces and 1st Support Forces Command
- Commands: Commander of the Gulan Special Forces and of the 1st Special Forces,
- Known for: Leading Peshmerga forces in operations against ISIS
- Conflicts: War in Iraq (2013–2017); Battle of Mosul; Shirqat offensive; 2015 Shengal Offensive; Battle of Gwer

Mansour Barzani (Kurdish: مەنسوور بارزانی, romanized: Mensûr Barzanî, born June 1978) is the Liwa of the First Special Forces Division and of Gulan Special Forces. He is the son of former Kurdistan Region President Masoud Barzani and the younger brother of Masrour Barzani.

In April 2026, his estate in Beverly Hills was facing forfeiture by the United States Department of Justice after he allegedly defrauded the US federal government.

== Early life ==
Mansour Barzani was born in June 1978 into the prominent Barzani family, as the son of Masoud Barzani. He has one older brother, Masrour, and three younger siblings: Waysi, Babo, and Muksi. He also has three sisters.

== Career ==
Mansour Barzani has been part of the Peshmerga since at least 2003. He was injured in a US-friendly fire incident in which 18 Peshmerga fighters were killed.

Around the time of the creation of ISIS, Mansour was given command of a Special Forces division. On the 14th of August 2016, he fought against ISIS and liberated Kaka'i and Shabaki Kurdish-majority areas from ISIS control. In December 2014, he led the Peshmerga's advance toward Mosul and the Mosul Dam. From the 16th of August 2016 to the 18th of August 2016, Mansour ordered an offensive that freed three more villages from ISIS. During the offensive, Peshmerga were instructed to prevent the militants from fleeing. In the battle, Peshmerga killed 130 ISIS militants.

In March 2016, he led a protest against the Gorran Movement's anti-patriotic rhetoric. He also held another protest in 2018 against the central Iraqi Government's closure of the Rabia road.

He has been a vocal critic of the United States's inadequate support for the Peshmerga.

On the 5th of May, 2018, he spoke out against the Kurdish factions in Baghdad who'd been "slandering" the Peshmerga.

On the 21st of March, 2024, he worked with Duhok's governor, Ali Tatar. To provide 117 apartments and compensation for those affected by the flooding situation in Duhok and Zaxo.

During the 2024 Kurdistan Region parliamentary election, he led the KDP's list and campaign in Duhok.

== Defrauding the US Department of Defense ==
In April 2026, the US Department of Justice filed a forfeiture complaint against Mansour Barzani to seize his mansion in Beverly Hills. He allegedly bought the estate with money gained from defrauding the US federal government during its fight against ISIS.
