= Kurdistan Region Police =

Police force of the Kurdistan Region of Iraq

Kurdistan Region Police پۆلیس هەرێمی کوردستان Polîs Herêmî Kurdistan
- Motto: 'The Citizen Is Our Priority'

Jurisdictional structure
- Operations jurisdiction: Kurdistan Region of Iraq
- Legal jurisdiction: Kurdistan Region of Iraq
- Governing body: Kurdistan Regional Government
- General nature: Local civilian police

Operational structure
- Overseen by: Ministry of Interior (KRG)

Website
- services.gov.krd/en/taxonomy/term/133

The Kurdistan Region Police (Kurdish: پۆلیس ھەرێمی کوردستان, romanized: Polîsî Herêmî Kurdistan) serves as the primary civil law enforcement agency of the Kurdistan Region of Iraq, distinct from other institutions such as the Peshmerga (military forces), the Asayish (domestic security agency), Zerevani (gendarmerie), and Parastin u Zanyari (foreign intelligence).

The Kurdish police handle civil and traffic enforcement, environmental and forest protection, immigration control, and the security of critical infrastructure such as oil and gas facilities, utilities, hospitals, and other public institutions, sharing some of these responsibilities with the Asayish, which in addition carries out specialized operations such as against terrorism and drug trafficking. At times, the police is also supported by the Zerevani.

Women also serve in the police force.

== Legal jurisdiction ==
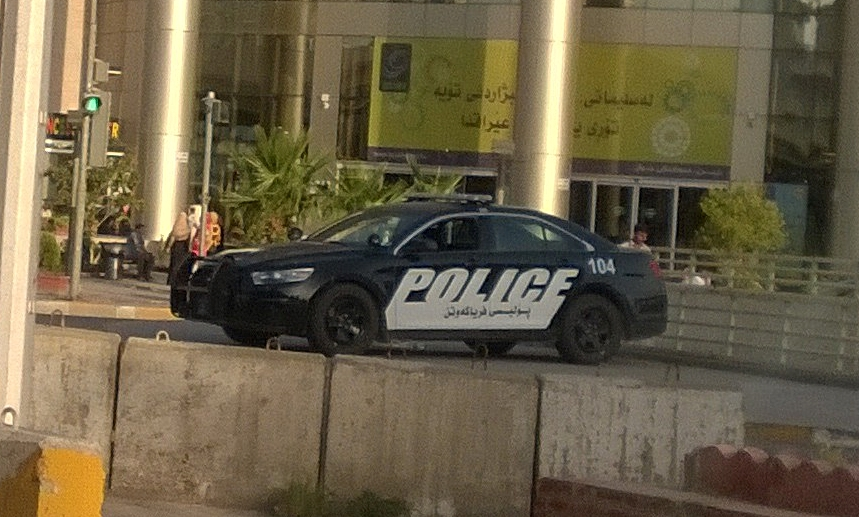
Picture of a Kurdistan Region's traffic police car in Erbil

Crimes committed outside the Kurdistan Region but apprehended within it are handed over to the Iraqi Police, while crimes committed within the Region, whether by outsiders or not, are handled by the Kurdistan Region Police.

During the war against the Islamic State, the Kurdistan Region expanded its control over large parts of the disputed territories. Subsequently, Kurdistan Region police forces were deployed outside the Region's formal boundaries, for example to Tuz Khurmatu.

== See also ==
- Asayish (Kurdistan Region)
- Iraqi Federal Police
