= Rebar Ahmed Khalid =

Iraqi Kurdistan official (born 1968)

Rebar Ahmed Khalid Barzani (born 1 July 1968) is an Iraqi Kurdish politician, interior minister of Iraqi Kurdistan, and a candidate for president of Iraq in 2022 after 2021 Iraqi parliamentary election. and on 13 October 2022, he withdrew his candidacy for the position.

== Career ==
- Major General and Head of the Joint Coordination Department of Kurdistan Region Security Council, 2012.
- Director of Intelligence Analysis of the Kurdistan Region's Parasteen Agency, 2005–2012.
- Director of Counter-Organized Crimes for the Defense Department of the Kurdistan Region's Agency, 2000–2005.
- Director of Organize (Rekhesten) Office, 1997–2000.
- Member of the Administration Committee of Kurdistan Students’ Union, 1993–1997.
- Member of the KDP's Office, Since 1997.
- Member of the Shanadar Organization for the Reconstruction of Kurdistan, 2000.
- Member of the Kurdistan Engineering Union.
