= Parastin u Zanyari =

Kurdish foreign intelligence agency

Parastin û Zanyarî
Agency overview
- Formed: May 21, 1968; 58 years ago
- Preceding agencies: Parastin; Zanyari
- Type: Government agency
- Headquarters: Sulaymaniyah, Kurdistan Region,
- Employees: Classified
- Agency executive: Mani Hana Miran, Commander-in-Chief
- Parent agency: Kurdistan Region Security Council

Parastin û Zanyarî (Sorani Kurdish: ئاژانسی پاراستن و زانیاری, lit. 'Protection and Information') is a government agency, sometimes described as foreign intelligence agency, and primary investigative arm belonging to the Kurdistan Regional Government (KRG) of Iraq.

== History ==
The organization is now a governmental agency part of Kurdistan Region Security Council (KRSC) that was established after combining and uniting Kurdistan Democratic Party's (KDP) intelligence service (called Parastin) and Patriotic Union of Kurdistan's (PUK) intelligence service (called Zanyarî) under the name of Parastin û Zanyarî. Parastin was first established in 1968 by the KDP. Parastin û Zanyarî has been sometimes referred to as a "Kurdish Intelligence Service (KIS)". The primary function of the agency is investigation of crimes relating to both the internal and external security of the Kurdistan region. The agency has power to arrest or detain people without a warrant & shares intelligence with the Kurdistan's security service, Asayish, which holds jurisdiction over a number of crimes in the region including terrorism.

Although founded and funded by the KDP and PUK, it officially acts under the command of the Kurdistan Regional Government.

The commander in chief of Parastin û Zanyarî is Mani Hana Miran.
