= Asayish (Kurdistan Region) =

Domestic security agency of the Kurdistan Region

Kurdistan Region Asayish
- ئاسایشی هەرێمی کوردستان; Asayîşa Herêma Kurdistanê
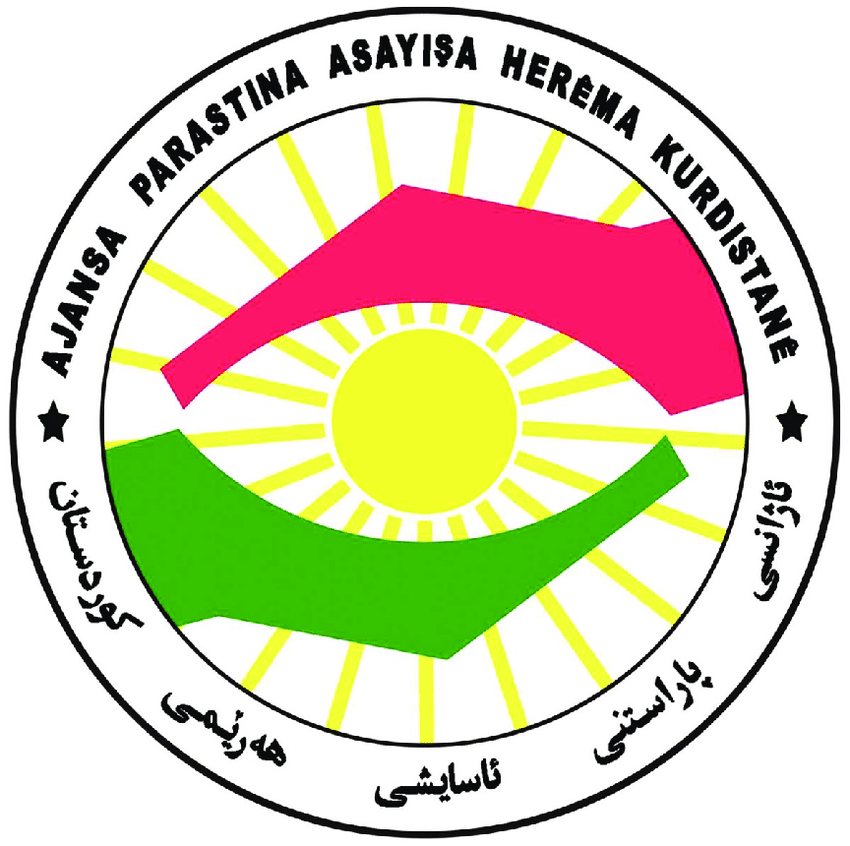
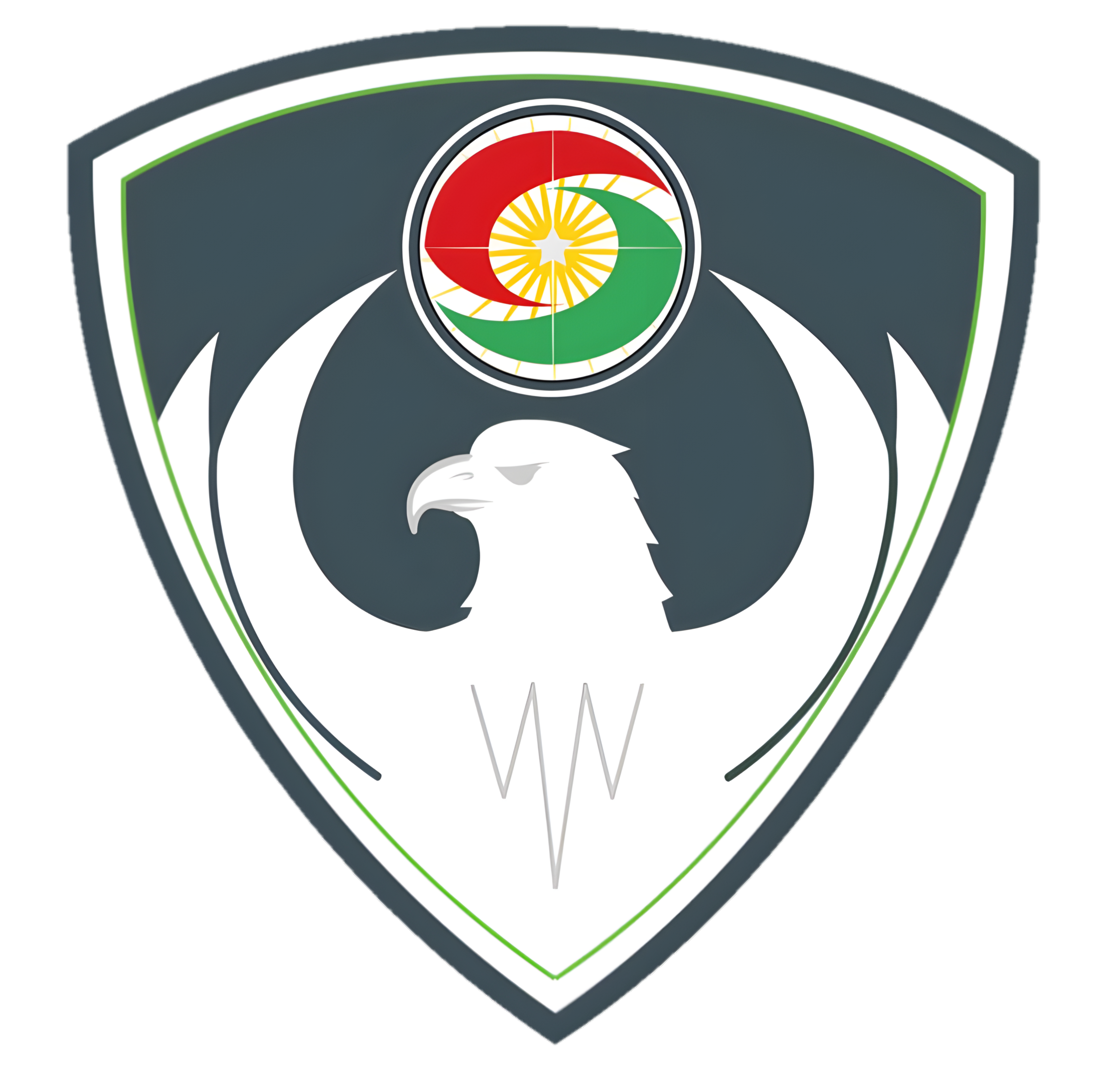
- KDP Asayish logo PUK Asayish logo

Agency overview
- Formed: 1992; 34 years ago
- Jurisdiction: Kurdistan Region
- Headquarters: Erbil, Duhok and Sulaymaniyah
- Employees: 10000–12000 (2017)
- Agency executive: Dr. Xesrew Gul Ismet Erguşî
- Parent agency: Kurdistan Region Security Council; KRG Ministry of Interior

Asayish (Kurdish: ئاسایش, romanized: Asayîş, lit. 'security') is the domestic security agency of the Kurdistan Region of Iraq. The organization was established in September 1993 and has been often referred to as an intelligence agency, security force, security service, security, secret service, secret police, or just "Kurdish police." However, it is distinct from the region's Kurdish police force but shares some responsibilities with it.

The Asayish is divided into two branches: one affiliated with the Kurdistan Democratic Party (KDP), which primarily operates in Erbil and Duhok, and another affiliated with the Patriotic Union of Kurdistan (PUK), which mainly operates in Sulaymaniyah and Halabja. The Asayish coordinates and shares information with its sister organization, the Kurdistan Region’s investigative and foreign intelligence agency, Parastin u Zanyari.

== Primary missions ==
The Asayish acts under the command of the Kurdistan Parliament and the Kurdistan Regional Government (KRG), specifically the Ministry of Interior.

According to the KRG the Asayish's official goals are:

- Counter-drug trafficking
- Counter-terrorism
- Counter-espionage
- Gathering intelligence
- Assessing threats to the region's national security.

They have jurisdiction over a number of crimes including:

- Economic crimes
- Smuggling
- Political crimes
- Espionage
- Sabotage
- Terrorism in accord with Article 4 of the Anti-Terrorism Law in Iraq

=== Security missions ===
The Asayish conducts a network of security operations, which include:

1. Checkpoints: Asayish checkpoints are present throughout the Kurdistan Region, typically on roads between towns. Using the KRG's vehicle plate system, Asayish forces distinguish between blue plates (official vehicles), red plates (taxis), white plates (private vehicles), and foreign Iraqi plates. This system allows them to stop and question drivers, and, based on their Kurdish or non-Kurdish accent, assess whether the person is a local commuter.
2. Immigration: Due to the KRG's separate visa and residency system, applicants from the rest of Iraq may be required to attend an interview at an Asayish headquarters when applying for residency.
3. Monitoring: Although officially not stressed, the Asayish is known to maintain a network of informants and plain-clothes officers who patrol cities and towns, listening to accents. Those deemed suspicious are interrogated.

Following the emergence of the Islamic State, these security operations increased in scope and intensity.

== History ==
Asayish members were initially drawn from the ranks of the Peshmerga following the 1991 Iraqi uprisings. Like the Peshmerga forces, the Asayish was divided after the Kurdish civil war in 1994 into branches affiliated with the KDP and the PUK, each having operated under separate Ministries of Interior. In 2009, when the KRG’s Ministry of Interior was nominally unified, the Asayish was also unified de jure, however, divisions along party lines persisted.

According to available sources, it remains unclear whether either branch has a formally codified legal basis for its existence beyond the loosely defined framework of its parent body, the Kurdistan Regional Security Council (KRSC), which was established in 2011.

== Asayish SWAT units ==
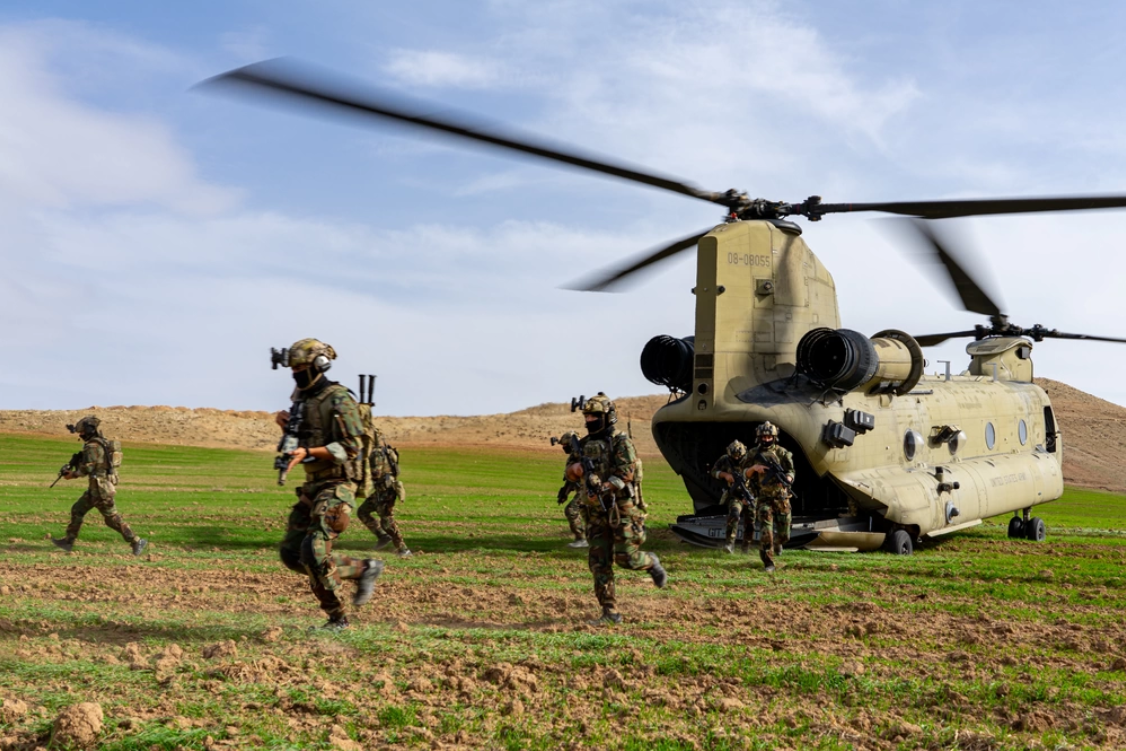
Asayish SWAT members offload from a 11th Expeditionary Combat Aviation Brigade CH-47 Chinook helicopter during an air assault training exercise.

The Asayish SWAT units are special operations forces within the PUK's Asayish branch. They frequently conduct anti-ISIS operations, including raids, in Suleymaniah, Halabja, Kirkuk, Ranya, Shahrizor, and areas near Chamchamal.

On several occasions they've conducted their operations in conjunction with the Kurdistan Commando Forces, the CTG Kurdistan, the Iraqi National Intelligence Service, and the Iraqi Ministry of Interior.

In 2022, they've conducted training exercises with the U.S. Army's 11th Expeditionary Combat Aviation Brigade.

== Criticism ==
Scholars have described the Asayish as having an authoritarian aura, while citizens of the Kurdistan Region are allegedly reluctant to speak about the agency.

In 2009 Amnesty International accused Asayish of abusing human rights, including torture and other ill-treatment, and claimed that the agency was "above the law" in Iraqi Kurdistan. The KRG criticized Amnesty by stating:

Most of the information provided in the report chronicles problems we had just after the fall of Saddam, when we were still subject to Saddam-era penal codes...Amnesty had a particular agenda and used dubious information, often very old, to paint an unrealistically harsh picture of the security forces in our Region by bringing up allegations of abuse at prisons such as in Akre, which have long been closed.

— Kurdistan Regional Government

In November 2016, Amnesty International reported that Kurdish authorities (namely Peshmerga and Asayish) had taken part in Kurdification, by forcefully displacing Arabs in Kirkuk by bulldozing homes and banishing the residents.

== Gallery ==
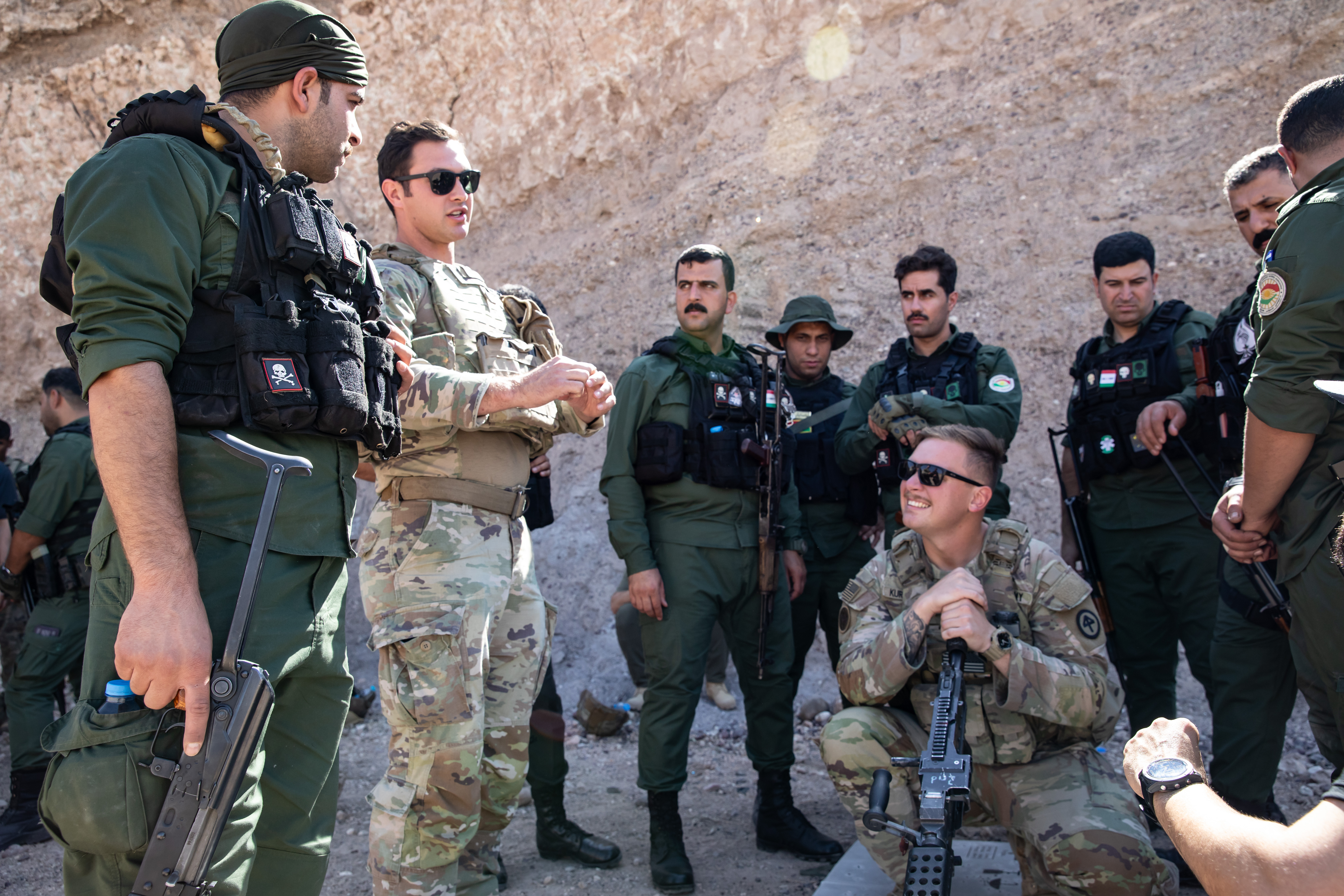
Asayish training with U.S. soldiers in 2024.

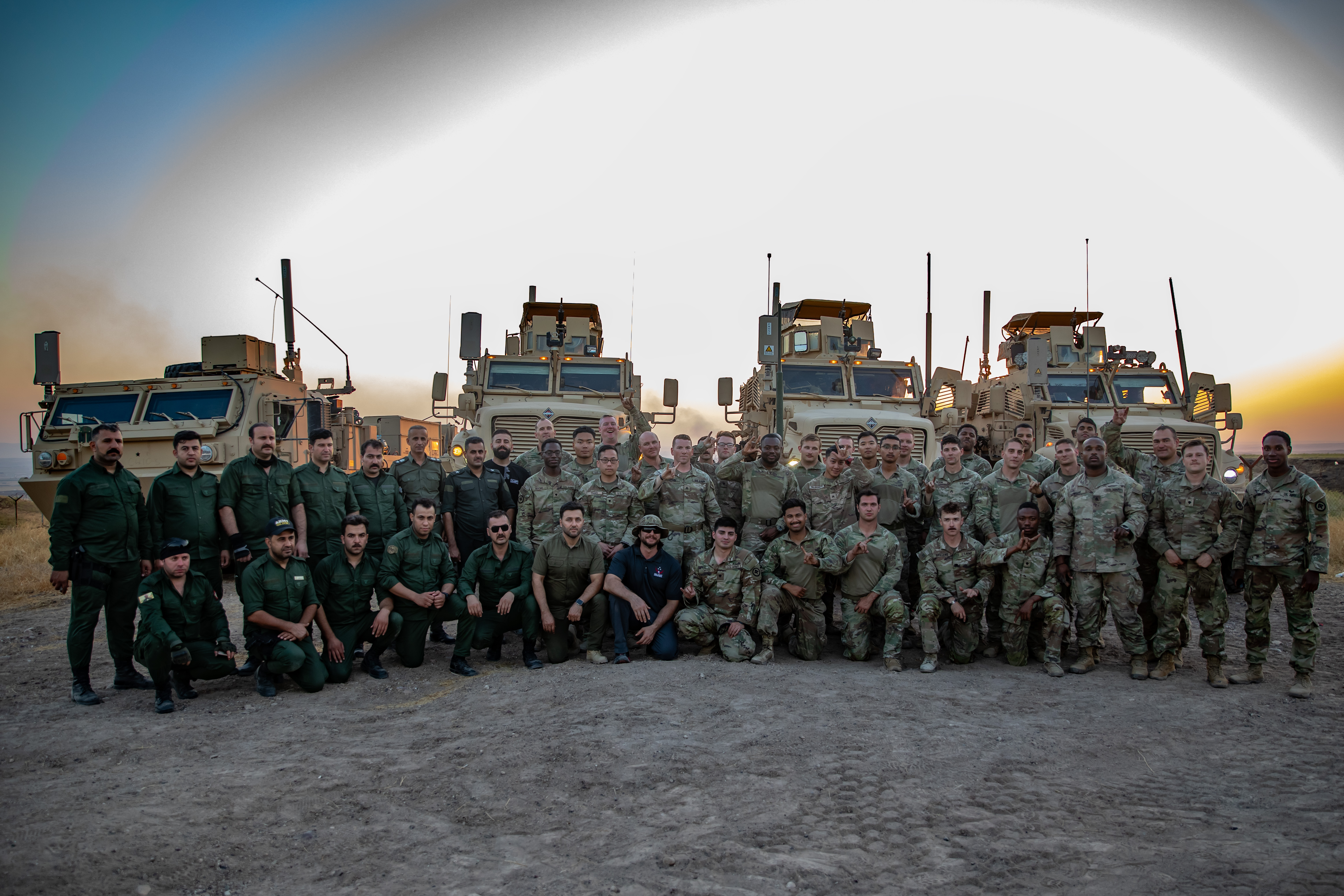
U.S. soldiers of the 181st Infantry Regiment with Asayish members.

=== Logos ===
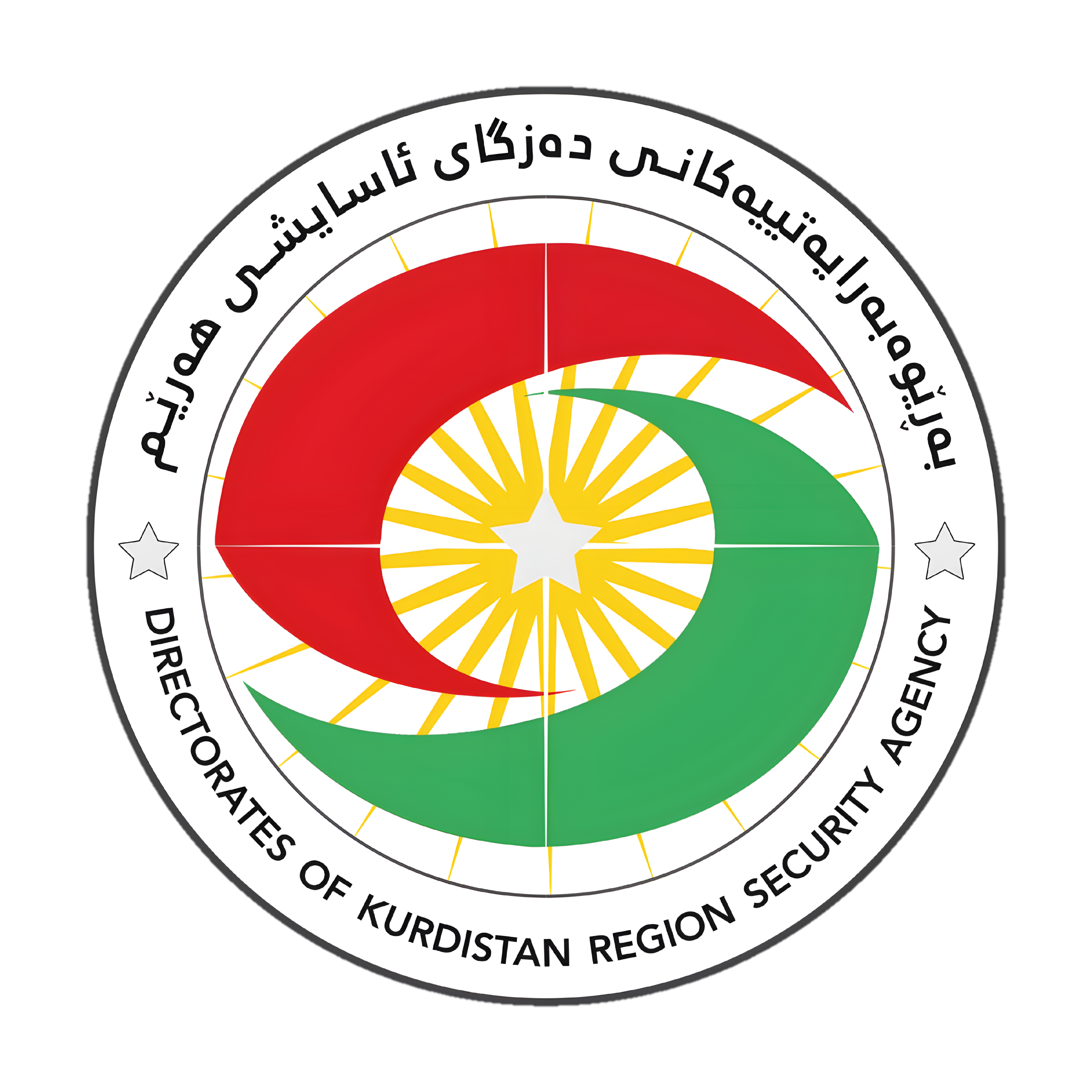
Logo of the KDP's Directorate of the Kurdistan Region Asayish.

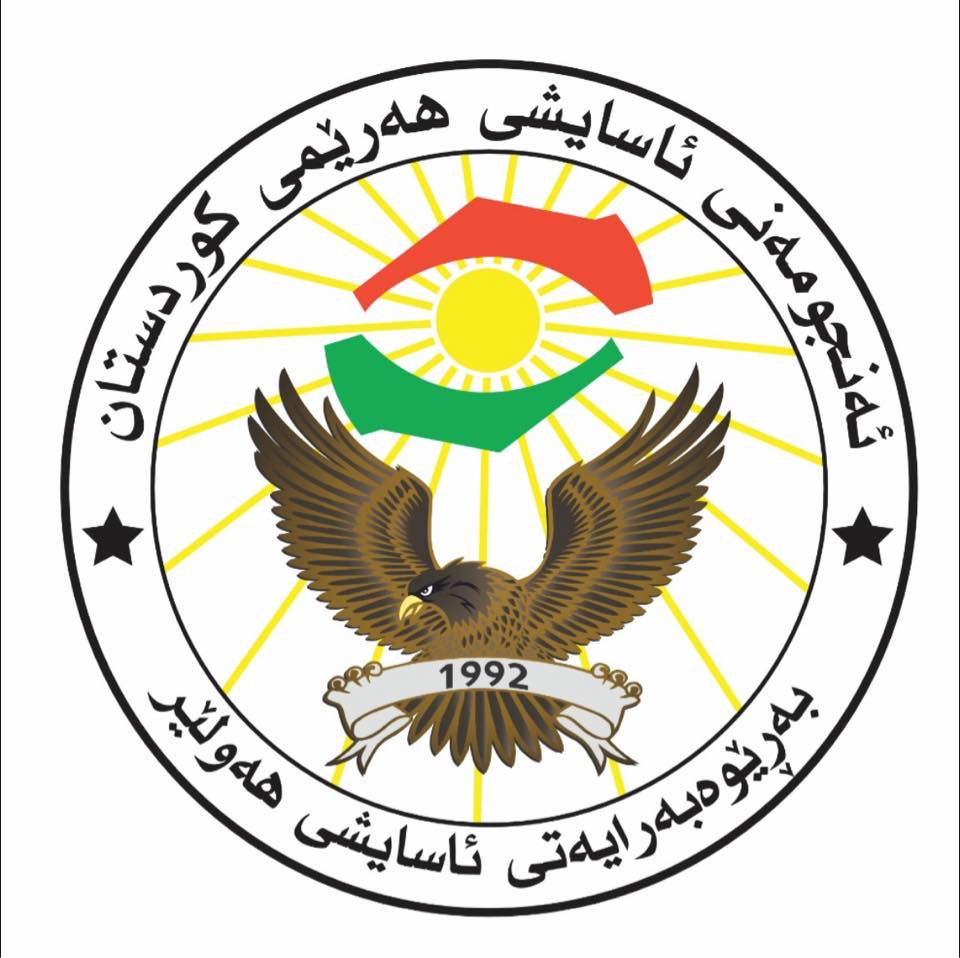
Logo of the KDP's Directorate of Asayish for the city of Erbil.

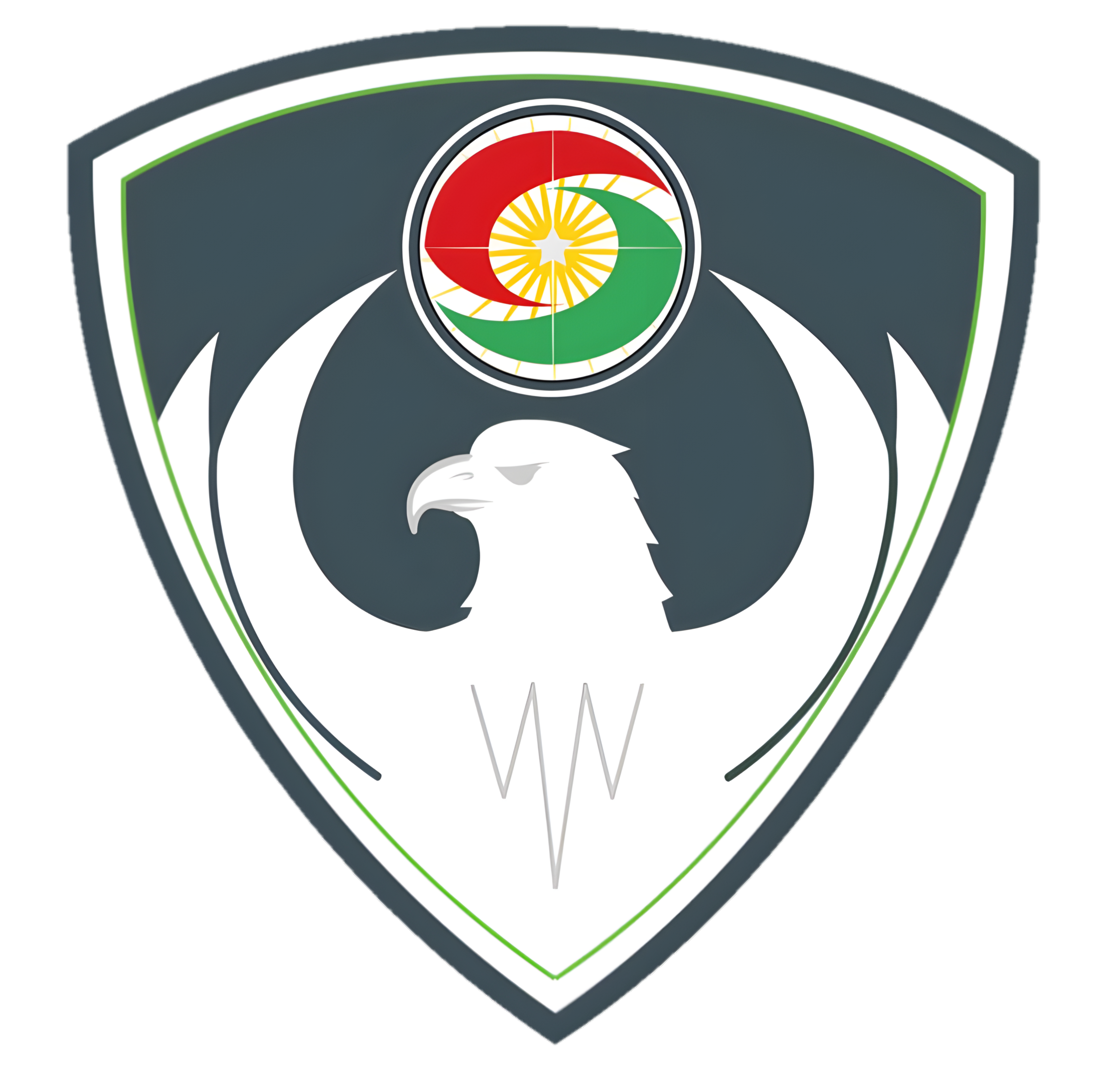
Logo of the PUK's Directorate of the Kurdistan Region Asayish.

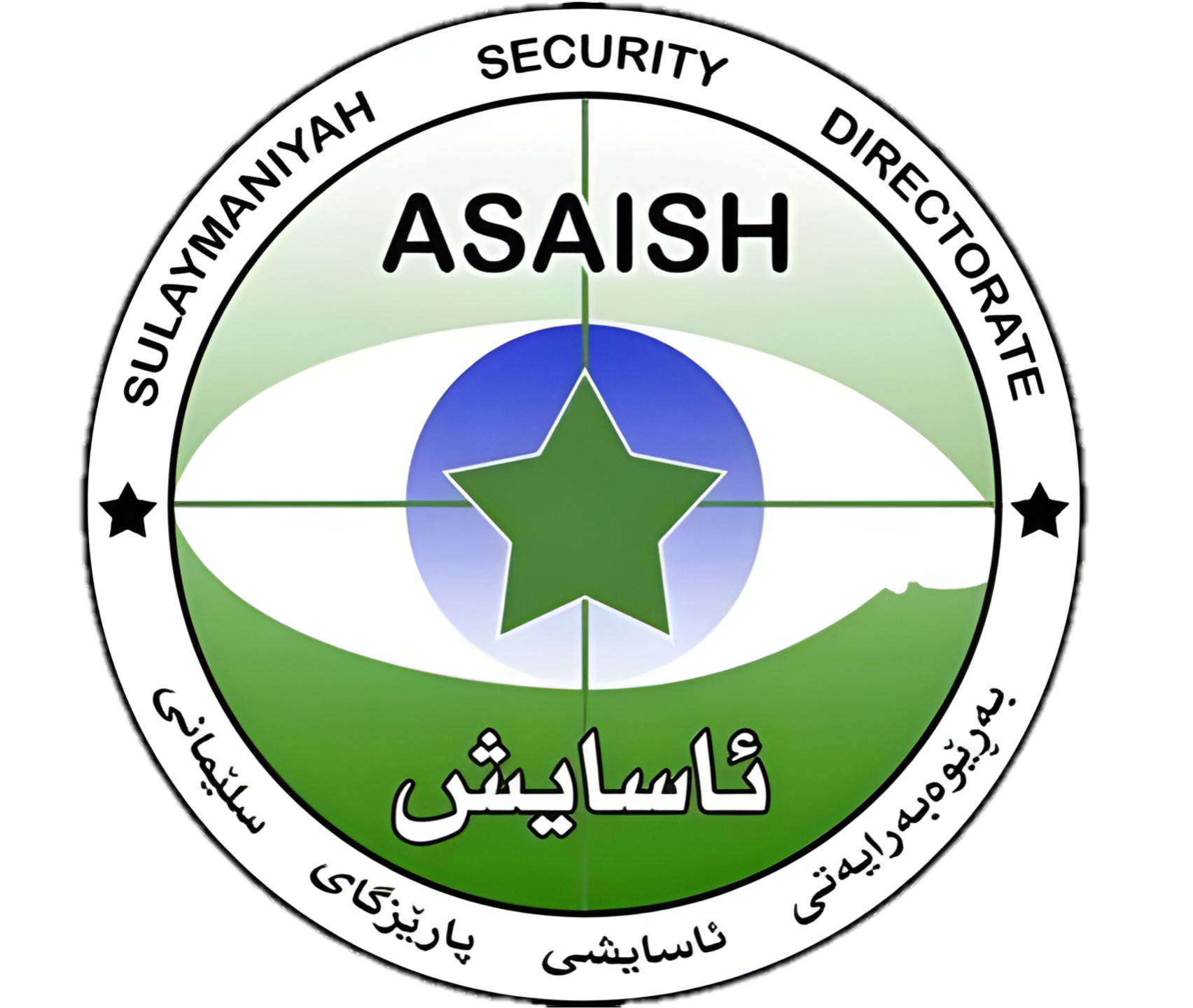
Logo of the PUK's Directorate of Asayish for the city of Sulaymaniyah.

== See also ==
- Asayish (Rojava regions)
- Asayish (Sinjar district)
- Erbil Asayish Directorate
- List of armed groups in the Iraqi Civil War
- List of armed groups in the Syrian Civil War
