= Kurdistan Region Security Council =

Organization

- ئەنجومەنی ئاسایشی هەرێمی کوردستان; Encumena Asayişa Herêma Kurdistanê
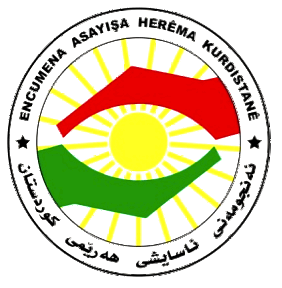

Governmental organization overview
- Formed: May 2, 2011; 15 years ago
- Preceding Governmental organization: Kurdistan Region Intelligence Service (KRIS) Or (KIS)
- Type: Governmental agency
- Jurisdiction: Kurdistan Region, Iraq
- Status: Active
- Headquarters: Erbil, Kurdistan Region, Iraq
- Governmental organization executive: Masrour Barzani, Chancellor
- Parent department: Kurdistan Region Presidency
- Child Governmental organization: Counter Terrorism Department (CTD)
- Website: krsc.gov.krd

The Kurdistan Region Security Council (KRSC, Kurdish: ئەنجومەنی ئاسایشی هەرێمی کوردستان, romanized: Encumena Asayîşa Herêma Kurdistanê) is a high-level national security council in the Kurdistan Region of Iraq.

== History ==
It was created in 1992, but was formally established on 2 May 2011 pursuant to Law 4 of 2011 passed by the Kurdistan Parliament. The body is responsible for inter alia a unified security policy and coordination between security services, military intelligence and existing intelligence agencies.

== Chancellor appointment ==
The council is part of the region's presidency and is headed by a chancellor appointed by the president of the Kurdistan Region. In July 2012 Masrour Barzani, former head of the Kurdistan Region Security Protection Agency and leading member of the ruling Kurdistan Democratic Party, was appointed as Chancellor by Kurdistan Region President Masoud Barzani.

== Counter Terrorism Department ==
The Counter Terrorism Department (CTD) is a hybrid special forces unit and investigative agency within the KRSC responsible for analyzing and combating domestic and international terrorism. It shares its intelligence with KRSC members, in particular the Chancellor, to support counter-terrorism efforts and "protect the interests of the Kurdistan Region".

== War on ISIL ==
In wake of the Islamic State of Iraq and the Levant offensive against the Kurdistan Region in August 2014, KRSC has been coordinating international coalition airstrikes against ISIL positions. In April and May it announced the arrest of several individuals connected to a car bomb attack near the US Consulate General in Erbil by the Islamic State in Iraq and the Levant.

=== Operation Free Sinjar ===
The battle for Sinjar, code-named Operation Free Sinjar, was a large offensive supervised by the President of the Kurdistan Region in November 2015. The operation included over 7,500 Peshmerga, backed by international coalition warplanes, against ISIL positions in and around Sinjar.

Before beginning their attack, Peshmerga forces were positioned in three strategic fronts North, East and West of Mount Sinjar to sever Highway 47, a strategic ISIL supply route to move supplies between Iraq and Syria. According to Kurdish authorities, the objectives were also to cordon off the area by creating a buffer zone South of Sinjar and to then enter and clear the city.

Coalition warplanes began pounding ISIL positions at 2100hrs on 11 November ahead of a ground offensive at 0600hrs on 12 November. Having achieved all three strategic objectives, the operation concluded at approximately 1500hrs on 13 November. The Kurdistan Region Security Council announced more than 28 villages were retaken in an area measuring over 200 square kilometers, and 300 ISIL fighters were killed throughout battle.

==== Media coverage ====
The Kurdistan Region Security Council announced that more than 40 local, regional and international media outlets were invited and embedded with Peshmerga units across the fronts in preparation for this offensive.

A hash tag, #FreeSinjar, was preplanned as part of the operation to generate global traction and overshadow the ISIL narrative on social media.
