= Patrick Allman-Ward =

British Geologist

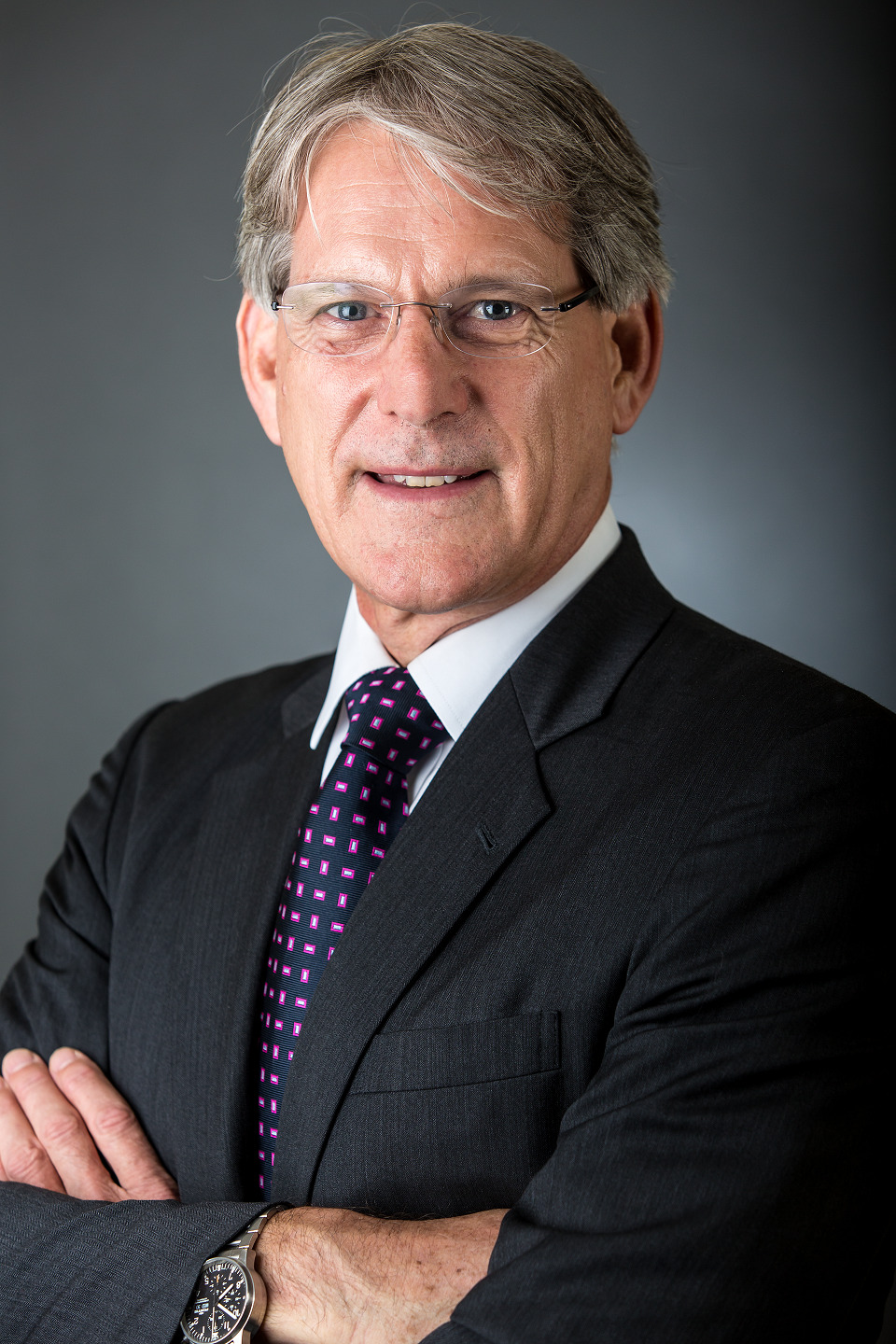
- Born: Patrick Adrian Allman-Ward; October 24, 1955 (age 70); Bangkok, Thailand
- Citizenship: British
- Education: Imperial College London (Ph.D.)
- Years active: 1982–present
- Known for: Dana Gas (former CEO)
- Children: 3

Patrick Adrian Allman-Ward (born October 24, 1955) is a British geologist, petroleum industry executive, and former CEO of Dana Gas.

== Early life and education ==
Allman-Ward was born on October 24, 1955, in Bangkok, Thailand, and spent his early years in Jakarta and Istanbul before continuing his education in the UK. In 1973, he began studying geology at Durham University.

In 1976, he pursued an MSc in Mineral Exploration and Mining Geology at Leicester University, graduating in 1977. He later earned his PhD in Mining Geology from the Royal School of Mines, Imperial College London, in 1981.

== Career ==
=== Shell ===
Allman-Ward started his career at Shell in 1982. He went on to hold senior roles including Vice-President Exploration for Asia-Pacific, Chief Executive Officer and Board Member of the South Rub Al-Khali Company, Vice-President of New Business Development in Saudi Arabia, and New Ventures Execution Manager for Europe.

=== Dana Gas ===
He joined Dana Gas in 2012, initially as their General Manager and Country Chairman of their assets in Egypt before being invited in 2013 to become CEO of the Dana Gas Group, a publicly listed company on the Abu Dhabi stock exchange and headquartered in Sharjah, UAE. Between 2015 and 2018 Patrick was also an executive member of the Board of Directors.

On 6 November 2023, Richard Hall succeeded Patrick Allman-Ward as CEO of Dana Gas, with Patrick transitioning into an advisory role to the new CEO. Patrick retired from Dana Gas in March 2024.

=== Current roles ===
He is currently the Executive Chairman and CEO of his own Petroleum Industry Consultation business, the Vice Chairman of United Terra Enterprises, a petroleum and renewable energy company based in Europe and the Chairman of Terra Mining, which holds gold mining licenses in Zimbabwe and is expanding its mining activities to other African countries.

Allman-Ward was included in Forbes’ list of the 50 Most Influential Expats in the UAE in 2018.
