= Crescent Petroleum =

Oil and gas company in the Middle East

- Industry: Oil and gas
- Founded: 1971
- Headquarters: Sharjah, United Arab Emirates
- Area served: Middle East
- Key people: Hamid Jafar (Group Chairperson); Majid Jafar (Chief Executive Officer); Badr Jafar (President)
- Services: Oil and gas exploration, production, and transport
- Website: www.crescentpetroleum.com

Crescent Petroleum is the first and largest private upstream oil and gas company in the Middle East. Founded in 1971, Crescent Petroleum is headquartered in the Emirate of Sharjah, United Arab Emirates (UAE), with current operations in both the UAE and the Kurdistan Region of Iraq (KRI). As of 2023, Crescent Petroleum and the Iraqi Ministry of Oil have signed three twenty-year contracts as the company focus it efforts in aiding the redevelopment of Iraq.

Crescent Petroleum is also the founding and largest shareholder in Dana Gas, the first and largest publicly listed private-sector natural gas company in the Middle East.

The company is a subsidiary of Crescent Group, a diversified family business that includes Crescent Enterprises, a multinational company headquartered in the UAE, as the other main subsidiary. Crescent Petroleum's chairperson and founder is Hamid Jafar and its CEO is Majid Jafar.

== History ==
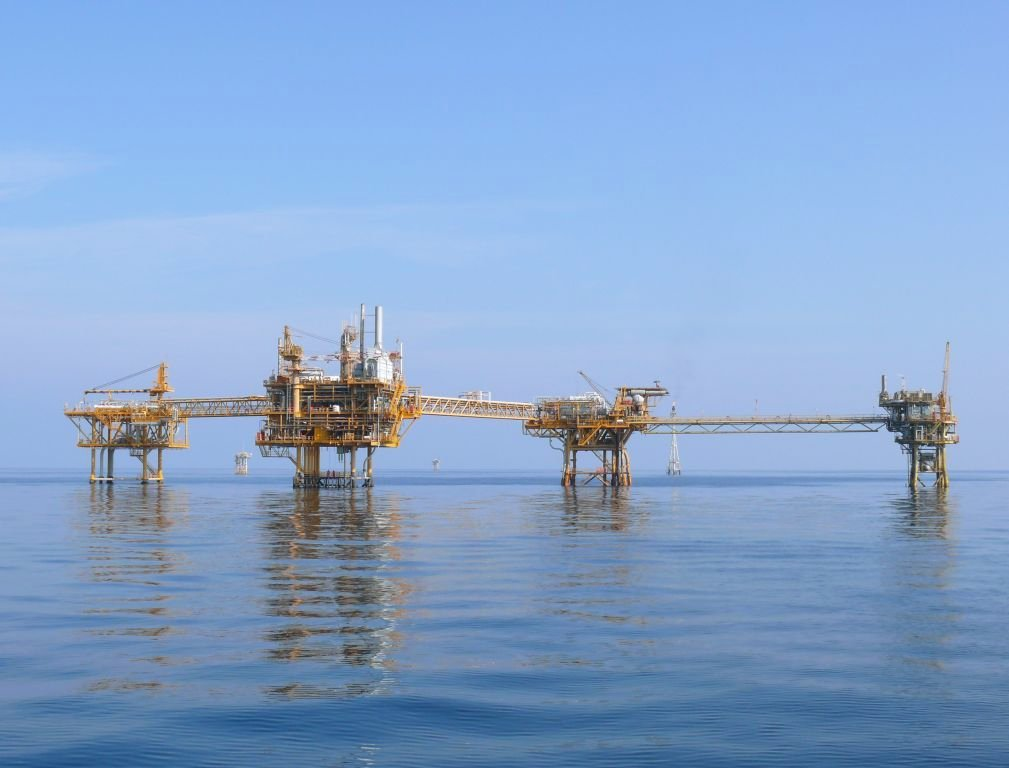
Mubarek oil field

Crescent Petroleum's emergence is linked to its offshore discoveries in the Mubarek field in 1972. In 1969, the UAE government granted the Mubarek field to concessionaire Buttes Gas & Oil Co. International Inc., a wholly owned subsidiary of Crescent Petroleum.

Setting the world record at the time, Crescent Petroleum had the Mubarek field in full production within 13 months from the discovery of the confirmation well, at a rate of over 60,000 barrels of oil per day. The project brought Sharjah into international recognition.

Crescent Petroleum's first international venture was in 1973, when it was granted the exploration rights for Block 1, an offshore area in present-day Montenegro, which was then part of Yugoslavia. It was followed in 1981 by concessions for a 232 square kilometres (90 sq mi) block in the San Jorge Basin of Argentina. In 1979, Crescent Petroleum discovered the Zora gas field—currently owned and operated by Dana Gas—off the coast of the United Arab Emirates.

In 1986, Crescent Petroleum obtained exploration concessions for blocks in the Potwar Basin in Pakistan, later forming a joint-venture with Amoco (today BP), which was held through to 1990. During the 1980s and 1990s, Crescent Petroleum secured additional concessions in Canada, France, Tunisia, Egypt, Pakistan, and Yemen. During the downturn in the energy sector in the 1990s, Crescent Petroleum made the decision to divest itself from its international positions and refocus attention on opportunities in the Middle East and North Africa region.

In 2002, Crescent Petroleum became the technical services provider for the Bukha field, offshore Oman. It was also the technical operator for concessions in Ajman, Umm Al Quwain and Ras Al Khaimah up until 2004.

Dana Gas was founded in 2005, with Crescent Petroleum as single-largest shareholder. The company's IPO was the most successful and largest IPO in the UAE's history, attracting more than US$2 billion from investors in over 50 countries. In 2007 Dana Gas and Crescent Petroleum entered the Kurdistan Region of Iraq (KRI). The following year, Gas Cities was established as a joint-venture between Crescent Petroleum and Dana Gas. The new company was established to create industrial cities in the MENASA region (Middle East, North Africa and South Asia), which are designed to systematically use natural gas as fuel and feedstock for industrial projects.

From 2012 to 2014, Crescent Petroleum pre-qualified for various regional projects.

== World Records ==
Crescent Petroleum has earned several operational world records including the deepest short radius horizontal section drilled and the deepest slim hole to be cased by expandable casing in 1992.

== Corporate structure ==
=== Overview of corporate structure ===
The Iraqi family business group is led by Chairman Hamid Jafar with his two sons as key executives. Majid Jafar is Vice-Chairman of Crescent Group and Chief Executive Officer of Crescent Petroleum while Badr Jafar is Managing Director of Crescent Group, President of Crescent Petroleum, and Chief Executive Officer of Crescent Enterprises.

== Current operations ==
Crescent Petroleum has current operations in the UAE and the Kurdistan Region of Iraq (KRI), and interests in Egypt through its affiliate Dana Gas. The company is headquartered in the UAE and has international offices in the UK and throughout Iraq. It currently operates in Iraq and the UAE.

=== Iraq ===
Crescent Petroleum has had a continuous presence in Baghdad for 30 years and has a special commitment to the country because of the Jafar family's roots. The company has offices in Erbil and Sulaymaniyah in northern Iraq.

In the 1990s, Crescent Petroleum was invited to negotiate contracts for the development of ten large oil fields with reserves between one and ten billion barrels of oil and nine blocks in the western desert. In 2005, Crescent Petroleum signed a Memorandum of Understanding (MoU) with the Iraqi Oil Exploration Company (OEC), a division of the Iraq's Ministry of Oil, detailing a multi-level cooperation and an appraisal study for one of the existing giant oil fields in southern Iraq. Crescent Petroleum agreed to train personnel from the Ministry of Oil and affiliated companies and helped in the process of implementing the appraisal study. In order to also execute the other details of the MoU effectively, Crescent Petroleum and the Ministry of Oil have set up a Joint Steering Committee for technical cooperation, which also coordinates Crescent Petroleum's involvement in the development of the Ratawi oil field, a major oil field (over 10 billion barrels of estimated capacity) in southern Iraq that Crescent Petroleum explored in earlier studies.

In April 2018, during Iraq's fifth bidding round, the Government of Iraq awarded Crescent Petroleum three oil and gas concessions, Gilabat-Qumar and Khashim Ahmer-Injana in Diyala Governorate and Khidhr Al Mai in the south of Iraq. The contracts were initialled and are awaiting signature, following which the company will invest in developing the fields.

=== Iraq–Khor Mor and Chemchemal fields in the KRI ===
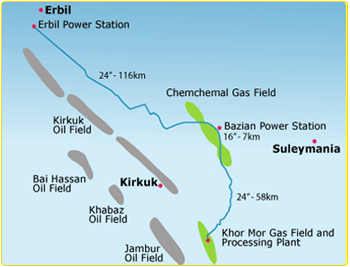
Khor Mor and Chemchemal fields

In April 2007, Dana Gas entered into an agreement with the Kurdistan Regional Government of Iraq (KRG) for the appraisal and development of two major gas fields in the Kurdistan Region of Iraq: Khor Mor and Chemchemal. In October 2007, Dana Gas assigned 50% of its interest in the contract to Crescent Petroleum. Since 2007. Dana Gas and Crescent Petroleum began developing the fields together as the operator.

The terms of the contract grant exclusive rights to appraise, develop, market, and sell petroleum products from the substantial Khor Mor and Chemchemal gas fields, and to provide natural gas supplies to fuel two major domestic electric generation plants being built in Erbil and Chemchemal as well as for local industries and export.

In February 2009, Dana Gas and Crescent Petroleum transferred their participating interests to Pearl Petroleum Company Limited, a joint venture company owned equally by Dana Gas and Crescent Petroleum. Later that year, OMV of Austria and MOL of Hungary, two major European energy companies, each became 10% shareholders in Pearl Petroleum. In 2015, RWE of Germany became the third member with a 10% share of the company.

The project was implemented 15 months after the signature of the agreement. It involved upstream development (the hook up, testing and re-commissioning of existing gas wells, acquiring 2D seismic data and installing gas separation and treatment facilities), the construction of two liquefied petroleum gas (LPG) plants and 180 kilometres (112 mi) of pipeline in mountainous terrain, which the operator cleared from minefields in cooperation with non-profit organization Mines Advisory Group (MAG). Gas deliveries to the Erbil power station commenced in October 2008.

Crescent Petroleum and Dana Gas were one of the first international oil and gas companies to invest in the KRI, following their owners' commitment to the region. In the 1950s, the grandfather of Majid Jafar opened two hydroelectric dams in the KRI. When the companies started producing gas in the KRI in 2008, they were the first ones to develop and execute the infrastructure required to supply two domestic power plants in the KRI.

Pearl Petroleum's investment in the Kurdistan gas project is one of the largest private-sector investments in the KRI's oil and gas industry and provides electricity supply to over five million citizens. Multinational professional services firm PwC estimated that the project contributed between US$10.7 billion and US$18.3 billion to the KRI's GDP in 2017 through the delivery of electricity, with the fuel cost savings substitution by gas to the KRG from the project's inception to 2017 amounting to US$19.2 billion. The reduction of greenhouse gas emissions following the transition from diesel to gas at both Erbil and Chemchemal power plants was estimated to be 29 million tonnes of carbon dioxide equivalent until 31 December 2017.

In 2019, Pearl Petroleum signed a 20-year gas sales agreement with the KRG to enable production and sales of an additional 250 million cubic feet per day (7.1 million cubic metres per day) by 2021 to further support local electricity generation. The USD 700 million expansion, currently underway at the Khor Mor plant, is to include two production trains in addition to the drilling of new wells to raise gas production to 900 million cu ft/d (25 million m^{3}/d) by the end of 2023. The consortium has appointed an engineering, procurement and construction (EPC) contractor to deliver the first of the two production trains at the Khor Mor plant. The first phase will increase production output by 60 percent to 650 million cubic feet per day (18 million cubic metres per day) by Q1 2022 while the second phase of the expansion will eventually bring total production to 900 million cubic feet per day (25 million cubic metres per day).

In 2018, Pearl Petroleum also completed a plant de-bottlenecking project to increase gas output by 30%. It currently produces 100,000 barrels of oil equivalent (boe) per day in the KRI. The daily production includes 430 million cubic feet per day (12 million cubic metres per day) and 15,500 barrels of condensate, with an LPG capacity of over 1,000 tonnes per day. Pearl Petroleum's total cumulative production from 2008 to December 2019 was more than 294 million boe, including 1,198 billion cubic feet (30 billion cubic metres) of gas, 49.2 million barrels of condensate and 1.99 million tonnes of LPG.

=== UAE–Sir Abu Nu'ayr concession ===
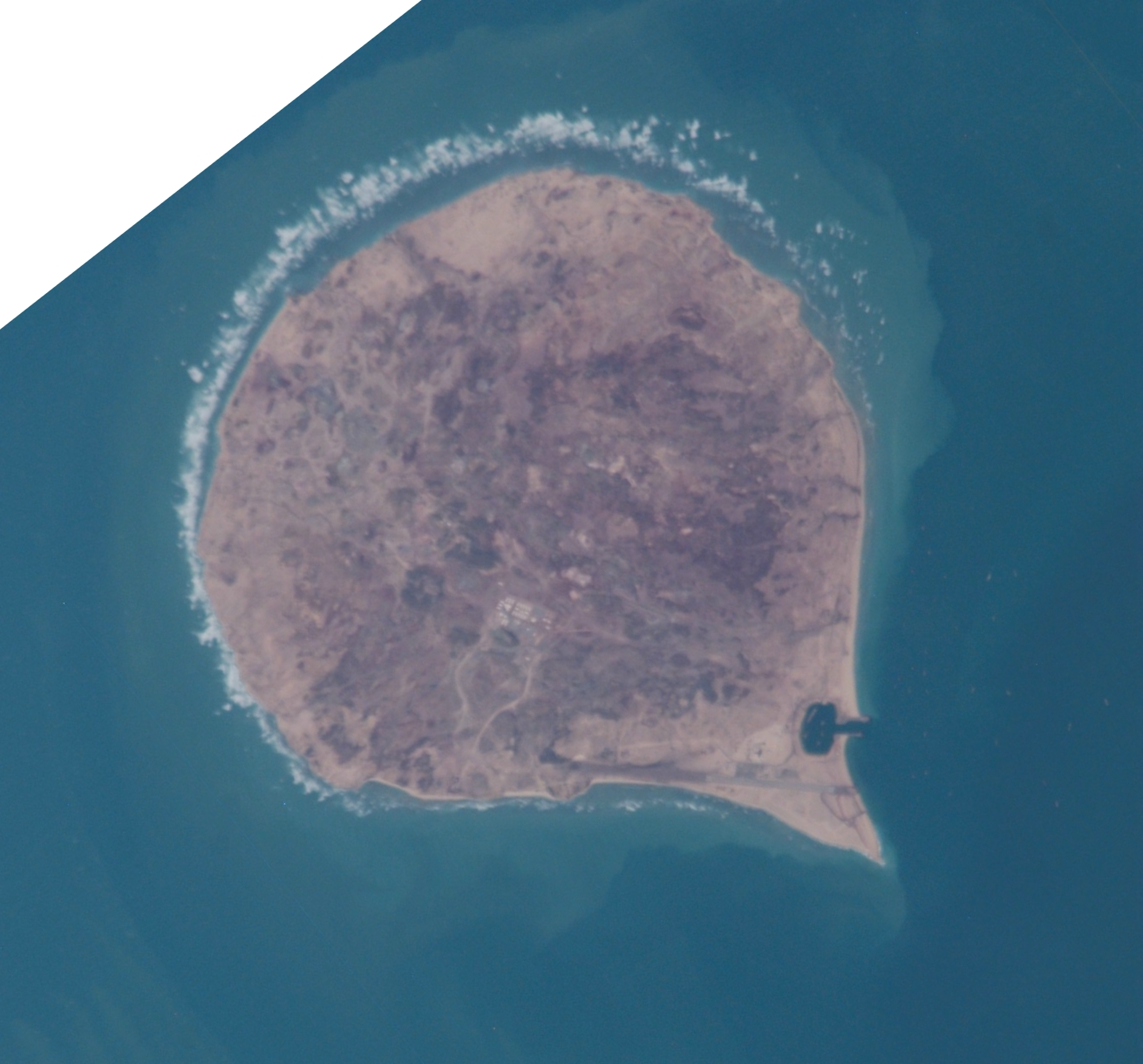
Sir Abu Nu'ayr island

The island of Sir Abu Nu'ayr (SAN), located at the centre of the 12 nautical miles concession area, is part of the Emirate of Sharjah and is located 80 kilometres (50 mi) offshore of Abu Dhabi, in the middle of the offshore oil territory. The acreage is flanked to the east by Dubai's Fateh Oil Field complex, to the north by the Sirri oil field of Iran and to the west by the oil and gas fields of Abu Dhabi.

Crescent Petroleum carried out successful a 2D seismic acquisition in 1999 in the field. It followed it in 2008 by a comprehensive 3D/2D survey design study that used Raytrace modelling and included all target reservoirs across the island and the entire concession area.

A further study in 2009 developed the play concepts of the salt-related structures based on available data. In 2012, Crescent Petroleum conducted an Airborne Gravity and Magnetic Survey over SAN and it surrounds, covering an area of 400 square kilometres (150 sq mi), to develop the exploration work programme.

=== UAE–Gas supply project ===
The UAE gas supply project involves the transportation, processing, distribution, marketing and sale of natural gas and related petroleum products from Iran and Crescent Petroleum's local resources for the UAE market. Crescent Petroleum has facilitated the development of the UAE's gas market and developed and executed several large-scale gas-projects prior to the Gas Supply Project, including the first inter-Emirate onshore gas supply contract from Sharjah for the UAE Federal Ministry of Electricity and Water in 1985, a contract between the Emirate of Sharjah and Dubai in 1986 and the first offshore inter-Emirate gas sales and purchase agreement through a dedicated pipeline from its offshore Mubarek facilities to Jebel Ali, Dubai in 1991.

For the gas supply project, National Iranian Oil Company (NIOC) signed a 25-year gas supply agreement with Crescent Petroleum in 2001.

The UAE infrastructure for the project, involving a gas sweetening plant and transmission facilities, were set up with initial investments of around $300 million. The infrastructure is largely owned by SajGas and UGTC, subsidiaries of Dana Gas (PJSC). NIOC also invested more than US$1.5 billion in the project, developing on-site production at the Salman offshore field and critical transport facilities. The first gas supply from Iran was scheduled to begin in 2008 but no supplies were ever made.

In July 2009, Crescent Petroleum filed an arbitration case against NIOC. After several years, an international tribunal ruled in 2014 that the 25-year contract for National Iranian Oil Co., to supply gas to Crescent Petroleum, was valid and NIOC was in breach of its obligation to deliver gas since December 2005. Crescent Petroleum is currently pursuing its claims for damages through international arbitration.

=== Egypt ===
Through its affiliate Dana Gas, Crescent Petroleum has been engaged in Egypt's oil and gas market since 2007. Dana Gas operates 14 leases under three concessions in the Nile Delta acreage and a 26.4 per cent stake in a gas liquids extraction plant in the Gulf of Suez.

== Previous operations ==
=== Mubarek field (1969–2009) ===
The first project handled by Crescent Petroleum was the Mubarek field off the coast of the UAE. In 1969, the offshore exploration and development concession for the Mubarek field off the coast of Sharjah was first signed through Buttes Gas & Oil Co. International Inc., a wholly owned subsidiary of Crescent Petroleum.

Offshore seismic work started in 1971. The first explorational drilling began in 1972 and the work was put on fast-track following initial discovery confirming results. Although the Mubarek reservoir lies at a great depth and has a complex stratigraphy (with the incidence of thick and mobile salt, fracturing, high-pressure water flows and successive layers of over-pressured and under-pressured formations), within 13 months from the discovery of the confirmation well in 1972, the field was on full production at a rate of over 60,000 barrels per day (9,500 m^{3}/d). This was a world record at the time for bringing an offshore field onstream from oil discovery.

The project involved the drilling of three additional wells, the installation of the processing platform, an additional wellhead platform, export loading terminal, pipelines, and associated support structures.

Since the start of production in 1974, the Mubarek field had undergone several development phases. In 1977, Crescent Petroleum completed the initial phase of the development of Ilam/Mishrif oil reservoir, at a depth of 4,700 metres (15,420 ft).

In 1986, Finish Neste Oy and the Bahrain-based Intoil signed an agreement with Crescent Petroleum for an offshore drilling program in the Mubarek field. The agreement detailed the drilling of 11 wells between 1986 and 1995 at a cost of $110 million.

The company commenced the development of the Thamama gas condensate reservoir at a depth of 4,700 metres (15,420 ft) in 1987 for the production of gas and condensate.

In January 1993, further gas sales were agreed upon with Dubai and through Consolidated Transmissions Inc., a subsidiary of Crescent Petroleum, the building of a 92 kilometres (60 mi) offshore gas transmission pipeline commissioned. The pipeline has a transport capacity of 150 million cubic feet (4.2 million cubic metres) per day at standard conditions. The total production of the Mubarek field exceeded 100 million barrels of oil and condensate as well as around 300 billion cubic feet of natural gas. The total processing capacity stood at around 60,000 bopd of oil and gas.

In 1996, Enterprise Oil (Shell) signed an agreement with Crescent Petroleum to further develop the Mubarek field. The agreement entailed $25 million for a 3D seismic survey of the field and the drilling of at least two new wells, with a 40% share of future output from the wells going towards Enterprise Oil. In the following year, Crescent Petroleum entered an agreement for further exploration of Mubarek with OPIC Middle East Corporation, a subsidiary of Chinese Petroleum Corporation (now CPC Corporation, Taiwan).

In 2004, an agreement with Sastaro Limited (a subsidiary of Sky Petroleum) was signed to further develop the Mubarek field. In late 2005, the company drilled further infill wells to increase petroleum production.

Crescent Petroleum's total investment into the Mubarek field exceeded US$500 million. After continuous production of 35 years, Crescent Petroleum handed the concession for the Mubarek field back to the Sharjah government in 2009. The company determined that the field had come to its economic and commercially relevant end. With this decision, all operational facilities were also handed over to the government of Sharjah.

=== Sharjah onshore concession (2010—2016) ===
In May 2010, Crescent Petroleum and the Russian government-owned oil company, Rosneft signed a strategic cooperation agreement to jointly develop upstream oil and gas opportunities in the Middle East and North Africa region.

The following month, the two companies signed a farmout agreement in the presence of then Russian Deputy Prime Minister Igor Sechin. Under the terms of the agreement, both companies would jointly develop the Sharjah onshore concession, with Rosneft holding a 49% stake as participating interest. The two companies agreed to invest nearly US$60 million in initial exploration activities, including the drilling of two oil wells to a depth of 4,500 metres (14,760 ft). The project aimed to produce condensates and natural gas liquids that could be consumed domestically and exported internationally. The agreement also included the responsible development of local infrastructure.

Since 2014, two wells have been drilled. The concession was relinquished in February 2016.

=== Montenegro/Former-Yugoslavia (1973–1990) ===
From 1973 to 1990, Crescent Petroleum held the exploration rights for Block 1 in the South Adriatic Basin off the coast of Montenegro. In a joint venture with Jugopetrol Kotor the company held 49% interest of the 3,830 square kilometres (1,480 sq mi) area. Although good potential drilling prospects were identified in the block, the concession was handed back in 1990 due to political turmoil.

=== Argentina (1981–1983) ===
From 1981 to 1983, Crescent Petroleum held the concessions for a block offshore in the Jorge Basin along the Atlantic Coast near Comodoro Rivadavia in the Patagonian province of Chubut in southern Argentina. In a joint venture with Golfo Petrolero the company held a 52.44% interest of the 232 square kilometres (90 sq mi) area. The company sold their interests to Yacimiento Petroliferos Fiscales (YPF).

=== Pakistan (1986–1990) ===
From 1986 to 1990, Crescent Petroleum held the concessions for two blocks offshore in the Potwar Basin near the River Indus in the northwestern flank of the Potwar Basin in Pakistan. Crescent Petroleum initially held 95% of the working interest but then developed a seismic program and the first well drilling together with Amoco (now BP), sharing the concessions in a joint venture. On expiry in 1990, the concessions were handed back to the Government of Pakistan.

=== Canada (1989–1990s) ===
In 1989, Crescent Petroleum bought a controlling interest in Buttes Resources Canada Limited (BRCL), the holder of significant oil and gas production and reserves in the provinces of Alberta and Saskatchewan, as well as large exploration acreage in the provinces of British Columbia and the Northwest Territories, Canada. In the early 1990s, the company sold its interest in BRCL.

=== Egypt (1990–1992) ===
In 1990, Crescent Petroleum held the East Khaledah concession covering an 861 km^{2} area in Egypt's Western Desert. The concession expired and was handed back to the Government of Egypt in 1992.

=== Yemen (1991–1995) ===
From 1991 to 1995, Crescent Petroleum held concessions for Block 2 and Block 9. As lead partner in a Production Sharing Agreement with British Gas, Louisiana Land and Exploration Inc., Clyde Petroleum, Itochu Corporation and Indonesia Petroleum Limited (Inpex), which had been signed in January 1991, Crescent Petroleum initially operated the 4,000 square kilometres (1,540 sq mi) each Blocks, later transferring operatorship of Block 9 to British Gas. Concessions were handed back to the Government of Yemen after completion of the work program.

=== Gulf South Asia Gas Project ===
In 1991, Crescent Petroleum launched the Gulf-South Asia Gas Project (GUSA), the first workable project for producing, transmitting by pipeline, and delivering natural gas from Qatar to Pakistan and eventually other locations across South Asia. GUSA was expected to lead the regional and global environmental advancements, since the successful completion of GUSA would have meant large quantity replacements of fuel oils in Pakistani energy plants. Crescent Petroleum invested more than US$30 million on the development schemes and advanced the project to a state of pre-implementation maturity; however, the project was aborted due to political constraints.
