= Mubarek oil field =

Oil and gas production area in the United Arab Emirates

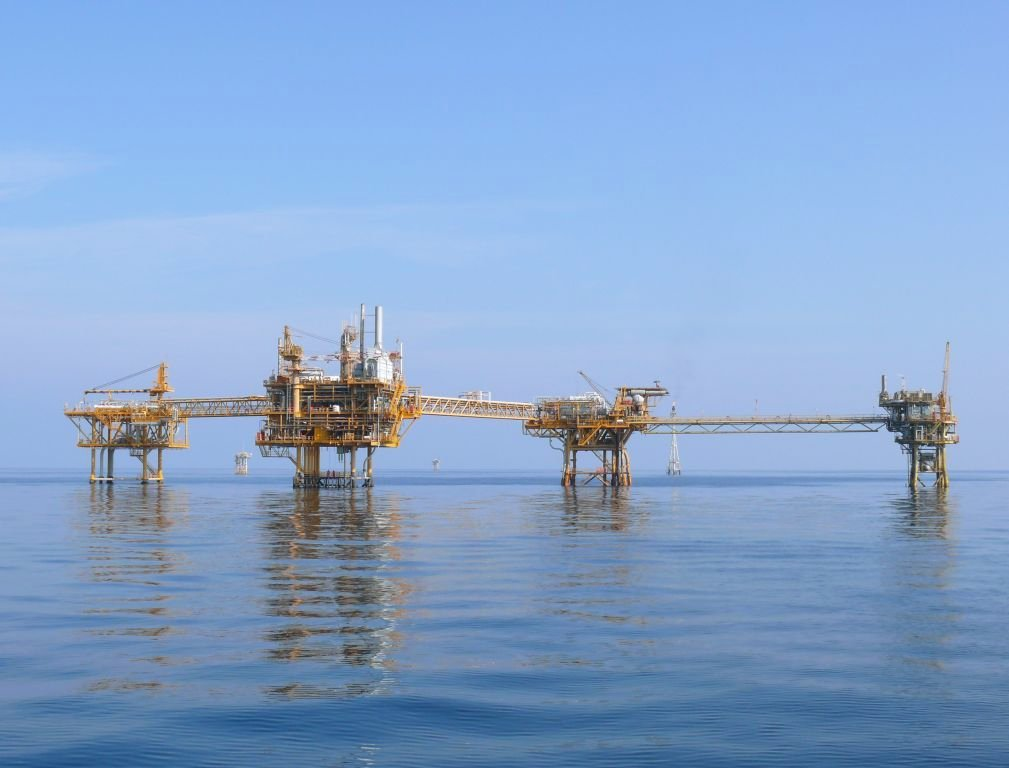

- Location within United Arab Emirates
- Country: Sharjah, United Arab Emirates
- Region: Persian Gulf
- Offshore/onshore: offshore
- Coordinates: 25°51′N 55°13′E
- Operator: Government of Sharjah

Field history
- Discovery: 1972
- Start of development: 1972
- Start of production: 1974

The Mubarek oil field (also transliterated Mubarak) is an offshore oil field in the Persian Gulf.

The oil revenues are shared between Sharjah and Iran under the Memorandum of Understanding between Iran and Sharjah concerning Abu Musa.

It was the first project handled by Crescent Petroleum.
