= Pearl Petroleum =

Kurdish oil and gas consortium

- Industry: Oil and gas
- Founded: 2009
- Area served: Kurdistan Region of Iraq
- Website: www.pearlpetroleum.com

Pearl Petroleum is a five-company consortium consisting of two Middle Eastern oil and gas companies, Dana Gas and Crescent Petroleum, which together are the operator of the Kurdistan Gas Project, in partnership with three major European energy companies: OMV, MOL, and RWE. Pearl Petroleum produces and develops natural gas assets in the Kurdistan Region of Iraq.

== History ==
Pearl Petroleum ownership (2026)
1. Dana Gas (35.0%)
2. Crescent Petroleum (35.0%)
3. OMV (10.0%)
4. MOL (10.0%)
5. RWEST (10.0%)

In April 2007, Dana Gas entered into an agreement with the Kurdistan Regional Government (KRG) for the appraisal and development of two major gas fields in the Kurdistan Region of Iraq: Khor Mor and Chemchemal. In October 2007, Dana Gas assigned 50% of its interest in the contract to Crescent Petroleum. Dana Gas and Crescent Petroleum began developing the fields together as the operator and have remained as such ever since.

The terms of the contract grant exclusive rights to appraise, develop, market, and sell petroleum products from the substantial Khor Mor and Chemchemal gas fields, and to provide natural gas supplies to fuel two major domestic electric generation plants being built in Erbil and Chemchemal as well as for local industries and export.

In February 2009, Dana Gas and Crescent Petroleum transferred their participating interests to Pearl Petroleum Company Limited, a joint venture company owned equally by Dana Gas and Crescent Petroleum. Later that year, OMV of Austria and MOL of Hungary, two major European energy companies, each became 10% shareholders in Pearl Petroleum. In 2015, RWE of Germany became the third member with a 10% share of the company. The project was implemented 15 months after the signature of the agreement. It involved upstream development, the construction of two liquefied petroleum gas (LPG) plants and 180 kilometres (112 mi) of pipeline in mountainous terrain. Gas deliveries to the Erbil power station commenced in October 2008.

Pearl Petroleum's investment in the Kurdistan Region of Iraq's gas project is one of the largest private sector investments in the KRI's oil and gas sector and provides electricity supply to over five million people in northern Iraq. Multinational professional services firm, PwC estimated that the project contributed between US$10.7 billion and US$18.3 billion to the KRI's GDP in 2017 through the delivery of electricity, with the fuel cost savings substitution by gas to the KRG from the project's inception to 2017 amounting to US$19.2 billion. The reduction of greenhouse gas emissions following the transition from diesel to gas at both Erbil and Chemchemal power plants was estimated to be 29 million tonnes of carbon dioxide equivalent up to 31 December 2017.

In August 2017, the KRG awarded Pearl Petroleum investment opportunities in blocks 19 and 20, which are adjacent to the Khor Mor field. Gas sales commenced in late 2018.

In 2019, Pearl Petroleum signed a 20-year gas sales agreement with the KRG to enable production and sales of an additional 250 million cubic feet per day (7.1 million cubic metres per day) at standard conditions by 2021 to further support local electricity generation. The USD 700 million expansion, currently underway at the Khor Mor plant, is to include two production trains in addition to the drilling of new wells to raise gas production to 900 million cu ft/d (25 million m^{3}/d) by the end of 2023. The consortium has appointed an engineering, procurement and construction (EPC) contractor to deliver the first of the two production trains at the Khor Mor plant. The first phase will increase production output by 60 percent to 650 million cubic feet per day (18 million cubic metres per day) by Q1 2022 while the second phase of the expansion will eventually bring total production to 900 million cubic feet per day (25 million cubic metres per day).

== Operations ==
Pearl Petroleum gas fields in Iraq

Pearl Petroleum is one of the largest private investors in the oil and gas sector of the Kurdistan Region of Iraq (KRI), having invested around US$1.76 billion from inception to December 2019. It supplies the fuel to generate electricity to the major cities of the KRI.

In the first stage of the commissioning of the Khor Mor field, Crescent Petroleum and Dana Gas recommissioned existing gas wells, built gas separation and treatment facilities, and constructed 180 kilometres (112 mi) of pipeline across mountainous terrain. Crescent Petroleum and Dana Gas commenced gas deliveries to the Erbil power plant in October 2008.

In the second stage of the project commissioning, completed in 2011, Pearl Petroleum installed a two-train liquid petroleum gas (LPG) plant with current gas production capacity of 330 million cu ft/d (9.3 million m^{3}/d) at standard conditions.

In 2018, Pearl Petroleum completed a plant de-bottlenecking project to increase gas output by 30%. It currently produces 100,000 barrels of oil equivalent (boe) per day in the KRI. The daily production includes 430 million cubic feet of gas per day (12.15 MSm³/d) and 15,500 barrels of condensate, with an LPG capacity of over 1,000 tonnes per day. Pearl Petroleum's total cumulative production from 2008 to December 2019 was more than 294 million boe, including 1,198 billion cubic feet (30 billion cubic metres) of gas, 49.2 million barrels of condensate and 1.99 million tonnes of LPG.

An impact assessment report authored by PwC estimated that the migration from diesel-powered electricity generation to cheaper, cleaner-burning natural gas has enabled the KRG to avoid more than 29 million tonnes of carbon dioxide equivalent from 2008 to 2017. Moreover, as gas is more affordable than diesel, the migration to gas was estimated to have helped the KRG save US$19.2 billion during this period.
