= Dana Gas =

Natural gas company

Dana Gas PJSC
- Type: Public
- Traded as: ADX: DANA
- ISIN: XS0914266845; XS0914699284
- Industry: Oil and gas
- Founded: 2005; 21 years ago
- Headquarters: Sharjah, United Arab Emirates
- Areas served: Egypt; Iraqi Kurdistan; United Arab Emirates
- Key people: Hamid Dhia Jafar (Chairman); Richard Hall (CEO); Chris Hearne (CFO)
- Products: Natural gas
- Revenue: US$445 million (2024)
- Net income: US$151 million (2024)
- Subsidiaries: Pearl Petroleum (35%)
- Website: danagas.com

Dana Gas PJSC is a publicly traded natural gas company, based in Sharjah, United Arab Emirates (UAE). Incorporated and listed on the Abu Dhabi Securities Exchange in 2005, Dana Gas is the largest non-government owned natural gas company in the Middle East, with operations in Egypt, the Kurdistan Region of Iraq (KRI), and the UAE. The company and Crescent Petroleum each hold a 35 percent stake in the Pearl Petroleum consortium. Hamid Dhia Jafar serves as chairman, and Richard Hall as chief executive officer.

== History ==
Dana Gas was incorporated and listed on the Abu Dhabi Securities Exchange in 2005 with founder shareholders being Crescent Petroleum, the Sharjah government, and hundreds of regional businesses and other individuals. The original project was to supply gas to the northern Arab Emirates from Iran based upon a gas supply agreement that was made between Crescent Petroleum and the National Iranian Oil Company (NIOC) in 2001.

In January 2007, Dana acquired Calgary-based Centurion Energy in the US$1 billion deal. Dana Gas raised $1 billion in convertible Islamic bonds, or sukuk, in London in 2007.

The 25-year agreement made between Crescent Petroleum and the NIOC resulted in completion of a pipeline from the Salman field to Sharjah. However, the pipeline has remained mostly unused because of allegations of corruption and a legal dispute. The pipeline was used briefly in 2010 when the NIOC sent gas to Dana Gas' Sharjah facility for testing purposes. As of late 2017, the parties (including Dana Gas) were awaiting the results of an arbitral tribunal in The Hague, following hearings to decide on the amount of damages that should be paid by NIOC to damaged parties to compensate for failing to supply the gas.

In May 2009, Dana Gas and Crescent Petroleum signed an agreement with MOL, OMV and RWE, shareholders of the Nabucco pipeline project, to create Pearl Petroleum for developing gas fields in Iraq's Kurdistan. As part of Pearl Petroleum, Dana Gas has had multiple disputes over rights and payments with the Kurdistan Regional Government (KRG). In 2013, Pearl Petroleum submitted a case against the KRG in the London Court of International Arbitration (LCIA), alleging the ruling body underpaid for gas liquid production and were denying other contractual rights. In November 2015, a London court ruled in the consortium's favor, confirming contractual rights for sole development and awarding damages for overdue payments totaling $1.98 billion. Another London court determined the KGR did not have sovereign immunity, and ordered full payment of $100 million within 30 days, but the parties agreed to a payment schedule. Dana Gas and RWE settled their dispute out of court, resulting in RWE acquiring a 10% stake in Dana Gas for an undisclosed amount. In February 2017, the LCIA determined the KRG had prevented Dana Gas from developing the Chemchemal and Khor Mor reservoirs, per the 2007 agreement. The court ordered the KRG to pay approximately $121 million plus interest for money owed; punitive damages would be determined later.

In April 2017, the International Court of Arbitration in London ruled in favor of the government's Ministry of Natural Resources, resulting in fewer payments to Dana Gas by the KRG. Pearl Petroleum then filed a petition one month later in a federal court in Washington, D.C., seeking damages of at least $26.5 billion because of project delays. The groups reached a financial settlement in August 2017, with the KRG paying $600 million (AED2.2 billion) to the companies, as well as $400 million (AED1.5 billion) for regional development. The settlement increased Dana Gas' cash balance and stock value. The KRG fell behind on payments to Dana Gas prior to the settlement, but all were submitted on time since the agreement was made.

Dana Gas and Crescent Petroleum started arbitration proceedings against MOL in September 2017 over the August agreement made by Dana Gas, the KRG, and Pearl Petroleum. MOL has a 10% stake in Pearl, and disagreed with the terms of the settlement. Before initiating proceedings, Dana Gas and Crescent Petroleum sold their shares of MOL in 2019.

== Operations ==
=== Egypt ===
The company has operated in Egypt since 2007. Dana Gas is the nation's fifth largest gas producer, and had fourteen development leases, three exploration concessions, and two processing plants, as of May 2018. The company was producing approximately 37,000 barrels (5,900 m^{3}) of oil equivalent per day at the time.

During 2008–2009, Dana Gas discovered the Sondos-1 and 2 dry gas wells, the Azhar-1 gas/condensate well, and the Tulip-1 gas well. The production test for the latter, located in the West Al Qantara Concession, yielded 11.4 million cubic feet per day (320 thousand cubic metres per day) and 318 barrels (50.6 m^{3}) of condensate per day. The company announced plans to develop an oil field in the Komombo basin south of Cairo in early 2010. In 2011, Dana Gas discovered the South Abu El Naga-2 dry gas well in the West El Manzala Concession, and was the sixth largest gas producer in the country. The company made two additional natural gas discoveries in 2012, and began operating a natural gas liquids plant. Commercial operations at the Allium-1 and West Sama-1 fields started in 2013, increasing gas production in Egypt by approximately 10%. Production for these fields occurs at the El Wastani and South El Manzala plants.

Dana Gas' El Wastani gas plant underwent maintenance and de-bottlenecking work in early 2014; planned upgrades increased production by 25% to 200 million cubic feet per day (5.7×10^{6} m^{3}/d). In 2014, two onshore concessions in the Nile Delta owned by the Egyptian Natural Gas Holding Company—North Al Salhiya (Block 1) and Al Matariya (Block 3)–were awarded to Dana Gas for six years. The two blocks had eleven and twelve wells, respectively, at the time, and joined Dana Gas' other Nile Delta concessions: the Al Manzala, West Al Manzala, and West Al Qantara. Dana Gas and BP formed a joint venture to drill the Al Matariya hydrocarbon exploration.

In 2014, Dana Gas was licensed to explore Block 6, which has three prospects totaling as much as 20 trillion cubic feet (570 billion cubic metres) of gas. The company is expected to start drilling its first exploration offshore well, which targets one of these three prospects, in 2019. Dana Gas announced the completion of the Balsam-8 well in 2018.

In December 2024, Dana Gas signed a new Consolidation Agreement with the Ministry of Petroleum and Mineral Resources and EGAS. The agreement combined existing concessions into a single concession area and added 297 square kilometres of new exploration acreage. Under the agreement, Dana Gas committed US$100 million to drill 11 new wells and increase recovery by 80 billion cubic feet.

By mid-2025, the company reported early success from this programme. The Begonia-2 appraisal well in the New El-Manzala concession confirmed initial reserves of nine billion cubic feet of gas and added five million cubic feet per day of production. Recompletion work at the Balsam-3 well is expected to add another three million cubic feet per day and four billion cubic feet of recoverable reserves.

=== Kurdistan Region of Iraq ===
Through the Pearl Petroleum consortium, Dana Gas and Crescent Petroleum operate the Chemchemal and Khor Mor (Sulaymaniyah Governorate) gas fields in Iraqi Kurdistan. Dana Gas has operated in Iraqi Kurdistan since 2007, and signed a ten-year gas sales agreement with the government in 2018. The Khor Mor plant, active since 2008, supplies natural gas to power stations in Bazian, Chemchemal, Erbil.

By April 2025, cumulative production from Khor Mor reached 500 million barrels of oil equivalent, with total investment exceeding US$3.5 billion. The plant supplies fuel for about 75 percent of the KRI’s electricity generation, providing power for more than six million people. Production in early 2025 averaged 525 million standard cubic feet per day (MMscf/d) of gas, 15,200 barrels per day of condensate, and 1,070 tonnes per day of LPG.

Dana Gas and Crescent Petroleum struck a twenty-year gas sales agreement with the KRG in 2019, as part of Pearl Petroleum. This included the KM250 expansion project, which began in 2019 and was completed in 2025, and added 250 MMscf/d of processing capacity, a 50 percent increase, raising total Khor Mor output to 750 MMscf/d.

By January 2026, Dana Gas had increased output at Khor Mor to more than 700 million cubic feet per day, a net production increase of 15,000 barrels of oil. However, in March 2026 all operations at Khor Mor were suspended due to the ongoing conflict between the U.S., Israel and Iran.

=== United Arab Emirates ===
In the United Arab Emirates (UAE), Dana Gas operates as offshore platform, pipeline, and onshore gas processing plant in the Zora gas field, near Sharjah. The company's $17 million contract for construction of the offshore platform was awarded to the Interserve subsidiary Adyard Abu Dhabi in November 2013. Commercial production began in 2016. The field yielded 2,700 and 1,650 barrels (429 and 262 m^{3}) of oil equivalent per day in 2016 and 2017, respectively.

== Corporate affairs ==
Sharjah-based Dana Gas is the largest non-government owned natural gas company in the Middle East, with assets in Egypt, Iraqi Kurdistan, and the UAE. The company is listed on the Abu Dhabi Securities Exchange. Dana Gas and its partner Crescent Petroleum each have a 35% stake in the Pearl Petroleum consortium. Crescent Petroleum is Dana Gas' largest founding shareholder, with a nearly 20% stake.

=== Leadership ===
Richard Hall was appointed chief executive officer in November 2023, succeeding Patrick Alman-Ward. Hamid Dhia Jafar began serving as chairman of the board of directors in 2015; Al Jarwan was elected to serve as vice chair at the same time. Ahmed bin Sultan Al Qasimi, Deputy Ruler of Sharjah from 1990 until his death in 2020, was the company's honorary chairman; its annual reports list him in that role from the 2007 report to the 2019 report. Chris Hearne serves as the current chief financial officer.

=== Financials ===
For the full year 2024, Dana Gas reported revenue of AED 1.63 billion (US$445 million), a 5 percent increase from 2023, and net profit of AED 553 million (US$151 million). Excluding a one-off impairment charge in Egypt, net profit was AED 674 million (US$184 million), a 15 percent rise.

In February 2025, the Board of Directors recommended a dividend of 5.5 fils per share.

=== Sukuk ===
In 2012, Dana Gas became the first UAE company to not repay Islamic bonds on maturity, due to backlogged payments from Egypt and Iraqi Kurdistan. The company was owed more than US$500 million by customers, as of mid 2012. Dana Gas' five-year, $1 billion sukuk matured on October 31; $920 million was outstanding after the company repurchased approximately $80 million of the sukuk in 2008.

In 2017, Dana Gas entered a legal dispute after stopping payments on $700 million in sukuk, which the company said was no longer Shariah-compliant. The decision had potential to set a new precedent within the Islamic finance industry. The company initially offered to replace the sukuk with new securities producing a lower average current profit rate, then retracted the proposal in favor of adjudication following rejection by creditors. Dana Gas was set back by a series of rulings in the United Kingdom, and the British and UAE courts delivered conflicting rulings on the company's dividend payments. The sukuk matured in October, but remained unsettled.

In May 2018, Dana Gas and creditors represented by Deutsche Bank, including BlackRock and Goldman Sachs, agreed to issue new sukuk valued at $530 million. A majority of sukuk holders voted in favor of the agreement in June. Dana Gas completed the issuance, which was listed on Euronext Dublin, in August. The company completed its sukuk buyback program in 2019. The sukuk has a three-year life and will mature in October 2020.

In 2020, the company redeemed the remaining US$309 million on the 2017 sukuk after receiving a US$90 million credit facility from Mashreq Bank and selling some Egyptian interests. This concluded Dana Gas’s outstanding sukuk obligations.
